= Stoke-on-Trent =

City in Staffordshire, England

Stoke-on-Trent Stoke
- City and unitary authority
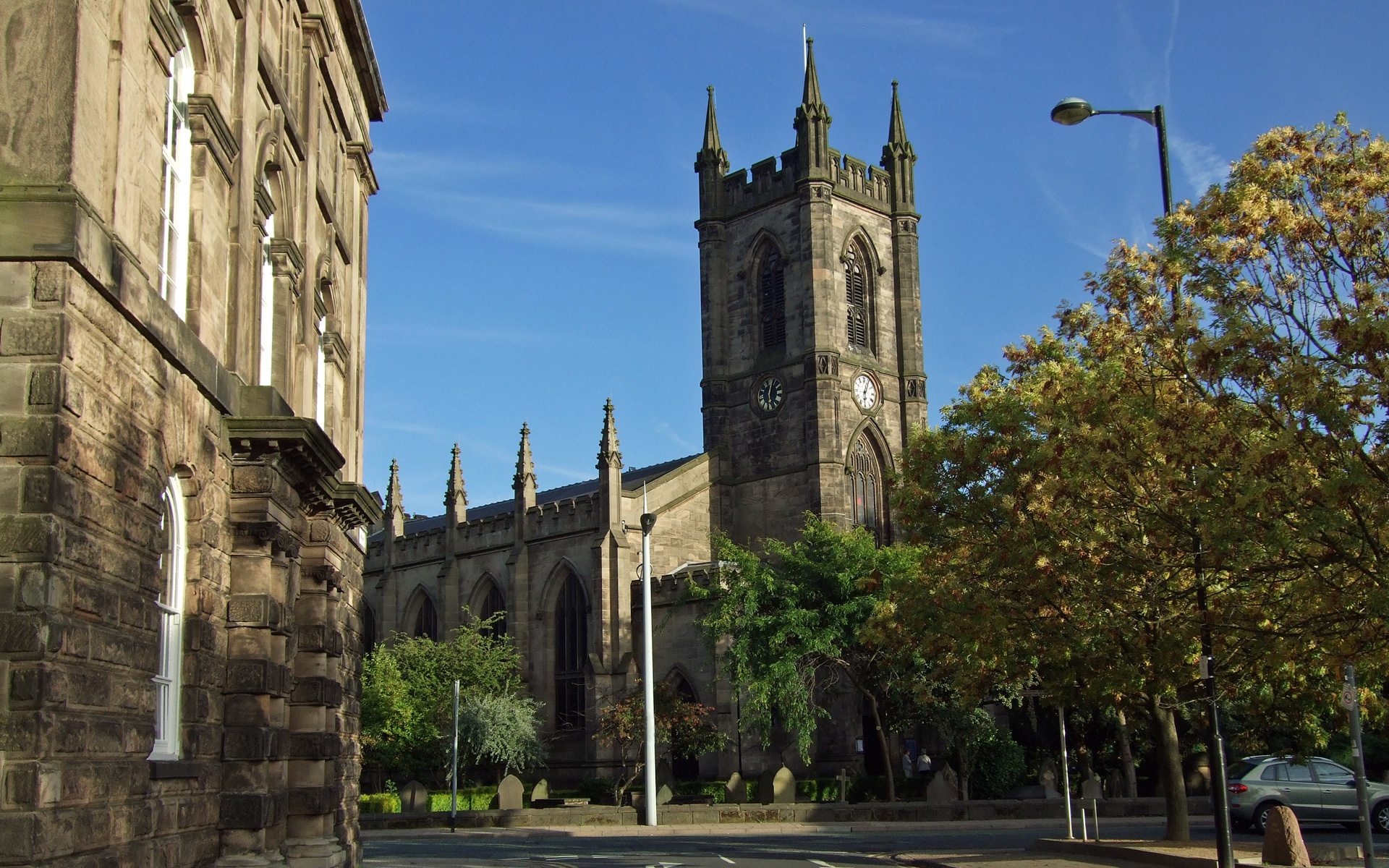
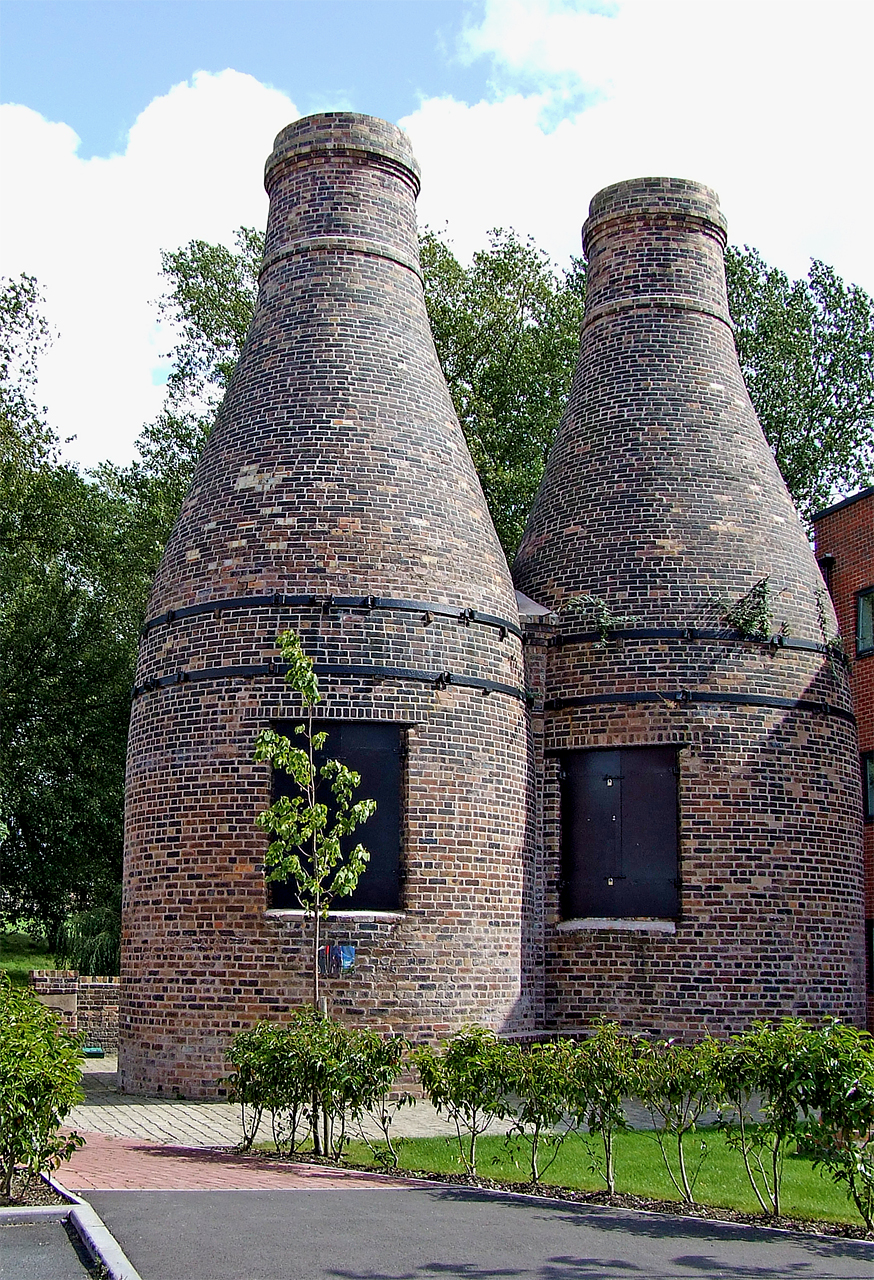
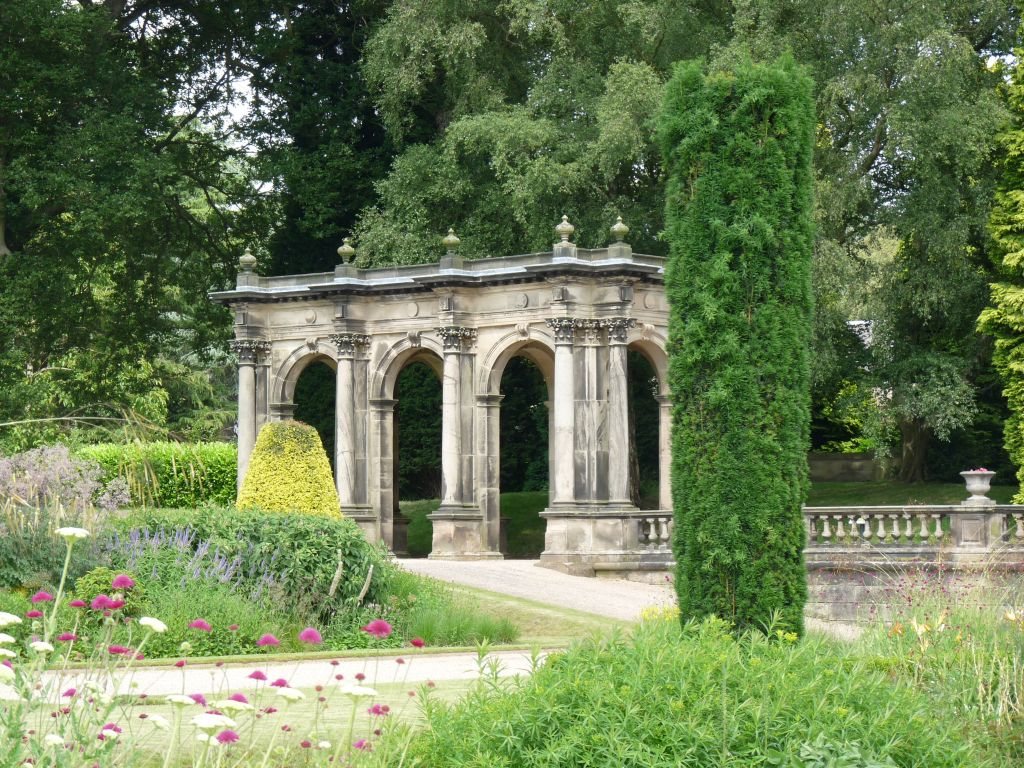
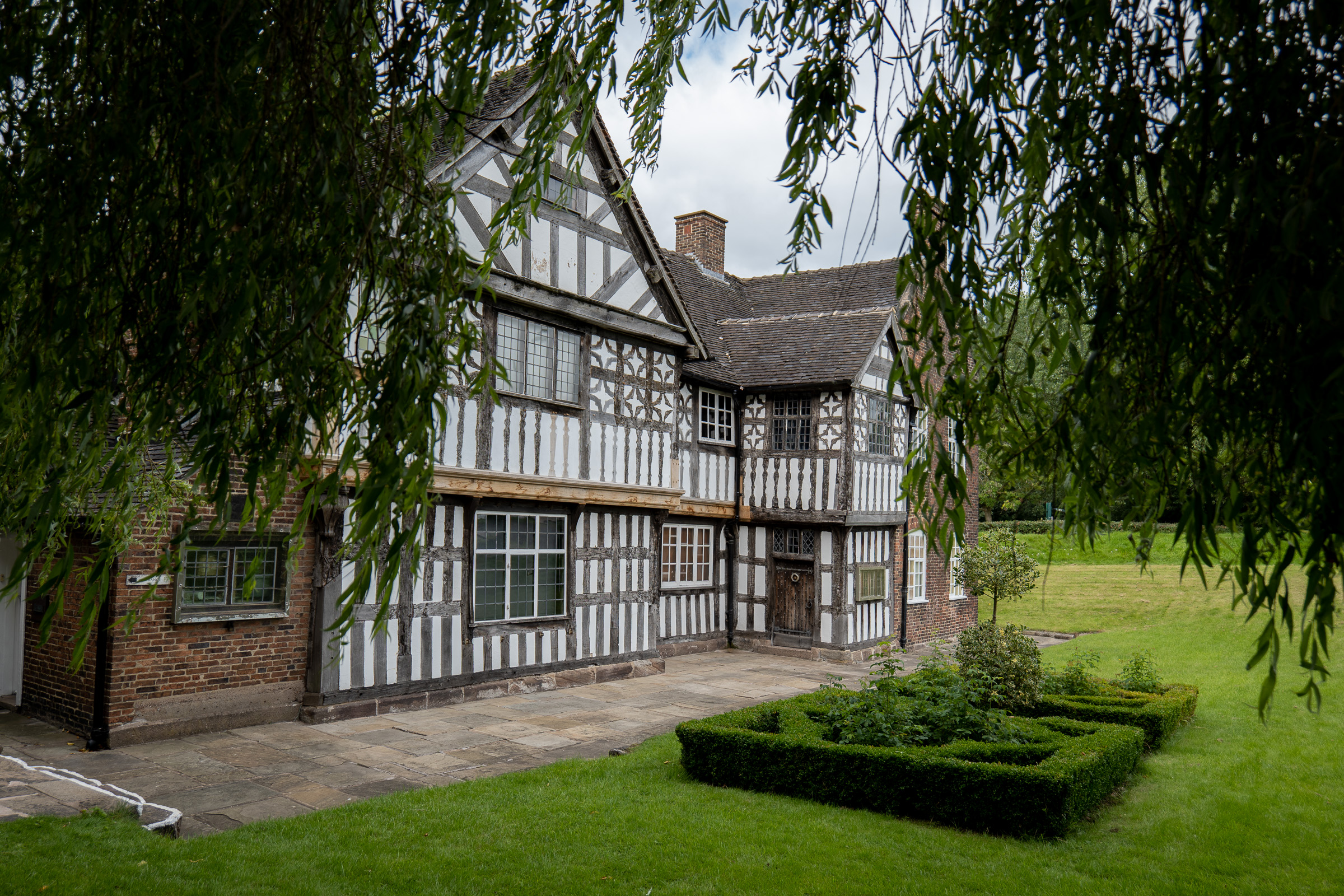
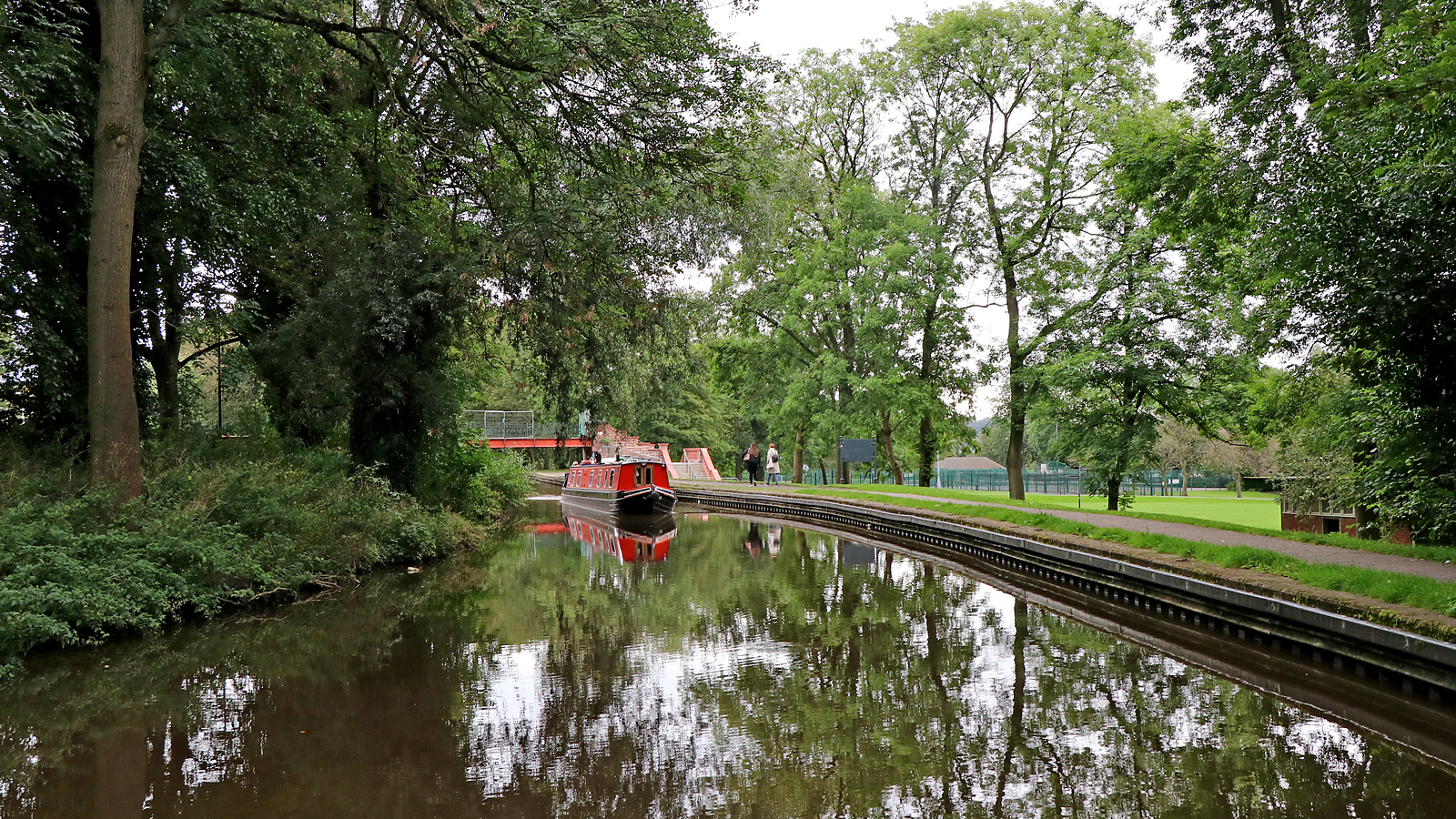
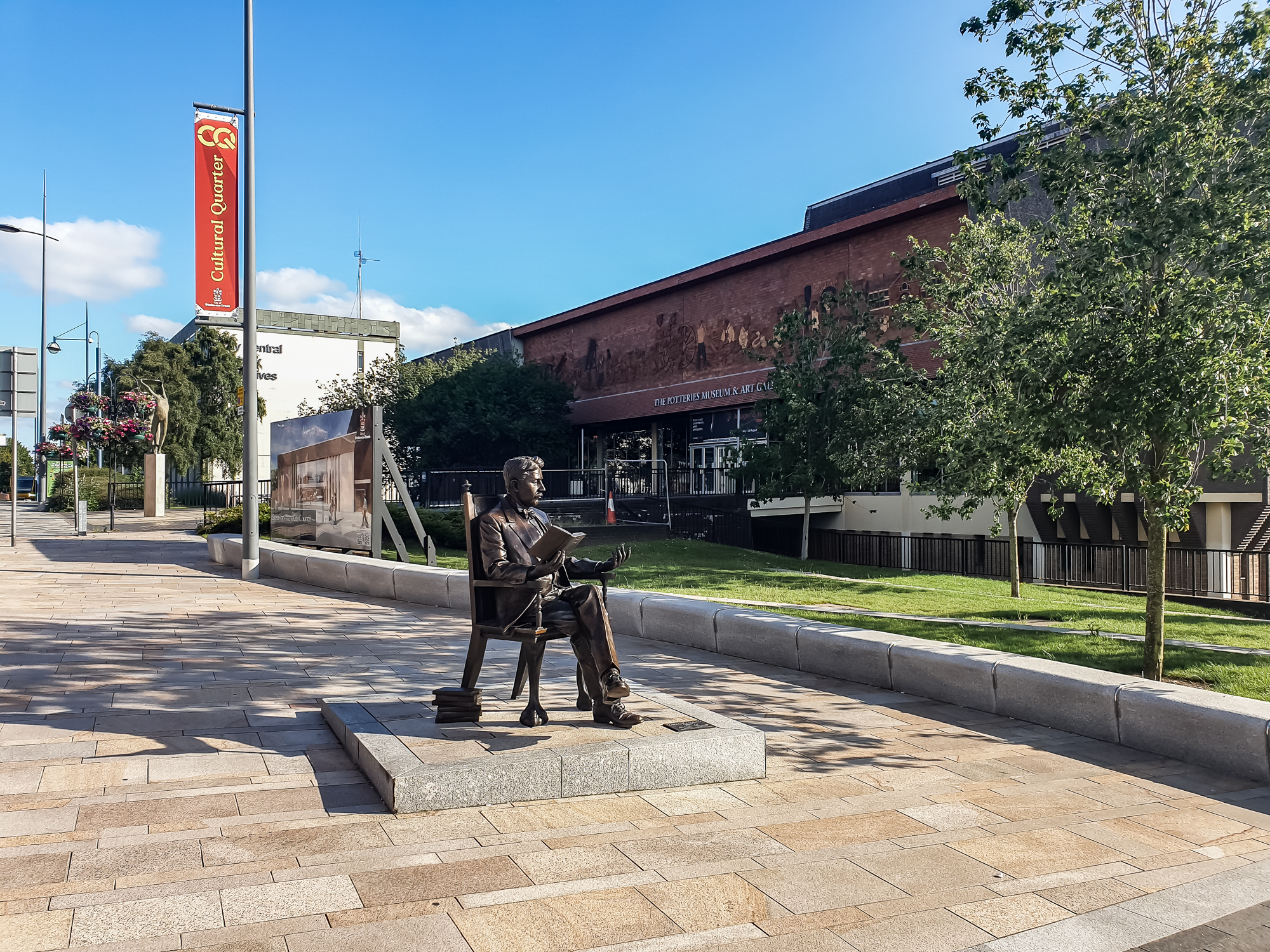
- Stoke Minster Bottle Kilns Trentham Estate Ford Green Hall Hanley Park Potteries Museum & Art Gallery
- Nicknames: The Potteries, City of the Six Towns, Stoke and Stokie
- Motto: Vis Unita Fortior (united strength is stronger)
- Shown within Staffordshire
- Coordinates: 53.0255°N 2.1761°W
- OS grid reference: SJ 87951 45147
- Sovereign state: United Kingdom
- Country: England
- Region: West Midlands
- Ceremonial county: Staffordshire
- County Borough established (Burslem, Fenton, Hanley, Longton, Stoke-upon-Trent and Tunstall): 31 March 1910
- City status: 5 June 1925
- Unitary authority: 1 April 1998
- Administrative HQ: Hanley & Stoke-upon-Trent
- Areas of the city (2011 census BUASD): List: Abbey Hulton; Baddeley Green; Bentilee; Berryhill Fields; Birches Head; Blurton; Bucknall; Burslem (One of the Six Towns); Chell; Cliffe Vale; Cobridge; Dresden; Etruria; Fenton (One of the Six Towns); Florence; Goldenhill; Hanford; Hanley (One of the Six Towns); Hartshill; Hem Heath; Heron Cross; Lightwood; Longport; Longton (One of the Six Towns); Meir; Meir Heath (Village); Middleport; Milton; Normacot; Northwood; Norton le Moors (Part); Penkhull; Shelton; Sideway; Smallthorne; Sneyd Green; Stoke-upon-Trent (One of the Six Towns); Trentham; Tunstall (One of the Six Towns); Weston Coyney

Government
  - Type: Unitary authority with leader and cabinet
  - Body: Stoke-on-Trent City Council
  - Control: Labour
  - Leader: Jane Ashworth (L)
  - Lord Mayor: Lyn Sharpe
  - City Director: Jon Rouse
  - House of Commons: 3 MPs: Gareth Snell (L); David Williams (L); Allison Gardner (L)

Area
  - Total: 93.4 km^{2} (36.1 sq mi)
  - Rank: 221st

Population (2025)
  - Total: 259,965
  - Rank: 69th
  - Density: 2,914/km^{2} (7,550/sq mi)
- Demonym: Stokie

Ethnicity (2021)
  - Ethnic groups: List: 83.5% White; 9.9% Asian; 2.3% Mixed; 2.7% Black; 1.7% other

Religion (2021)
  - Religion: List: 45.8% Christianity; 37.7% no religion; 9.2% Islam; 0.5% Hinduism; 0.4% other; 0.3% Buddhism; 0.2% Sikhism; 0.1% Judaism; 6.4% not stated
- Time zone: UTC+0 (GMT)
  - Summer (DST): UTC+1 (BST)
- Postcode area: ST1-4, 6-9, 12
- Dialling code: 01782
- ISO 3166 code: GB-STE
- GSS code: E06000021
- ITL code: UKG23
  - Total: £7.5 billion
  - Per capita: £28,627
- Website: stoke.gov.uk

Stoke-on-Trent, often known as Stoke, is a city and unitary authority area in Staffordshire, England. It had an estimated population of 259,965 in 2022, making it the largest settlement in Staffordshire and one of the largest cities of the Midlands. Stoke is surrounded by the towns of Alsager, Biddulph, Cheadle, Kidsgrove, Newcastle-under-Lyme and Stone, which form a conurbation around the city.

The city is polycentric, formed from the federation of six towns in 1910. It took its name from the town of Stoke-upon-Trent, where the main centre of government and the principal railway station in the district were. Hanley is the primary commercial centre. The other four towns which form the city are Burslem, Tunstall, Longton, and Fenton.

As the home of the pottery industry in England, the area is known as The Potteries. It is a centre for service industries and distribution centres. It formerly had a primarily heavy industry sector.

== Toponymy ==
The name Stoke is taken from the town of Stoke-upon-Trent, the original ancient parish, with other settlements being chapelries. Stoke derives from the Old English stoc, a word that at first meant little more than place, but which subsequently gained more specific – but divergent – connotations. These variant meanings included dairy farm, secondary or dependent place or farm, summer pasture, crossing place, meeting place and place of worship. It is unknown which of these was intended here and all are plausible.

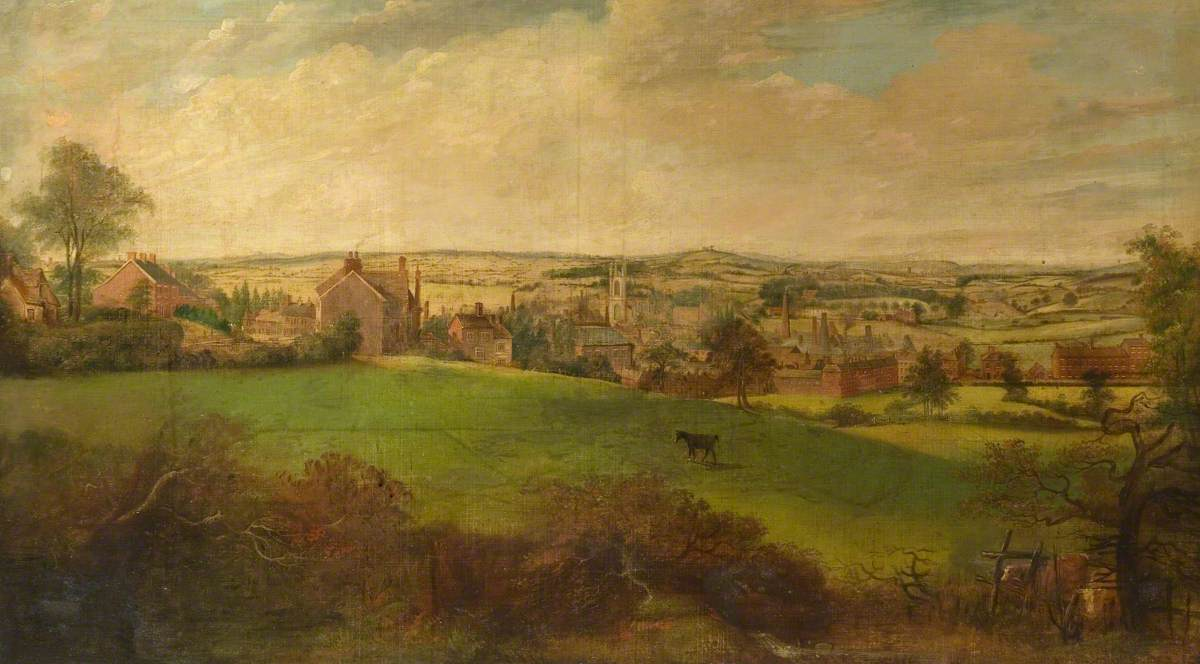
A view of Stoke from Penkhull by Henry Lark I Pratt (1805-1873)

The most frequently suggested interpretations derive from a crossing point on the Roman road that ran from present-day Derby to Chesterton or the early presence of a church, said to have been founded in 670 AD. Because Stoke was such a common name for a settlement, some kind of distinguishing affix was usually added later, in this case, the name of the river.

The motto of Stoke-on-Trent is Vis Unita Fortior, which can be translated as: United Strength is Stronger, or Strength United is the More Powerful, or A United Force is Stronger.

== History ==
=== Administration ===
An early proposal for a federation took place in 1888 when an amendment was raised to the Local Government Bill which would have made the six towns into districts within a county of Staffordshire Potteries. On 1 April 1910 the "Six Towns" were brought together. The county borough of Hanley, the municipal boroughs of Burslem, Longton, and Stoke, together with the urban districts of Tunstall and Fenton now formed a single county borough of Stoke-on-Trent.

In 1919, the borough proposed to expand further and annex the neighbouring borough of Newcastle-under-Lyme and the Wolstanton United Urban District, both to the west of Stoke. This never took place, due to strong objections from Newcastle Corporation. A further attempt was made in 1930, with the promotion of the Stoke-on-Trent Extension Bill. Ultimately, Wolstanton was instead added to Newcastle-under-Lyme in 1932. Although attempts to merge Newcastle, Wolstanton and Kidsgrove (north of Tunstall) were never successful, the borough expanded in 1922, taking in Smallthorne Urban District and parts of other parishes from Stoke upon Trent Rural District.

The borough was granted city status in 1925, with a lord mayor from 1928. When the county borough of Stoke-on-Trent initially applied for city status in 1925, citing its importance as the centre of the pottery industry, it was refused by the Home Office as it had fewer than 300,000 inhabitants. The decision was overturned, when a direct approach was made to King George V, who agreed that the borough ought to be a city. The public announcement of the elevation to city status was made by the king during a visit to Stoke in June 1925.

The county borough was abolished in 1974. Stoke became a non-metropolitan district of Staffordshire; its status as a unitary authority was restored in April 1997. It remains part of the ceremonial county of Staffordshire. For Eurostat purposes it is a ITL 3 region (code TLG31).

Under current local government reorganisation plans, the current unitary authority of Stoke-on-Trent, along with all district councils in Staffordshire, as well as the county council, will be abolished in 2028, with the area forming part of a new North Staffordshire unitary authority, along with the two-tier districts of Newcastle-under-Lyme and Staffordshire Moorlands. It is planned that charter trustees will be used to continue Stoke-on-Trent's city status, and mayoralty.

=== Industry ===
==== Pottery ====
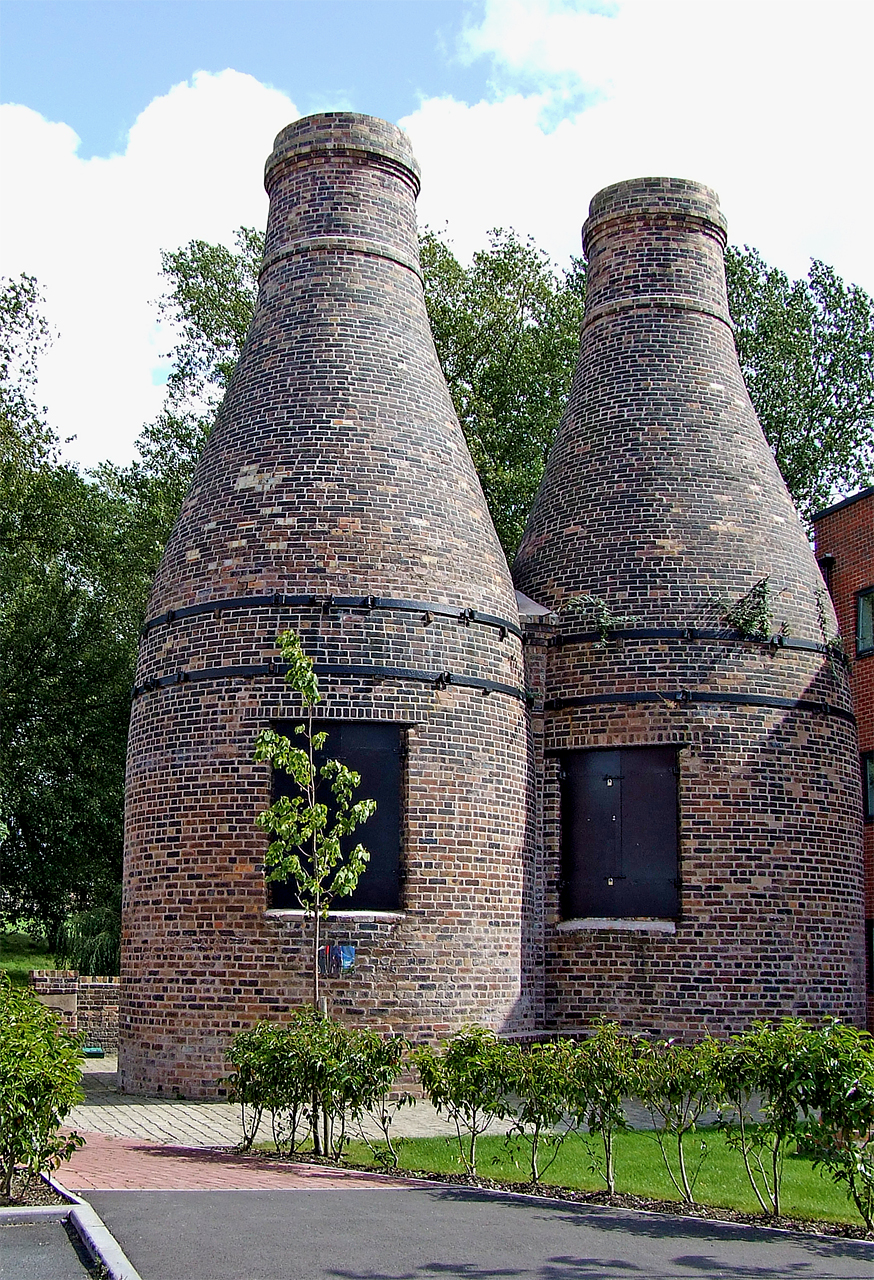
Restored bottle kilns, Stoke-on-Trent

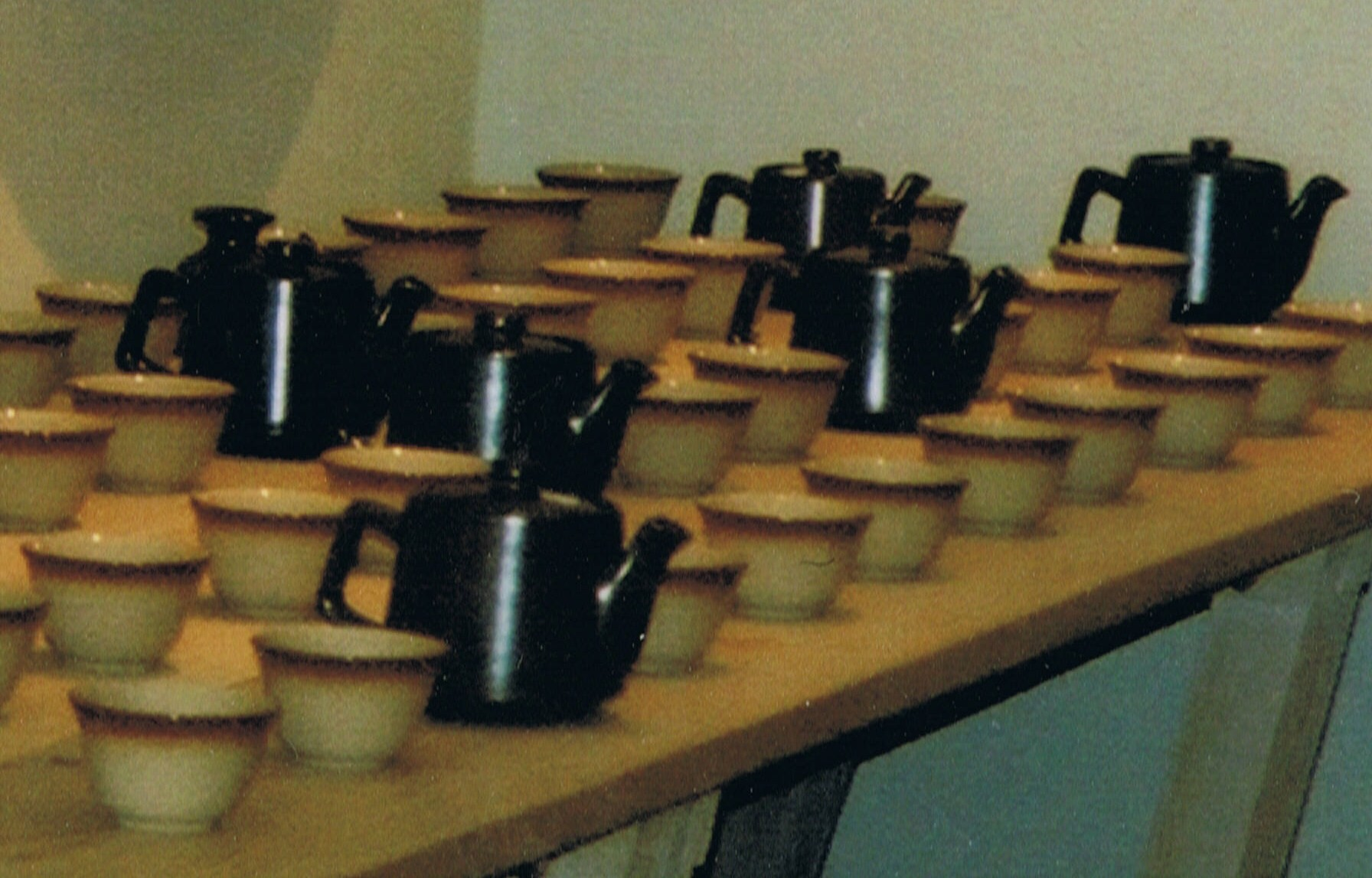
Colorado Bouillons Regina and teapots, vitrified tableware by Dudson Brothers Ltd.

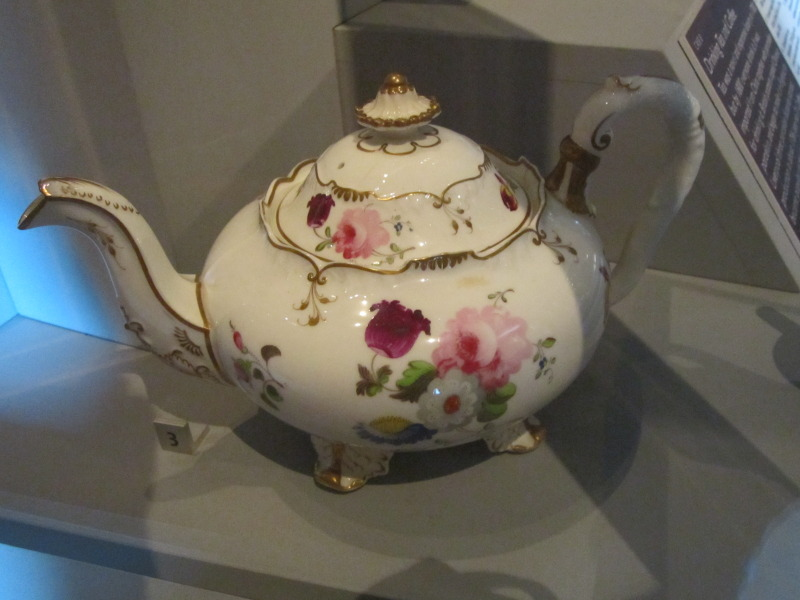
Porcelain teapot by Henry and Richard Daniel, 1830

Since the 17th century, the area has been almost exclusively known for its industrial-scale pottery manufacturing. Companies such as Royal Doulton, Dudson, Spode (founded by Josiah Spode), Wedgwood (founded by Josiah Wedgwood), Minton (founded by Thomas Minton) and Baker & Co. (founded by William Baker) were established and based there. The local abundance of coal and clay suitable for earthenware production led to the early (initially limited) development of the local pottery industry. The construction of the Trent and Mersey Canal (completed in 1777) enabled the import of china clay from Cornwall together with other materials and facilitated the production of creamware and bone china.

Other production centres in Britain, Europe and worldwide had a considerable lead in the production of high-quality wares. Methodical and highly detailed research and experimentation, carried out over many years, nurtured the development of artistic talent throughout the local community and raised the profile of Staffordshire Potteries. This was spearheaded by one man, Josiah Wedgwood, who cut the first sod for the canal in 1766 and erected his Etruria Works that year.

Wedgwood built upon the successes of earlier local potters such as his mentor Thomas Whieldon and along with scientists and engineers, raised the pottery business to a new level. Josiah Spode introduced bone china at Trent in 1796 and Thomas Minton opened his manufactory. With the industry came a large number of notable 20th-century ceramic artists including Clarice Cliff, Susie Cooper, Charlotte Rhead, Frederick Hurten Rhead and Jabez Vodrey.

==== Coal mining ====
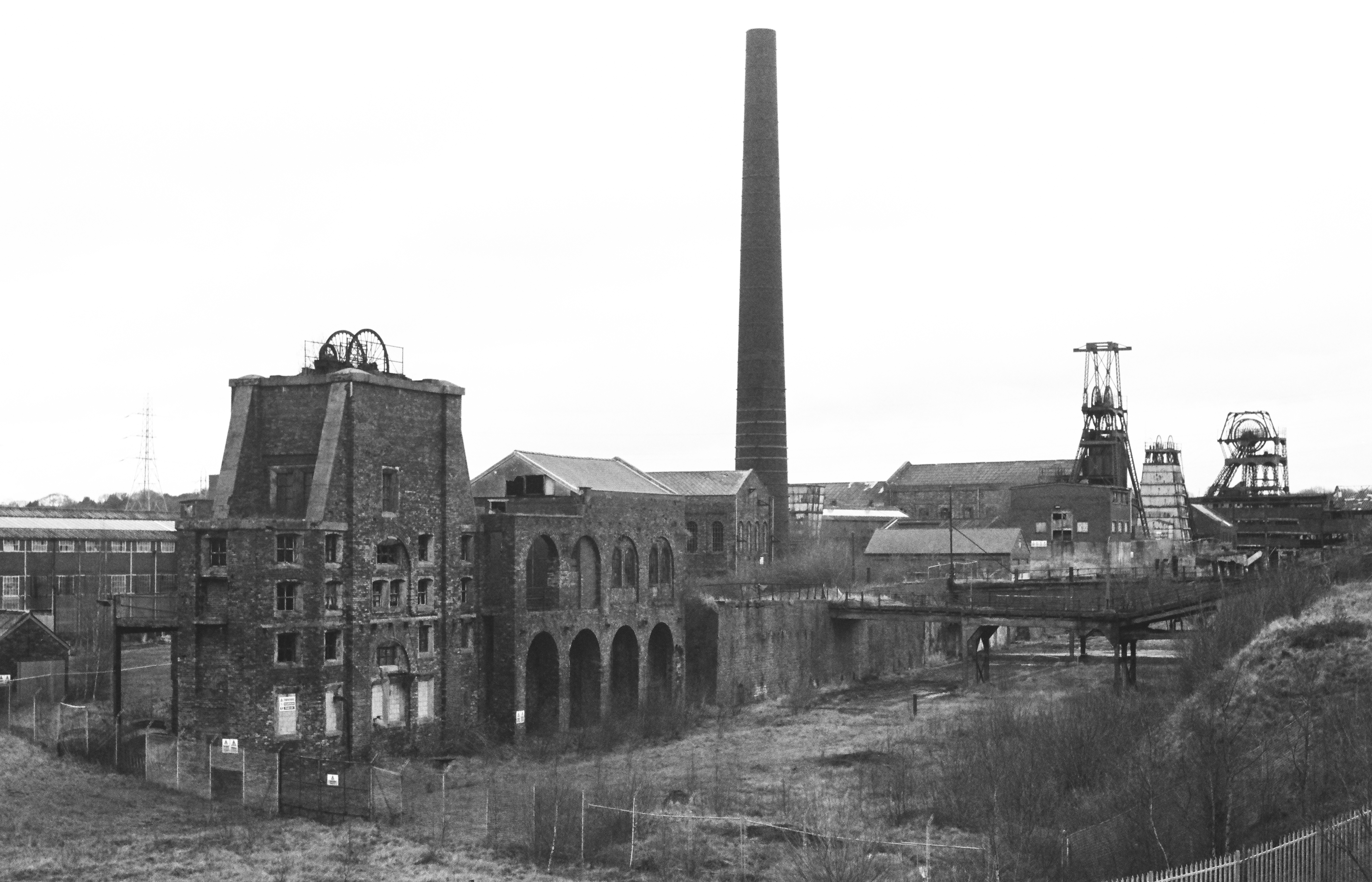
Chatterley Whitfield Colliery

North Staffordshire was a centre for coal mining. The first reports of coal mining in the area come from the 13th century. The Potteries Coalfield (part of the North Staffordshire Coalfield) covers 100 square miles (300 km^{2}).

Striking coal miners in the Hanley and Longton area ignited the nationwide 1842 general strike and its associated Pottery Riots.

When coal mining was nationalised in 1947, about 20,000 men worked in the industry in Stoke-on-Trent. Notable collieries included Hanley Deep Pit, Trentham Superpit (formerly Hem Heath, Stafford and Florence Collieries), Fenton Glebe, Silverdale, Victoria, Mossfield, Parkhall, Norton, Chatterley Whitfield and Wolstanton. The industry developed greatly and new investments in mining projects were planned within the City boundaries as recently as the 1990s. However, 1994 saw the last pit to close as the Trentham Superpit was shut.

The Stoke mining industry set several national and international records. Wolstanton Colliery, when modernised, had the deepest mining shafts in Europe at 3,197 ft. In 1933, Chatterley Whitfield Colliery became the first Colliery in the country to mine one million tons of coal. In the 1980s, Florence Colliery in Longton repeatedly set regional and national production records; in 1992, the combined Trentham Superpit (Hem Heath and Florence) was the first mine in Europe to produce 2.5 million saleable tonnes of coal.

Today the mines are all closed, though the scars of mining remain on the landscape. Slag heaps are still visible on the skyline, now covered with flora and fauna. The Chatterley Whitfield site reopened as a museum two years after its closure in 1976. The museum closed in 1991 and the site became a Local Nature Reserve. It was declared a scheduled monument by English Heritage in 1993. The abandoned subterranean mines are inaccessible, though they still add complications to many building projects and occasionally cause minor tremors, detectable only by specialised equipment.

==== Steel ====
The iron and steel industries occupied important roles in the development of the city, both before and after the federation. Especially notable were those mills located in the valley at Goldendale and Shelton below the hill towns of Tunstall, Burslem and Hanley. Shelton Steelworks' production of steel ended in 1978—instead of producing crude steel, they concentrated on rolling steel billet which was transported from Scunthorpe by rail. The rolling plant finally closed in 2002. From 1864 to 1927, Stoke housed the repair shops of the North Staffordshire Railway and was the home of independent railway locomotive manufacturers Kerr, Stuart and Company from 1881 to 1930.

Shelton Steel Works and the mining operations were heavily involved in the World War II industrial effort. Central to the RAF's success was the Supermarine Spitfire designed by Reginald Mitchell who, whilst born at 115 Congleton Road in the nearby village of Butt Lane, had his apprenticeship at Kerr, Stuart and Company's railway works.

==== Other ====
The Michelin tyre company has a presence in Stoke-on-Trent; in the 1920s, it built its first UK plant in the city. In the 1980s, nearly 9,000 workers were employed at the plant but, by 2006, about 1,200 worked there. RAF Meir was located on the outskirts of the city.

== Geography ==
=== Location ===
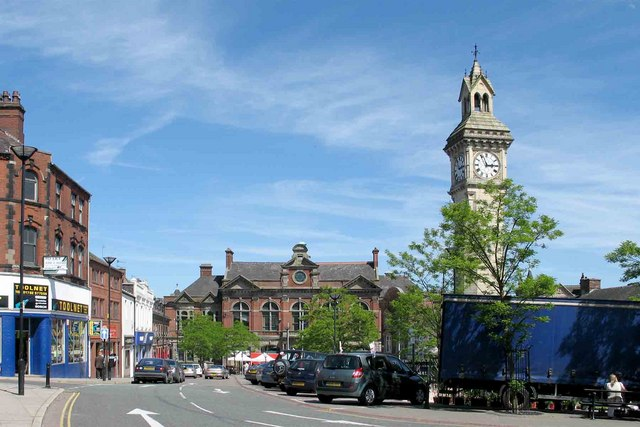
Tunstall Tower Square

Stoke-on-Trent has an area of 36 square miles (93 km^{2}). It is located between Manchester to the north and Wolverhampton and Birmingham to the south on the M6 corridor in the West Midlands region. It lies on the upper valley of the River Trent at the south-west foothills of the Pennines, near the uplands of the Peak District to the north-east and the lowlands of the Midlands and Cheshire Plain to the south and west. The city ranges from 92 to 250 metres (301 to 820 ft) above sea level.

As well as Newcastle-under-Lyme, which adjoins it to the west, other nearby towns include Crewe, Nantwich, Alsager, Congleton, Biddulph, Kidsgrove, Stafford, Uttoxeter, Eccleshall, Cheadle, Stone and Leek.

=== The Five Towns conurbation ===
Stoke-on-Trent is often known as "the city of five towns", the name given to it by local novelist Arnold Bennett, and is the only polycentric city in the UK. In his novels, Bennett used mostly recognisable aliases for five of the six towns, although he called Stoke "Knype". Bennett said that he believed "Five Towns" was more euphonious than "Six Towns", so he omitted Fenton, now sometimes referred to as "the forgotten town." As it is a city made up of multiple towns, the city forms a conurbation. In this case, the conurbation is bigger than Stoke itself, because the urban area of Stoke is contiguous with that of administratively separate Newcastle.

The six towns run in a rough line from north to south along the A50 road – Tunstall, Burslem, Hanley, Stoke, Fenton and Longton. Although the city is named after the original town of Stoke, and the City Council offices are located there, the city centre is usually regarded as being in Hanley, which had earlier developed into a major commercial centre.

For Eurostat purposes, it is a NUTS 3 region (code UKG23); it is also one of four counties or unitary districts that compose the Shropshire and Staffordshire NUTS 2 region.

=== Suburbs ===
As well as the Six Towns, there are numerous suburbs. These include Abbey Hulton, Adderley Green, Baddeley Green, Ball Green, Bentilee, Birches Head, Blurton, Bradeley, Bucknall, Chell, Cliffe Vale, Cobridge, Dresden, Etruria, Fegg Hayes, Florence, Goldenhill, Hartshill, Heron Cross, Meir, Meir Hay, Meir Park, Middleport, Milton, Newstead, Normacot, Northwood, Norton le Moors, Oakhill, Packmoor, Penkhull, Sandyford, Shelton, Smallthorne, Sneyd Green, Stockton Brook, Trentham, Trent Vale and Weston Coyney. Blythe Bridge, Werrington and Endon, although outside the city's boundaries, are part of the built-up area.

=== Climate ===
Stoke-on-Trent, as with all of the United Kingdom, experiences a temperate maritime climate, lacking in weather extremes. The local area is a little more elevated than much of Staffordshire and Cheshire, resulting in cooler temperatures year-round compared to the nearby Cheshire Plain. On calm, clear nights this is often reversed as cold air drainage causes a temperature inversion to occur. As such, the Stoke-on-Trent and Newcastle areas are generally not susceptible to severe frosts. The nearest Met Office weather station is Keele University, about four miles west of the city centre.

The absolute high temperature is 36.1 °C (97.0 °F), recorded in July 2022. More typically the average warmest day of the year should be 27.0 °C (80.6 °F). Just under fourteen days per year have a temperature of 25.1 °C (77.2 °F) or above.

The absolute minimum temperature stands at −13.3 °C (8.1 °F), recorded in January 1963. In an average year, 41 air frosts are registered.

Rainfall averages around 828 mm a year.

Climate data for Keele University, (Note: Weather station is located 4.3 miles (6.9 km) from the Stoke-on-Trent city centre.) elevation: 178 m (584 ft), 1991–2020 normals, extremes 1959–present
Month	Jan	Feb	Mar	Apr	May	Jun	Jul	Aug	Sep	Oct	Nov	Dec	Year
Record high °C (°F)	13.3 (55.9)	17.0 (62.6)	20.6 (69.1)	23.7 (74.7)	30.6 (87.1)	31.4 (88.5)	36.1 (97.0)	35.6 (96.1)	28.0 (82.4)	25.7 (78.3)	17.3 (63.1)	14.4 (57.9)	36.1 (97.0)
Mean daily maximum °C (°F)	6.5 (43.7)	7.1 (44.8)	9.5 (49.1)	12.4 (54.3)	15.5 (59.9)	18.1 (64.6)	20.2 (68.4)	19.8 (67.6)	17.2 (63.0)	13.3 (55.9)	9.4 (48.9)	6.8 (44.2)	13.0 (55.4)
Daily mean °C (°F)	3.9 (39.0)	4.3 (39.7)	6.1 (43.0)	8.4 (47.1)	11.3 (52.3)	14.0 (57.2)	16.0 (60.8)	15.8 (60.4)	13.5 (56.3)	10.2 (50.4)	6.7 (44.1)	4.2 (39.6)	9.5 (49.2)
Mean daily minimum °C (°F)	1.4 (34.5)	1.4 (34.5)	2.7 (36.9)	4.5 (40.1)	7.1 (44.8)	9.9 (49.8)	11.8 (53.2)	11.7 (53.1)	9.8 (49.6)	7.1 (44.8)	3.9 (39.0)	1.7 (35.1)	6.1 (43.0)
Record low °C (°F)	−13.3 (8.1)	−10.0 (14.0)	−9.4 (15.1)	−4.7 (23.5)	−2.8 (27.0)	1.4 (34.5)	5.0 (41.0)	4.6 (40.3)	1.1 (34.0)	−2.5 (27.5)	−8.4 (16.9)	−12.5 (9.5)	−13.3 (8.1)
Average precipitation mm (inches)	67.7 (2.67)	56.8 (2.24)	53.7 (2.11)	53.8 (2.12)	63.2 (2.49)	70.6 (2.78)	69.6 (2.74)	79.0 (3.11)	72.1 (2.84)	82.7 (3.26)	76.7 (3.02)	82.1 (3.23)	828 (32.61)
Average precipitation days (≥ 1.0 mm)	13.6	11.9	11.7	11.1	10.6	11.0	11.9	12.5	11.4	13.3	14.3	14.9	148.2
Mean monthly sunshine hours	53.6	75.1	113.1	155.1	190.5	170.0	182.8	168.1	129.4	100.2	59.2	50.8	1,447.9
Source 1: Met Office
Source 2: Starlings Roost Weather

=== Green belt ===
Stoke is at the centre of the Stoke-on-Trent Green Belt, which is an environment and planning policy that regulates the rural space in Staffordshire surrounding the city and Newcastle-under-Lyme, and extending into Cheshire. It is in place to prevent urban sprawl and minimise further convergence with outlying settlements such as Kidsgrove and Biddulph. First defined in 1967, the vast majority of area covered is outside the city.

There are some landscape features and places of interest that are covered by the designation, mainly along its fringes. These include the Trentham and Goldenhill golf courses, Hem Heath Wood Nature Reserve, Meir Heath, Barlaston Common, Caverswall Cricket Club, Park Hall Nature Reserve, Chatterley Whitfield Country Park and Enterprise Centre, the villages of Baddeley Edge and Ravenscliffe, Bucknall Reservoir, Caldon Canal, the River Blythe, and the Head of Trent, Wedgwood Museum and estate, Strongford Treatment Works and Trent Vale Pumping Station.

== Demography ==
2011 United Kingdom census
Country of birth	Population
United Kingdom	228,294
Poland	1,801
Germany	693
Ireland	571
Italy	324
Nigeria	323
Turkey	257
Ghana	154
Kenya	150
Portugal	125
Lithuania	122
Romania	101
France	91
Spain	71

In the 2011 census, the population of the city was 249,008. This was a modest increase from the 240,636 recorded in the 2001 census. 50.2% of the population is female. 91.68% of the population of Stoke-on-Trent were born in the UK.

86.43% of the population identified themselves as White British, 4.19% identified as British Pakistani and 1.88% identified as Other White. 1.35% identified as Other Asian and 1.36% as Black. Regarding religion, 60.89% described themselves as Christian, 6.02% as Muslim and 25.19% had no religion. 14.28% of the population was retired and 5.61% were students.

=== Ethnicity ===
Ethnic Group	Year									
Ethnic Group	1981 estimations		1991 census		2001 census		2011 census		2021 census	
Ethnic Group	Number	%	Number	%	Number	%	Number	%	Number	%
White: Total	243,216	96.1%	245,046	96.8%	228,107	94.8%	220,712	88.6%	215,699	83.5%
White: British			–	–	225,197	93.6%	215,222	86.4%	202,906	78.5%
White: Irish			–	–	907	0.4%	636	0.3%	572	0.2%
White: Gypsy or Irish Traveller			–	–	–	–	183	0.1%	295	0.1%
White: Roma									428	0.2%
White: Other			–	–	2,003	0.8%	4,671	1.9%	11,498	4.5%
Asian or Asian British: Total	7,281	2.9%	6,128	2.4%	8,888	3.7%	18,442	7.4%	25,597	9.9%
Asian or Asian British: Indian	1,196	0.5%	898	0.4%	1,102	0.5%	2,329	0.9%	2,772	1.1%
Asian or Asian British: Pakistani	5,007	2.0%	4,316	1.7%	6,360	2.6%	10,429	4.2%	15,579	6.0%
Asian or Asian British: Bangladeshi	343	0.1%	309	0.1%	572	0.2%	1,097	0.4%	1,577	0.6%
Asian or Asian British: Chinese	441	0.2%	349	0.1%	400	0.2%	1,224	0.5%	1,073	0.4%
Asian or Asian British: Other Asian	294	0.1%	256	0.1%	454	0.2%	3,363	1.4%	4,596	1.8%
Black or Black British: Total	1,868	0.7%	1,296	0.5%	1,076	0.4%	3,741	1.5%	6,884	2.8%
Black or Black British: African	201	0.1%	145	0.1%	275	0.1%	2,536	1.0%	5,048	2.0%
Black or Black British: Caribbean	1,026	0.4%	671	0.3%	614	0.3%	834	0.3%	916	0.4%
Black or Black British: Other Black	641	0.3%	480	0.2%	187	0.1%	371	0.1%	920	0.4%
Mixed or British Mixed: Total			–	–	2,143	0.9%	4,491	1.8%	5,860	2.3%
Mixed: White and Black Caribbean			–	–	990	0.4%	1,892	0.8%	2,040	0.8%
Mixed: White and Black African			–	–	212	0.1%	559	0.2%	1,020	0.4%
Mixed: White and Asian			–	–	622	0.3%	1,347	0.5%	1,783	0.7%
Mixed: Other Mixed			–	–	319	0.1%	693	0.3%	1,017	0.4%
Other: Total	818	0.3%	630	0.2%	422	0.2%	1,622	0.7%	4,329	1.7%
Other: Arab			–	–	–	–	408	0.2%	690	0.3%
Other: Any other ethnic group					422	0.2%	1,214	0.6%	3,639	1.4%
Non-White: Total	9,967	3.9%	8,054	3.2%	12,529	5.2%	28,296	11.4%	42,670	16.5%
Total	253,183	100%	253,100	100%	240,636	100%	249,008	100%	258,369	100%

=== Religion ===
Religion	2001		2011		2021	
Religion	Number	%	Number	%	Number	%
Holds religious beliefs	189,285	78.6	170,329	68.4	146,223	56.6
Christian	179,845	74.7	151,624	60.9	118,434	45.8
Buddhist	256	0.1	760	0.3	811	0.3
Hindu	428	0.2	1,384	0.6	1,356	0.5
Jewish	83	<0.1	66	<0.1	83	<0.1
Muslim	7,658	3.2	14,993	6.0	23,790	9.2
Sikh	563	0.2	579	0.2	602	0.2
Other religion	452	0.2	923	0.4	1,150	0.4
No religion	32,214	13.4	62,737	25.2	97,433	37.7
Religion not stated	19,137	8.0	15,942	6.4	14,710	5.7
Total population	240,636	100.0	249,008	100.0	258,366	100.0

== Points of interest ==
The city's ceramics collection is housed in the Potteries Museum & Art Gallery in Hanley. Etruria Industrial Museum, on the Caldon Canal, and Gladstone Pottery Museum, in a former potbank in Longton, are dedicated to the city's industrial heritage. Stoke Minster is located in the Stoke-upon-Trent area and is the city's only church with Minster status.

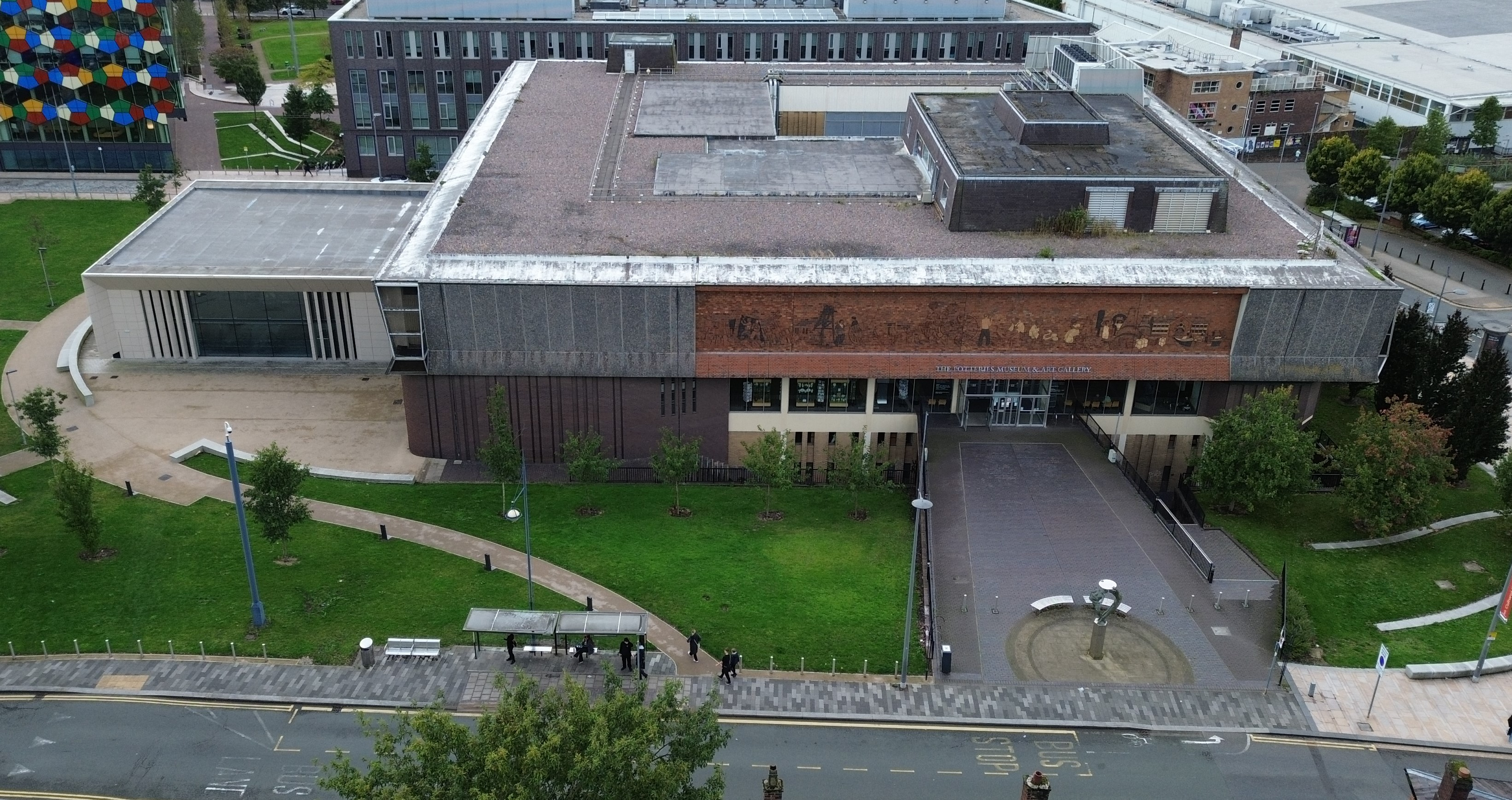
Potteries Museum & Art Gallery

Most of the major pottery companies based in Stoke-on-Trent have factory shops and visitor centres. The £10 million Wedgwood Museum visitor centre opened in the firm's factory in Barlaston in October 2008. The Dudson Centre in Hanley is a museum of the family ceramics business, which is partly housed in a Grade II listed bottle kiln. It is a volunteer centre.

Burleigh in Middleport is the world's oldest working Victorian pottery. There are smaller factory shops, such as Royal Stafford in Burslem, Moorcroft in Cobridge and Emma Bridgewater in Hanley. There are ambitious plans to open the huge Chatterley Whitfield Colliery as a mining museum since it has been given scheduled monument status.

The Elizabethan Ford Green Hall is a 17th-century farmhouse which is now a historic house museum in Smallthorne.

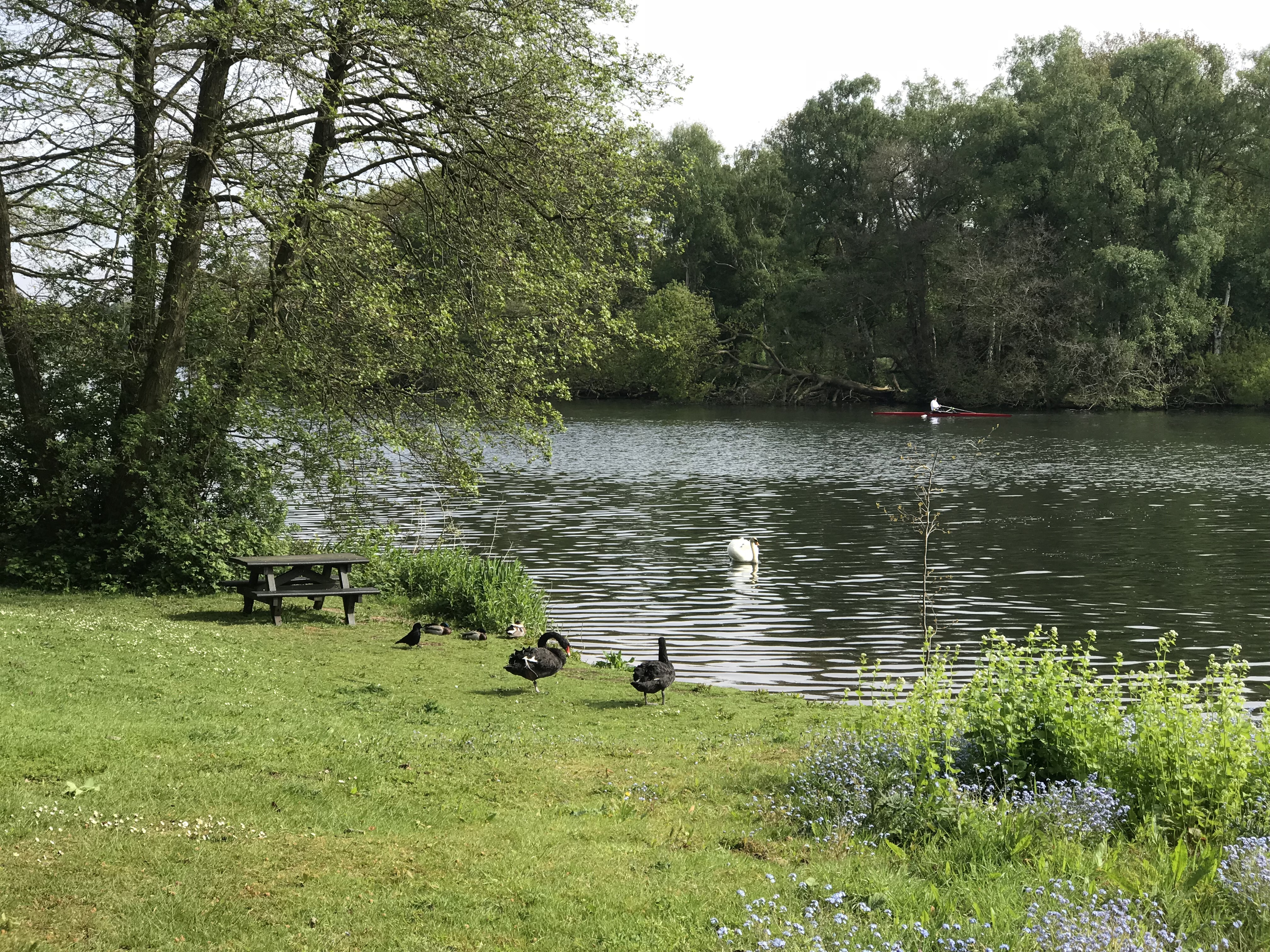
Trentham Lake, Trentham Gardens

Although Trentham Gardens is in the Borough of Stafford, it is just south of the city and often considered part of Stoke-on-Trent. Next door is Trentham Monkey Forest, which houses 140 Barbary macaques in a 60-acre (240,000 m^{2}) enclosure that visitors can walk through.

Alton Towers is sited 10 miles (16 km) east of Stoke-on-Trent and is one of the United Kingdom's best-known attractions. The Waterworld indoor swimming complex on Festival Park near Hanley is also a significant children's attraction.

Each of the six towns in Stoke-on-Trent has at least one park. At nine hectares, Burslem Park is one of the largest registered Victorian parks in the UK. Park Hall Country Park in Weston Coyney is a national nature reserve and its sandstone canyons are a Site of Special Scientific Interest. Hartshill Park in Stoke is a nature reserve. Bucknall Park is home to the City Farm. Westport Lake in Longport is the largest body of water in Stoke-on-Trent and has a nature reserve. Queens Park or Longton Park in Dresden is one of the city's heritage parks and is famous for its horticulture and lakes. It houses several buildings including a clock tower and three bowling pavilions.

== Economy ==
Stoke-on-Trent was a world centre for fine ceramics; a skilled design trade has existed in the area since at least the 12th century. In the late 1980s and 1990s, Stoke-on-Trent was hit hard by the general decline in the British manufacturing sector. Numerous factories, steelworks, collieries and potteries were closed, including the renowned Shelton Bar steelworks. This resulted in a sharp rise in unemployment in the 'high-skilled but low-paid' workforce.

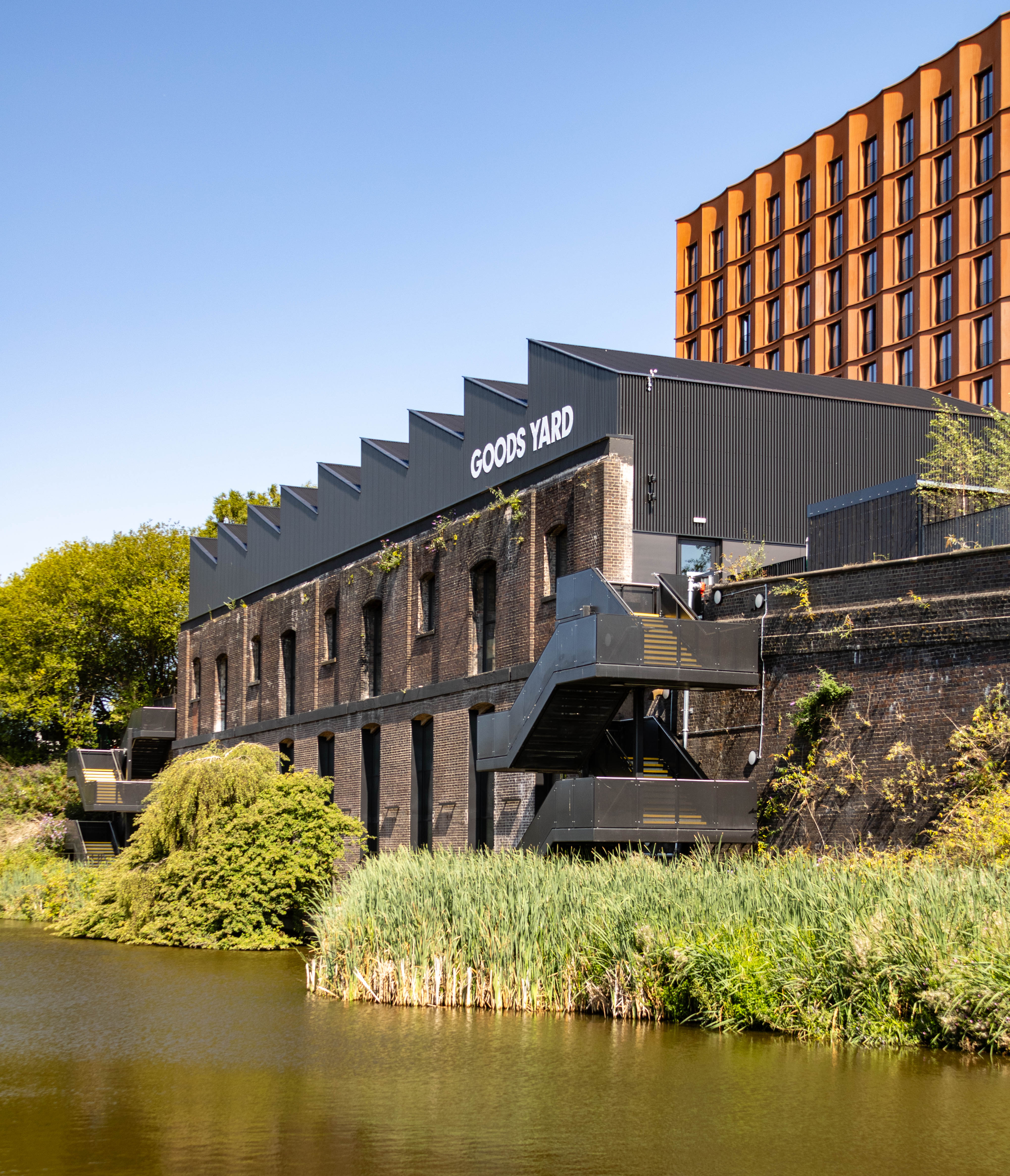
The Goods Yard

The pottery firm Wedgwood and its subsidiary Royal Doulton are based nearby Barlaston, although much production now takes place in the firm's Indonesian factory. Portmeirion is based in Stoke town, and now owns the Spode and Royal Worcester ceramics brands. Ceramics firm Emma Bridgewater is based in Hanley. Burleigh Pottery is in Middleport. Wade Ceramics is in Etruria.

Moorcroft and Royal Stafford are based in Burslem. Aynsley China is in Longton and is one of the last remaining manufacturers of bone china in the city. Fine china manufacturer Dudson have premises in Hanley and Burslem. Churchill China have their main factory in Tunstall. Hotelware manufacturer Steelite is based in Middleport at the former Dunn Bennett site.

About 9,000 firms are based in the city. Amongst the more notable are Bet365, founded by local businessman and Stoke City chairman Peter Coates, and formerly Phones4U, a large retailer of mobile phones started by John Caudwell, until it ceased trading in September 2014.

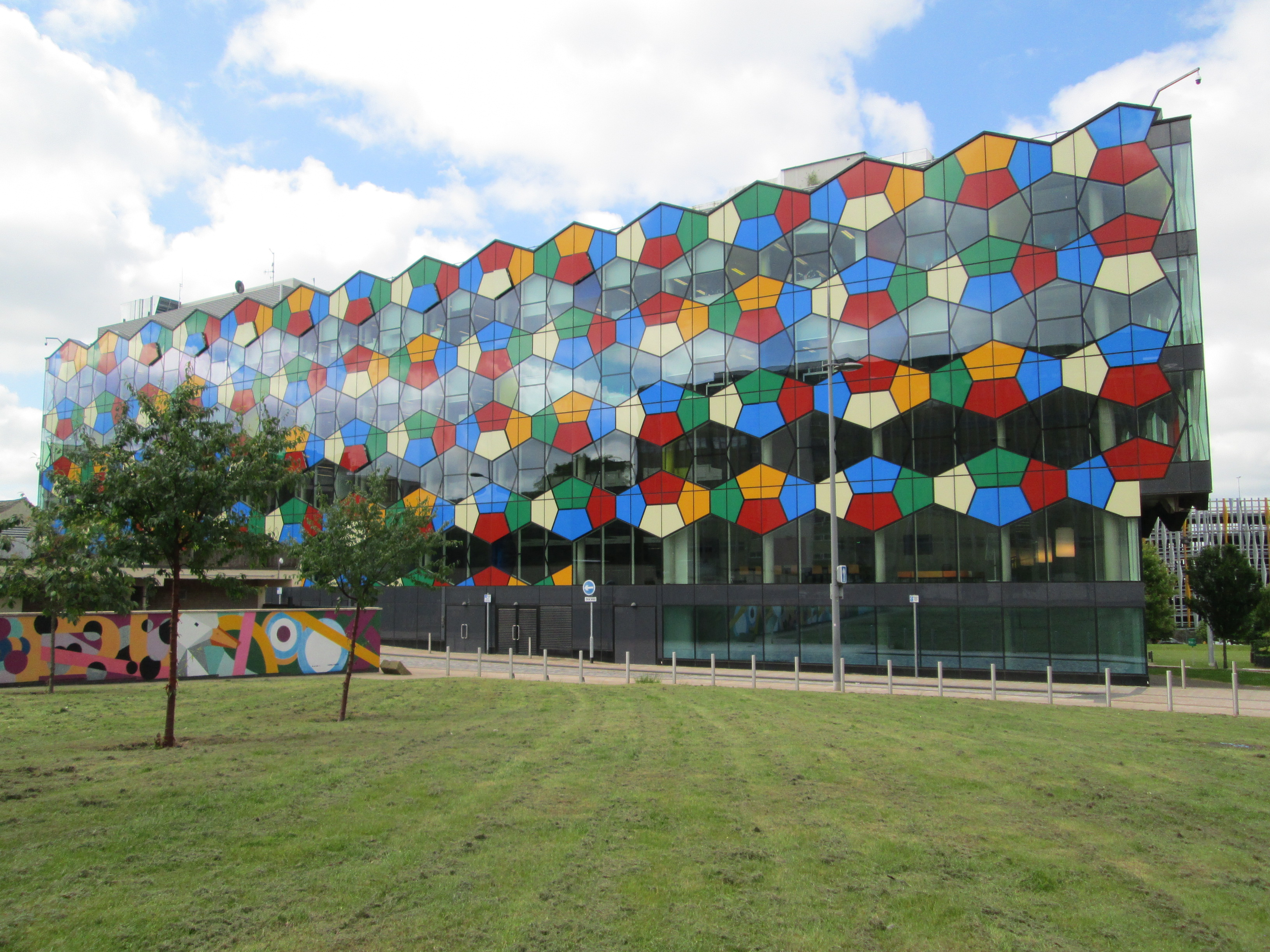
One Smithfield, Hanley, one of the offices of Stoke-on-Trent City Council

Stoke City Football Club has been a major symbol of the city since the early 20th century, having spent most of its history in the highest two divisions of the English league, constantly attracting large crowds and signing or launching the careers of many high-profile players – most notably Stanley Matthews and Gordon Banks. The club was based at the Victoria Ground in Stoke-upon-Trent from 1878 until 1997, when it moved to the Britannia Stadium (now the Bet365 Stadium) at Trentham Lakes. This was one of the early stages of regeneration in the Trentham area of the city, which included the regeneration of Trentham Gardens several years later when retail and food outlets were added to the visitor attraction. Trentham Monkey Forest opened nearby in 2005.

The Michelin tyre company has a complex in the city which houses its commercial head office, training centre and a truck tyre re-treading facility. Sainsbury's supermarket and The Co-operative Pharmacy have large warehouses in the city. Vodafone has a large call centre on Festival Park and the UK subsidiary of the lubricant manufacturer Fuchs Petrolub has its head office at its factory in Hanley. There is a steel foundry owned by Goodwin Steel Castings Ltd in Joiner's Square. Premier Foods make Mr Kipling slices and Cherry Bakewells in Trent Vale. The Co-operative Travel had its head office in Burslem, before it merged with Thomas Cook in 2010. Amazon also maintain a distribution centre on the former site of Hem Heath Colliery.

Stoke-on-Trent City Council is the city's largest single employer. Another major employer is the Royal Stoke University Hospital, with over 7,000 staff.

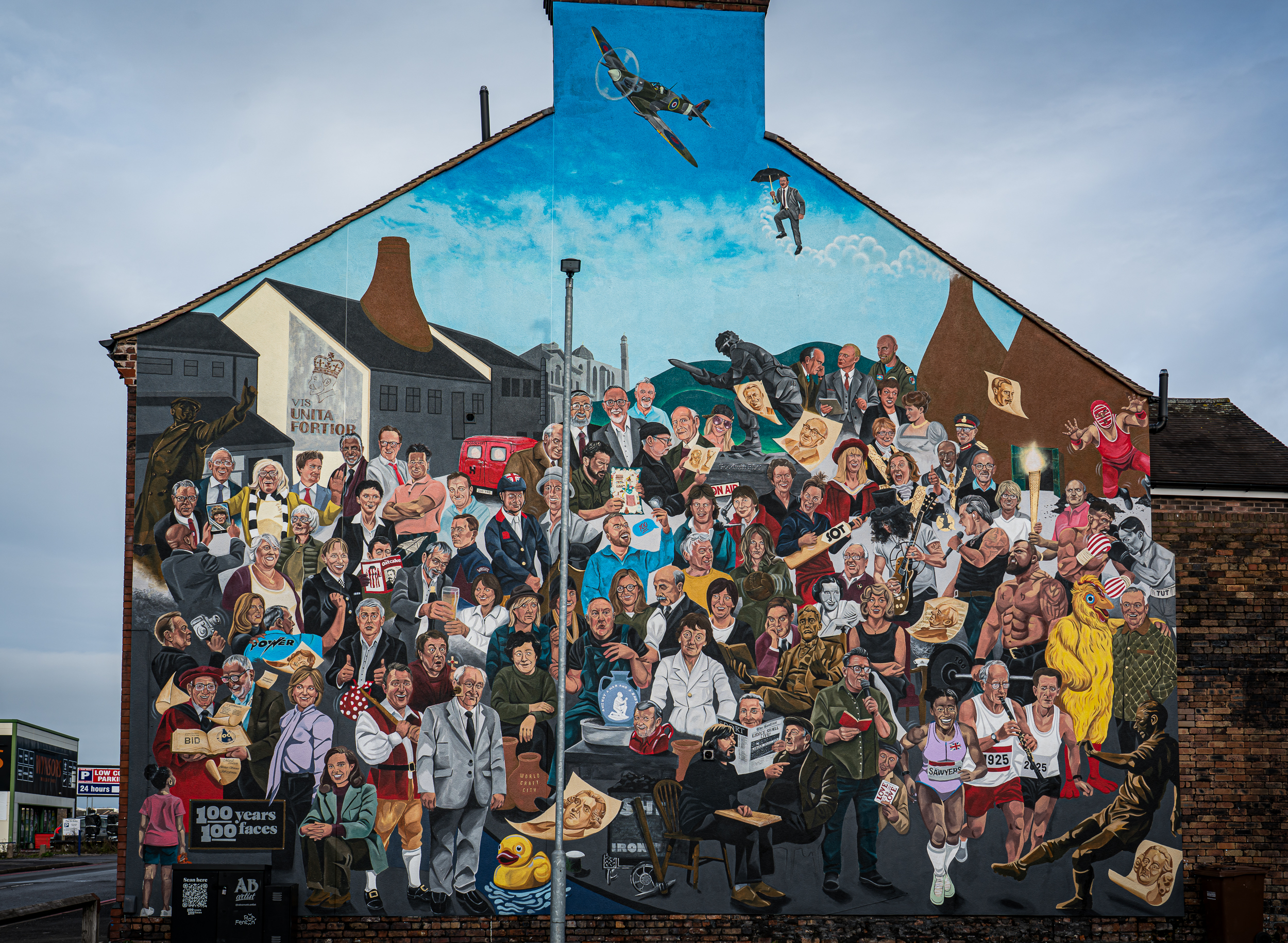
100 Faces Mural, Hanley

Tourism to the city was kick-started by the National Garden Festival in 1986 and is now sustained by the many pottery factory shops and tours and by the improved canal network.

The main shopping centre is the Potteries Shopping Centre in Hanley, which has 561,000 sq ft (52,100 m^{2}) of retail space with 87 units including major stores for New Look, Monsoon, HMV, River Island, H. Samuel and Superdrug. Marks & Spencer used to maintain a store within Hanley - however this has since relocated to Wolstanton retail park. A new shopping centre on the site of Hanley's former bus station was due to open in 2016, but development has been delayed and the project is now in doubt.

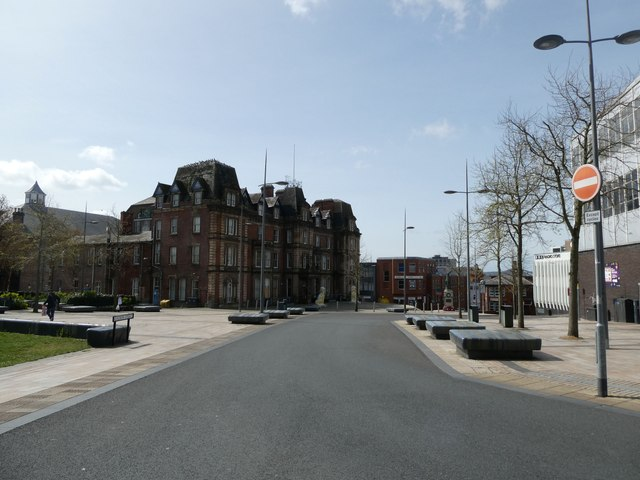
Albion Street, Hanley

The other five towns of the city all have their own smaller town centres. Festival Park is a large retail and business park located in Etruria, built on the former Garden Festival site. There are retail parks in Tunstall, Fenton and Longton. Longton, called Phoenix Park straddles the A50 on the outskirts of Longton and has a Currys, Smyths, Pets at Home, Shoezone, Sports Direct, T.K. Maxx and Matalan. A pub, McDonald's, Greggs and Costa Coffee are also on the site.

Other notable business people from the city include Reginald H. Jones (Chairman of General Electric), venture capitalist Jon Moulton, and John Madejski (chairman of Reading F.C. and former owner of Auto Trader).

=== Accolades ===
KPMG's Competitive Alternatives 2004 report declared Stoke-on-Trent to be the most cost-effective place to set up a new UK business. The city currently has the advantage of offering affordable business property, while being surrounded by a belt of affluent areas such as the Peak District, Stone and south Cheshire, and has excellent road links via the A500 and nearby M6 and rail links.

In 2016, Stoke-on-Trent was ranked the second-best city to start a business by Quality Formations, based on several factors including commercial property, energy, virtual offices, public transport and financial access.

== Governance ==
The city is covered by three House of Commons constituencies: Stoke-on-Trent North, Stoke-on-Trent Central and Stoke-on-Trent South. Until 2019, the northern and central seats had returned Labour MPs since their creation in 1950. However, in the 2019 general election, all three Stoke-on-Trent constituencies returned a Conservative MP. The former Labour heartland is highly eurosceptic leading to a 69.4% vote to leave the European Union in 2016. The city was within the West Midlands European Parliament constituency.

=== Mayoral system ===
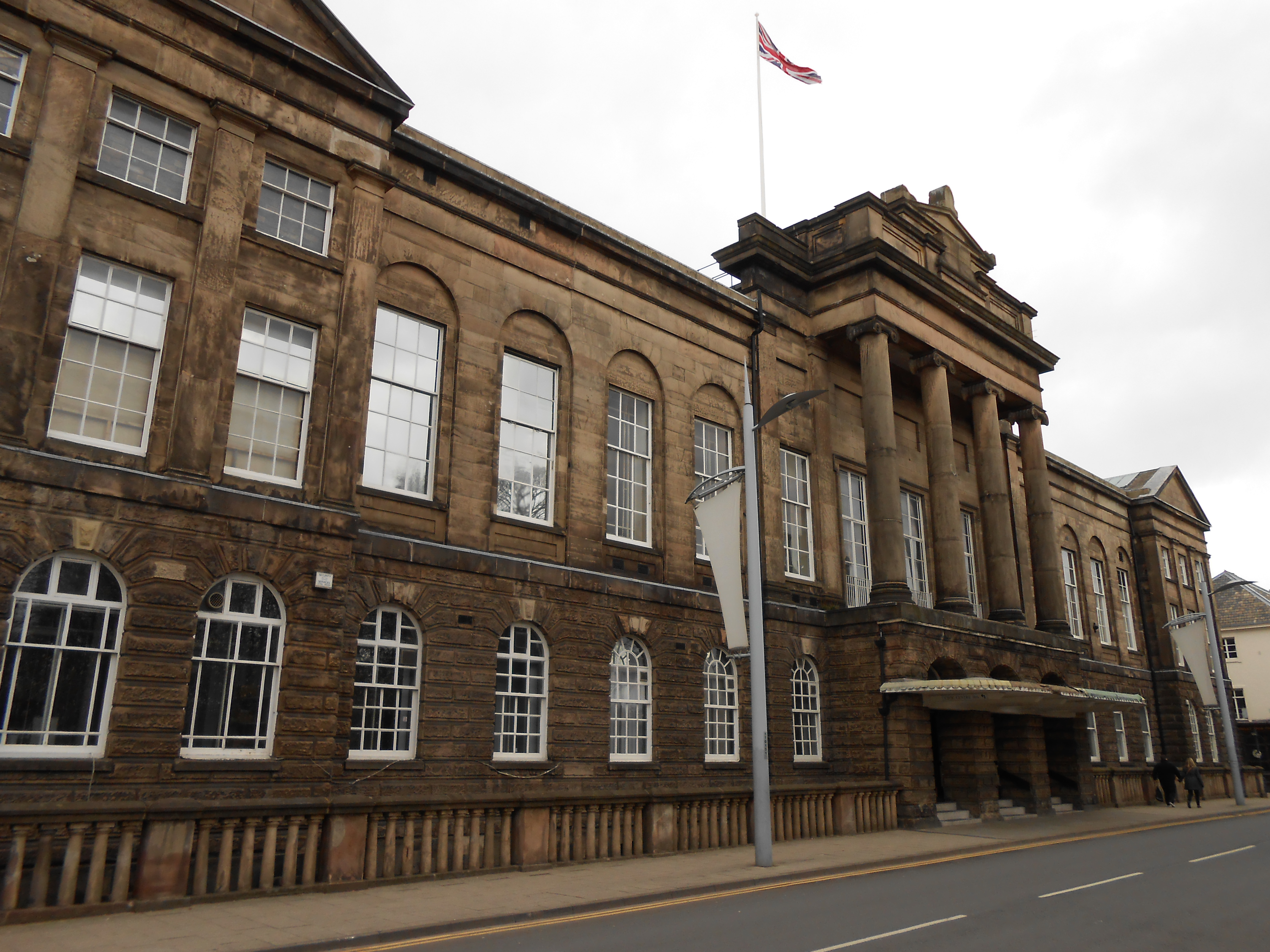
Stoke-upon-Trent Town Hall

The position of Lord Mayor is largely ceremonial. The title of Lord Mayor was first conferred on the City of Stoke-on-Trent by King George V who visited Stoke-upon-Trent Town Hall to award the town city status on 5 June 1925. The role of Lord Mayor is decided upon by a vote amongst the elected councillors; the candidates are also selected from the councillors.

Between 1910 and 1928, the Borough and, later, the City of Stoke-on-Trent had a Mayor rather than a Lord Mayor. The first Mayor of Stoke-on-Trent was Cecil Wedgwood of the Wedgwood pottery dynasty.

The city was one of a limited number of English districts with an elected mayor and the only council to use the 'mayor and council-manager' executive arrangements.

A local referendum approved a directly elected mayor system in May 2002, by 28,601 votes to 20,578 (a turnout of 27.8%). It was removed following a local referendum in October 2008.

Mike Wolfe, an independent candidate, became the first directly elected mayor after an election on 17 October 2002, narrowly beating Labour Party candidate George Stevenson by just 300 votes. The elected Mayor from 5 May 2005 to 5 June 2009 was Mark Meredith (Labour Party). The 2005 election was notable because about 10% of the ballot papers were either spoiled or ineligible. Meredith's election platform included a pledge to have another referendum on the post of an elected mayor. This was scheduled for May 2007 and resulted in the abolition of the mayoral system.

In October 2008, voters returned to the polls to choose between modifying the system, to Mayor and Cabinet, or abolishing the position of elected Mayor. Votes were 21,231 for abolition and 14,592 for modification on a turnout of 19.23%.

=== Council Leader and Cabinet system ===
Following a citywide referendum abolishing the position of elected mayor, a Leader and Cabinet system was adopted in June 2009. The Leader of the council is elected by councillors. Each cabinet member makes the decisions on their portfolio area and explains the decisions at the monthly cabinet meetings. The current leader of the council is Cllr Jane Ashworth.

=== Councillor representation ===
Since the 2023 local elections, the council has been controlled by the Labour Party. Between 2015 and 2023, no party had overall control of the city council.

Party	Councillors
Labour	29
Conservative	14
City Independents	1

=== Members of Parliament ===
Constituency	Member of Parliament	Political party	Year first elected	Notes
Stoke-on-Trent Central	Gareth Snell	Labour Party	2024	Previously held the seat 2017–2019
Stoke-on-Trent North	David Williams	Labour Party	2024	
Stoke-on-Trent South	Allison Gardner	Labour Party	2024	

== Public services ==
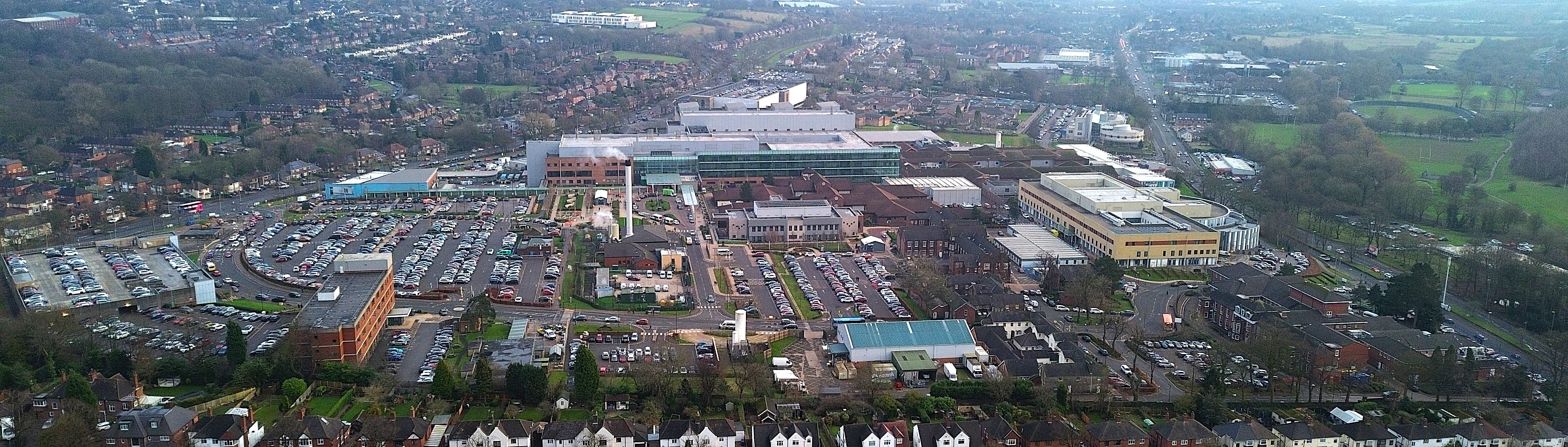
Royal Stoke University Hospital from above

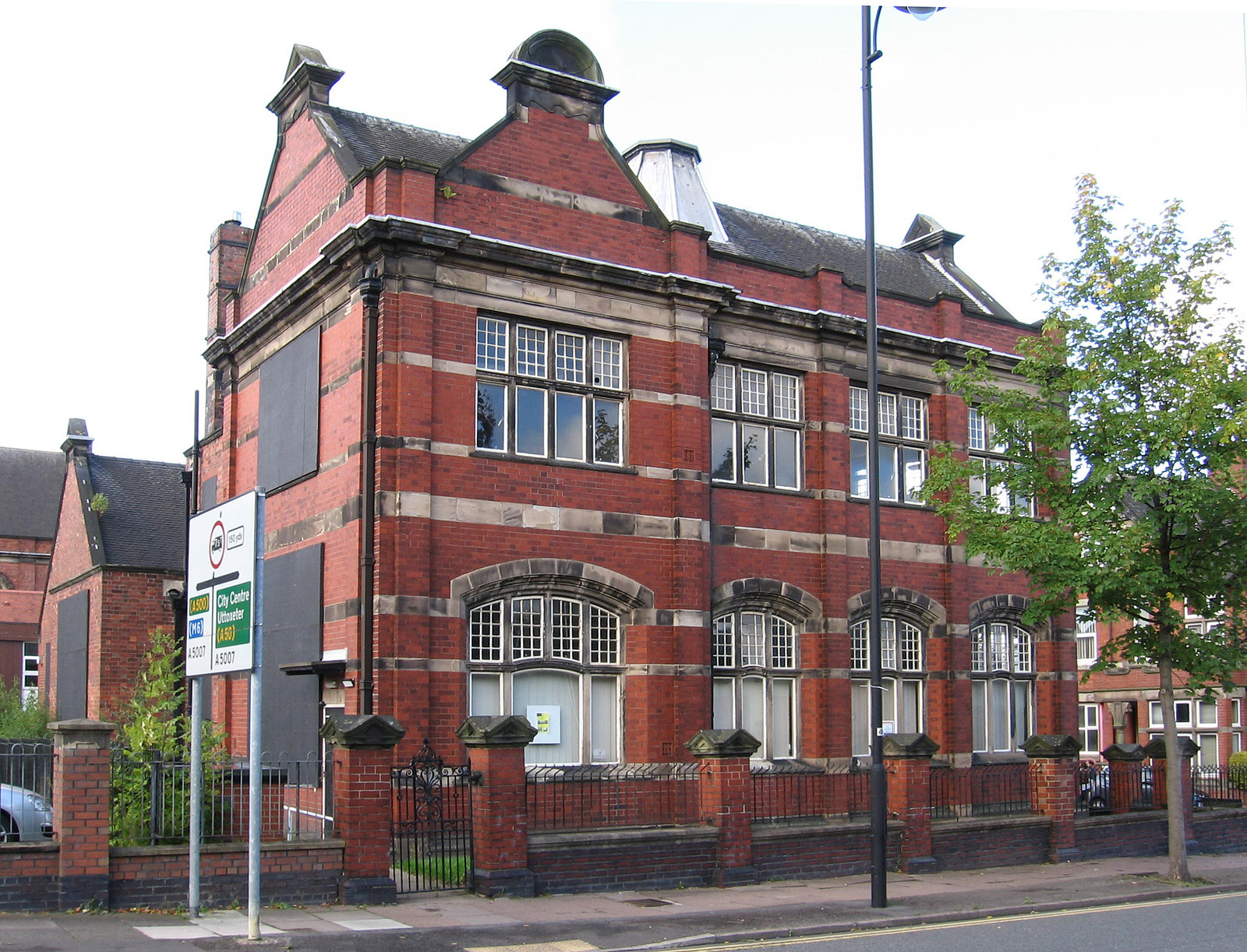
Fenton Library

The city's acute hospital is the Royal Stoke University Hospital run by the University Hospitals of North Midlands NHS Trust it is the third biggest hospital in the UK. It formerly comprised two sites: the Royal Infirmary and the City General. The hospital was rebuilt on the City General site on the A34, London Road.

Community health services are run by Staffordshire and Stoke-on-Trent Partnership NHS Trust with mental health services provided by North Staffordshire Combined Healthcare NHS Trust.

Policing in Stoke-on-Trent is provided by Staffordshire Police, which has stations in Hanley, Bucknall, Burslem, Longton, Stoke and Tunstall. Stoke-on-Trent Crown Court and Stoke-on-Trent County Court share Stoke-on-Trent Combined Court Centre in Hanley. There is no magistrates' court. Hearings were held in Fenton Town Hall until it closed in 2012. All magistrates proceedings now take place in Newcastle. Statutory emergency fire and rescue service is provided by the Staffordshire Fire and Rescue Service, which has fire stations in Hanley, Longton, Burslem and Sandyford.

Severn Trent manages Stoke-on-Trent's drinking and waste water.

Since the 1970s, the city's main library had been the former Hanley Library, later known as the City Central Library & Archives in Bethesda Street, which was home to the city's archives. During this period, the City Council operated eight smaller libraries throughout the city. In July 2022, it was announced that the Hanley Library building, along with others in the city, would be closed to be sold. The city archives would be moved to the Potteries Museum and Art Gallery, an adjacent building with frontages to Bethesda Street and Broad Street.

== Religion ==
Hugh Bourne, founder of Primitive Methodism

Stoke-on-Trent does not have a cathedral. The city's main Church of England civic church is Stoke Minster. The city is within the Anglican Diocese of Lichfield. The city is part of the Roman Catholic Archdiocese of Birmingham and the immediate area has six Catholic parishes. They are dedicated to: the Sacred Heart of Jesus, Our Lady of the Angels, Saint George, Saint Gregory the Great, Saint Maria Goretti and Saint Teresa.

Primitive Methodism was founded by Hugh Bourne, a native of Stoke-on-Trent, at a public gathering in the nearby village of Mow Cop. He originally followed the Wesleyan form of Methodism, but in 1801 he reformed the Methodist service by conducting it outside. He founded the first chapel in Tunstall with his brother in 1811. He promoted Sunday schools as a method of improving children's education, advocated the equal treatment of women and men, and was involved in the temperance movement. It was from the Primitive Methodists that many early trade unions found their early leaders. Also of note is John Lightfoot, a 17th-century churchman and rabbinical scholar.

The city's first purpose-built mosque was completed in 2012. The city's only synagogue closed in 2006 and was replaced with a smaller one in nearby Newcastle-under-Lyme.

== Transport ==
=== Roads ===
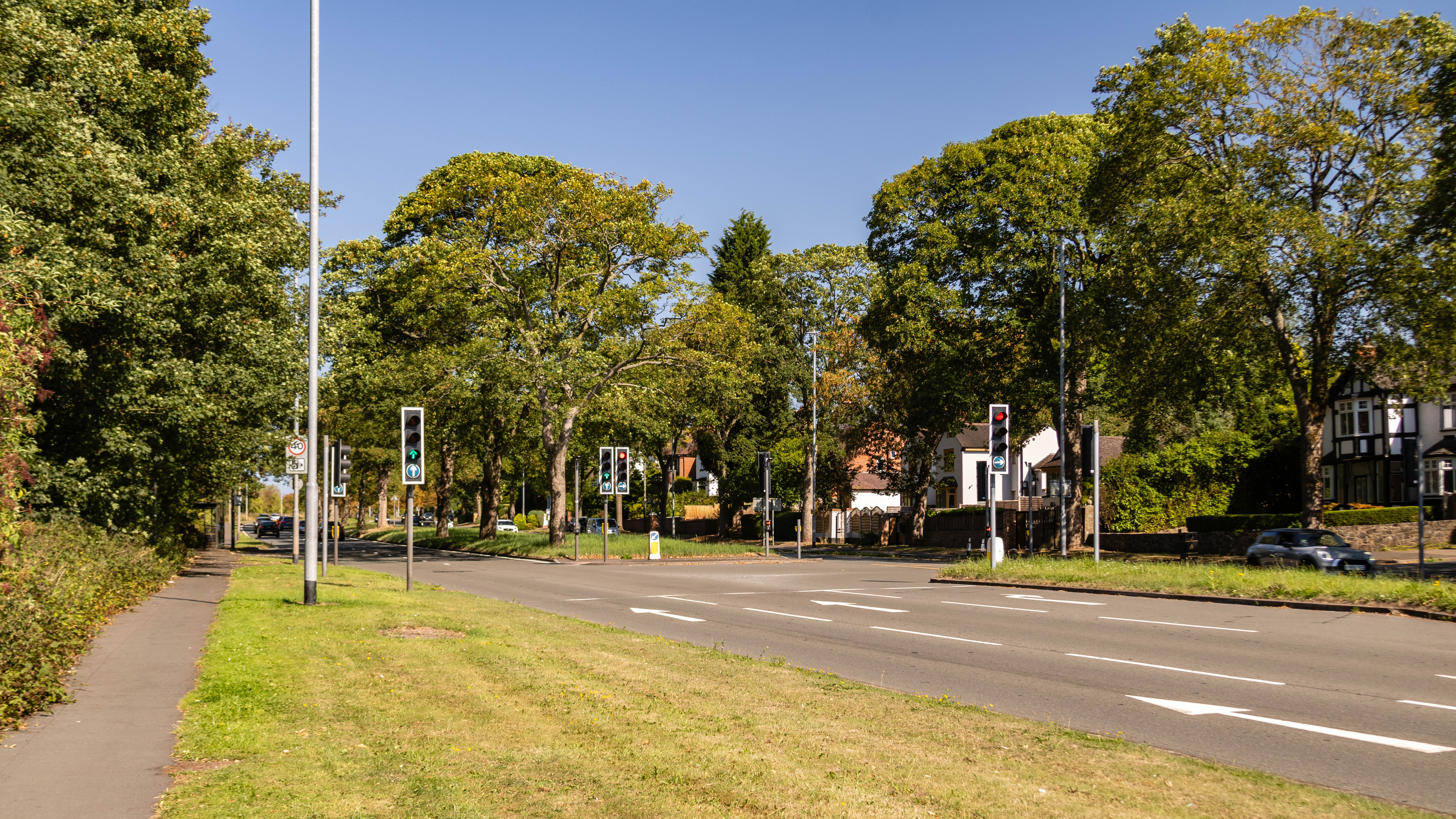
A34 at Hanford

Stoke-on-Trent is linked to the nearby M6 motorway at junctions 15 and 16 by the A500. Locally the A500 is known as the D road, as its loop between the two motorway junctions, along with the straight section of the M6 between the junctions, resembles the shape of a capital letter D; coincidentally, the number 500 expressed in Roman numerals is also D.

The A50 provides an east–west link between the M6 and the M1 motorway; it joins up with the A500 close to the bet365 Stadium. Improvements to the road network have led to the construction of product distribution centres in the area.

=== Railway ===
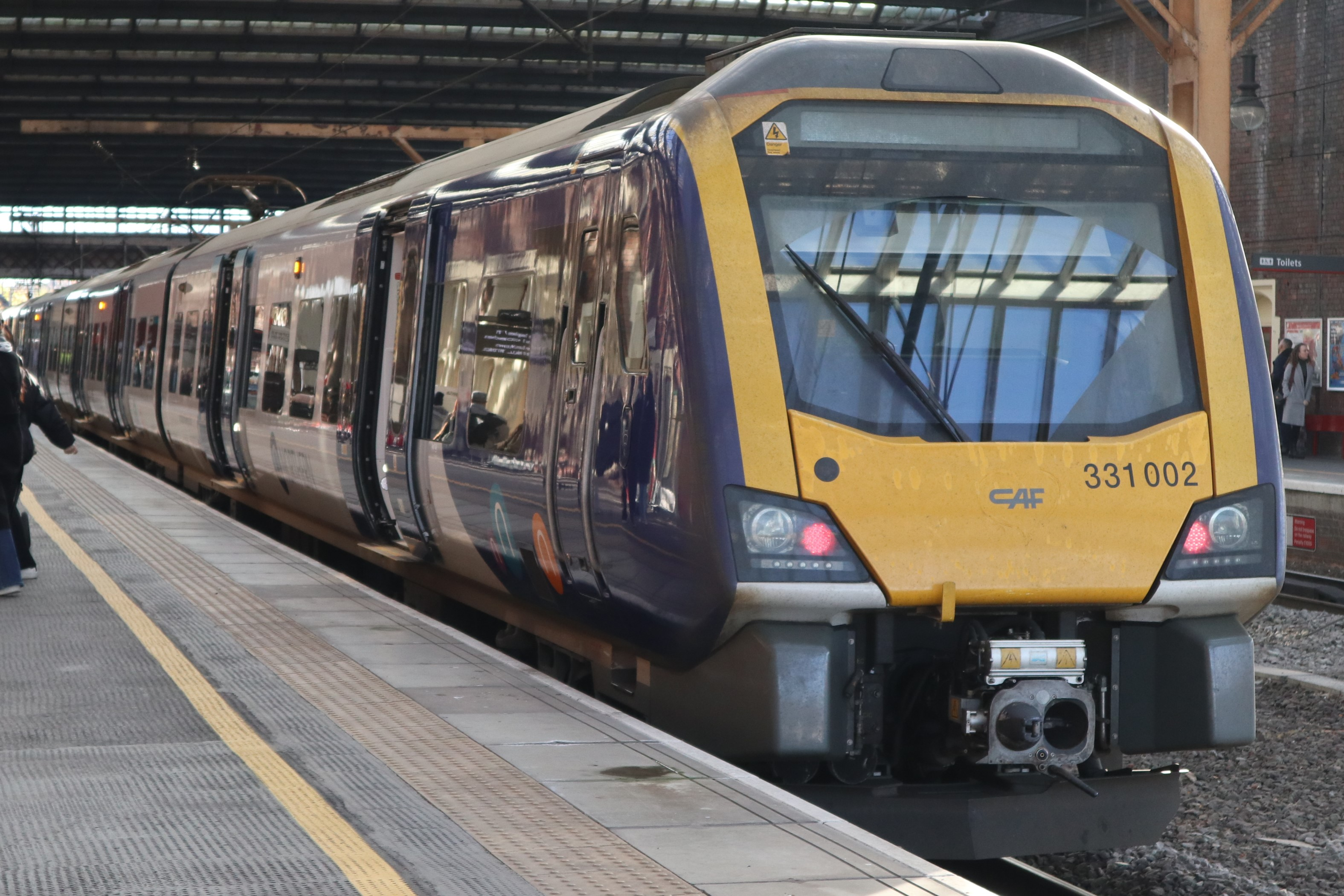
Stoke-on-Trent railway station platform

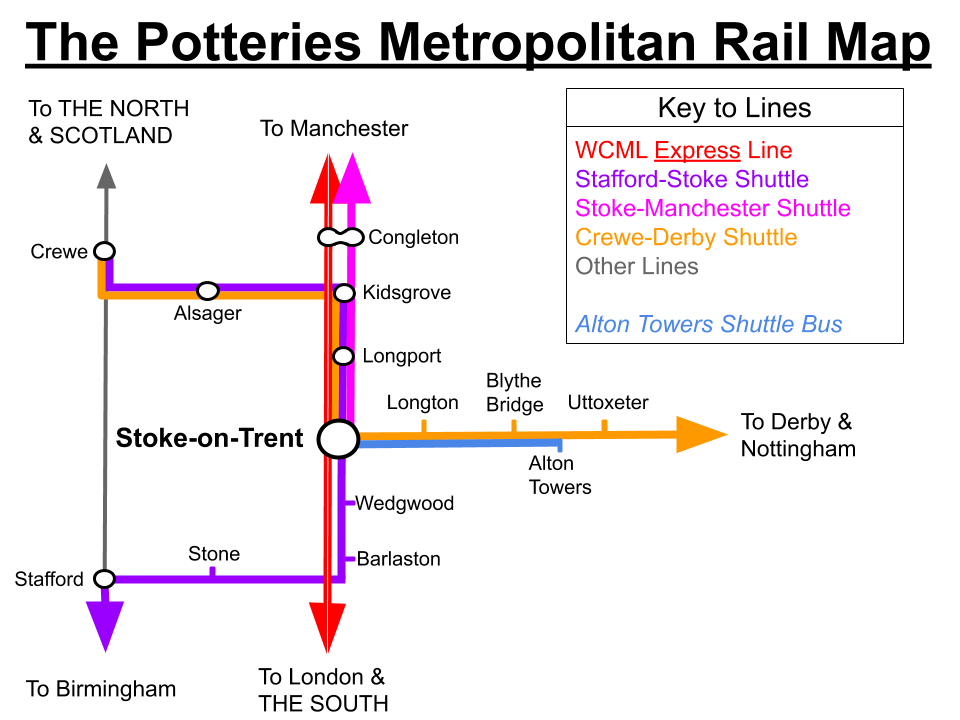
A diagram of local railway services in Stoke-on-Trent

Stoke-on-Trent railway station lies on the Stafford–Manchester and the Crewe-Derby lines. It is served by five train operating companies, which provide the following general services:

- Avanti West Coast operates inter-city services between Manchester Piccadilly, Stockport and London Euston
- CrossCountry runs inter-city services between Manchester Piccadilly and Birmingham New Street, which continue either to Bournemouth or Bristol Temple Meads
- East Midlands Railway operates services between Crewe, Derby, Nottingham and Newark Castle
- London Northwestern Railway runs services between Crewe, Stone and Stafford
- Northern Trains operates a stopping service to Stockport and Manchester Piccadilly.

The other stations in the city are Longport and Longton, which are both on the Crewe–Derby line. Avanti West Coast Pendolino no. 390129 is named after the city.

=== Buses ===
Services are operated primarily by First Potteries, along with D&G Bus. There are central bus stations in Hanley and Longton. Routes connect the city's six constituent towns, along with Biddulph and Newcastle-under-Lyme.

Between 2013/14 and 2023, bus service provision in the city shrank by 50%.

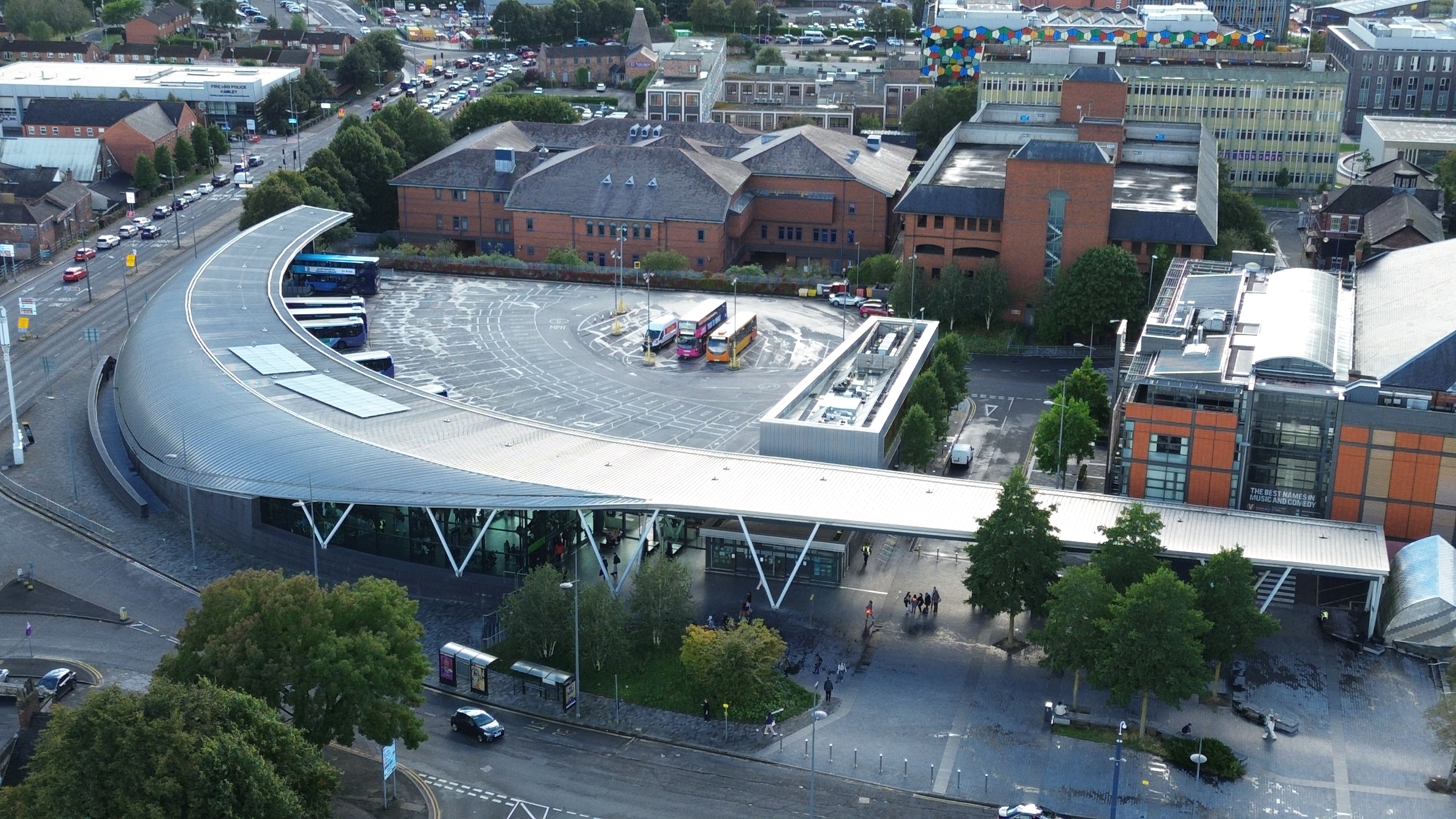
Hanley Bus Station

National Express and Flixbus operate long-distance coach services from Hanley bus station; destinations include London, Birmingham, Blackpool, Liverpool and Manchester.

=== Canals ===
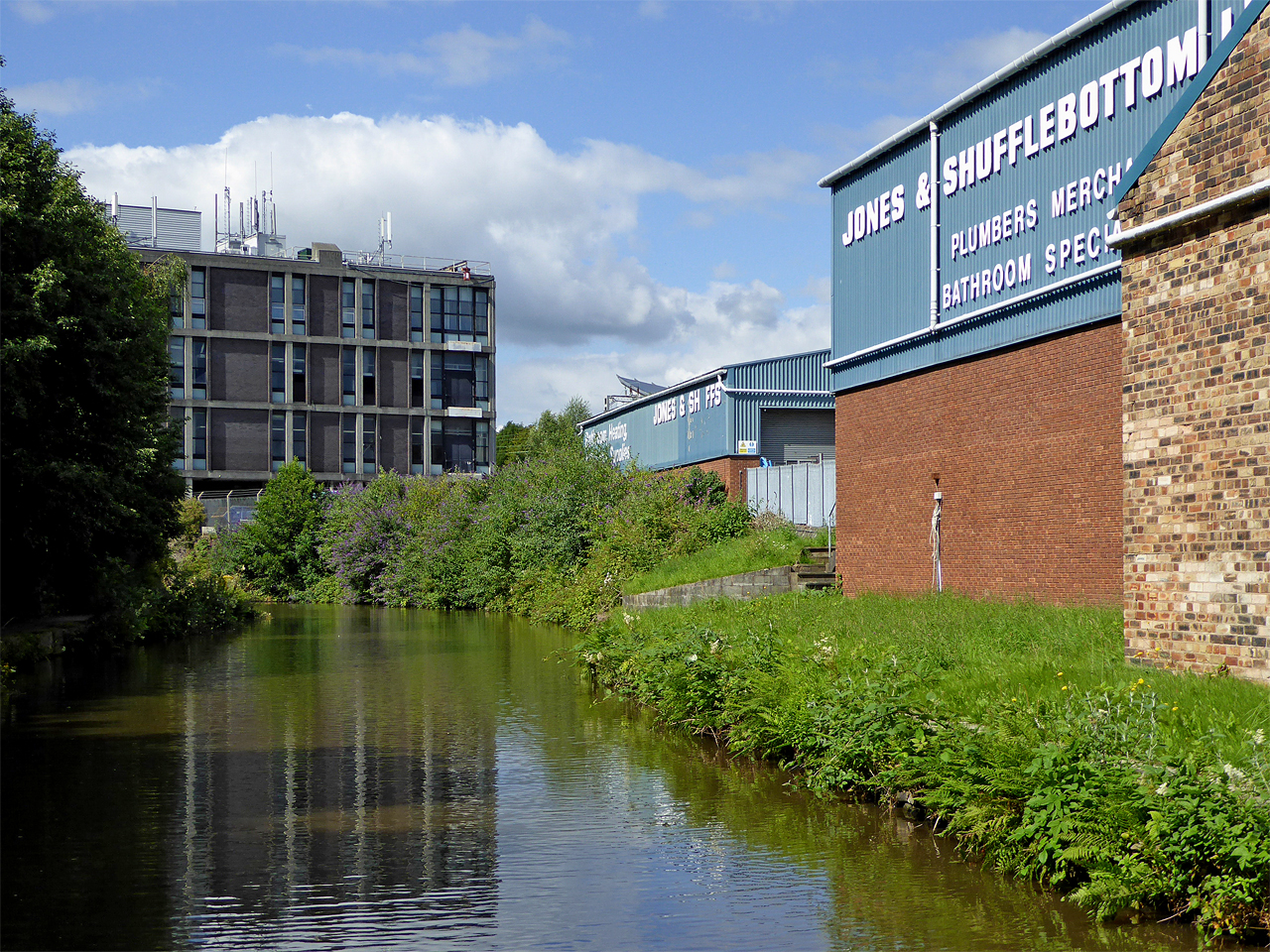
The canal at Stoke

The city is served by the Trent and Mersey Canal, which sees traffic of some 10,000 boats a year. The Caldon Canal branches off from the Trent and Mersey Canal at Etruria, within the city boundaries, going to Froghall with one branch going to Leek.

=== Cycling ===
As of November 2009, there were 77 miles (124 km) of new National Cycle Network off-road bicycle paths through the city, connecting to the national long-distance paths which were completed in 2005. Together with those in Newcastle-under-Lyme, there are now over 100 miles (160 km) of cycle paths in the urban conurbation. A further £10 million of funding has now been secured for the city's cycling network, to be spent in 2009–2011 through Cycling England's support for Stoke as a Cycling City.

== Education ==
=== Higher education ===
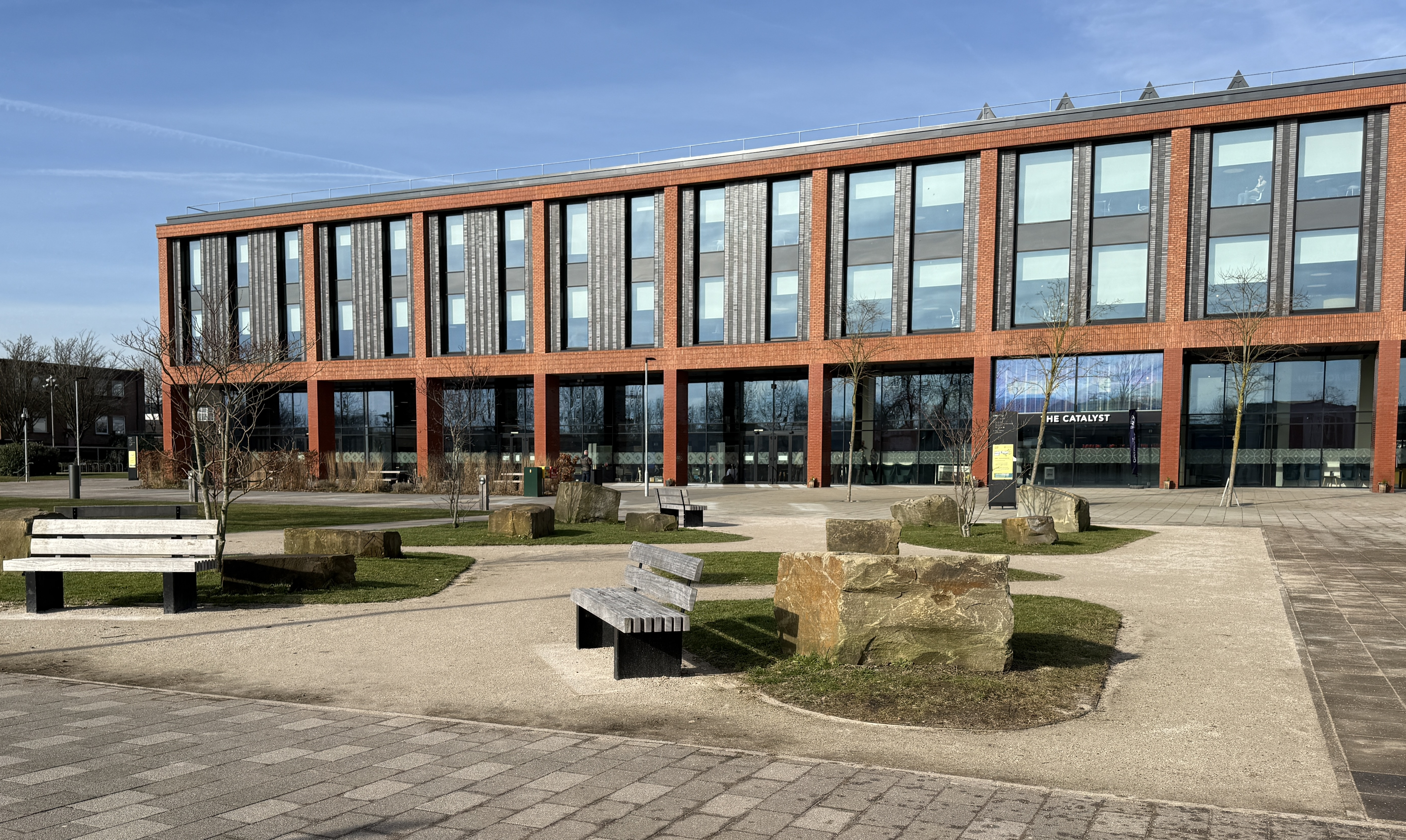
The Catalyst at the University of Staffordshire

There are four further and higher education institutions in the local area, the two further education colleges being City of Stoke-on-Trent Sixth Form College and Stoke-on-Trent College. Formerly of Fenton, now located in a newly built structure on Leek Road, the Sixth Form College provides A Level teaching for around 1,800 students. Stoke-on-Trent College is much larger and less specialised, offering apprenticeships and adult education; it has a main campus (Cauldon Campus) in Shelton and a secondary campus in Burslem.

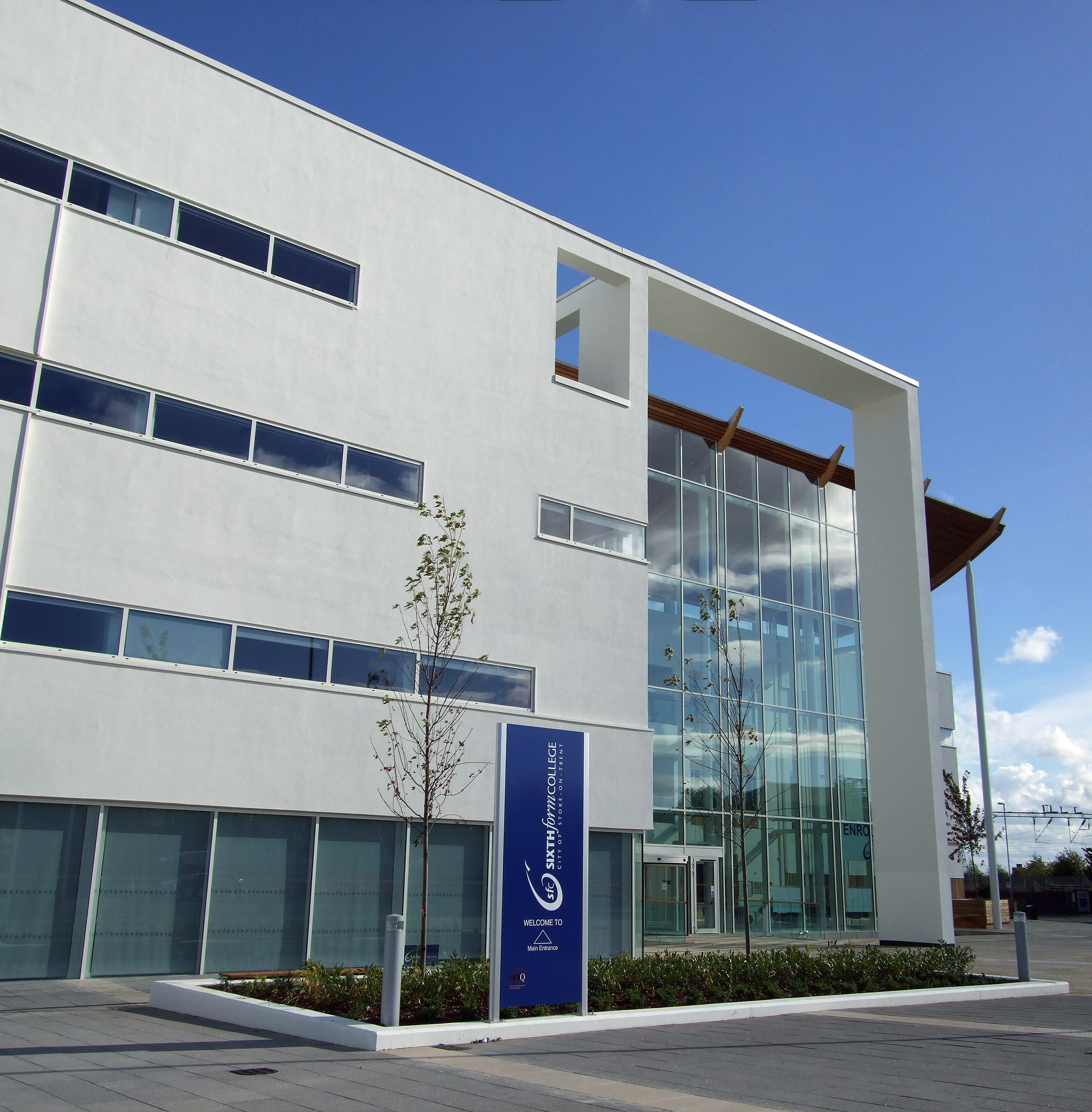
Stoke on Trent Sixth Form College

The city is home to University of Staffordshire, formerly North Staffordshire Polytechnic, with its main site in Shelton, near Stoke-on-Trent railway station. It gained its university status in 1992 as one of the post-1992 universities. Keele University School of Medicine uses facilities at the Royal Stoke University Hospital in Hartshill. Keele University was founded as the University College of North Staffordshire in 1949 with major involvement by Stoke-on-Trent City Council. It is located in the nearby village of Keele.

=== Secondary education ===
The city currently has 15 secondary schools: Sir Thomas Boughey Academy, Birches Head Academy, Co-op Academy Stoke-on-Trent, Discovery Academy, Excel Academy, Haywood Academy, Ormiston Horizon Academy, Ormiston Sir Stanley Matthews Academy, St Joseph's College, St Margaret Ward Catholic Academy, Ormiston Meridian Academy, St Peter's Academy, St Thomas More Catholic Academy, Stoke Studio College (with sites in Longton and Burslem), Thistley Hough Academy and Trentham High School.

A major restructure of Stoke-on-Trent's high school system was proposed in 2007. As part of these plans several established secondary schools closed or merged including Longton High School (closed 2010), Mitchell High and Edensor High (merged to form The Discovery Academy), St Peter's CE High School and Berry Hill High (merged to form St Peter's Academy).

=== Potters' Holidays ===
One of the legacies of the pottery industry was Stoke's version of the wakes week. Although better known in industrial Lancashire, the Stoke week is known locally as the Potters' Holidays or Potters' Fortnight and occurred the last week in June, the first week in July and another week in August. This gave what appeared to be strange school holidays, with the summer term having a two-week break at the end of June, then children returning to school for three weeks before taking a five-week summer holiday. This observance has disappeared from the local schools, due to decreased emphasis on traditional industries.

== Sport ==
=== Football ===
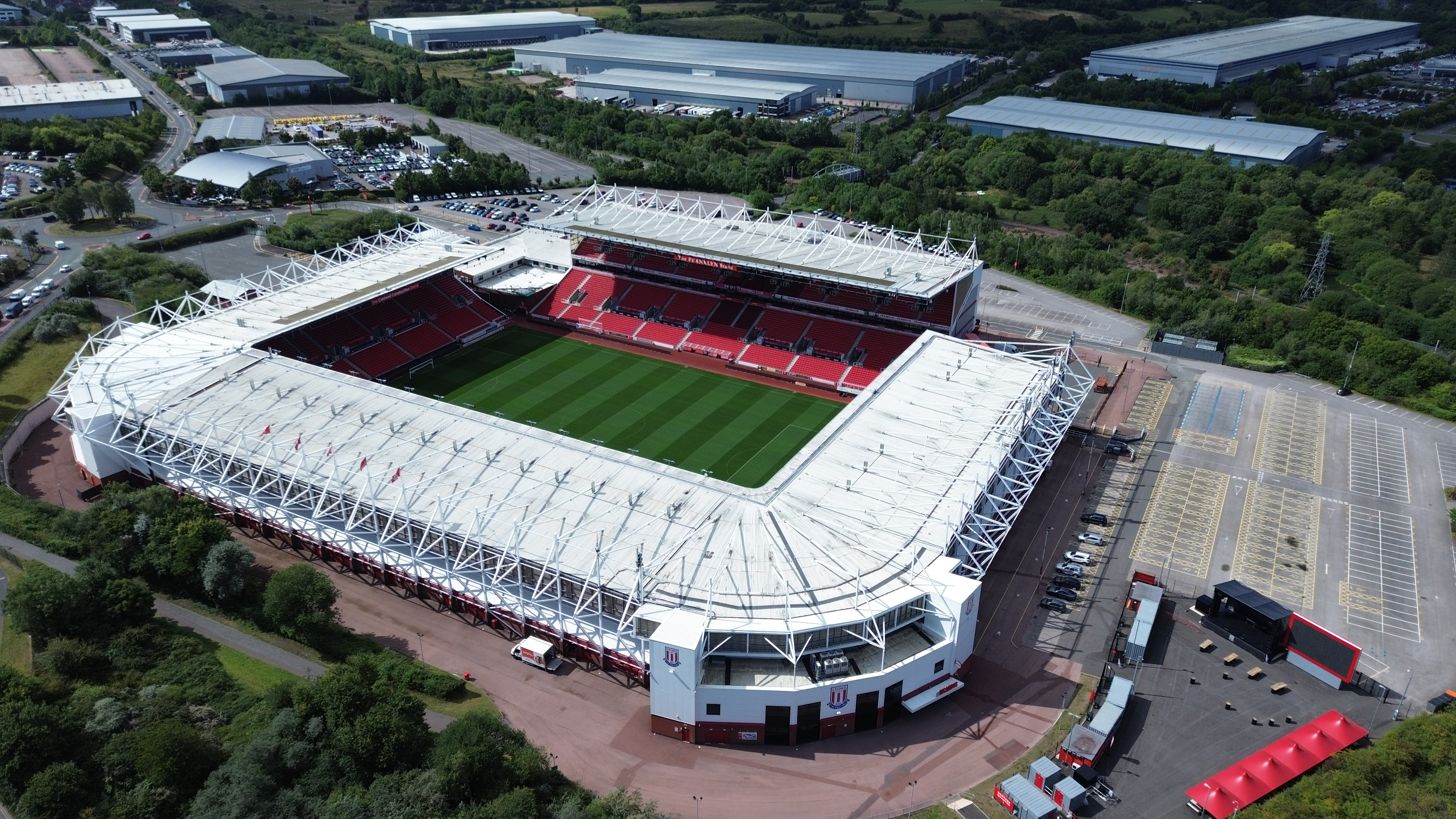
Stoke City's bet365 Stadium, opened in 1997, has a 30,089 capacity.

Stoke-on-Trent is the smallest city to boast two professional clubs in the English Football League (EFL). The club bearing the area's name is Stoke City, formed in 1863 and is the second-oldest professional football club in England. (Note: Notts County F.C., founded in 1862 in Nottingham, England, is officially recognized as the oldest professional football club in England and also in the world.) They currently play at the bet365 Stadium at Stanley Matthews Way, Stoke-on-Trent, which has been their home since 1997 when they relocated from the Victoria Ground in Stoke after 119 years. They were among the twelve founding members of the Football League in 1888. They won their first and, to date, only major trophy in 1972, when they lifted the League Cup.

In 1985, Stoke City were relegated from the First Division and began a 23-year exile from the top flight of English football which did not end until they won promotion in 2008, by which time the First Division had become the Premier League. Stoke City reached the final of the FA Cup for the first time in 2011, but were defeated by Manchester City. Stoke City were relegated from the Premier League in 2018.

The club and the city's most famous player is the late Sir Stanley Matthews, who began and ended his playing career with Stoke City, sandwiching 14 years at Blackpool where he played in what became known as the Matthews Final. He also managed Port Vale from 1965 to 1968. He was the first active footballer to receive a knighthood. Matthews made 54 appearances for the England national football team, scoring 11 times. There are two statues of Matthews in the city: one in Hanley and one at the Bet365 Stadium.

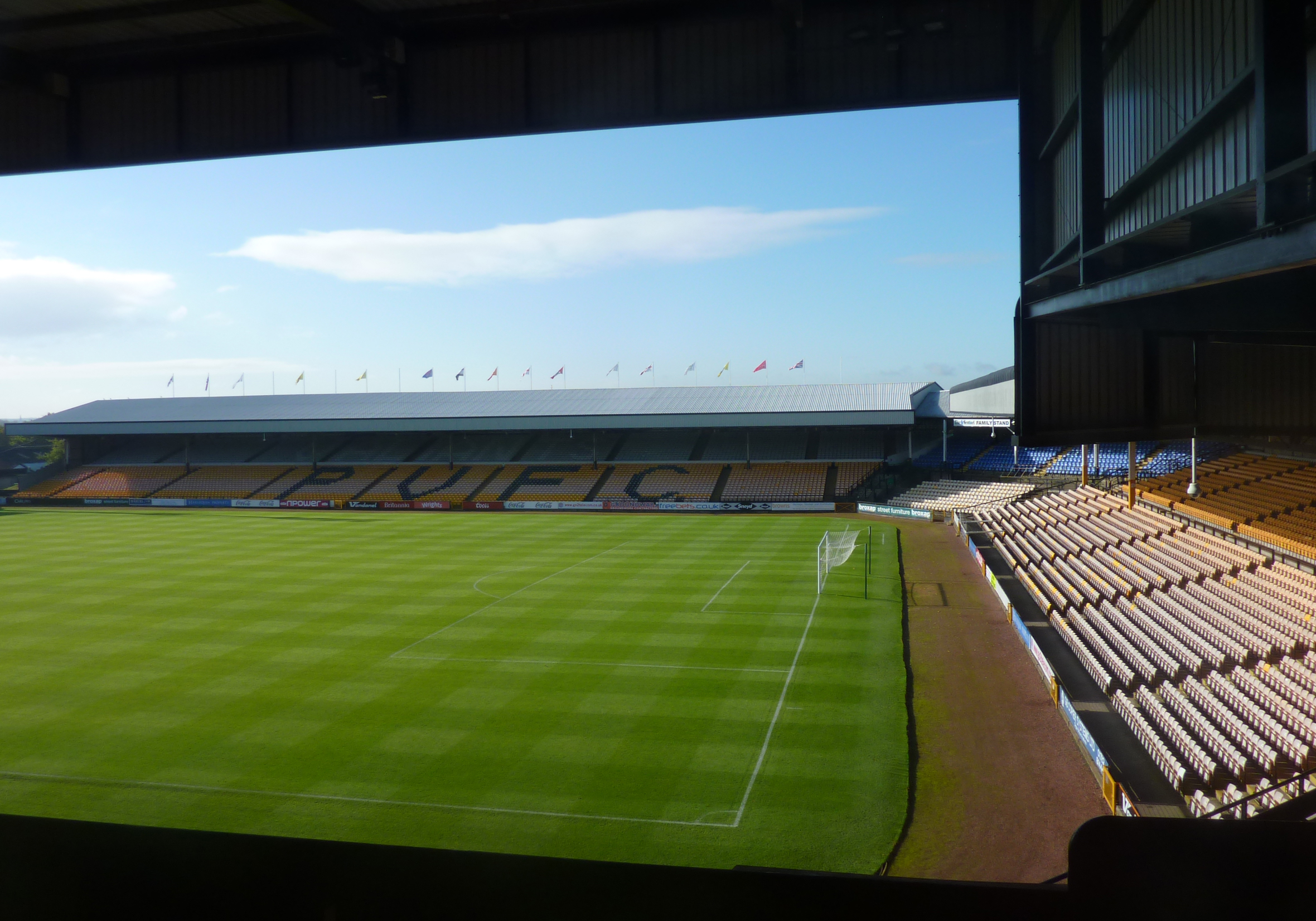
Vale Park, home of Port Vale. Completed in 1950, at the time of its construction it was nicknamed 'The Wembley of the North'.

The city's other professional football club is Port Vale, which was formed in 1876; it plays at Vale Park in the Burslem area. Previous stadiums include the Athletic Ground in Cobridge (1886–1913) and The Old Recreation Ground in Hanley (1913–1950). They joined the Football League in 1892 but were forced to resign in 1907 due to financial problems, only to return in 1919. Their highest league position came in 1931 when they finished fifth in the Second Division.

In 1954, while in the Third Division North, Port Vale progressed to the FA Cup semi-final when they were knocked out by First Division West Bromwich Albion at Villa Park. This remains the furthest they have progressed in the competition. Unlike Stoke City, their local rivals in the Potteries derby, they have never played top division football and hold the record for most years spent in the second tier without ever playing in the first. Individuals of note include John Rudge (who managed the club for 16 years from 1983 to 1999) and Roy Sproson (who made a club record 842 appearances for the club from 1950 until 1972 and was later their manager).

Previous clubs from the city include Dresden United, a club which was disestablished before the city was federated; as well as amateur clubs Meir KA (1972–2010) and Norton United (1989–2015). Currently, the city is represented at amateur level by Eastwood Hanley (1946–1997; re-established in 2014) and Hanley Town (established 1966).

=== Other sports teams ===
The city has several amateur sports clubs, including:

- Rugby union, with clubs such as Stoke-on-Trent RUFC
- Cricket, with clubs in Stoke competing in the North Staffs and South Cheshire Cricket League. The cricket ground in Longton is one of the venues used by Staffordshire County Cricket Club. As well as the Longton club, Meir Heath Cricket Club are also active, though the County Ground and the Michelin Ground are no longer used for cricket.
- Field hockey clubs based in the area compete in the Midlands Hockey League and the BUCS leagues. These are North Stafford, University of Staffordshire and Keele University hockey clubs.
- Speedway; the city's team is the Stoke Potters. It was staged at the Greyhound Stadium in Sun Street in Hanley intermittently between 1929 and 1939. In 1947, the Potters were part of the post-war boom rising from Division Three of the National League to Division Two before closing in the early 1950s. The Potters were revived in 1960 and they raced in the Provincial League until the end of 1963, when the stadium was closed and the site redeveloped. Speedway was revived at Loomer Road Stadium in Newcastle-under-Lyme, initially as Chesterton, before it reverted to the Stoke name. The stadium is also used for BriSCA Formula 1 Stock Cars and BriSCA Formula 2 Stock Cars during the summer.
- Cycle Speedway was popular in the city from the 1940s. The most famous team in the 1960s was the Shelton Tigers; they travelled across England and Wales to race against other teams. The Tigers won the Midland League and the British Champion of Champions Trophy, against Southampton.
- A Ski race team is based at the artificial ski slope in Festival Park.

=== Individual sportspeople ===
The city has a sporting Hall of Fame, opened in 2011 to honour sporting legends from the city. Former Stoke City and England footballer Stanley Matthews and former darts world champion Phil Taylor were the first names to be inducted into the Hall of Fame. They were followed by former Port Vale footballer Roy Sproson and England's World Cup winning goalkeeper Gordon Banks (who spent five years with Stoke City).

The World Professional Darts Championship was hosted in the Jollees venue in the south of the city from 1979 to 1985. Phil Taylor has won the World Championship a record 16 times, winning the championship in both the Professional Darts Corporation (PDC) and British Darts Organisation (BDO). Two-time PDC World Champion Adrian Lewis and two-time BDO World Champion Ted Hankey are also from the Stoke area. Other well-known players from or based in Stoke include Chris Mason, Andy Hamilton and Ian White.

World champion squash player, Great Britain and England international Angela Smith, was born in the city and was largely responsible for the ladies' game going open. She is regarded as one of the most famous players of British squash. Wicket-keeper Bob Taylor, who played for Derbyshire and England was born and still lives in the area. He represented England 58 times and still holds the world record for the most dismissals in the first-class game (1649). In golf, Trenthams' David Lynn, the golfer, (born 1973) was the KLM Open Champion of 2004.

Other notable sportspeople from the area include footballer Aaron Ramsdale and former players turned pundits Mark Bright, Garth Crooks and Robbie Earle; tennis player Andrew Foster; snooker players Ray Reardon, Dave Harold and Jamie Cope; field hockey player Imran Sherwani; cycling world-record holder Tommy Godwin, wrestler Peter Thornley (better known as Kendo Nagasaki), professional strongman Eddie Hall and European taekwondo champion Charlie Maddock.

== Culture ==
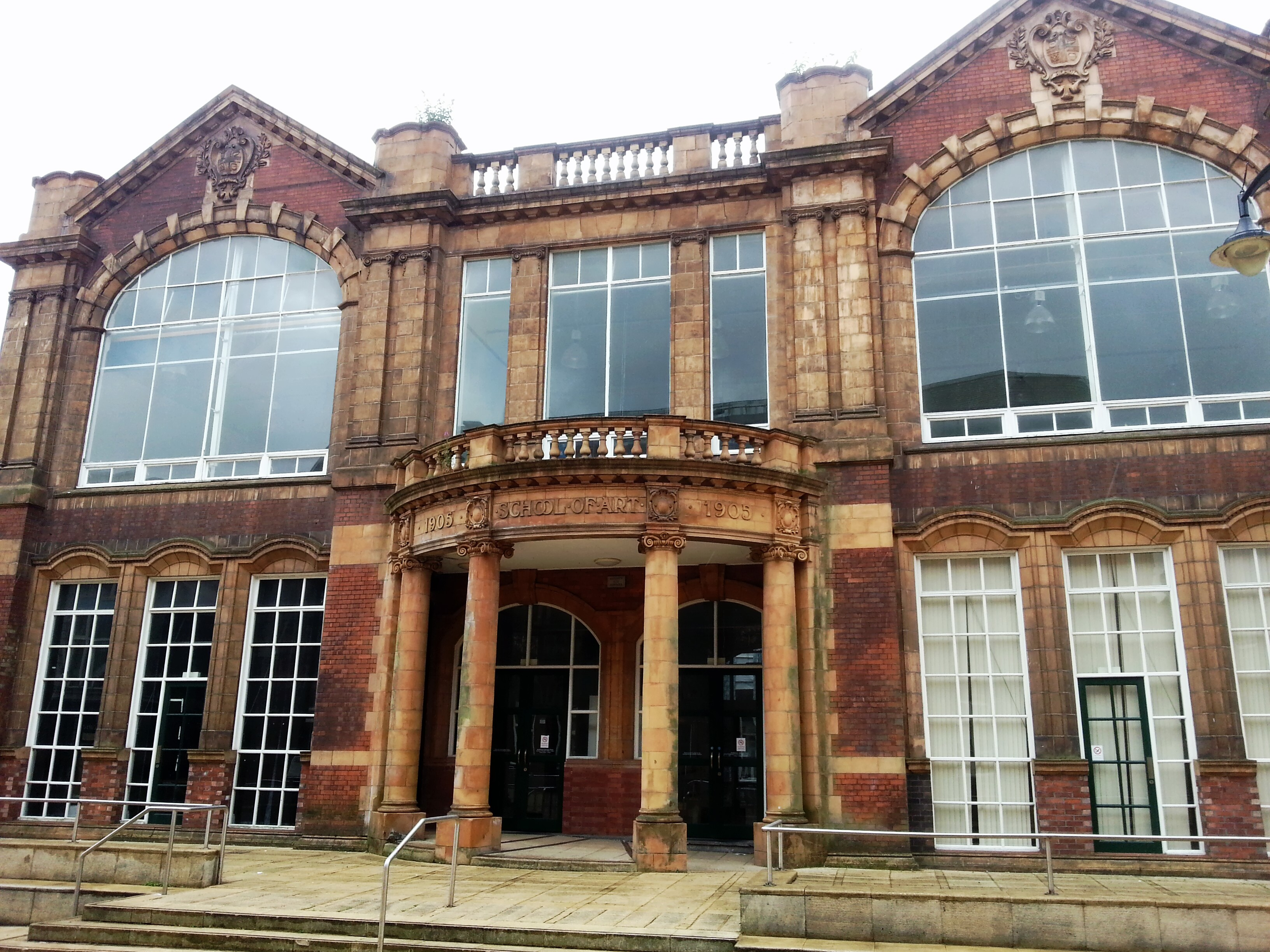
Burslem School of Art

=== Architecture ===
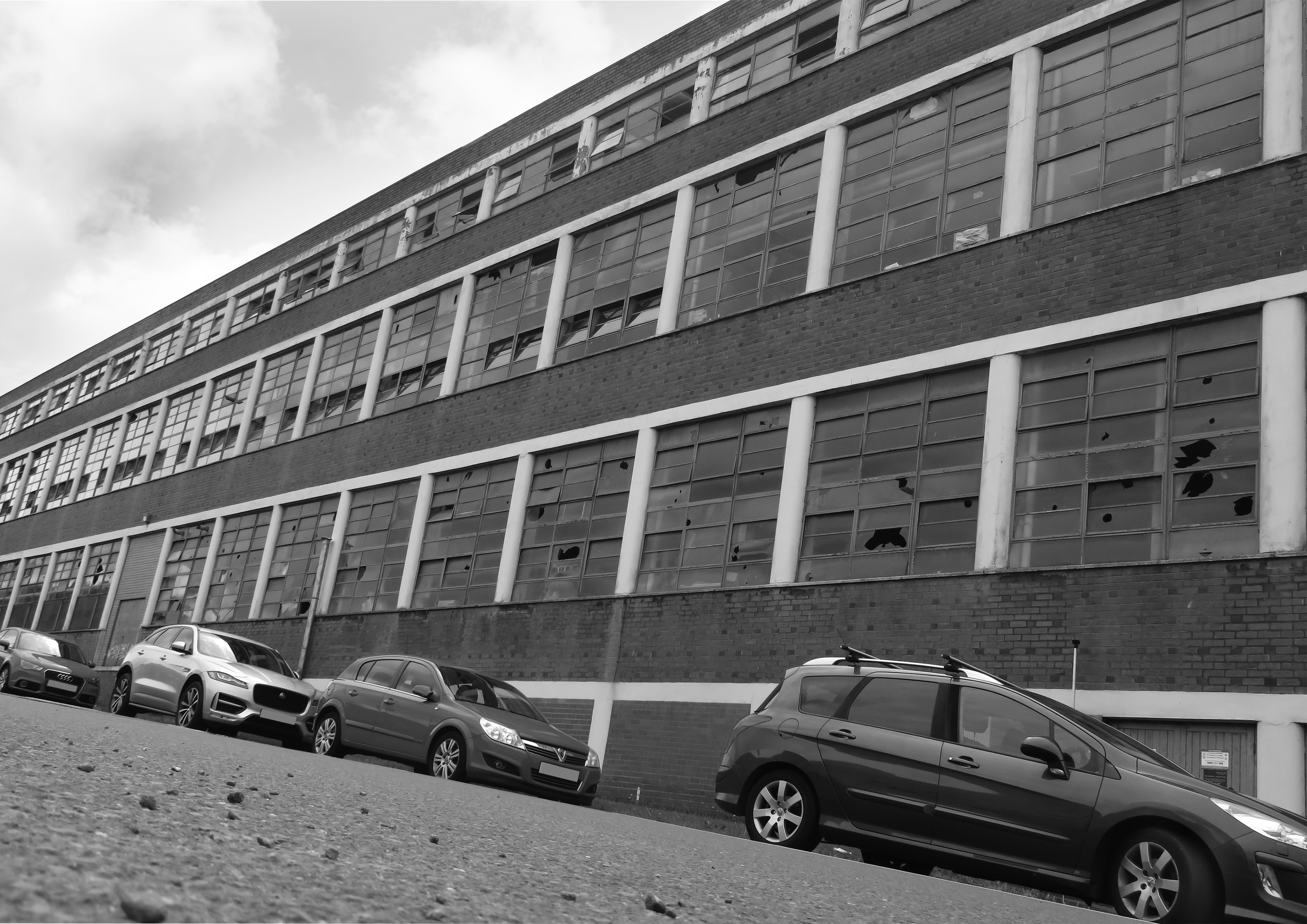
Colclough China Longton, a factory typical of the mid-20th century

The architecture of North Staffordshire has a history expressive of locally acquired or manufactured building materials, including: quarried stone, coal and clay for brick and tile-making, ash, sand gravel and cement for concrete; and also cast iron steel and timber. Examples include:

- The half-timbered farmhouse vernacular of Ford Green Hall
- The 18th-century canal-side Wedgwood estate of Etruria Works, one of the hubs of the Industrial Revolution
- 19th-century country house estates, such as Trentham Hall
- Railway buildings, including Stoke-on-Trent station
- The expansion and renewal of industrial, civic and amenity buildings, including the Potteries Museum and Art Gallery.

Stoke-on-Trent's architecture is tied closely to the industrial heritage of the city. Bottle ovens (used for early pottery manufacture), canal-side and railway-related mill, factory or warehouse buildings evolved – within the tightly knit street pattern of each of the six townships – from transport links and adjacency to local generationally skilled labour. Post-WWII pottery factories developed a style typified by open-plan manufacturing areas, surrounded by wide expanses of window-walling from floor to ceiling, allowing good daylighting for intricate tasks such as lithography, fettling and decoration.

In 1966, Stone-born Cedric Price had proposed a Potteries Thinkbelt design which sought to make use of decommissioned railway routes, following the Beeching cuts and the scarred landscape of coal mining to provide linked learning centres for a technical industry-based curriculum. The Staffordshire University Architecture course has introduced an annual Cedric Price Day celebrating this and other projects of his.

=== Art ===
==== Visual art ====
The major art gallery is The Potteries Museum & Art Gallery, located in Hanley. It contains a collection of fine ceramics, a rotating programme of exhibitions and a permanent collection. In 2010, it became one of the permanent homes of the Staffordshire Hoard, the most important collection of Anglo-Saxon gold yet found.

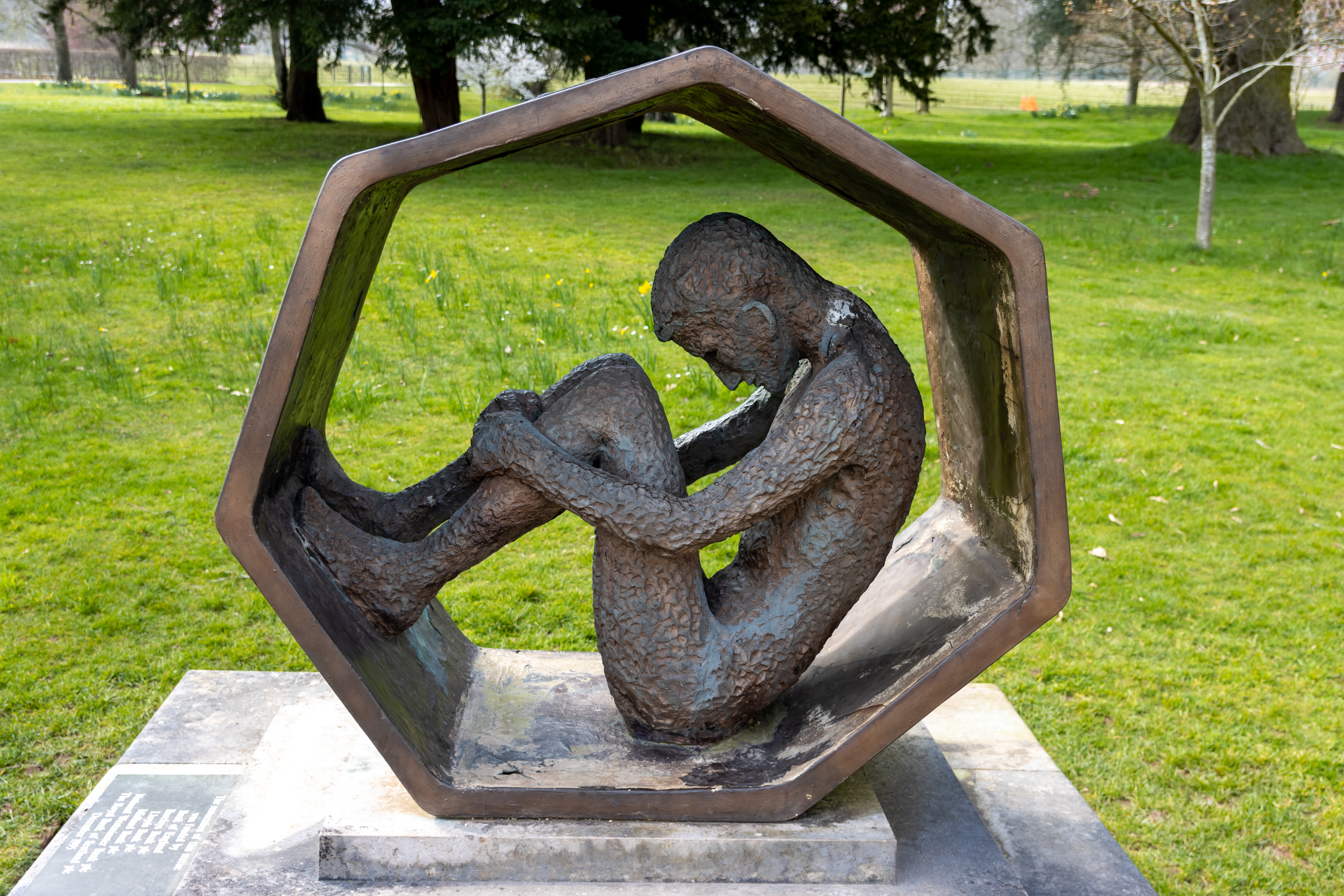
Robert Berkoff Bankers' Clearing House statue on the Trentham Estate

The city's Cultural Quarter in Hanley contains the Potteries Museum & Art Gallery, the Regent Theatre and the Victoria Hall. There are also smaller elements, including the independent Dazed Gallery and AirSpace, the city's only contemporary art gallery, artist-led and artist run. The Artbay Gallery in Fenton has a contemporary range of original works as well as limited editions.

Edwardian School of Art in Burslem has been refurbished with £1.2 million, and is now run without a public subsidy. The Hothouse Centre for Ceramic Design and the Roslyn Works complex of craft studios operate in Longton. Also based in Burslem is the Barewall Gallery, which has a large collection of work by local artists including original art by Arthur Berry (The Lowry of The Potteries), Jack Simcock, and by new emerging Potteries artists.

Stoke-on-Trent is the birthplace of several artists including Arthur Berry (also a novelist, playwright & poet), Glenys Barton (sculptor), Arnold Machin (sculptor, coin & stamp designer) and Sidney Tushingham, A.R.E.

==== Public art ====
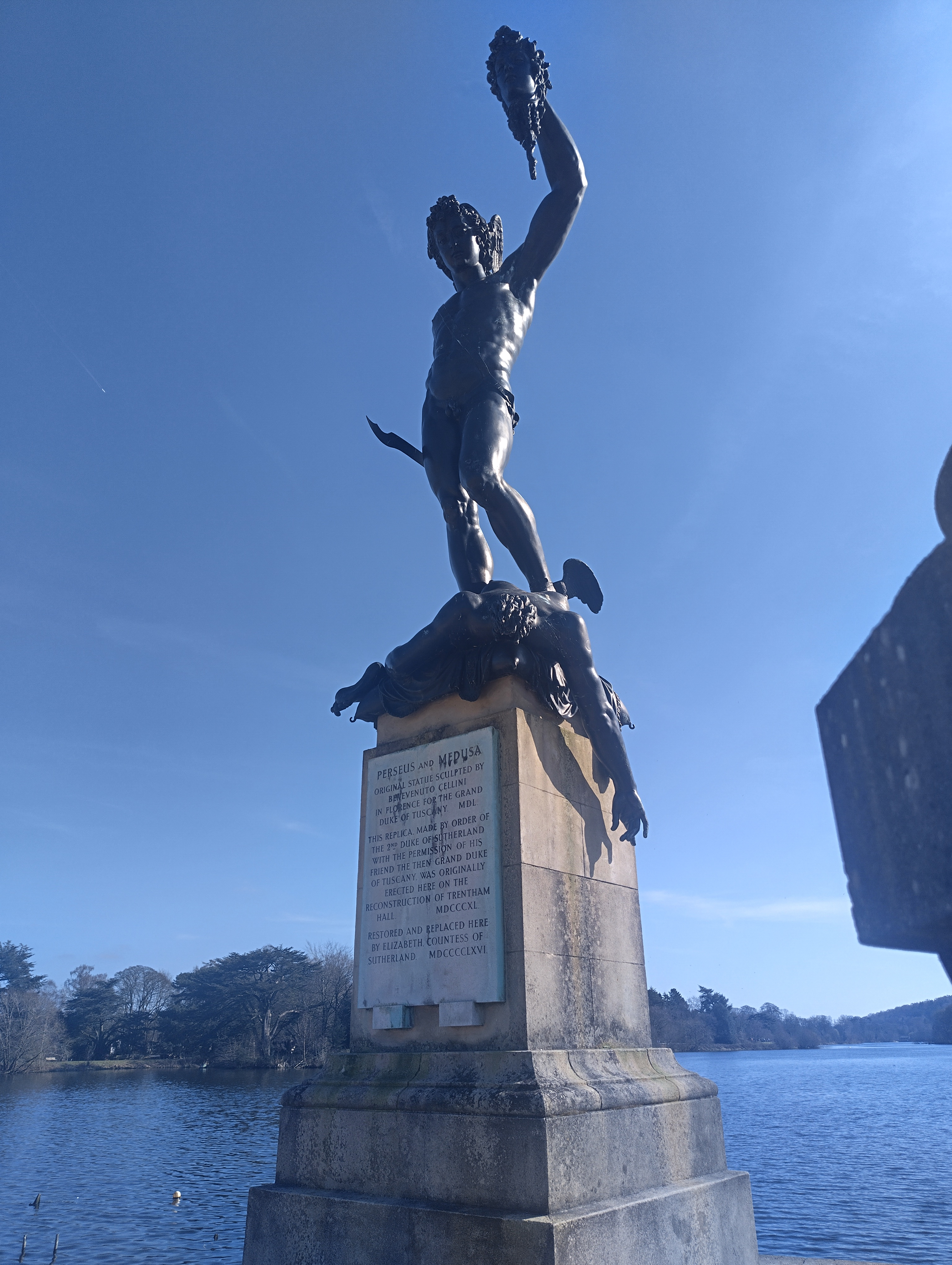
Perseus with the Head of Medusa sculpture by Benvenuto Cellini at Trentham Gardens

The Grade II* listed statue of Perseus with the Head of Medusa, which stands adjacent to the lake at Trentham Gardens, a part of Trentham Estate, is a copy of an original work by Benvenuto Cellini, which was sculpted for Cosimo I Duke of Tuscany from 1545 to 1554. In the early 19th century, the then Duke of Tuscany, allowed a cast of Cellini's statue to be taken for his friend, the 2nd Duke of Sutherland; it is the only bronze cast of the statue The bronze sculpture was installed at Trentham in 1840, during Charles Barry's remodelling of the estate, and the statue forms a focal point for his Italianate gardens located by the lake at the south end of the central axis of the parterre. Barry designed the circular platform on which the statue is set.

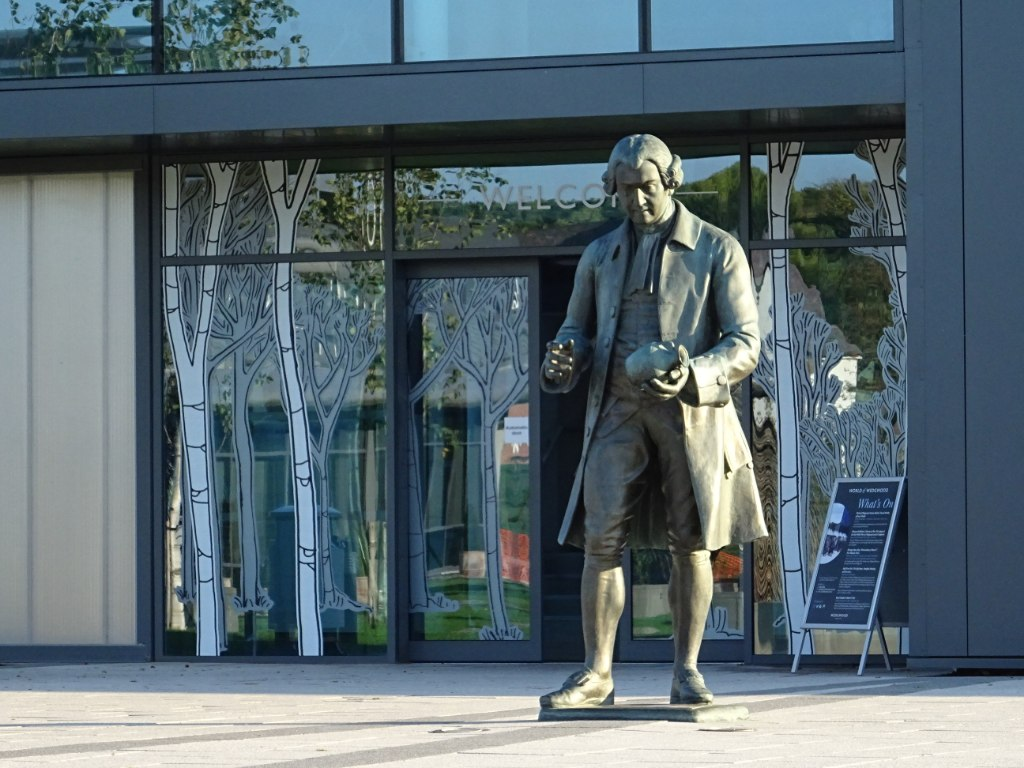
Statue of Josiah Wedgwood near the World of Wedgwood museum

Welcoming visitors to the city as they alight from their train at Stoke-on-Trent station is a statue of Josiah Wedgwood, the centrepiece to the Grade II listed Winton Square area. The statue by Edward Davis was cast in bronze in 1860 and first displayed at the 1862 London Exhibition (also known as the International Exhibition of 1862) which was the successor to the 1851 Great Exhibition. Funded by public subscription, the Stoke-on-Trent unveiling took place on 24 February 1863. A replica of the statue was cast in the 1950s for the Wedgwood Barlaston factory site, where it now stands – outside the Wedgwood Museum. In Josiah's hand is an example of his pre-eminent work, the Portland Vase.

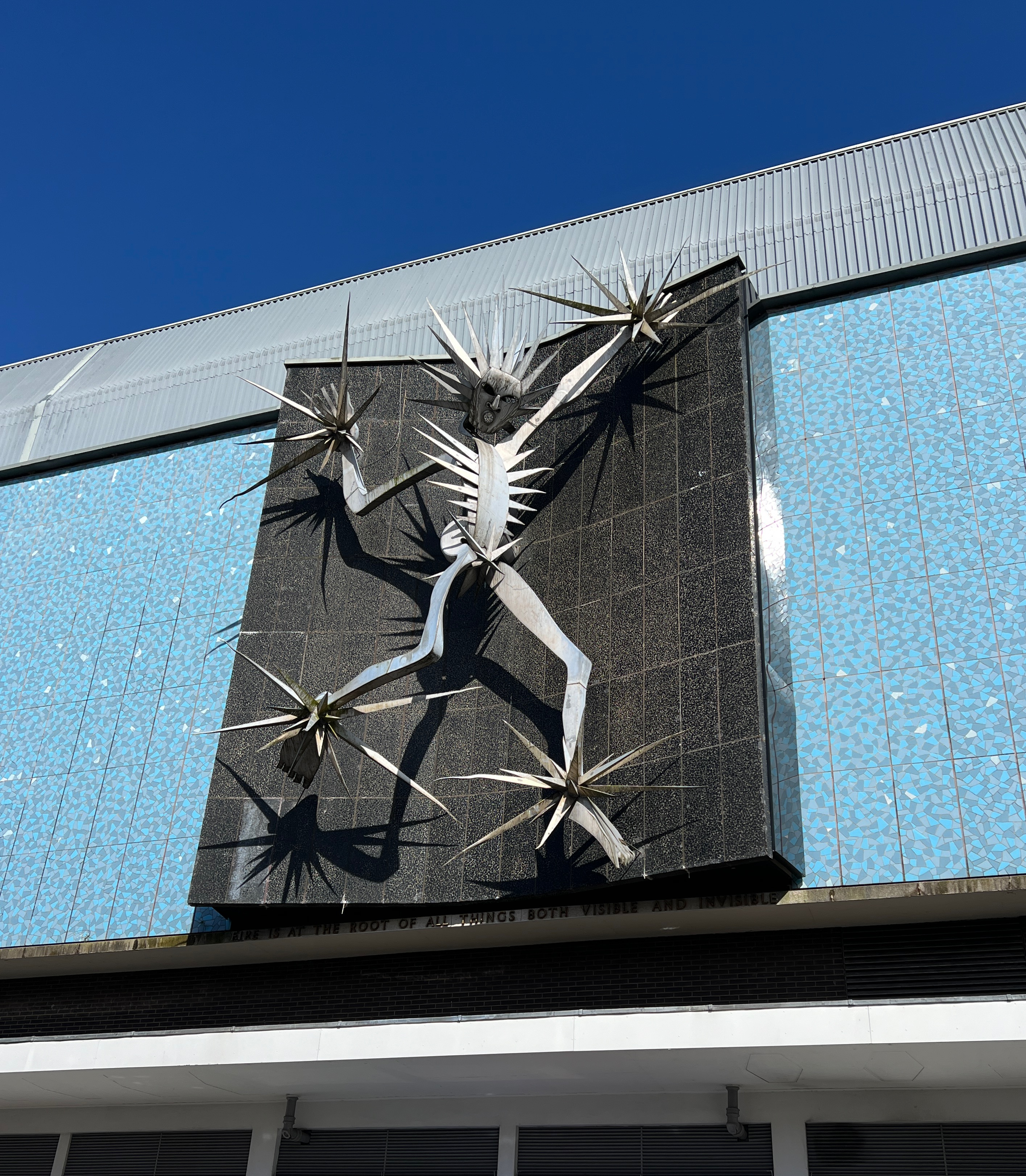
Man of Fire, a 1964 sculpture installed on the Lewis's store (later Debenhams), in Hanley

The Spirit of Fire also known as The Man of Fire or sometimes locally as Jack Frost or even The Spiky Man, a 1964 sculpture by David Wynne, is mounted upon the façade of what was the Lewis's Department Sore (designed by the Percy Thomas Partnership). The inscription below the sculpture reads: "Fire is at the root of all things visible and invisible" – a reference to the industrial heart of The Potteries: ceramics, railways, steelmaking and mining.

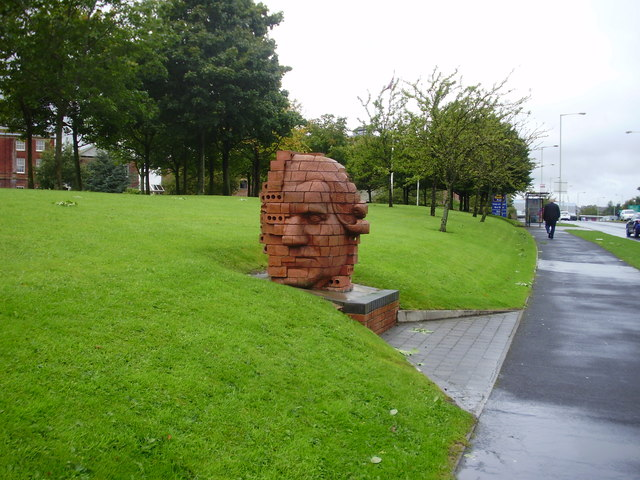
"CAPO" Modernist Sculpture depicting the head of Josiah Wedgwood by Vincent Woropay, © Eirian Evans via Geograph

CAPO, a modern interpretation depicting the head of Josiah Wedgwood by Vincent Woropay was originally commissioned by Stoke-on-Trent City Council for the 1986 National Garden Festival. It was moved in 2009 to an appropriate site in Festival Way close to Wedgwood's Etruria Hall home. In February 2023, the statue was demolished by council contractors during works to widen the road. A subsequent investigation led to the resignation of the deputy council leader as the work had not been correctly planned or authorised by the council. The leader of the council has pledged to have the statue restored

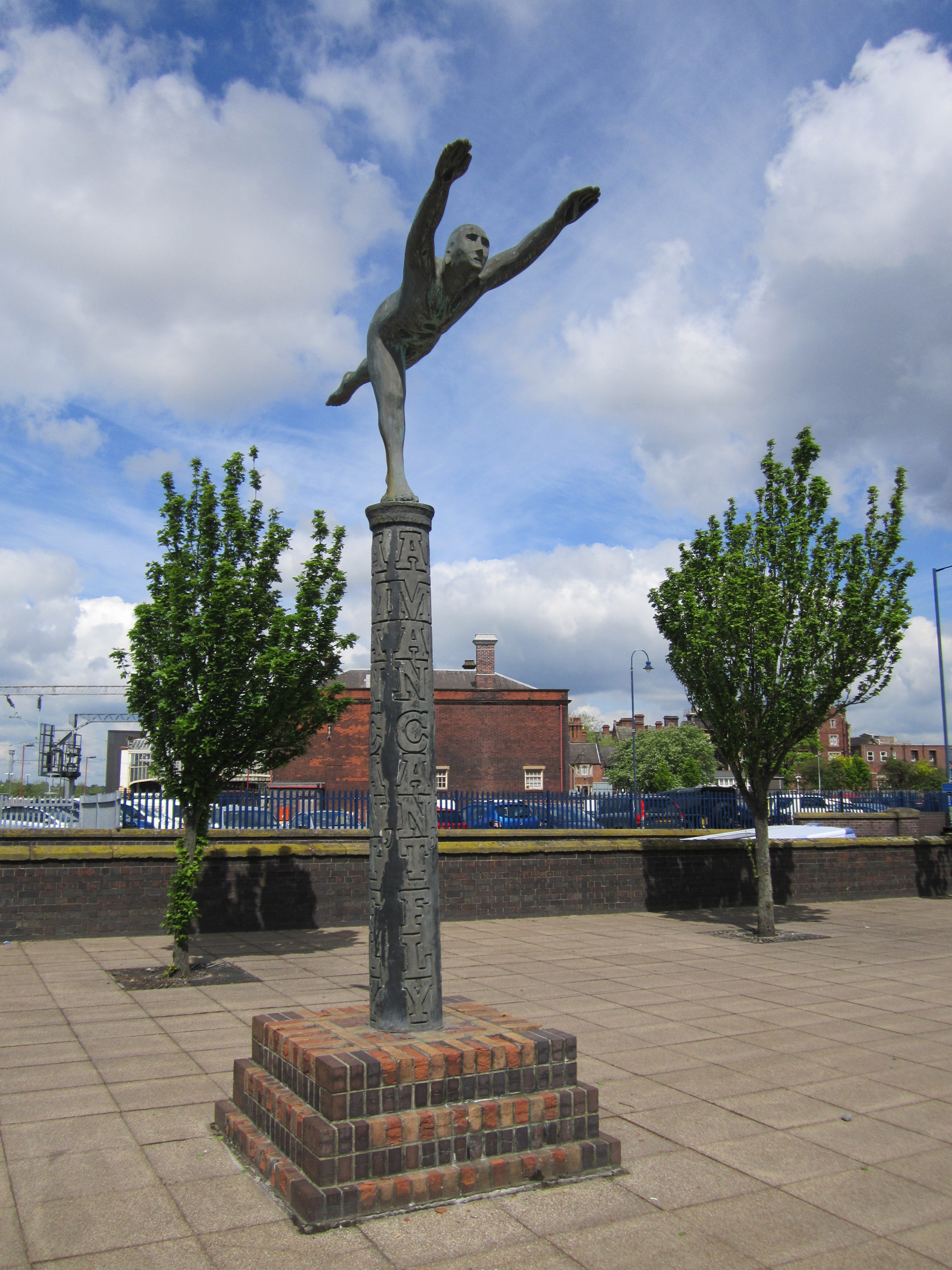
A Man Can't Fly sculpture

A Man Can't Fly, commissioned by Stoke-on-Trent City Council in 1989, is a statue of "a figure of a man balancing horizontally upon one leg" (arabesque, a ballet pose), by Cheshire sculptor Ondre Nowakowski (b.1954). The pose appears as a reference to Superman in flight. It stands atop a column with the words 'A MAN CAN'T FLY' repeated vertically around its circumference". The location is at the Leek Road/ Glebe Street junction, close to Stoke station.

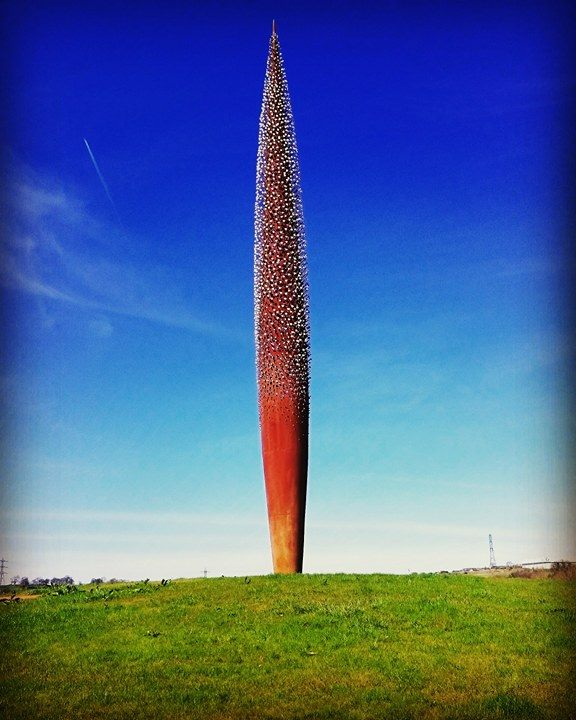
The Golden sculpture, March 2017

The outskirts of Tunstall became home to a new public art statue called Golden in 2015. The 69 ft (21m) steel work of art by Wolfgang Buttress was privately funded with £180,000 Section 106 monies and is made from COR-TEN Steel, the same material as the Angel of the North. The tapered lozenge design features powerful LED lights that will illuminate 1,500 glass prisms containing the written wishes or memories of local residents. Each prism will be suspended from the main body of the sculpture by a short arm, giving the artwork a bristly appearance. It is located on the former site of the Potteries Pyramid, which was to have been moved to a nearby roundabout.

In October 2013, a sculpture, Unearthed (Lidice) designed by Sarah Nadin (b.1983) and Nicola Winstanley (b.1984) also known as Dashyline studios, commemorating the efforts of miners to rebuild the Czech village of Lidice devastated during the Second World War was unveiled. The 6.8-metre-high (22 ft 4 in) steel sculpture cost £100,000 to build and features 3,000 tags bearing the initials of people who promise to share the story of the 1942 Lidice Shall Live movement. North Staffordshire-based Dashyline was commissioned by Stoke-on-Trent City Council to create the artwork, which has been installed near Hanley bus station. The sculpture was manufactured and installed by local Company, Patera Engineering Ltd based in Fenton. In 2018 a pear tree, grafted from the protected pear tree which survived the destruction of Lidice, was planted in Stoke-on-Trent to commemorate the Lidice Shall Live campaign.

Arnold Bennett Statue This statue celebrates the city's most famous literary son, Arnold Bennett. It was unveiled on 27 May 2017, on what would have been his 150th birthday. Located on Bethesda Street on the approach to the Potteries Museum and Art Gallery in Hanley, the work was commissioned by the Arnold Bennett Society, and funded by the Denise Coates Foundation – then, gifted to the city. The seated figure was created by local sculptors Michael Talbot and Carl Payne.

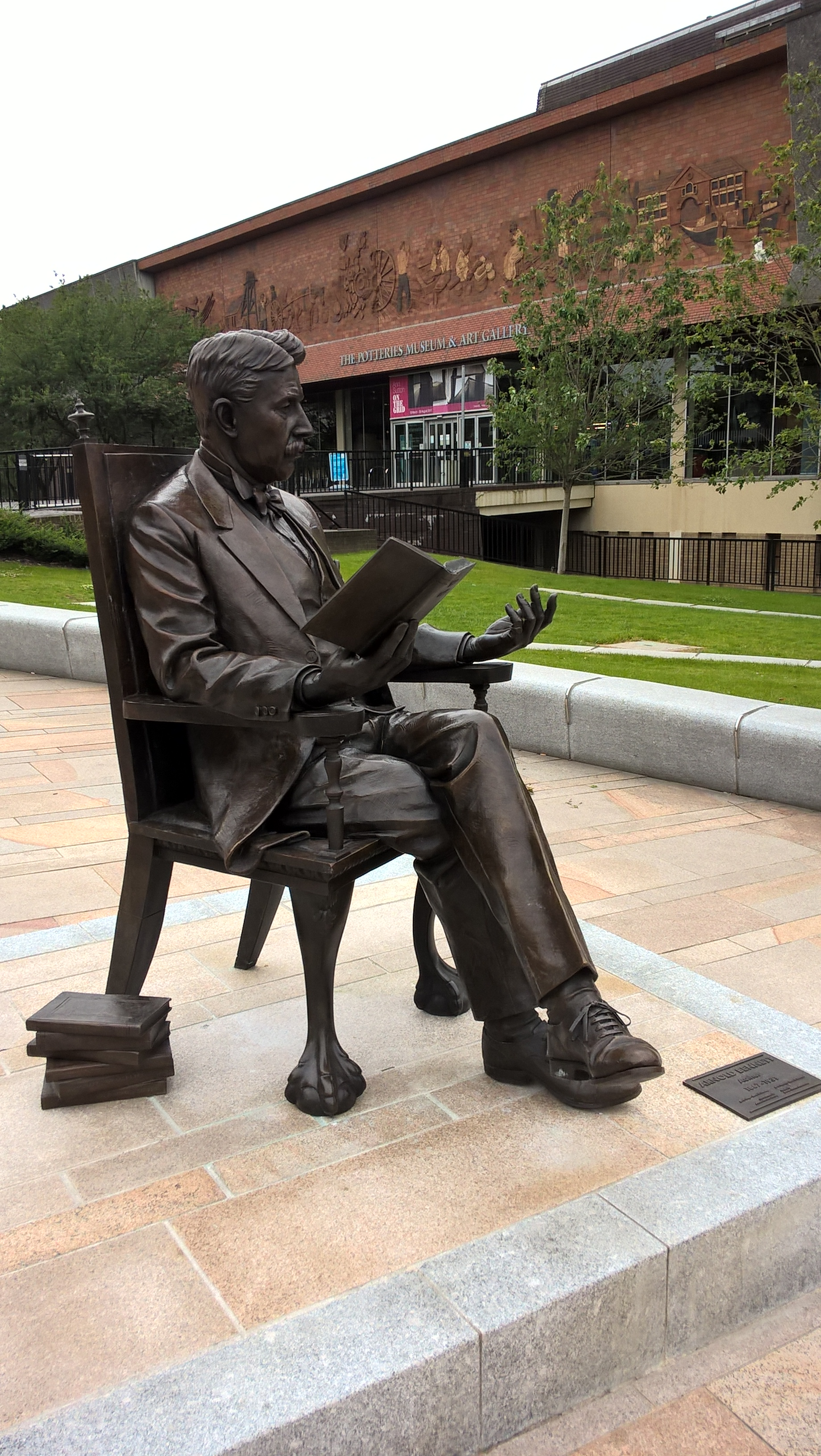
Arnold Bennett Statue Hanley, located on the approach to Potteries Museum and Art Gallery

==== Theatre and Performing Arts ====
The city's main theatre is the 1,603-person capacity Regent Theatre, which is in Hanley. Nearby is the main concert hall, the Victoria Hall. The purpose-built theatre in the round New Vic Theatre is just outside the city's boundary in Newcastle-under-Lyme. The Victorian Kings Hall in Stoke-on-Trent Town Hall is used for smaller events. In Burslem, the Queen's Theatre has been refurbished and restored at private expense.

The Stoke-on-Trent Repertory Theatre is based in Stoke and puts on amateur productions. The previously city council-run Mitchell Memorial Youth Theatre, based in Hanley, completed its £4.3m refurbishment in 2011 and is now known as the Mitchell Arts Centre. It is named in honour of one of the city's most famous sons, Reginald Mitchell, designer of the World War II fighter plane, the Spitfire.

The city also has been the home to some long-running cultural organisations, including B arts, founded in the 80s as an all-female-led, participatory arts organisation. The founders were street theatre directors Hilary Hughes, Gill Gill and Yvonne Male.

==== Cinema ====
In December 2015, a new nine-screen Cineworld cinema opened in Hanley. It is situated at The Hive which is an extension to the Intu Potteries shopping centre. There is an Odeon multiplex cinema located in Festival Park. The independent volunteer-run art-house cinema, The Stoke-on-Trent Film Theatre, is located very near the railway station; it shows art-house and subtitled films, as well as films that have finished their run in larger cinemas.

==== Literature ====
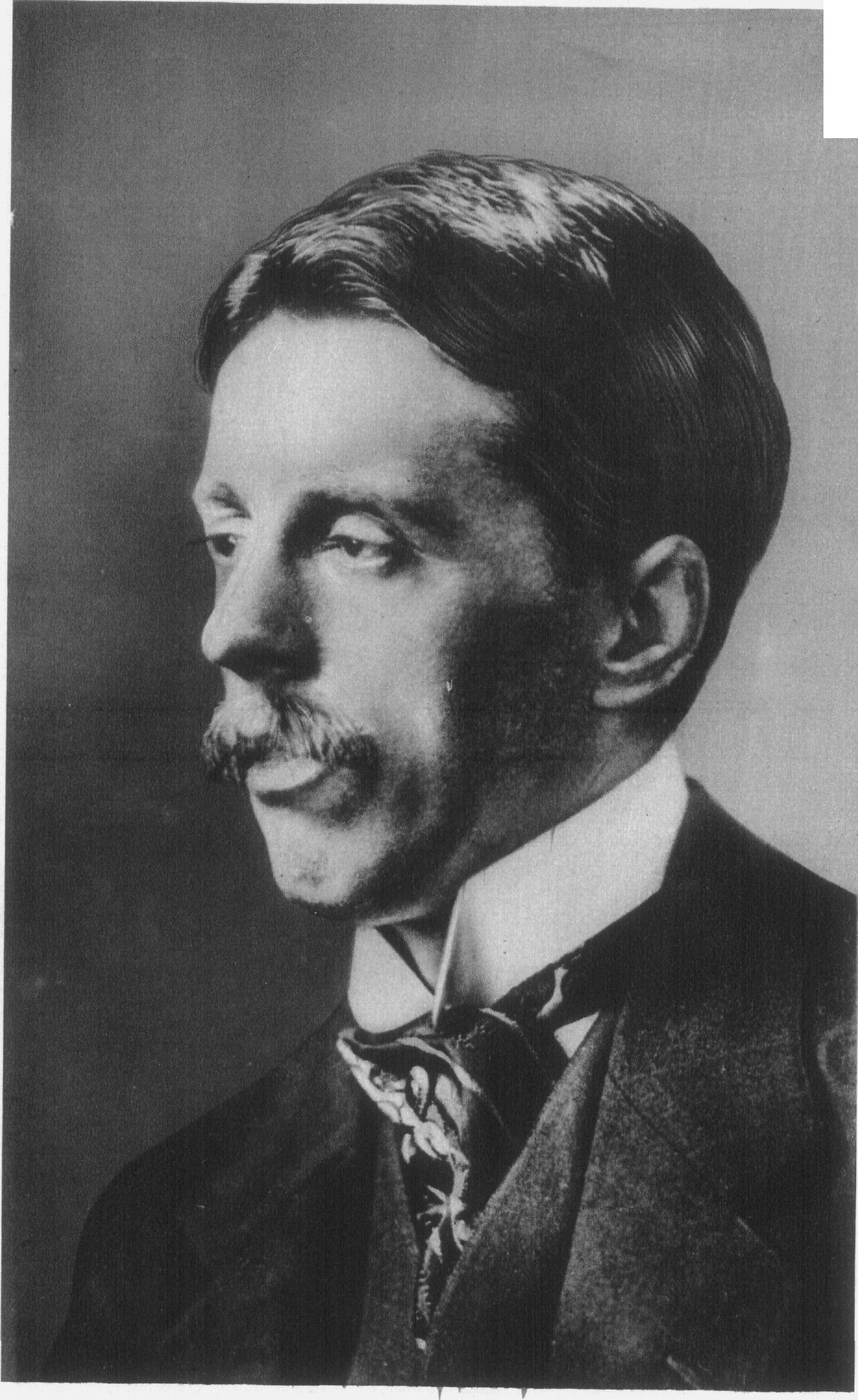
Arnold Bennett, raised in Hanley

Through the works of Arnold Bennett, described by some as the greatest realist writer of the 20th century, the "Six Towns" were sometimes known as the "Five Towns". In his novels, Bennett wrote about local events in the 19th century and consistently changed all proper names and associations, thus Hanley became Hanbridge and Burslem became Bursley. The Six Towns were not federated until 1910 when Fenton was still relatively new. It was the smallest in terms of population and area. Bennett also changed the name of the local newspaper from The Sentinel to The Signal, an identity that was subsequently adopted by the city's commercial radio station.

Other notable contributors to literature include Elijah Fenton (poet), Peter Whelan (playwright), John Wain (poet, critic and scholar), Pauline Stainer (poet) and Charles Tomlinson (poet, graphic artist, translator, editor and critic).

In Jorge Luis Borges' novel, "The Garden of Forking Paths", Dr. Yu Tsun goes to a suburb of Fenton to meet Stephen Albert.

==== Young Poet Laureate ====
Since 2010, the council's library service has run a competition to appoint a Young Poet Laureate for the city. This is a competition for local poets aged between 11 and 19. The first winner was Daniel Tatton, and he was succeeded in 2011 by Bethanie Hardie.

==== Music ====
Stoke has a vibrant music scene. The Golden Torch, a local nightclub, became the centre of the Northern soul scene in the early 1970s. Shelley's Laserdome nightclub in Longton played a pivotal role in the house and rave scene of the late 1980s and early 1990s, helping launch the career of Sasha and featuring regular appearances from Carl Cox, until it was eventually shut down by Staffordshire Police. The Void, a Hanley nightclub, developed a sister relationship with Sankey's Soap in Manchester, helping the latter to revive its fortunes during the late 1990s via the promotion of a club night called Golden.

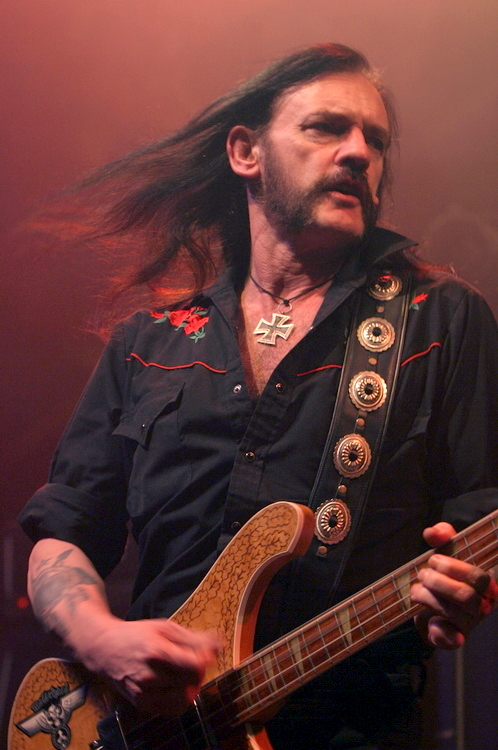
Lemmy, born in Burslem

Other notable individuals and groups from the area include Andy Moor who is a DJ and producer, Gertie Gitana (music hall star and singer), Lemmy, the founder of the rock band Motörhead, Patricia Leonard (singer/contralto), Jem Finer (banjoist, The Pogues), Broken Bones and Discharge (punk band), who invented the D-beat style. Experimental musician Phil Todd, best known for his Ashtray Navigations project, grew up in Madeley. Other bands to hail from the city include: This Is Seb Clarke (soul-punk), Agent Blue (alternative rock), All the Young and The Title (indie).

In October 2007, Stoke-on-Trent City Council introduced a new theme tune: "Moving Forwards Together". It was described by the council as "part of our drive to help us move the city forward and create a better Stoke-on-Trent for people to live, learn, work and enjoy."

Murdoc Niccals, a fictional member of the group Gorillaz with the role of bass guitarist, is (in his constructed biography) said to have been born in Stoke-on-Trent.

Havergal Brian (1876–1972), the classical composer and music writer, who composed 32 symphonies and five operas, was born in Stoke (in Dresden). The large scale and unfashionable style of his compositions led to them being neglected for most of his lifetime and not a note of his music was commercially issued on record during his lifetime. He died without having heard many of his finest works.

==== Food ====
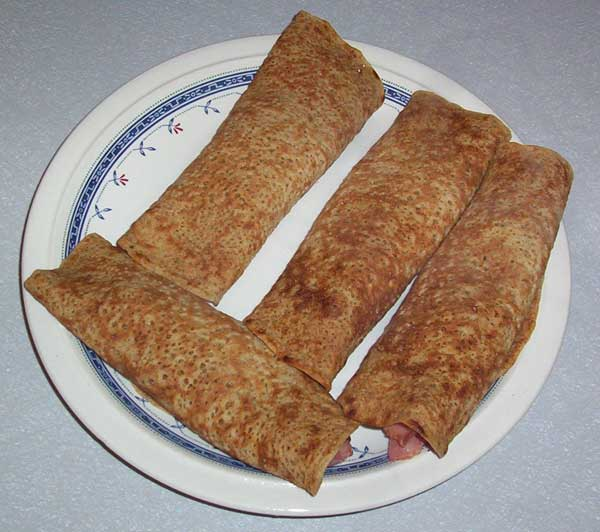
A Staffordshire oatcake

The Staffordshire oatcake is a much-loved local culinary speciality; it is very different from the Scottish version and is traditionally made in corner-shop style oatcake bakeries. They remain popular although are no longer the cheap alternative to bread. Oatcakes can be eaten cold or hot with any sweet or savoury fillings. Lobby, a stew not unlike Lancashire hotpot, is still made by local people.

==== Stoke Pride ====
Stoke Pride is the city's annual pride march that has been running since 2005, although it was not officially called Stoke Pride until 2008. It is a celebration of the city's LGBT community and attracts visitors from many different areas across the country. Originally held in Hanley, the event was held at Northwood Park until 2016 and has since moved to Hanley Park in 2017 attracting over 7,000 attendants, six times the amount of the previous year. It continued in 2018 with increased attendance and in 2019. It was due to continue in 2020, on 20 June, but was postponed because of the COVID-19 pandemic.

=== Science ===
Oliver Lodge (1851–1940) was a British physicist and writer involved in the development of, and holder of key patents for, radio. He was born in Penkhull. William Astbury (1898–1962) was an English physicist and molecular biologist who made pioneering X-ray diffraction studies of biological molecules. He was born in Longton. Jessie MacWilliams (1917–1990) was a mathematician who worked on coding theory and is known for the MacWilliams identities. John L. Jinks (1929–1987) was a geneticist who worked on cytoplasmic inheritance and quantitative genetics. David J. C. MacKay (1967–2016) was a physicist and mathematician known for his work on Bayesian inference and popular writings on climate change. Dan Hughes (1979–2025) was the founder of Radix DLT and the inventor of its crypto technology.

== Notable people ==
Stoke has been the birthplace of many actors and entertainers, including:

- Adrian Rawlins (born 1958), actor
- Bruno Brookes (born 1959), radio presenter and businessman
- Anthea Turner (born 1960), TV presenter
- Neil Morrissey (born 1962), actor
- Nick Hancock (born 1962), TV presenter
- Hugh Dancy (born 1975), actor
- Dominic Burgess (born 1982), actor
- Rachel Shenton (born 1987), actress.
- Robbie Williams is the most famous pop star to hail from the city. Many of his songs refer to Stoke-on-Trent, either directly or indirectly. These include "It's Only Us", "Burslem Normals", "The 80s" and the spoken introduction to his duet with Jonathan Wilkes of the song "Me and My Shadow". a new housing estate in Middleport were named after Williams' hit songs: Supreme Street, Candy Lane and Angels Way.
- Saul Hudson, the lead guitarist for Guns N' Roses better known by his stage name "Slash", was raised in Stoke-on-Trent. His father, Anthony Hudson, was from the area, and he spent a few of his early childhood years living in the city before moving to his mother's native United States in 1970. He did not meet many of the British side of his family until 1992 when Guns N' Roses played Wembley Stadium as part of the Freddie Mercury Tribute Concert. Slash has recalled in interviews and his autobiography that his Stoke relatives drank all of the band's considerable rider:

"I witnessed one of my uncles, my cousin, and my grandfather, on his very first trip to London from Stoke, down every drop of liquor in our dressing room. Consumed in full, our booze rider in those days would have killed anyone but us."

== Media ==
=== Newspaper ===
- The Sentinel daily local newspaper

=== Radio ===
- BBC Radio Stoke/94.6: the third BBC local radio station to begin broadcasting
- Hits Radio Staffordshire & Cheshire/102.6: national commercial radio
- Greatest Hits Radio Staffordshire & Cheshire: national commercial radio
- Blue Sky Radio : local commercial radio
- 6 Towns Radio: local community radio
- Cross Rhythms City Radio/101.8: religious hit music

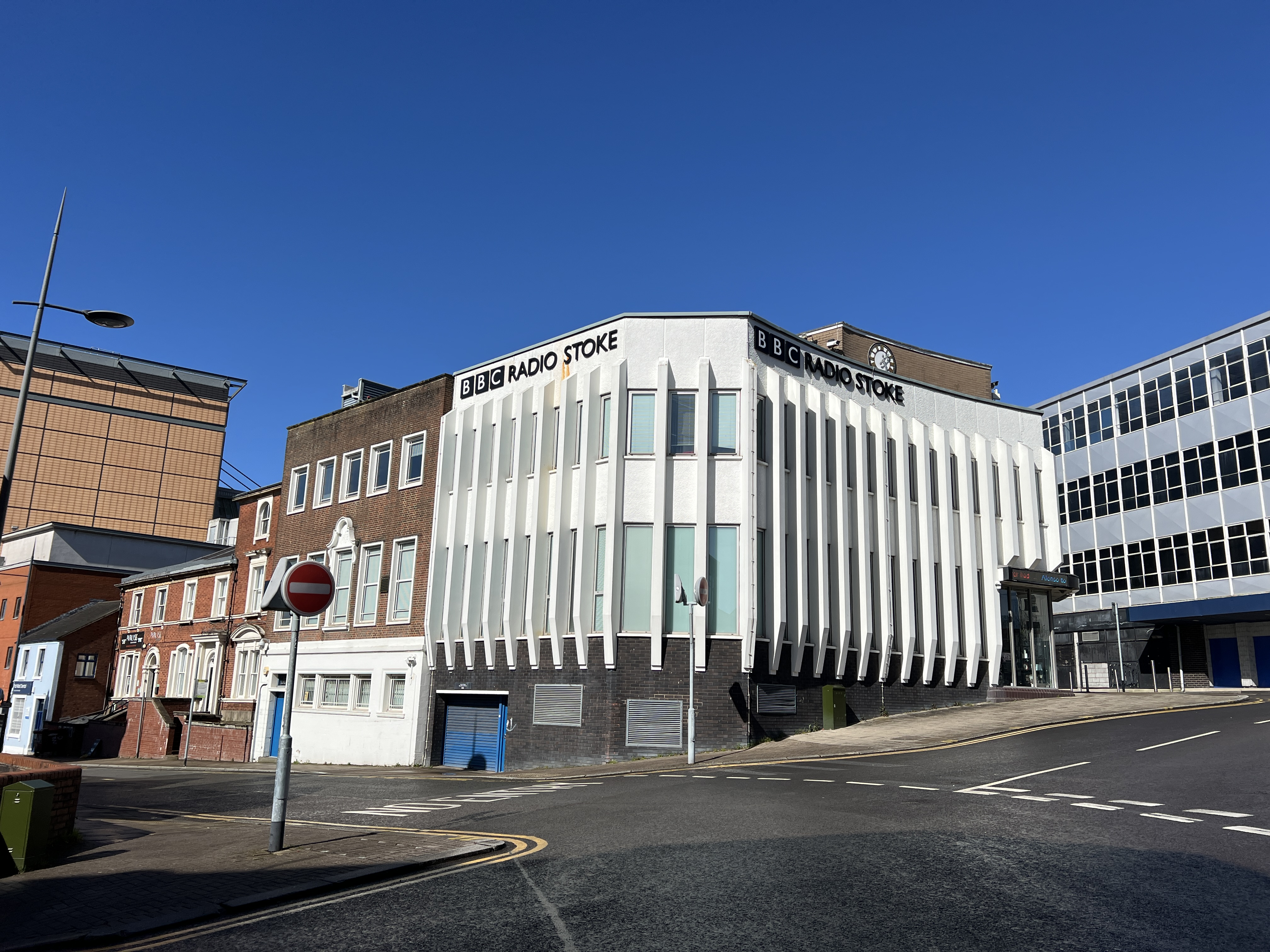
BBC Radio Stoke Offices

=== Television ===
Local news and television programmes are provided by BBC West Midlands and ITV Central. Television signals are received from the Sutton Coldfield TV transmitter and the Fenton relay transmitter.

The city is to be part of the second wave of UK cities to get its local TV station.

== Dialect ==
The Potteries has a distinctive local dialect. It contains many non-standard words, e.g. nesh meaning "soft, tender or to easily get cold", and slat meaning "to throw". The best-known word is duck, which is used as a greeting to either men or women. It is believed to be derived from the Saxon word ducas, used to indicate respect. In Middle English this became duc or duk, which denotes a leader. It became the title Duke and the Old French word duché, which indicates the territory ruled by a Duke.

Another common variation on the standard English dialect is the use of the word shug for sugar. This is usually used as a term of endearment when closing a sentence, as in "Ta Shug" (thank you, sugar).

A local cartoon strip called May un Mar Lady (Me and my Wife), published in the newspaper The Sentinel and written in Potteries dialect, first appeared on 8 July 1986 and ran for over 20 years. Since the death of cartoonist Dave Follows in 2003, the full twenty-year run (7,000) of May un Mar Lady strips have been republished in The Sentinel as May un Mar Lady Revisited.

Alan Povey's Owd Grandad Piggott stories, which have aired on BBC Radio Stoke for several years, are recited in the Potteries dialect by the author.

== International relations ==
Stoke is twinned with:

- East Liverpool, Columbiana County, Ohio, United States
- Erlangen, Bavaria, Germany, since 1989

== Freedom of the City ==
- List of Freemen of the City of Stoke-on-Trent.

== See also ==
- List of people from Stoke-on-Trent
- Listed buildings in Stoke-on-Trent
- Living Heritage City Trail, Stoke-on-Trent
- Stoke-on-Trent power station
