= List of schools in Stoke-on-Trent =

This is a list of schools in Stoke-on-Trent in the English county of Staffordshire.

== State-funded schools ==
=== Primary schools ===
- Abbey Hulton Primary School
- Alexandra Infants' School
- Alexandra Junior School
- Ash Green Primary Academy
- Ball Green Primary School
- Belgrave St Bartholomew's Academy
- Burnwood Community Primary School
- Carmountside Primary Academy
- Christ Church CE Primary Academy
- Co-op Academy Clarice Cliff
- Co-op Academy Grove
- Co-op Academy Hamilton
- Co-op Academy Northwood
- The Crescent Academy
- Eaton Park Academy
- Etruscan Primary School
- Forest Park Primary School
- Gladstone Primary Academy
- Glebe Academy
- Goldenhill Primary Academy
- Greenways Primary Academy
- Harpfield Primary Academy
- Heron Cross Primary School
- Hillside Primary School
- Holden Lane Primary School
- Jackfield Infant School
- Kingsland CE Academy
- Maple Court Academy
- The Meadows Primary Academy
- Mill Hill Primary Academy
- Milton Primary Academy
- Moorpark Junior School
- New Ford Academy
- Newstead Primary Academy
- Norton-le-Moors Primary Academy
- Oakhill Primary School
- Our Lady and St Benedict RC Academy
- Our Lady's RC Academy
- Packmoor Ormiston Academy
- Park Hall Academy
- Priory CE Academy
- St Augustine's RC Academy
- St George and St Martin's RC Academy
- St Gregory's RC Academy
- St John's CE Primary School
- St Joseph's RC Academy
- St Luke's CE Primary School
- St Maria Goretti RC Academy
- St Mark's CE Primary School
- St Mary's CE Primary School
- St Mary's RC Academy
- St Matthew's CE Academy
- St Nathaniel's Academy
- St Paul's CE Primary School
- St Peter's CE Academy
- St Peter's RC Academy
- St Teresa's RC Primary School
- St Thomas Aquinas RC Primary School
- St Wilfrid's RC Academy
- Sandford Hill Primary School
- Sandon Primary Academy
- Smallthorne Primary Academy
- Sneyd Academy
- Star Academy Sandyford
- Stoke Minster CE Primary Academy
- Summerbank Primary Academy
- Sutherland Primary Academy
- Waterside Primary School
- Weston Infant Academy
- Weston Junior Academy
- Whitfield Valley Primary Academy
- The Willows Primary School

=== Non-selective secondary schools ===
- Birches Head Academy
- Co-op Academy Stoke-on-Trent
- Discovery Academy
- Excel Academy
- Haywood Academy
- Ormiston Horizon Academy
- Ormiston Meridian Academy
- Ormiston Sir Stanley Matthews Academy
- St Margaret Ward Catholic Academy
- St Peter's Academy
- St Thomas More Catholic Academy
- Thistley Hough Academy
- Trentham Academy

=== Grammar schools ===
- St Joseph's College

=== Special and alternative schools ===
- Abbey Hill Academy
- Kemball School
- Merit Hospital School and Medical Pupil Referral Unit
- Portland School and Specialist College
- Watermill School

=== Further education ===
- City of Stoke-on-Trent Sixth Form College
- Stoke-on-Trent College

== Independent schools ==
=== Senior and all-through schools ===
- Excellence Girls Academy
- North Road Academy

=== Special and alternative schools ===
- Alpha Learning Staffordshire
- The Beechfield School
- Edison Pace School
- Emerge School
- Glebedale School
- Intuition Holistic Education
- Kinetic Academy
- The Oaks School
- Peak Education - Stoke
- Phoenix U16 Independent School
- Rowan House School
- Snow Hill School
- Sporting Stars Academy
- The Valiant School
- Want2Achieve The Academy
