= Berry Hill High School and Sports College =

Location
- Arbourfield Drive; Stoke-on-Trent, Staffordshire, ST2 9LR; England; 53°00′59″N 2°08′39″W

Information
- Type: Community school
- Established: September 1964
- Closed: August 2011
- Local authority: Stoke-on-Trent
- Department for Education URN: 124387 Tables
- Ofsted: Reports
- Gender: Coeducational
- Age: 11 to 16
- Colours: Blue & Gold
- Website: www.berryhill.stoke.sch.uk

Berry Hill High School and Sports College was a mixed, secondary school in Berry Hill, Stoke-on-Trent, one of the two predecessors to St Peter's Academy.

With almost 900 students in 2005, merger proposals saw student numbers drop to around 500 by 2010. This period also saw a high turnover of staff. The school closed in summer 2011, and was demolished in 2015.

== Admissions ==
The school taught around 500 pupils, all between the ages of 11 and 16; broken up into Key Stage 3 (Years 7, 8 and 9), and Key Stage 4 (Years 10 and 11). Most pupils were White British and qualified for free school meals, mostly coming from 'hard pressed families'.

The majority of its students lived in the surrounding areas, and the suburbs of Bentilee, Bucknall, and Hanley. It was located by the Berryhill Fields.

== History ==
The school opened in September 1964, originally with sixteen staff members and 196 pupils.

Mr Stephen Daniels was appointed as Headteacher in June 1998. A November 1999 OFTED inspection noted that the school had a below average to well below average performance, though this performance was rated as average to above average compared with similar schools. The school was generally satisfactory, with good behaviour, leadership and ethos, and unsatisfactory attendance. The school's expenditure was £2,032,741 for 1999, an average spending of £2,181 on each pupil.

Around 2003 Mr Daniels left the school to become headteacher of Ilkeston Grammar School, and was replaced by Ruth Poppleton.

In September 2004 the school was awarded Sports College status.

In October 2005 - the school's first inspection for six years - the school was graded as 'Satisfactory'.

In January 2007 the school received national attention when then-Headteacher Ruth Poppleton excluded eleven pupils who walked out in protest amid complaints over poor education standards. Protesters complained that as much as 75% of teachers were employed on a supply basis.

In September 2008 another Ofsted inspection also handed out a Satisfactory grade. In December 2008, Poppleton left the school, and Deputy Head Mark Ranford was appointed Headteacher. Since that time Ofsted declared that they had found "satisfactory progress in making improvements and inadequate progress in demonstrating a better capacity for sustained improvement". The October 2009 report acknowledged Ranford had "worked extremely hard... in difficult circumstances".

=== Merger ===
Proposals were made for the school to merge with St Peter's, Mitchell, James Brindley, Edensor, Trentham, Blurton and Brownhills to form five academies; a plan supported by then-Mayor Mark Meredith. The school would merge with Mitchell and Edensor and be replaced by a new academy at Park Hall. Some parents were outraged by the decision, insisting that Park Hall was too far a distance. The Berry Hill area is a difficult site to build upon, with ground instability due to old mines, and the City Council insisted upon the Park Hall plan. The building projects were delayed after protests by parents at Trentham High, and planning permission issues, despite the City Council's determination to move ahead with the plans.

"We want to obviously raise awareness... about the need for there to be a school at the heart of our communities of Bentilee, Berry Hill and Eaton Park. What both schools would like and their governing bodies is the two schools to be merged into a new school on the Mitchell site."

— In February 2008, then-Headteacher Ruth Poppleton stated what the wish of the two schools was in regards to future merger developments.

A new merger plan would see the school merge with St Peter's CofE (A) High School on the site of the old Stoke-on-Trent Sixth Form College to create a new faith school. These plans also met with strong opposition from staff, pupils and parents.

By March 2010, merger plans are still under discussion. By then the discussed location was Adderley Green, as opposed to Park Hall. One Ofsted report noted that "uncertainty about the school’s future has led to a rapid reduction in pupil numbers." In five years the school's student numbers reduced from around 900 to just over 500; almost a 50% reduction.

The school closed in summer 2011, though as St Peters Academy was as yet to be built, the site continued to welcome schoolchildren for the 2011–12 academic year. It was demolished in 2015.

== Academic standards ==
According to Ofsted's October 2009 report, 31% of students achieved A*to C grades in English and mathematics, below the national average. The report showed that academic standards were improving at the school.

=== Performance table ===
Year	% of 5 GCSE A*-C	% of 5 GCSE A*-C incl. Maths & English	City Ranking (of 17)
1997	21	-	-
1998	28	-	-
1999	31	-	-
2000	24	-	-
2001	27	-	-
2002	25	-	14
2003	45	-	10
2004	35	18	12
2005	44	21	7
2006	36	15	16
2007	69	18	17
2008	51	13	17
2009	-	23	16
2010	-	43	10
2011	-	36	14

Note
From 2006 onwards rankings were based on percentage of students achieving five GCSE grades A*-C including Maths & English. Before then rankings were based purely on percentage of students achieving five GCSE grades A*-C. In 2011 the ranking is out of 16.

== Feeder Schools ==
The main feeder school was Eaton Park Primary School, located on the opposite side of the street from Berry Hill High. Other feeder schools included Marychurch C of E Primary School in Bucknall and St Luke's C of E Primary School in Hanley.

The school itself was a feeder of Stoke-on-Trent College and the City of Stoke-on-Trent Sixth Form College.

== Notable alumni and staff ==
- John Caudwell, student, billionaire businessman
- Ray Williams, Mathematics teacher, former Port Vale footballer and Northwich Victoria manager

== See also ==
- List of schools in Stoke-on-Trent
