= Abbey Hill (disambiguation) =

Abbey Hill is a civil parish in Milton Keynes, Buckinghamshire, England.

Abbey Hill may also refer to several other places in the United Kingdom:

- Abbey Hill, Somerset, a hamlet in the parish of Curland
- Abbey Hill Academy, Stoke-on-Trent, Staffordshire
- Abbey Hill, now Abbeyhill, district of Edinburgh
  - Abbeyhill railway station
  - Abbeyhill Junction, a railway junction
- Abbey Hills, an area in Oldham, Greater Manchester

== See also ==
- Abby Hill, American painter
- Abigail Masham, Baroness Masham, born Abigail Hill
