= Kelsall (disambiguation) =

Kelsall is a village in Cheshire, England. Kelsall may also refer to:

- Kelsall (name), a list of people with the surname
- Kelsall River, a North American river that runs through Alaska, Yukon, and British Columbia
