= Kelsall (name) =

Kelsall is a surname, possibly derived from the English village of the same name. Notable people with the surname include:

- Conner Kelsall (born 1999), English professional boxer
- Freda Kelsall (born 1938), an English scriptwriter, theatre director and former teacher
- Frederick Kelsall (1906–1931), an English rugby league player
- John Kelsall (1947–1986), an English composer
- Karen Kelsall (born 1962), a Canadian gymnast, dancer, and chiropractor
- Moultrie Kelsall (1901–1980), a Scottish actor
- Phil Kelsall (born 1956), an English organist
- Robert Kelsall (born 1946), an English cricketer
- Sam Kelsall (born 1993), an English cricketer
- Thomas Forbes Kelsall (1799–1872), an English lawyer and literary figure
