= Birches Head =

Area of Stoke-on-Trent, Staffordshire, England

Coordinates: 53.034200°N 2.163300°W

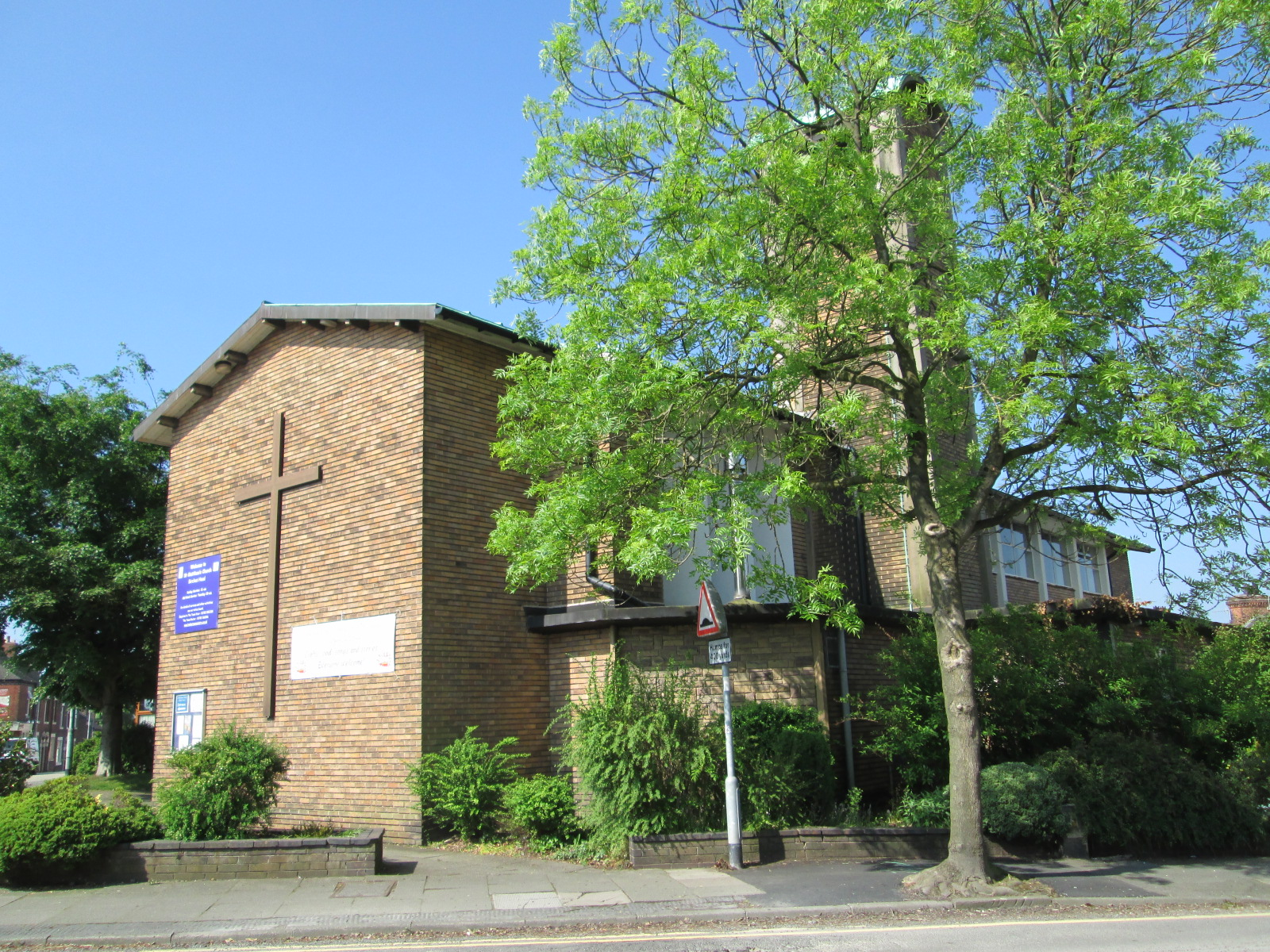
- St Matthew's Church, Birches Head

- Location within Staffordshire
- Population: 11,322 (2011. Ward. Birches Head and Central Forest Park)
- OS grid reference: SJ8948
- Unitary authority: Stoke-on-Trent
- Ceremonial county: Staffordshire
- Region: West Midlands
- Country: England
- Sovereign state: United Kingdom
- Post town: STOKE-ON-TRENT
- Postcode district: ST1
- Dialling code: 01782
- Police: Staffordshire
- Fire: Staffordshire
- Ambulance: West Midlands
- UK Parliament: Stoke-on-Trent Central

Birches Head is an area of Stoke-on-Trent, Staffordshire, England.

Formerly Birches Head Farm, the area has had modern housing built on it. The local secondary school is Birches Head Academy. The Caldon Canal runs through the area, which is easily accessible from the city centre, with main roads such as the A5009, A5008 and A5272. Birches Head Road runs from the junction of Chell Street and Hulton Street, at the west, to Leek Road at the east. It joins Leek Road at the site of Hulton Abbey. Prior to 1950, the road from St Matthew's Church, at the highest point of the village, down to Chell Street was called Leonard Road. The central part of the road in the village was Birches Head Road, and the final part running down to Leek Road, which was only a wide dirt track, was known as Birches Head Lane.

== Potter's House Church ==
Potter's House Church is on the site of the former high school, now known as The Bridge Centre. It has a secondary location at Longton Central Hall.
