= Stoke-on-Trent Combined Court Centre =

Judicial building in Stoke-on-Trent, England

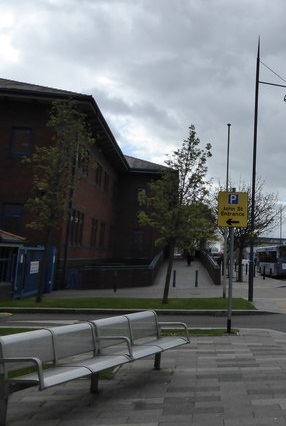
- Entrance to the Stoke-on-Trent Combined Court Centre

- Shown in Staffordshire
- 53.0220°N 2.1759°W
- Location: Bethesda Street, Hanley

History
- Built: 1991

Site notes
- Architect: Property Services Agency
- Architectural style: Modernist style

The Stoke-on-Trent Combined Court Centre is a Crown Court venue, which deals with criminal cases, as well as a County Court, which deals with civil cases, in Bethesda Street, Hanley, England.

== History ==
Until the early 1990s, criminal court hearings were held in the Town Hall in Albion Square, Hanley. However, as the number of court cases in the Stoke-on-Trent area grew, it became necessary to commission a more modern courthouse. The site selected by the Lord Chancellor's Department, on the east side of Bethesda Street, had accommodated a series of rows of terraced housing (John Street, Vine Street and Mollart Street) before the area was cleared.

The new building was designed by the Property Services Agency in the Modernist style, built in red brick at a cost of £9.5 million, and was officially opened by the Lord Chief Justice, Lord Lane, on 5 December 1991. The design involved an asymmetrical main frontage of 14 bays facing onto Bethesda Street. The central section of eight bays, which was slightly projected forward, featured a portico formed by four columns supporting a flat canopy. On the first floor, above the canopy, there were three round headed windows surmounted by a pediment containing a Royal coat of arms. The left hand section of four bays, the outer bays in the central section, and the right hand section of two bays, were all fenestrated with single, double or triple casement windows on both floors. Internally, the building was laid out to accommodate six courtrooms.

Notable cases included the trial and conviction of the Irish gangster, Thomas Kavanagh, in September 2019, on firearms charges, and the trial and conviction of Jordan Birch, in November 2019, on a charge of dangerous driving in connection with the death of the rapper, Cadet.
