= Henry Heath =

Henry Heath may refer to:

- Henry Heath (British Army officer) (1860–1915), First World War commander
- Henry Heath (martyr) (1599–1643), Franciscan friar
- Henry Heath (Mormon pioneer) (1828–1908), Mormon pioneer and frontier lawman

== See also ==
- Henry Heth (1825–1899), Confederate general
