= Meir, Staffordshire =

Suburb of Stoke-on-Trent, England

Coordinates: 52.9779°N 2.1051°W

Meir
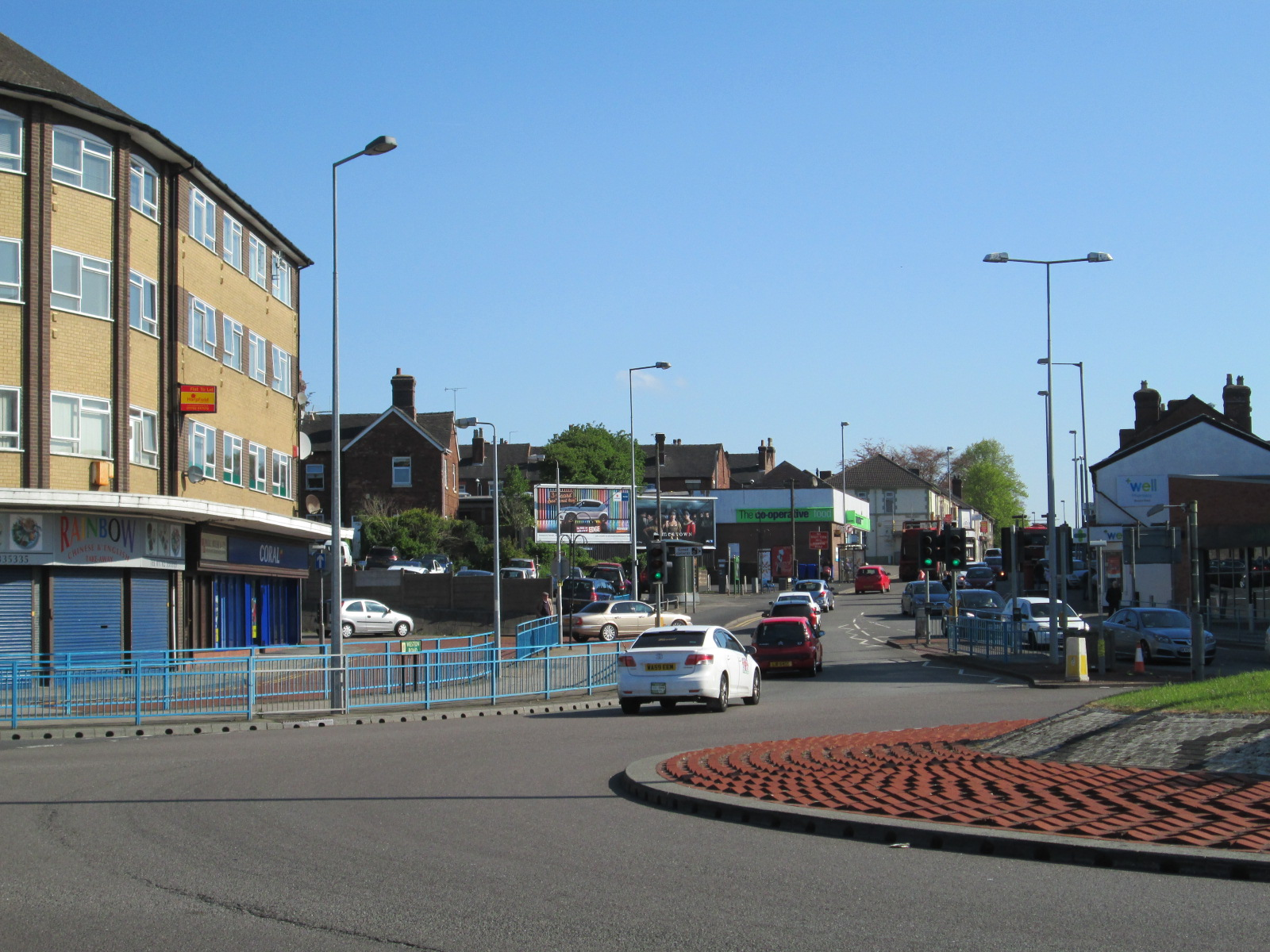
- The A520 leading north, across the roundabout at Meir

- Location within Staffordshire
- OS grid reference: SJ927427
- Unitary authority: Stoke-on-Trent
- Ceremonial county: Staffordshire
- Region: West Midlands
- Country: England
- Sovereign state: United Kingdom
- Post town: Stoke-on-Trent
- Postcode district: ST3
- Dialling code: 01782
- Police: Staffordshire
- Fire: Staffordshire
- Ambulance: West Midlands
- UK Parliament: Stoke-on-Trent South

Meir is a suburb in Stoke-on-Trent, Staffordshire situated between Lightwood and Longton. Meir Park estate extends from Meir uphill to the Meir Heath and Rough Close village hall, located in Meir Heath.

== Meir Aerodrome ==
Meir Aerodrome closed in the early 1970s and the site has now become the Meir Park housing estate. The earlier parts have mainly aviation-associated street names. The last official flight was on 16 August 1973 when Fred Holdcroft flew a Piper Tri-Pacer carrying a Sentinel journalist to Manchester. The last unofficial flight "a year or two" later by Eric Clutton was in a home-made folding machine called FRED (Flying Runabout Experimental Design) which the pilot towed home behind his car. The light planes used to be parked on the grass alongside the A50 road, opposite the Airport Garage, which remains. Staffordshire Potteries had a factory (now demolished) beside the aerodrome.

== Schools ==
- Abbey Hill Academy
- Co-op Academy Florence MacWilliams
- Crescent Academy
- Meir Heath Primary Academy
- Ormiston Meridian Academy
- St Augustine's R.C. Primary School
- Sandon Primary Academy

== Transport ==
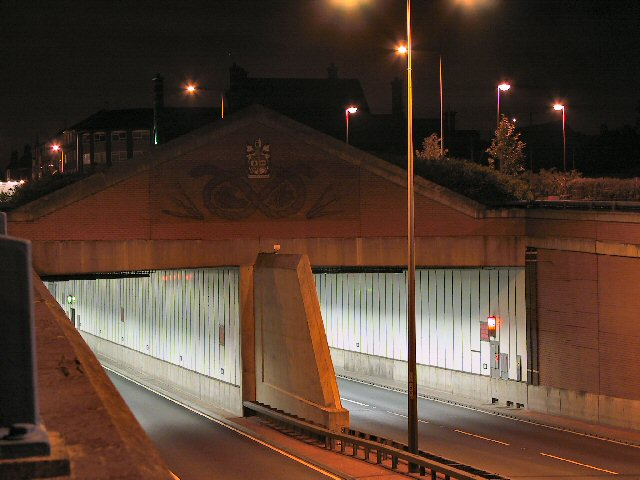
Entrance to the tunnel under the roundabout

Meir is situated along the A50. At the centre sits the junction with the A520. Once a notorious traffic jam site, a tunnel was built in 1997 to take the A50 underneath.

Meir was served by a railway station from 1894 to 1966.

== Nearest places ==
- Barlaston
- Blythe Bridge
- Lightwood
- Longton
- Trentham
