= Joseph Glass (potter) =

- Occupation: Potter

Joseph Glass (fl. 1670-1703 at least) was a potter, working in Hanley, in the Staffordshire Potteries, England. He worked in slipware, and is one of the first potters known to have signed and dated his work.

His name was included in a 1776 list drawn up by Josiah Wedgwood "having examined some of the oldest men in the pottery here [...] who knew personally the masters in the pottery..." and published in his A History of the Adams Family of North Staffordshire.

Glass' work, which has been compared to that of Thomas Toft, is in a number of public collections, including a posset pot (inscribed "Joseph Glass S.V. H.G.") in the British Museum, and a cradle, dated 1703, in the J. W. L. Glaisher collection at the Fitzwilliam Museum.

In March 2020, a jug with his signature, and the date 1701, was shown on the BBC Television programme Antiques Roadshow. It was valued at £20,000 by John Sandon.
