= Eric Clutton =

Eric Clutton was an aircraft and aero-engine designer most noted for his FRED (Flying Runabout Experimental Design), a pioneering British homebuilt aircraft of the 1960s. During the 1970s, he worked on developing a geared version of the Volkswagen air-cooled engine for aircraft use, and the Clutton-Tabenor EC.2 (or "Easy Too"), a homebuilt sportsplane intended to showcase the potential of the new engine.

In the United States, he built a business out of designing model aircraft for radio control, and a line of diesel engines to power them under the name "Doctor Diesel", continuing his line of experimental model designs since his childhood in the UK.
