= Abbey Hills =

Coordinates: 53.530°N 2.087°W

- Location within Greater Manchester
- OS grid reference: SD942037
- Metropolitan borough: Oldham
- Metropolitan county: Greater Manchester
- Region: North West
- Country: England
- Sovereign state: United Kingdom
- Post town: OLDHAM
- Postcode district: OL8
- Dialling code: 0161
- Police: Greater Manchester
- Fire: Greater Manchester
- Ambulance: North West
- UK Parliament: Oldham East and Saddleworth

Abbey Hills (archaically Wabbow Hills) is an area of Oldham in Greater Manchester. It is contiguous with Glodwick and Alt.

Lying on the eastern border of the historic Oldham township, Abbey Hills was the location of a large housing estate, the Abbey Hills Estate. It was built in the 1930s but was largely demolished during the late 1980s.

== History ==
Until the early part of the 20th century the area around Abbey Hills was moorland and farmland. At this time it was still known by its archaic name, Wabbow Hills, centred around a farmstead, Wabbow Hills Farm.

Other than minor development in the vicinity of Pitses, there was little change in the area until well into the 20th century. By 1922 the new Abbey Hills Road from Glodwick had reached a point just beyond its junction with the also new Manor Road, with Pitses and Alt still served by the old road running between the Moorhey area of Oldham and the industrial settlement of Park Bridge.

The first major change to the area came in the 1930s with the building by Oldham Borough Council of the Abbey Hills Estate, laid out on Garden City principles on land north and south of Abbey Hills Road, which was then extended to meet Lees New Road, completing the modern–day route to Ashton.

The estate was built right–up to what was then the administrative edge of the Borough of Oldham. Construction of the estate and the extension of Abbey Hills Road necessitated the demolition of Abbey Hills House (formerly Wabbow Hills). The Manor Inn, built by the Oldham Brewery in 1936–7, occupies a part of its site.

The housing of the Abbey Hills Estate was built to a lower standard than earlier Council housing, add to which it was unpopular due to its isolated location. Families left and the estate became run–down and neglected. Improvements were carried out between 1976 and 1978, though in 1988 nearly all of the 1930s houses south of Abbey Hills Road were demolished (the only survivals are those fronting the main road). The land was turned over to developers and new houses built in their stead, with the surviving lengths of road renamed.

== Transport ==
Bee Network provides service 425 to Holts Village and to Fitton Hill via Glodwick and Oldham.
