= St John Fisher Catholic College =

Location
- Ashfields New Road; Newcastle-under-Lyme; Staffordshire, ST5 2SJ; England
- Coordinates: 53.0159°N 2.23546°W

Information
- Type: Academy
- Religious affiliation: Roman Catholic
- Local authority: Staffordshire
- Department for Education URN: 140802 Tables
- Ofsted: Reports
- Gender: Mixed
- Age: 11 to 18
- Enrolment: 1093 as of June 2022 Of which 148 on roll in the sixth form
- Website: http://www.saintjohnfishercc.co.uk/

St John Fisher Catholic College is a mixed secondary school and sixth form located in Newcastle-under-Lyme in the English county of Staffordshire. The school is named after Saint John Fisher, a Roman Catholic bishop and theologian who was executed by order of Henry VIII during the English Reformation The school was originally named after the Blessed Thomas Maxfield and changed to St John Fisher in 1980.

Previously a voluntary aided school administered by the Roman Catholic Archdiocese of Birmingham and Staffordshire County Council, St John Fisher Catholic College converted to academy status in April 2014. The school is now part of Christ the King Catholic Collegiate, a Multi Academy Company, administered by the Archdiocese of Birmingham.

St John Fisher Catholic College offers GCSEs as well as BTECS as programmes of study for pupils, while students in the sixth form have the option to study from a range of A-levels and BTECs. The sixth form provision is offered as the Trinity Sixth Form, a collaboration between St John Fisher Catholic College, St Margaret Ward Catholic Academy, and St Thomas More Catholic Academy.
