= Clutton-Tabenor FRED =

British homebuilt aircraft

FRED
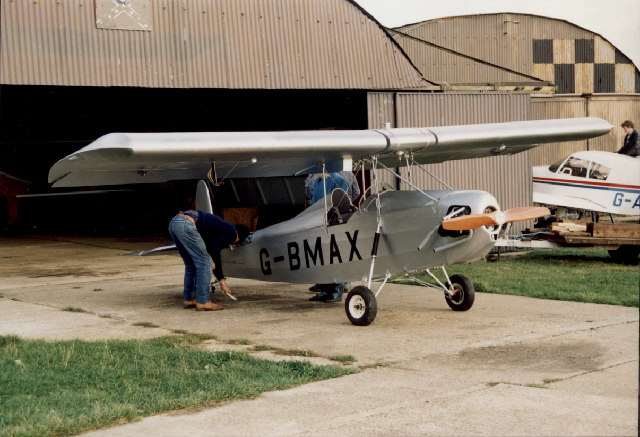
- Being prepared for flight at Andrewsfield Airport, Essex, 1989

General information
- Type: Homebuilt monoplane
- Manufacturer: Clutton-Tabenor
- Designer: Eric Clutton
- Number built: about 30-40

History
- First flight: 1963

The Clutton-Tabenor FRED is a British homebuilt aircraft design introduced in 1963.

== Design and development ==
The prototype FRED (Flying Runabout Experimental Design) was designed and built by E.C. Clutton and E.W. Sherry between 1957 and 1963. The aircraft, registered G-ASZY, first flew at Meir aerodrome, Stoke-on-Trent on 3 November 1963. It was a single-seat wood and fabric parasol monoplane powered originally by a Triumph 5T motorcycle engine. By 1968 it was flying with a converted Volkswagen engine. The Continental A-65 65 hp (48 kW) four-stroke powerplant has also been used. The plans were made available to allow the aircraft to be homebuilt and thirty to forty examples have been built around the world.

== Variants ==
FRED Series 1
Prototype, one built.
FRED Series 2
Homebuilt version sold in the form of plans.
FRED Series 3
Improved homebuilt version with 65 hp (48 kW) Continental A65 engine. First flight December 1982.

== Specifications (FRED Series 2) ==
Data from Jane's All the World's Aircraft 1971–72

General characteristics

- Crew: 1
- Length: 17 ft 0 in (5.18 m)
- Wingspan: 22 ft 6 in (6.86 m)
- Height: 6 ft 0 in (1.83 m)
- Wing area: 110 sq ft (10 m^{2})
- Aspect ratio: 4.4:1
- Airfoil: Göttingen 535
- Empty weight: 533 lb (242 kg)
- Gross weight: 773 lb (351 kg)
- Fuel capacity: 7.5 imp gal (9.0 US gal; 34 L)
- Powerplant: 1 × converted 1500 cc Volkswagen engine 4-cylinder air-cooled horizontally opposed piston engine, 66 hp (49 kW)

Performance

- Maximum speed: 75 mph (121 km/h, 65 kn)
- Cruise speed: 63 mph (101 km/h, 55 kn)
- Stall speed: 40 mph (64 km/h, 35 kn) (approx)
- Range: 200 mi (320 km, 170 nmi)
