= Jone o Grinfilt =

Jone o Grinfilt is a poem in the Oldham dialect of English. It was written by a man named Joseph Lees from the Glodwick area of the town in 1805. "Grinfilt" is a dialect pronunciation of Greenfield, a village in the neighbouring parish of Saddleworth. The main character believes that the historic county boundary between Lancashire and Yorkshire is a boundary between nations, and he prepares to set off to Oldham in the belief that this is where the French live. At the time of writing, the Napoleonic Wars were under way and Jone is eager to take part. The poem was very popular, and was widely imitated elsewhere in England.

The poem circulated in the form of broadsides and is known to have been sung for King George III. Two broadside ballads naming Jone o Grinfilt in their titles are reproduced by Martha Vicinus in Broadsides of the Industrial North, 1975. One is this poem and the other is better known as "Th' Owdham Wayver" or "The Poor Cotton Weaver". They were probably printed in the mid 19th century; the poem was also printed in John Harland's Ballads and Songs of Lancashire (three editions: 1865, 1875 and 1882).

== Full text ==
Says Jone to his woife on a whot summers day,
"Awm resolvt i Grinfilt no lunger to stay;
For awll goo to Owdham os fast os aw can,
So fare thee weel Grinfilt, an fare thee weel Nan;
For a sodger awll be, an brave Owdham awll see,
An awll hae a battle wi th French."

"Dear Jone," said eawr Nan, un hoo bitterly cried,
"Wilt be one o th foote, or theaw means for t ride?"
"Ods eawns! wench awll ride oather ass or a mule,
Ere awll keawr i Grinfilt os black os th owd dule
Booath clemmin, un starvin, un never a fardin,
It ud welly drive ony mon mad."

"Ay, Jone, sin we coom i Grinfilt for t dwell,
Weyn had mony a bare meal, aw con vara weel tell."
"Bare meal, ecod! ay, that aw vara weel know,
Theres bin two days this wick ot weyn had nowt at o;
Awm vara near sided, afore awll abide it,
Awll feight oather Spanish or French."

Then says my Noant Margit, "Ah! Jone, theawrt so whot,
Awd neer go to Owdham, boh I England awd stop."
"It matters nowt, Madge, for to Owdham awll goo,
Awst neer clem to deeoth, boh sumbry shall know:
Furst Frenchmon aw find, awll tell him meh mind,
Un if hell naw feight, he shall run."

Then deawn th broo aw coom, for weh livent at top,
Aw thowt awd raich Owdham ere ever aw stop;
Ecod! heaw they staret when aw getten to th Mumps,
Meh owd hat i my hont, unmeh clogs full o stumps;
Boh aw soon towd um, awre gooin to Owdham
Un awd hae a battle wi th French.

Aw kept eendway thro th lone, un to Owdham aw went,
Aw axd a recruit if theyd made up their keawnt?
"Nowe, nowe, honest lad" (for he tawked like a king),
"Goo iw meh thro th street, un thee aw will bring
Wheere, if theawrt willin, theaw may hae a shillin."
Ecod! aw thowt this wur rare news.

He browt meh to th pleck, where they measurn their height,
Un if they bin th height they sen nowt abeawt weight;
Aw ratche meh un stretchd meh, un never did flinch:
Says th mon, "Aw believe theawrt meh lad to an inch."
Aw thowt thisll do; awst hae guineas enoo.
Ecod! Owdham, brave Owdham for me.

So fare thee weel, Grinfilt, a soger awm made:
Awve getten new shoon, un a rare nice cockade;
Awll feight for Owd Englond os hard os aw con,
Oather French, Dutch, or Spanish, to me its o one;
Awll mak em to stare, like a new started hare,
Un awll tell em fro Owdham aw coom.

== Standardization ==
Says John to his wife on a hot summer's day,
"I'm resolved in Greenfield no longer to stay;
For I'll go to Oldham as fast as I can,
So fare thee well Greenfield, and fare thee well Nan;
For a soldier I'll be, and brave Oldham I'll see,
And I'll have a battle with the French."

"Dear John," said our Nan, and she bitterly cried,
"Wilt thou be one of the Foot, or thou meanst for to ride?"
"God's wounds! Wench I'll ride either ass or a mule,
Ere I'll cower in Greenfield as black as th' old devil
Both freezing and starving, and never a farthing,
It would really drive any man mad."

"Aye, John, since we came to Greenfield for to dwell,
We've had many a bare meal, I can very well tell."
"Bare meal, egad! Aye, that I very well know,
There's been two days this week when we've had nothing at all;
I'm almost decided, before I'll abide it,
I'll fight either Spanish or French."

Then says my Aunt Margaret, "Ah! John, thou'rt so hot,
I'd never go to Oldham, but in England I'd stop."
"It matters not, Madge, for to Oldham I'll go,
I'm nearly starved to death, but somebody shall know:
First Frenchman I find, I'll tell him my mind,
And if he'll not fight, he shall run."

Then down the brow I came, for we lived at the top,
I thought I'd reach Oldham ere ever I stop;
Egad! How they stared when I got to the Mumps,
My old hat in my hand, and my clogs full of stamps;
But I soon told them, I'm going to Oldham
And I'd have a battle with the French.

I kept straight on through the lane, and to Oldham I went,
I asked a recruit if they'd made up their count?
"Now, now, honest lad" (for he talked like a king),
"Go with me through the street, and thee I will bring
Where, if thou'rt willing, thou may have a shilling."
Egad! I thought this was remarkable news.

He brought me to the place, where they measure their height,
And if they are the height they say nothing about weight;
I reached and I stretched, and never did flinch:
Says the man, "I believe thou'rt my lad to an inch."
I thought this'll do; I'll have guineas enough.
Egad! Oldham, brave Oldham for me.

So fare thee well, Greenfield, a soldier I'm made:
I've got new shoes, and a very nice cockade;
I'll fight for Old England as hard as I can,
Either French, Dutch, or Spanish, to me it's all one;
I'll make them stare, like a new started hare,
And I'll tell them from Oldham I've come.

== See also ==
- Lancashire dialect and accent
- John Collier (caricaturist)
