= Clutton-Tabenor Easy Too =

Prototype homebuilt aircraft

Easy Too

General information
- Type: Sports plane
- Manufacturer: Eric Clutton
- Designer: Eric Clutton

The Clutton-Tabenor Easy Too (originally the E.C.2) was a small homebuilt aircraft under development in the United Kingdom in the late 1970s. It was intended to be a flying showcase for designer Eric Clutton's adaptation of the Volkswagen air-cooled engine as a geared aero-engine. The lines of the aircraft were influenced by the Percival Mew Gull racer of the 1930s, but it was to have retractable undercarriage. The wings were designed to be folded to allow the aircraft to be towed behind a car.

Work on the prototype was abandoned when Clutton emigrated to the United States and the Easy Too never flew.

== Specifications (as designed) ==
General characteristics

- Crew: One pilot
- Length: 16 ft 8 in (5.08 m)
- Wingspan: 23 ft 4 in (7.11 m)
- Height: 4 ft 6 in (1.37 m)
- Empty weight: 560 lb (254 kg)
- Gross weight: 800 lb (363 kg)
- Powerplant: 1 × Geared Volkswagen air-cooled engine , 65 hp (50 kW)

Performance

- Cruise speed: 115 mph (185 km/h, 100 kn)
- Range: 400 mi (644 km, 350 nmi)
