= Trentham Academy =

Location
- Allerton Road; Trentham; Stoke-on-Trent, Staffordshire, ST4 8PQ; England; 52.9718°N 2.1949°W

Information
- Type: Academy
- Motto: Aspire, Endeavour, Achieve
- Trust: City Learning Trust
- Department for Education URN: 144558 Tables
- Ofsted: Reports
- Principal: Emma Wagg
- Gender: Coeducational
- Age: 11 to 16
- Capacity: 750 (up to 800)
- Houses: Pioneer; Apollo; Voyager
- Website: clt.trentham.coop

Trentham Academy (formerly Trentham High School) is a coeducational secondary school located in the village of Trentham in Stoke-on-Trent, Staffordshire, England.

== History ==
The original school was built in 1952, with several extensions over the years.

In 2010 the school was updated through the BSF fund, remodelling the science laboratories, DT block and Main courtyard. The Labour funded BSF projects were riddled with errors, leaving long-term issues at the site.

In 2021 the school received a 'Good with outstanding' OFSTED, showing the betterment of the school under the former Headteacher.

In 2025 the stoke schools PFI contract ended, and was followed by several news articles on how PFI failed schools in the area.

In 2026, the school received an updated Ofsted inspection where inspectors commented that 'Pupils are well prepared for life after school both academically and pastorally' Ofsted Report February 2026

== Subjects ==
The school offers a range of subjects. Most are compulsory in years 7 and 8 and become optional in years 9, 10 and 11, when students will sit exams.

Subjects include:

- Science (physics, chemistry, biology and sex education)
- Mathematics
- Statistics
- English literature
- English language
- Religious education
- Physical education
- Performing arts
- Modern foreign languages (French and Spanish)
- History
- Health and social care
- Geography
- Design and technology
- Drama
- Dance
- Computing/ICT
- Business studies
- Hospitality and Catering
- Art
- Media studies
- Photography

== House system ==
Trentham Academy operates a house system involving all years. On admission to the school, each student is assigned to one of the three houses:

- Pioneer (Red)
- Voyager (Green)
- Apollo (Yellow)

House competitions include:

- Football
- Basketball
- Netball
- Sports day
- Talent shows (a variety of singing, dancing, comics, etc.)
- Point collecting (for excellence in subjects and attendance)

House captains are appointed towards the end of Year 10. The house captains are responsible for organising and preparing the teams for the competitions and often officiate at the events themselves. All students and staff are members of a house. Students at Trentham Academy are all placed into tutor groups by year group. A Progress Leader leads each year group.

== Feeder schools ==
- Ash Green Primary School
- Priory CE Academy

== Leavers destinations ==
Trentham does have a sixth form but most students progress their studies at local sixth forms and colleges. The main destinations include: City of Stoke-on-Trent Sixth Form College, Newcastle-under-Lyme College sixth form and local grammar school St Josephs Sixth Form.

On average students leave with 9 GCSEs.

== Alumni ==
Karl Henry (1998)

John Brayford (2003)

Sam Kelsall (2009)

Tom Taylor (2011)

James Taylor (2017)
