= City of Stoke-on-Trent Sixth Form College =

Further education college in Staffordshire, England

Location
- Leek Road; Stoke-on-Trent, Staffordshire, ST4 2RU; England; 53.0075°N 2.1758°W

Information
- Type: Further education college
- Motto: High Quality Education in a Caring Environment
- Established: 1970; 56 years ago
- Local authority: Stoke-on-Trent
- Trust: Potteries Educational Trust
- Department for Education URN: 130817 Tables
- Ofsted: Reports
- Chair of governors: Charles Freeman
- Principal: Dr Simon Fox
- Gender: Coeducational
- Age: 16 to 19
- Enrolment: approx. 1800
- Colours: Blue & White
- Telephone Number: 01782 848736
- Fax Number: 01782 747456
- Website: www.stokesfc.ac.uk

The City of Stoke-on-Trent Sixth Form College is a mixed sixth form college on Leek Road, Stoke-on-Trent. It opened its new building on Leek Road in September 2010 having previously been located on Victoria Road, Fenton. The college is also known as Stoke-on-Trent Sixth Form College, and – prior to its relocation – Fenton Sixth Form College.

== Admissions ==
The college specialises in educating years 12 and 13, where students can gain AS, A2 and BTEC qualifications. More than 95% of students are aged between 16 and 19. About 90% of students are of White British heritage, with a large minority being British Pakistanis. About 70% of students come from the city, with the rest journeying in from north Staffordshire.

The college requires a minimum of four GCSEs at A* to C grades, rather than the minimum five usually required.

== History ==
The college was established in 1970 on Victoria Road, Fenton; making it the first purpose-built sixth form college in the country. Next to it was the Fenton Manor Sports Complex. Originally build with a capacity of 700 students, it eventually came to teach more than double that figure.

The idea of a 'University Quarter' was first announced in 2004, and was developed for the next few years. A December 2004 report gave most teaching staff a grade of good or better. In November 2006 an Ofsted report gave the college a satisfactory grade, and gave a good or better teaching and learning in 72% of lessons. In late 2008 planning permission was given for the college to build a new campus on Leek Road, as part of a £1.5 billion regeneration project in north Staffordshire. The project was suspended in January 2009, and concerns were made if sufficient funds could be found. The site was handed over to developers in March 2009, just as an Ofsted report gave the college a satisfactory grade. In September 2010 the college officially moved to Leek Road, Stoke-on-Trent.

The college was named in July 2019 as a computing hub for the National Centre for Computing Education.

== Academic standards ==
The school competes with four other institutes in the city: St Joseph's College, St Margaret Ward Catholic Academy, St Thomas More Catholic Academy and Stoke-on-Trent College. Of these only Shelton based Stoke-on-Trent College is not attached to a school.

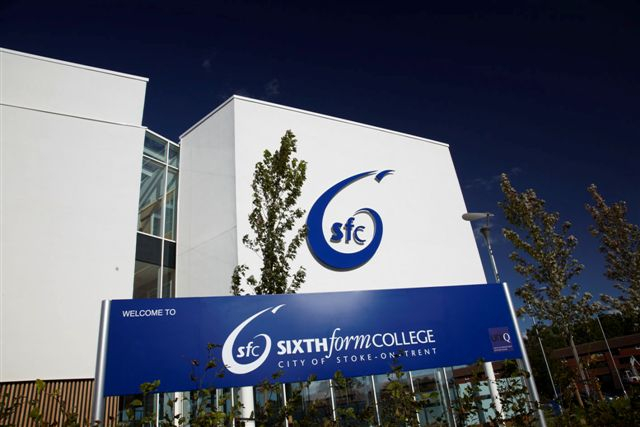
The front of the new college building.

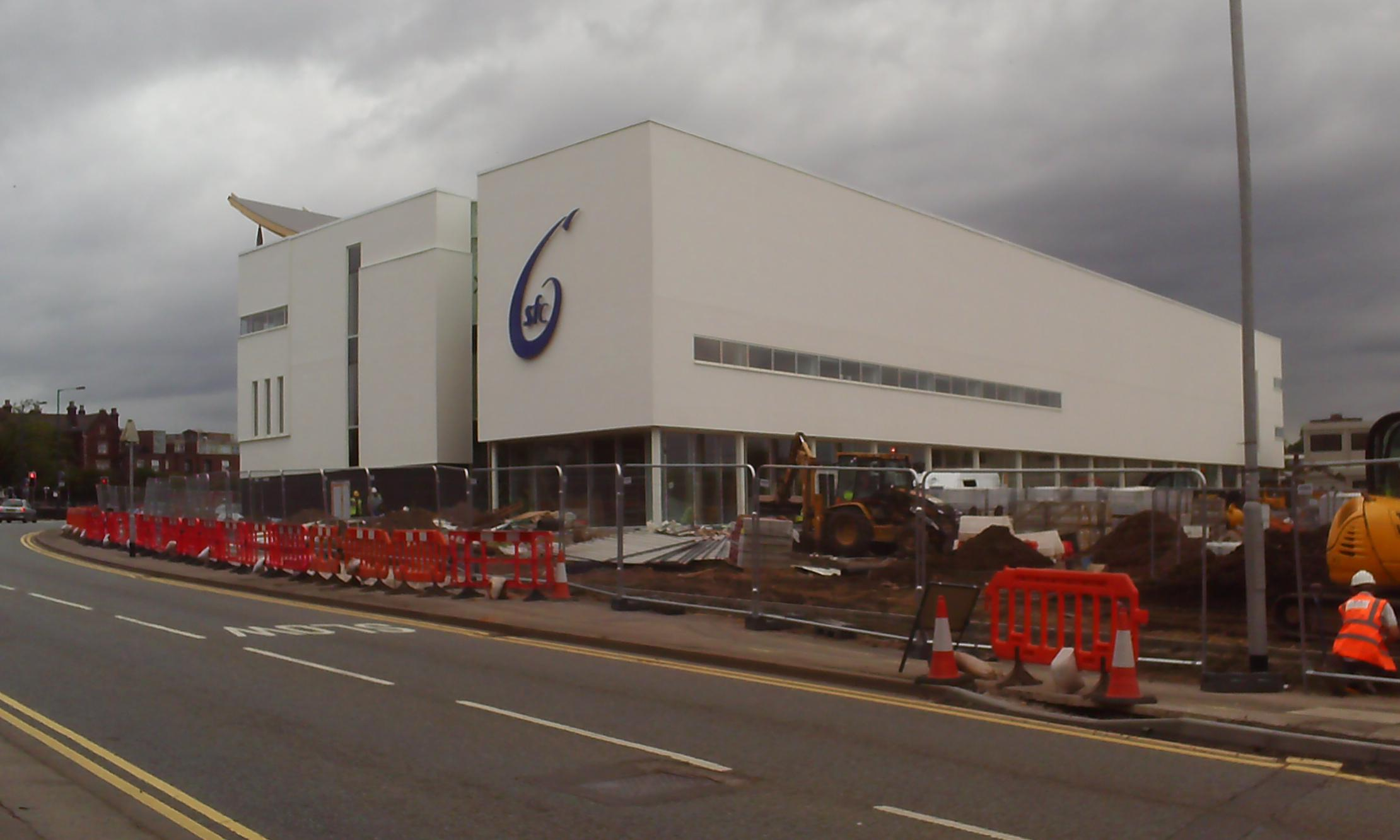
The new college in August 2010, as taken from Leek Road as final building work was being completed.

=== Performance table ===
Year	Average A/AS-level points per student	City Ranking (of 5)
2002	63.9	4
2003	245.6	4
2004	240.8	2
2005	241.6	2
2006	706.5	2
2007	661.2	3
2008	658.1	3
2009	628.9	4
2010	622.6	4
2011	629.7	4
2012	637.7	4
2013	643.4	3
2014	654.4	3

Note

The points system has changed over the years, leading to big jumps in some years.

== Feeder schools ==
The college has feeder schools throughout the city.

Many of the students go on to local universities Staffordshire and Keele.

== Notable staff and students ==
- Anthony Bale, medievalist
- Lee Chapman, student, footballer
- David Kidney, student, Labour MP
- Neil Morrissey, student, actor
- Anna Richardson, student, TV Presenter
- Imran Sherwani, student, hockey player
- Jonathan Wilkes, student, entertainer and friend of Robbie Williams
