= Hanley Town Hall =

Municipal building in Hanley, Staffordshire, England

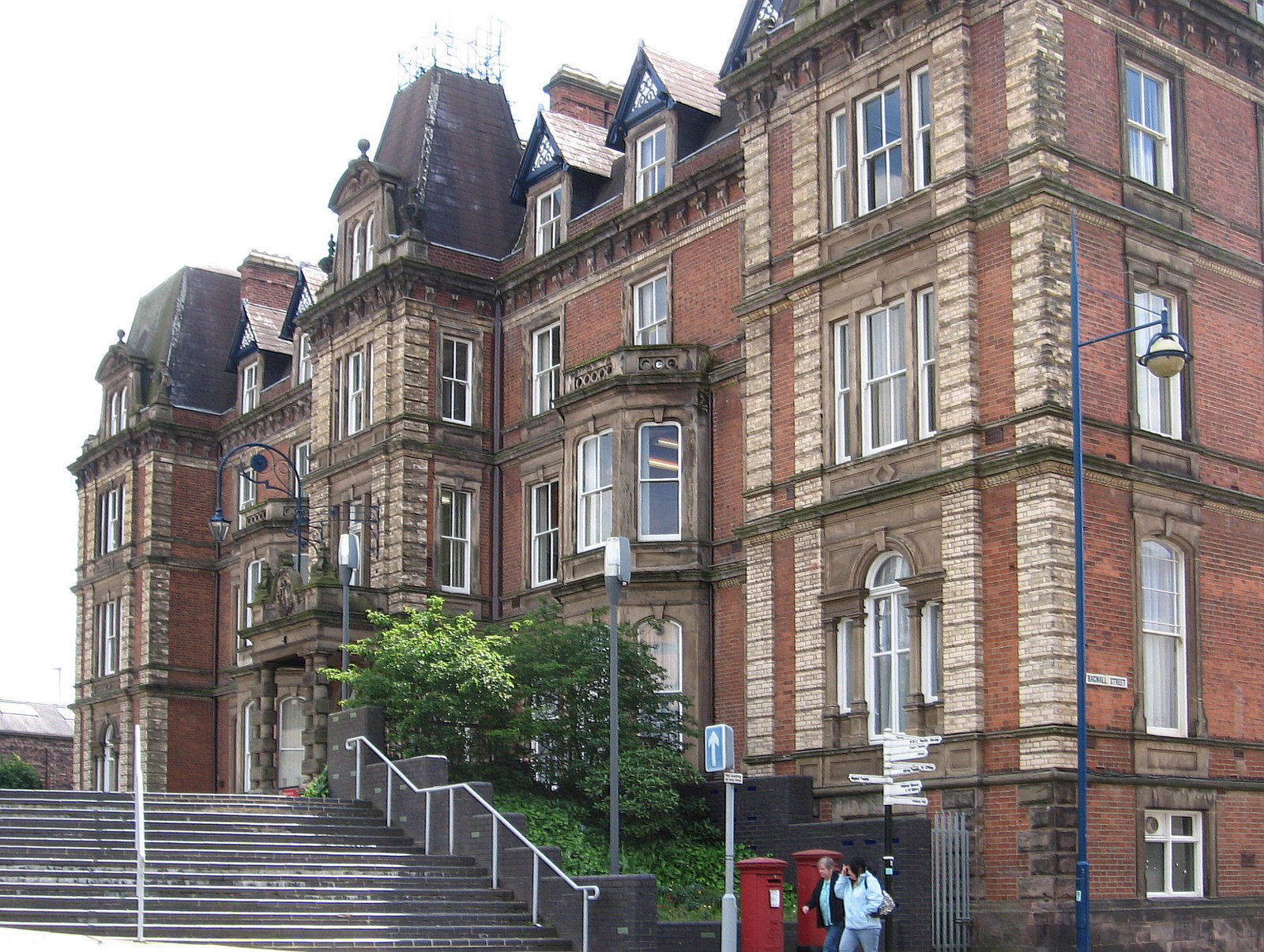
- Hanley Town Hall

- Shown in Staffordshire
- 53.0235°N 2.1754°W
- Location: Albion Square, Hanley

History
- Built: 1869

Site notes
- Architect: Robert Scrivener
- Architectural style: Renaissance style

Listed Building – Grade II
- Official name: Courts, Municipal Offices, Victoria Hall
- Designated: 18 May 1989
- Reference no.: 1297932

Hanley Town Hall is a municipal building in Albion Square in Hanley, Staffordshire, England. The building, which is used as the local register office, is a Grade II listed building.

== History ==
The first town hall in Hanley was erected in Town Road in around 1800; it was replaced by a second town hall, which was designed in the neoclassical style and erected in Fountain Square in 1845. Following significant population growth, largely associated with the potteries, the area became a municipal borough with the second town hall as its headquarters in 1857. (Note: The second town hall went on to become a branch of Lloyds Bank in 1886 but was demolished in 1936.)

The current structure in Albion Square, which was commissioned as a hotel, was built on the site of a private residence known as Bank House which dated back to the 18th century. The new building was designed by Robert Scrivener in the Renaissance style, built in red brick with stone dressings at a cost of £20,000 and was officially opened as the Queen's Hotel on 31 December 1869. The design involved a symmetrical main frontage with nine bays facing onto Albion Square with the central and end bays slightly projected forward and surmounted by mansard roofs. On the ground floor, the central bay featured a stone porch with paired rusticated columns supporting a canopy, while the end bays featured Venetian windows. At the upper levels, the central and end bays were fenestrated by tripartite sash windows on the first and second floors and by pairs of mullioned windows surmounted by segmental pediments at the attic level. The third and seventh bays were fenestrated by canted bay windows on the ground and first floors and the remainder of the spaces were fenestrated by single sash windows or, in the case of the spaces at attic level, by dormer windows.

By the 1880s, the company which had commissioned and was operating the hotel got in financial difficulties. Meanwhile, the borough council needed more space and decided to purchase the hotel in 1884: the building was converted for municipal use to a design by the borough surveyor, Joseph Lobley, and re-opened as a town hall with a council chamber, some municipal offices, and a series of courtrooms in 1886.

The town hall ceased to be the local seat of government when the county borough of Stoke-on-Trent was formed in March 1910. Following the loss of the ocean liner, RMS Titanic, in April 1912, a plaque was unveiled in the town hall to commemorate the life of Captain Edward Smith who had been born in the town: it noted that "Captain Smith having done all man could do for the safety of passengers and crew, remained at his post on the sinking ship until the end". A war memorial, in the form of a bronze figure on a pedestal, which was intended to commemorate the lives of local service personnel who had died in the First World War, was unveiled outside the town hall by the widow of the former mayor of Stoke-on-Trent, Major Cecil Wedgwood, on 11 November 1922.

For much of the 20th century, the building used by Stoke-on-Trent City Council as a venue for the delivery of local services, a courthouse and a local register office. After crown court hearings were moved to the new Stoke-on-Trent Combined Court Centre in Bethesda Street in Hanley in 1991, Hanley Town Hall no longer served in a judicial role and, after the register office moved to Stoke-upon-Trent Town Hall in October 2020, the council announced proposals to market Hanley Town Hall for sale.
