= St Mark's Church, Shelton =

Church of St Mark
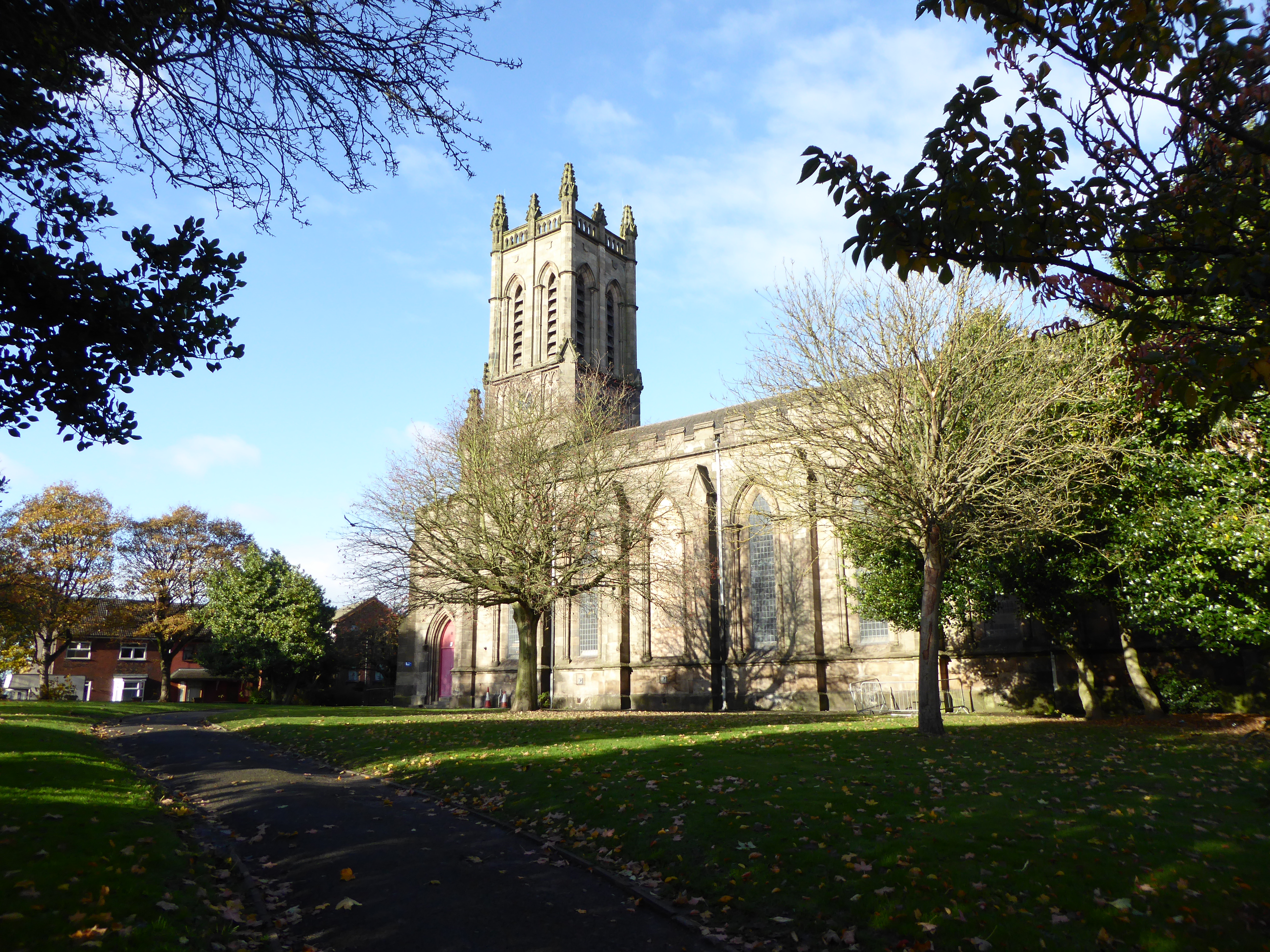
- Church of St Mark
- 53°01′08.08″N 2°10′55.05″W
- OS grid reference: SJ 87891 46861
- Location: Shelton, Stoke-on-Trent
- Country: England
- Denomination: Church of England
- Website: www.hanleyteamministry.org/st-marks-shelton

History
- Consecrated: 1834

Architecture
- Heritage designation: Grade II listed
- Designated: 15 March 1993
- Architect: John Oates
- Completed: 1834

Administration
- Diocese: Lichfield

St Mark's Church is an Anglican church in Shelton, in Stoke-on-Trent, Staffordshire, England, and in the Diocese of Lichfield. It is Grade II listed. It was built in 1834, and is a local landmark.

== History ==
It was a Commissioners' church, funded mostly by the Church Building Commissioners and also by subscription. The church, seating 2,100, was designed in Early English style by John Oates, and was consecrated on 19 June 1834 by Henry Ryder, Bishop of Lichfield. A new parish for the church was created in 1843, out of the parish of Stoke. Rectors of the church included from 1865 Samuel Nevill until 1871, when he became Bishop of Dunedin in New Zealand.

== Description ==
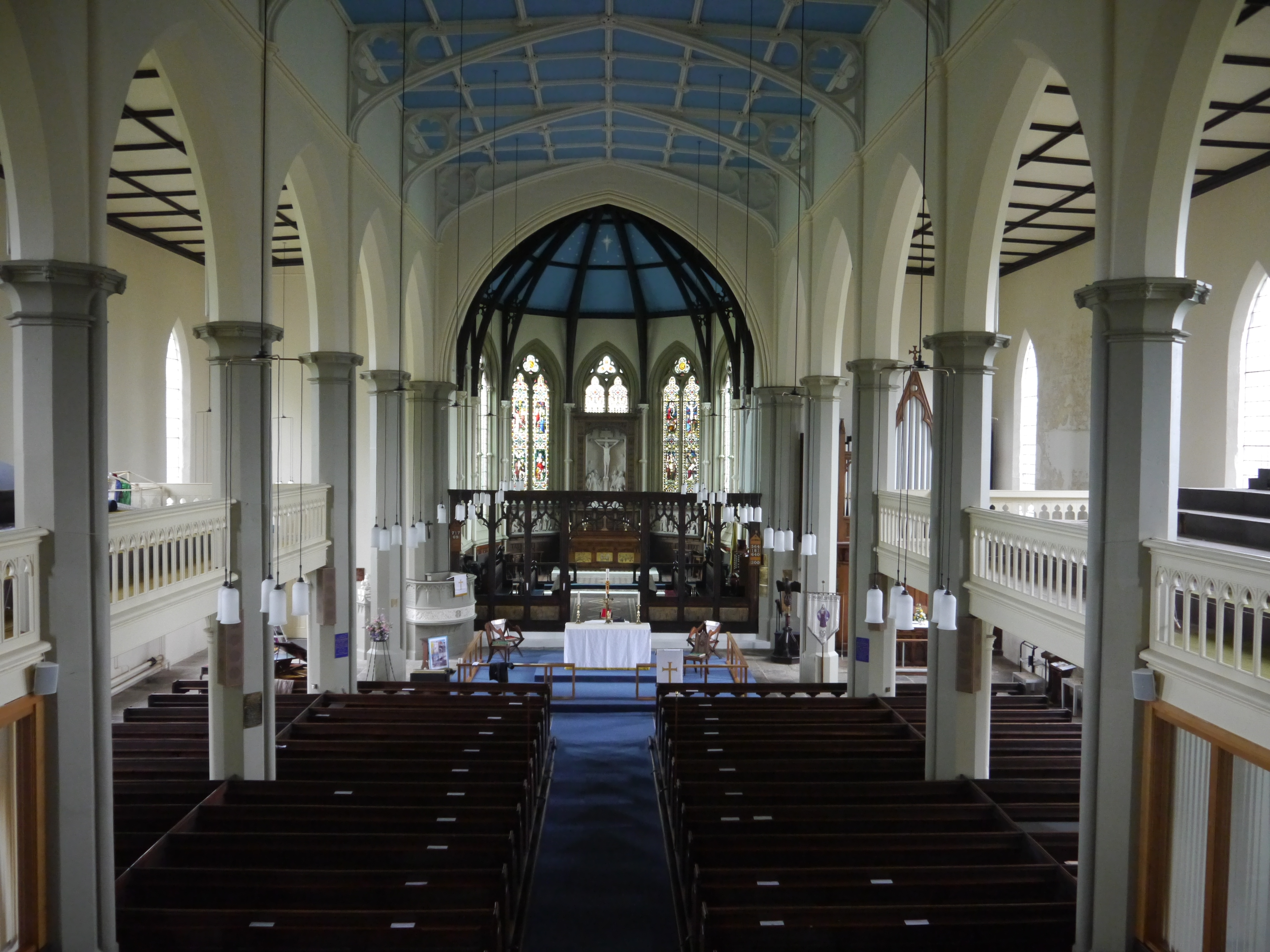
Looking towards the chancel

The building stands on high ground, and is a local landmark. The tower, 120 feet (37 m) high, has three stages, with a clock in the second stage; at the top is an arcaded parapet and eight crocketted pinnacles. The chancel was originally square, flanked by a porch and a vestry; it was replaced by a polygonal apsidal chancel, by R. Scrivener, in 1866. There are seven lancet windows on each side, separated externally by buttresses. At the corners the buttresses have turrets with pinnacles.

The entrance, at the west end, leads into an octagonal lobby, on each side of which are vestibules containing staircases to the galleries. There is a nave and two aisles. Tall arcades are supported by octagonal pillars. The galleries are on each side of the nave and at the west end. The reredos consists of three large terracotta reliefs by George Tinworth.

=== Heritage at Risk ===
The building is on Historic England's Heritage at Risk Register, assessed as being in poor condition.
