= Robert Kelsall =

English cricketer (born 1946)

Robert Stuart Kelsall (born 29 June 1946 in Stockport) is an English former first-class cricketer active 1969 who played for Nottinghamshire.
