= St Peter's Academy =

Location
- Fenton Manor; Stoke-on-Trent, Staffordshire, ST4 2RR; England
- Coordinates: 53.0048°N 2.1696°W

Information
- Type: Academy
- Religious affiliation: Church of England
- Established: 2013
- Local authority: Stoke-on-Trent
- Department for Education URN: 136824 Tables
- Ofsted: Reports
- Head Teacher: Michael Astley
- Gender: Mixed
- Age: 11 to 16
- Enrolment: 1114
- Houses: 8
- Colours: White, purple and blue

St. Peter's Academy is an Anglican secondary school in Stoke-on-Trent, England. It is an academy sponsored by the Woodard Academies and the Diocese of Lichfield. It is the merger of two former schools: Berryhill High School and Sports College and St Peter's High School.

== Construction ==
The school was built by Thomas Vale Construction costing £18.7 million; it was built as part of the Stoke-on-Trent City Councils BSF (Building Schools for the Future) Programme. Its construction started in 2011 and was completed in September 2013 as planned.
