= Henry Heath (Mormon pioneer) =

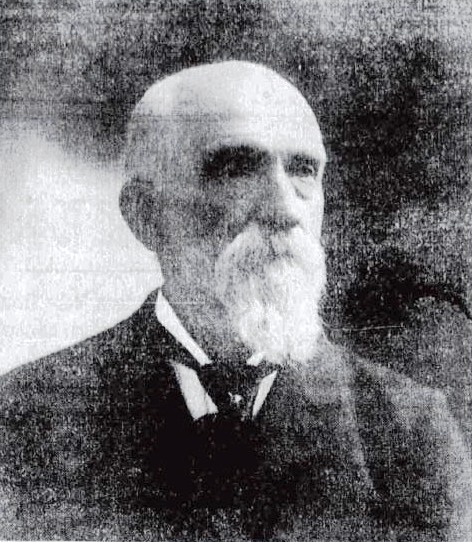
Henry Heath, later years

Henry Heath (November 22, 1828 – April 4, 1908) was a Mormon pioneer and lawman in the Utah Territory, United States.

== Family and early childhood ==
Heath was born in Hanley, Staffordshire, England on November 22, 1828, to John Heath and Barbara Hulme. He was the second of five children (Note: The 1841 census lists John, Barbara, four children and Nicholas Thomas Silcock, a boarder who would marry the oldest daughter, Jane, that same year. Another daughter, Sarah Jael Heath, was born in 1834, but died as a child before this census was taken.) Henry's father was a decorator of fine china, while his mother started out as a cook before practicing medicine for a short time.

Shortly after Heath's birth in 1828, his father became ill with typhoid fever. The illness left John Heath debilitated and unable to practice his trade. To supplement the family's income, Barbara Heath bought a bakery.

In 1834, when Henry was six years old, Nicholas Thomas Silcock (1819–1906) came to live with the Heaths. Silcock's mother Ann died when he was about 10 years old and his father, John Silcock, was a carpenter who was in and out of work until he died in 1847.

John Heath died of tuberculosis on September 8, 1841.

In the early 1840s, members of Heath's family, including his mother, converted to Mormonism.

== Emigration to Nauvoo ==
At age seventeen, Heath left England with his mother and two brothers on September 1, 1845. The family eventually settled in the Mormon community of Nauvoo, Illinois.

Nauvoo was in turmoil when Henry arrived after the death of Joseph Smith sixteen months earlier. Since that time, mobs of anti-Mormon agitators regularly harassed residents. By October 1845, the future of the Latter-day Saint settlement at Nauvoo was increasingly in doubt. Pressured by the state militia and continued mob violence, most residents were preparing to depart the city, ultimately for settlement in the American West. (See Mormon Pioneers article.) Edward Hunter and Nicholas Silcock secured a wagon (likely built by Silcock) and trained Henry and the boys to drive teams. They were scheduled to leave Nauvoo in February, but stayed behind with Hunter while he attempted to sell his considerable property in Nauvoo. When that proved futile, Barbara Heath and her three sons left Nauvoo in April, 1846 along with Edward Hunter and his family. The Heaths lived in Nauvoo for only six months. They traveled to Council Bluffs, Iowa, and then on to Winter Quarters at the North part of present-day Omaha Nebraska, arriving in September 1846. Nicholas and Jane Heath Silcock remained behind for one more month while Nicholas assisted in the final work on the Nauvoo temple. Several volumes in his own writing, plus numerous compilations of family history indicated Nicholas and Thomas did not immediately follow with the saints west. Poor and without funds, they would move to St. Louis where Thomas became the leader of the sixth ward of saints. Edward Hunter, a couple of years later back in St. Louis would encourage Thomas and Jane to move west to avoid a bad fever plague hindering Jane's health in the St. Louis area.

== Orphan ==
At Winter Quarters, the sudden influx of approximately 2,500 settlers strained local resources. Despite efforts to trade with local residents and American Indians, many suffered from scurvy due to the lack of fresh vegetables in their diet. Still weak from a battle with malaria ("ague") contracted en route from Nauvoo, Barbara Heath contracted scurvy and, "lay ill for fourteen weeks." (Note: Fourteen weeks is likely an embellishment since Barbara Heath arrived at Winter Quarters in September, 1846 and died on October 20 that year. It does indicate, however, a protracted struggle with scurvy, malaria or both.) She died October 20, 1846, from either scurvy or malaria and was buried in an unmarked grave. Her name is listed, however, on a memorial to Mormons who died at Winter Quarters. Barbara's death left Henry (aged 18) and his two brothers, Thomas (15) and Frederick (13) orphaned.

== Trek to Salt Lake Valley ==
Edward Hunter became the Heaths' surrogate father. He led a wagon company of 155 people and 59 wagons from Winter Quarters to the Great Salt Lake Valley. Henry, and most likely Thomas Heath, were teamsters in the company. They are listed as members of the company in a letter sent from the trail by Hunter to Church leaders on August 17, 1847. Henry departed Winter Quarters June 19 and entered the Salt Lake Valley on October 1, 1847.

== Exploration of the Southern Great Basin ==
By 1849, the Mormon pioneers were well established in the Salt Lake Valley, and their leader, Brigham Young, was anxious to branch out. At his request, the territorial legislature commissioned an exploring party to map the country to the south and identify areas that would make good settlements. Parley P. Pratt led the party that departed on Nov 23, 1849. Henry Heath was one of the 47 men in the company who explored as far south as the confluence of the Virgin River and Muddy rivers (south of present-day St. George, Utah). They traveled over 526 miles, identified more than 26 sites for future settlement, described soil, vegetation and watershed and charted the transportation routes used in settlement.

The expedition departed at the beginning of winter and soon encountered bitter cold and deep snow. The original plan was to go to the southern end of the Virgin River gorge. By the time they reached the Muddy river, supplies were running low. (Several men on horseback did explore part of the Virgin River gorge.) On the return journey they traveled north, encountering deep snow that made travel with the wagons extremely difficult. At one point they even removed the wheels from the wagons and attempted to pull them like sleds over the snow.

In January 1850 the expedition was mired in snow near present-day Filmore, Utah. With supplies running dangerously low, Pratt decided to take about 20 of the infirm, older and married men on horseback and sprint to Fort Utah (present-day Provo, Utah), approximately 100 miles north. From there he could send a rescue party back to the main body of the expedition. He did so, barely making it to Fort Utah alive. Henry Heath remained with the main body of the expedition bivouacked near Filmore. They survived mainly on rabbits and sleeping in holes in the snow. Although a rescue party was sent back, it was seven weeks before the snow was melted enough to return with the wagons.

== Marriage and family ==
Henry Heath married Sarah Ann Bird on February 19, 1851, at Salt Lake City, Utah Territory. The marriage was performed by Parley P. Pratt. Henry and Sarah gave birth to 12 children born from 1852 to 1878. (Note: The 1860 census lists four children, including Sarah Malissa who died at age nine. "United States Census, 1860," index, FamilySearch (https://familysearch.org/pal:/MM9.1.1/MH24-MHW : accessed 3 April 2012), Henry Heath (, Great Salt Lake, Utah).. The 1870 census lists seven children, two having died previously. "United States Census, 1870," index and images, FamilySearch (https://familysearch.org/pal:/MM9.3.1/TH-267-12865-130271-86?cc=1438024: accessed 3 April 2012), Henry Heath (Utah, United States). The 1880 census lists the three youngest children, "United States Census, 1880," index, FamilySearch (https://familysearch.org/pal:/MM9.1.1/MNSV-T6V : accessed 3 April 2012), Henry Heath (Salt Lake City, Salt Lake, Utah).) All of the children were born in Salt Lake City, Utah.

== Frontier lawman ==
Henry Heath worked as a law enforcement officer from as early as 1862 until at least 1868. During that time he participated in several cases that typified the rough-hewn legal system in the American West. The most famous, the apprehension of a grave robber, has been widely embellished, prompting at least one article attempting to debunk some of the more fantastical claims. Contemporary accounts paint a much less sensational picture.

In 1862, Henry discovered evidence of grave robbery in the city cemetery when following up on the burial of indigent criminal Moroni Clawson, who was killed in a shoot-out with other officers. His investigation soon led him to the house of the grave digger, Jean-Baptiste, where he found piles of clothing pilfered from graves in the cemetery. Henry feared that the grave-digger may have disturbed the grave of his daah Malissa, who had died within the last year. He apprehended Baptiste and took him to Sarah's grave site. Interviewed years later, Henry said he had determined to kill Baptiste on the spot if he had robbed his child's grave. Baptiste was able to satisfy Henry that Sarah's grave was untouched and so his life was spared.

With Baptiste apprehended, Henry's problem quickly turned from revenge to protection. He reported that, "The news of our discovery and Baptiste's confession spread like wildfire and it was with difficulty that we got him to the county jail in safety." Baptiste had been at his macabre misdemeanors for some time and so his crimes touched hundreds in the community. But grave robbing, however repugnant, was not a capital offense, even in the frontier west and Baptiste's capture posed the problem of how to both protect and punish him.

One of the officers, Albert Dewey, described the community response: "It meant death to him to turn him loose in the community. So, to give him a chance for his life, to save him in reality from an exasperated public, it was decided to banish him and a well-stocked island in the Great Salt Lake was chosen for his future home. He was conveyed there but there was not ball and chain or shackles or gyves of any kind on his limbs. He was absolutely untrammeled." Baptiste's forehead was tattooed, "Banded for robbing the dead," with ink, not with hot irons. Some recent dramatizations of Baptiste's case have his ears being clipped or "docked." Detailed accounts recorded at the time of the banishment have no mention of such treatment.

Contemporary accounts, including Henry Heath's own, do not indicate whether he participated in Jean-Baptiste's banishment, but Henry's involvement with the grave robber certainly ended at that point if not before. None of contemporary sources cited in the Deseret News account, including Heath and Dewey, believed that Baptiste remained on the island for any length of time. Most believe that he drowned attempting to leave the island or that he actually escaped and fled the state.

== Later life ==
Heath continued to work as a law-enforcement officer until at least 1868. During that time, he also farmed land in Salt Lake City and worked as a night watchman to support his large family. He was well known in the community and was celebrated later in his life as one of the original Utah pioneers of 1847. He died in Salt Lake City on March 30, 1908.
