= Shelton, Staffordshire =

Coordinates: 53.0121°N 02.1758°W

Shelton
- Location within Staffordshire
- Population: 10,594
- OS grid reference: SJ883461
- Unitary authority: Stoke-on-Trent
- Ceremonial county: Staffordshire
- Region: West Midlands
- Country: England
- Sovereign state: United Kingdom
- Post town: STOKE-ON-TRENT
- Postcode district: ST4
- Dialling code: 01782
- Police: Staffordshire
- Fire: Staffordshire
- Ambulance: West Midlands
- UK Parliament: Stoke-on-Trent Central

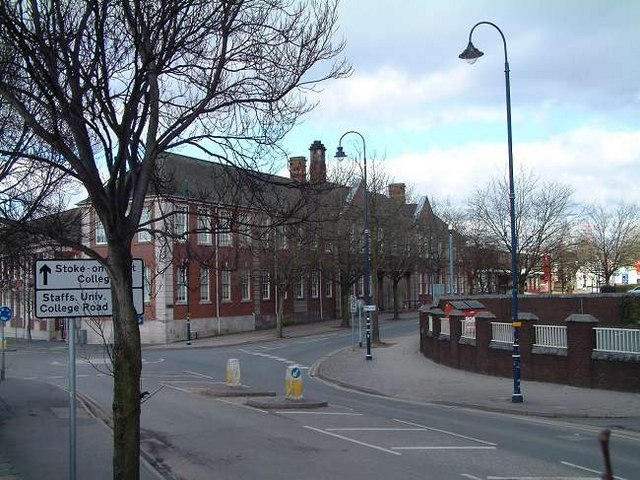
Staffordshire University campus frontage

Shelton is an area of the city of Stoke-on-Trent in Staffordshire, England, between Hanley and Stoke-upon-Trent.

== History ==
The route of the Roman Road called the Rykeneld Street passed very close to Stoke-on-Trent railway station.

Shelton had an artisan pottery industry which was documented as early as 1685, when one Thomas Miles was producing white stoneware.

Shelton had the earliest gas works in the Potteries. The works were opened in Shelton's Lower Bedford Street, under the ownership of the British Gaslight Company, to supply Hanley and Stoke in 1825.

The British Pottery Manufacturer's Federation Club, a large private member's club in Federation House opposite Stoke-on-Trent railway station, was established in 1951, and still operates.

== Current profile ==
Shelton is the home of the main University of Staffordshire campus and library, which specialises in art and design teaching. The presence of a major university has resulted in the residential area having a large student population during term-time. Shelton mostly consists of Victorian terraced houses and is occupied by a combination of owner-occupiers, students, and private tenants. Families tend to cluster more around the western edges of Hanley Park and around the large cemetery that stretches north into Cliff Vale. These latter two protected green spaces, along with the route of the Cauldon Canal, serve as a natural buffer between Shelton and the south of Hanley (the "city centre").

The 2001 Census defined Shelton as "multicultural".

Religion (2001):

- Christian 19.4%
- Muslim 48.2%
- Hindu 1.3%
- Sikh 0.3%

== University of Staffordshire and two colleges ==
University of Staffordshire's main campus and library are a few yards from Stoke-on-Trent railway station. Stoke-on-Trent College is at the northern boundary of Shelton. The city's Sixth Form College is also nearby.

Within the grounds of the university is the Film Theatre, a purpose-built cinema which during term-time shows art-house films. There is also a large art supplies shop that serves the many art students and which is open to the public. The University Library can be joined by members of the public for a small annual fee. Each year in June the campus becomes a public art and design show, as the graduates show their final work.
