= Sam Kelsall =

English cricketer

Personal information
- Full name: Samuel Kelsall
- Born: 14 March 1993 (age 33); Stoke-on-Trent, Staffordshire, England
- Batting: Right-handed
- Bowling: Right-arm medium

Domestic team information
- Years: Team
- 2011–2014: Nottinghamshire (squad no. 18)
- 2015: Lincolnshire
- 2016–2019: Staffordshire
- FC debut: 2 August 2011 Nottinghamshire v Durham
- LA debut: 10 August 2011 Nottinghamshire v Sri Lanka A

Career statistics
Competition	First-class	List A
Matches	3	4
Runs scored	112	84
Batting average	18.66	21.00
100s/50s	0/1	0/0
Top score	57	40
Catches/stumpings	2/–	1/–
- Source: Cricinfo, 12 September 2015

Samuel Kelsall (born 14 March 1993) is an English cricketer. Kelsall is a right-handed batsman who bowls right-arm medium pace. He was born in Stoke-on-Trent, Staffordshire. He was educated at Trentham High School.

Kelsall made his first-class debut for Nottinghamshire against Durham in the 2011 County Championship. He played two further first-class matches for Nottinghamshire, the last of which was against Oxford MCC University in 2014. Kelsall also played four List A matches for the county between 2011 and 2014. At the end of 2014 session he was released by Nottinghamshire.

In 2015, Kelsall joined Lincolnshire and played Minor counties cricket before joining Staffordshire in 2016. In total Kelsall played 22 Minor Counties Championship matches and 15 MCCA Knockout Trophy matches and 4 Minor Counties T20 matches. In November 2019, he was appointed captain of Staffordshire taking over from Kadeer Ali. However Kelsall resigned from the role and made himself unavailable for future matches in August 2020, the club cited "disagreements with the committee regarding coaching structures and selection policy". He failed to lead the side in a competitive match as the NCCA had cancelled the 2020 season due to the coronavirus pandemic.
