= Glodwick =

Coordinates: 53.53712°N 2.08446°W

- Location within Greater Manchester
- OS grid reference: SD944045
- Metropolitan borough: Oldham
- Metropolitan county: Greater Manchester
- Region: North West
- Country: England
- Sovereign state: United Kingdom
- Post town: OLDHAM
- Postcode district: OL1-OL2, OL4
- Dialling code: 0161
- Police: Greater Manchester
- Fire: Greater Manchester
- Ambulance: North West
- UK Parliament: Oldham East and Saddleworth; Oldham West and Royton

Glodwick is an area of Oldham, Greater Manchester, England. It is south-east of Oldham town centre.

Glodwick is a multi-ethnic residential area in the south of Oldham, home particularly to a large community of Pakistanis and British Pakistanis.

Glodwick is marked architecturally by Oldham's history with the Industrial Revolution, particularly cotton spinning. Much of Glodwick's housing remain as red-brick terraces, built originally as dwellings for Oldham's many cotton mill workers.

== History ==
=== Toponymy ===
The name Glodwick was recorded first as Glodic in the 1190s. The first element may be a Brittonic word related to Welsh clawdd, meaning "ditch, hedge". Gloddaeth in Wales may have a similar etymology. The second part of the name is harder to explain, but may be the Old English dic, likewise meaning "ditch", added later to the Brittonic word, or derive from the Old English wīc meaning farm, dairy farm or settlement.

=== Medieval history ===
Lying within the historic county boundaries of Lancashire since the early 12th century, Glodwick, one of the oldest parts of Oldham, was recorded in 1212 as being one of five parts of the thegnage estate of Kaskenmoor, which was held on behalf of King John by Roger de Montbegon and William de Nevill. The other parts of this estate were Crompton, Oldham, Sholver and Werneth. Glodwick later formed part of the township of Oldham within the ancient ecclesiastical parish of Prestwich-cum-Oldham, in the hundred of Salford.

=== Industrial revolution ===
In the late-19th and early-20th centuries, Glodwick provided a base for many of the cotton mills that made Oldham the most productive mill town in the world. Spinning companies like Samuel Milne, Lees & Wrigley, James Collinge & Sons and Bagley & Wright brought employment to the area.

=== Riots ===
In May 2001, Glodwick was the centre of controversy as it was at the heart of the Oldham Riots - large scale rioting said to be fuelled by long-term under-lying racial tensions between local white and South Asian communities. The rioting gained international media coverage, and were said to be the worst racially-motivated riots in the United Kingdom for fifteen years prior, briefly eclipsing the sectarian violence seen in Northern Ireland.

== Landmarks ==
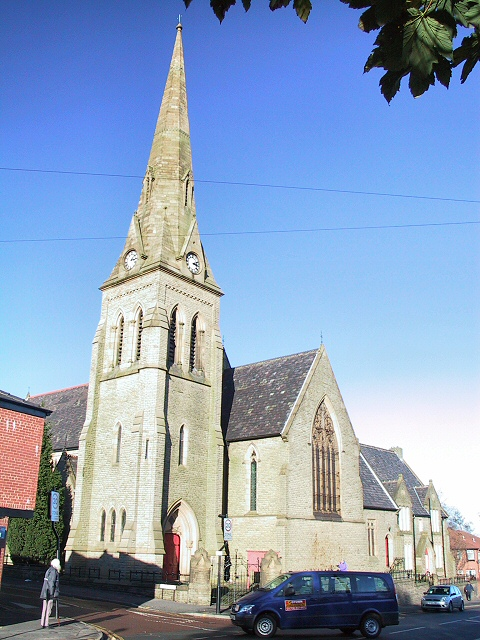
St Mark's Church

One of Glodwick's best-known features is Alexandra Park.

Greengate Street Mosque is Oldham's largest mosque.

St Mark's Church stands on the hill above Oldham at Glodwick. It is the parish church for the area.

=== Lowside Brickworks ===
Close to Glodwick is a disused quarry that has been designated as a Site of special scientific interest (SSSI) known as Lowside Brickworks. The site is only 3.5 acres (1.4 hectares) but has considerable geological interest. It has yielded bivalves from the Carboniferous period showing how they interacted with the sediment, which also helps understanding of their morphological variation. Lowside Brickworks is one of 21 SSSIs in the Greater Manchester area.

== Second World War ==
On 24 December 1944, at 5.50am, a V-1 flying bomb fell on Abbey Hills Road near to the junction with Warren Lane. The explosion killed 32 people and destroyed a large number of houses. The bomb was one of over thirty released that morning by a large formation of German Heinkel He 111 bombers just off the North East coast of England.

== Transport ==
Bee Network operate the following services in Glodwck

425 service runs through Glodwick to Holts Estate via Abbeyhills and to Oldham Bus Station

There is no railway station nearby, Glodwick Road station having closed in 1955 and then the subsequent nearby closure of Oldham Mumps train station in 2009, but there is a nearby Metrolink stop, which is Oldham Mumps and Oldham Central Tram Stop currently providing links to Chorlton via Manchester Victoria Tram Stop and Rochdale.

== Notable people ==
- William Joyce, was a short-term resident of Glodwick.
- Joseph Lees (1748–1824) - regional dialect poet from Glodwick, who wrote Jone o Grinfilt. He was a hand-loom weaver and schoolteacher accustomed to "study on his seatboard, and when he had thrown a few ideas into rhyme he stopt picking-o'er and wrote it down".
