= Sandon Primary Academy =

Information
- Established: July 4, 1939
- Local authority: Stoke-on-Trent City Council
- Department for Education URN: 140872 Tables
- Ofsted: Reports
- Principal: Rachel Beckett
- Gender: Co-educational
- Age: 2 to 11
- Website: https://www.sandonprimaryacademy.com/

Sandon Primary Academy, is a co-educational primary school situated in the Meir area of Stoke-On-Trent, Staffordshire, England.

== History ==
The first instance of Sandon Primary Academy was opened on 4th July, 1939 and was named "Sandon Road Infants School & Sandon Road Junior School". Following the next three decades and the conclusion of World War II, the school would be renamed in 1957 to "Grange Infants School".

In 1970, the school would be renamed "Grange First School" after city school reorganisation. Later in September 1983, the school would combine two schools into one, leading to a name change of "Grange Primary School".

In 2002, Grange Primary School would be renamed to "Sandon Primary School" before converting into an academy in 2014 and being renamed to its current name, "Sandon Primary Academy". In 2017, the school would receive an "Outstanding" rating by Ofsted.

In 2018, the school would then begin to construct a swimming pool, which after completion was opened by breaststroke swimmer, Adam Peaty.
