= Birches Head Academy =

Birches Head

Location
- Birches Head Road, Hanley; Stoke-on-Trent, Staffordshire, ST2 8DD; England
- Coordinates: 53.0396°N 2.1518°W

Information
- Former name: Birches Head High School
- Type: Academy
- Motto: Aspire to be more
- Local authority: Stoke-on-Trent City Council
- Trust: Frank Field Education Trust
- Department for Education URN: 148220 Tables
- Ofsted: Reports
- Head teacher: Paul Masher
- Gender: Mixed
- Age range: 11–16
- Enrolment: 1024 (2023)
- Website: www.bircheshead.org.uk

Birches Head Academy (formerly Birches Head High School) is an 11–16 mixed, secondary school with academy status in Hanley, Stoke-on-Trent, Staffordshire, England. It is part of the Frank Field Education Trust.
