= Hanley =

One of the Six Towns of Stoke-on-Trent, in Staffordshire, England

Coordinates: 53.0246°N 2.1729°W

Hanley: City
- Federated town and city centre
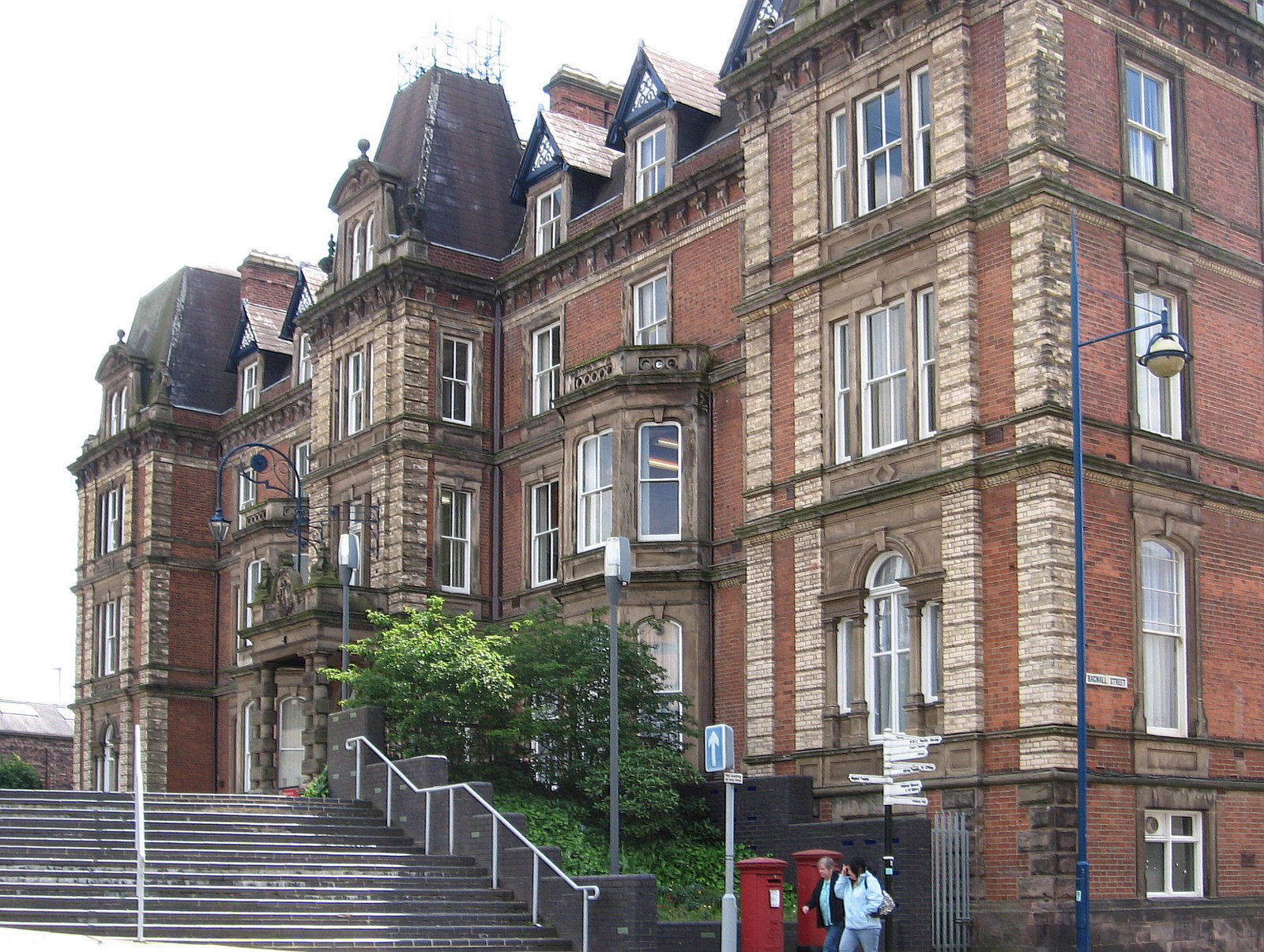
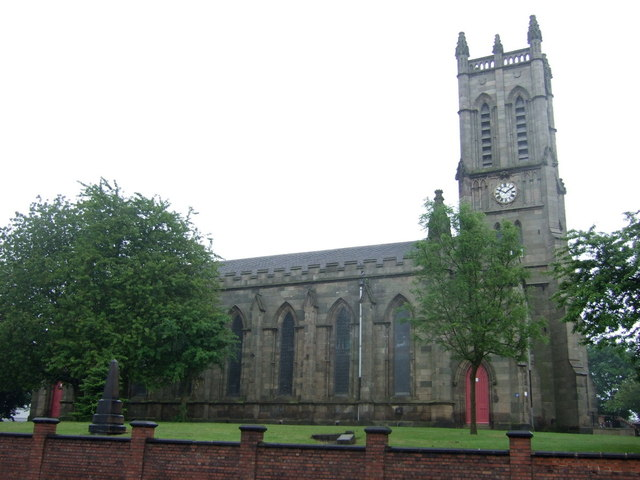
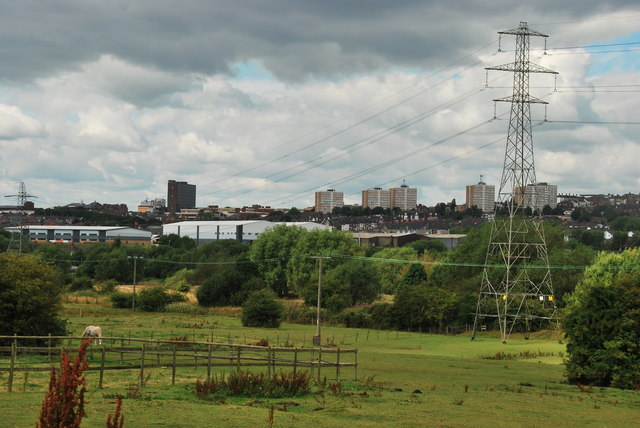
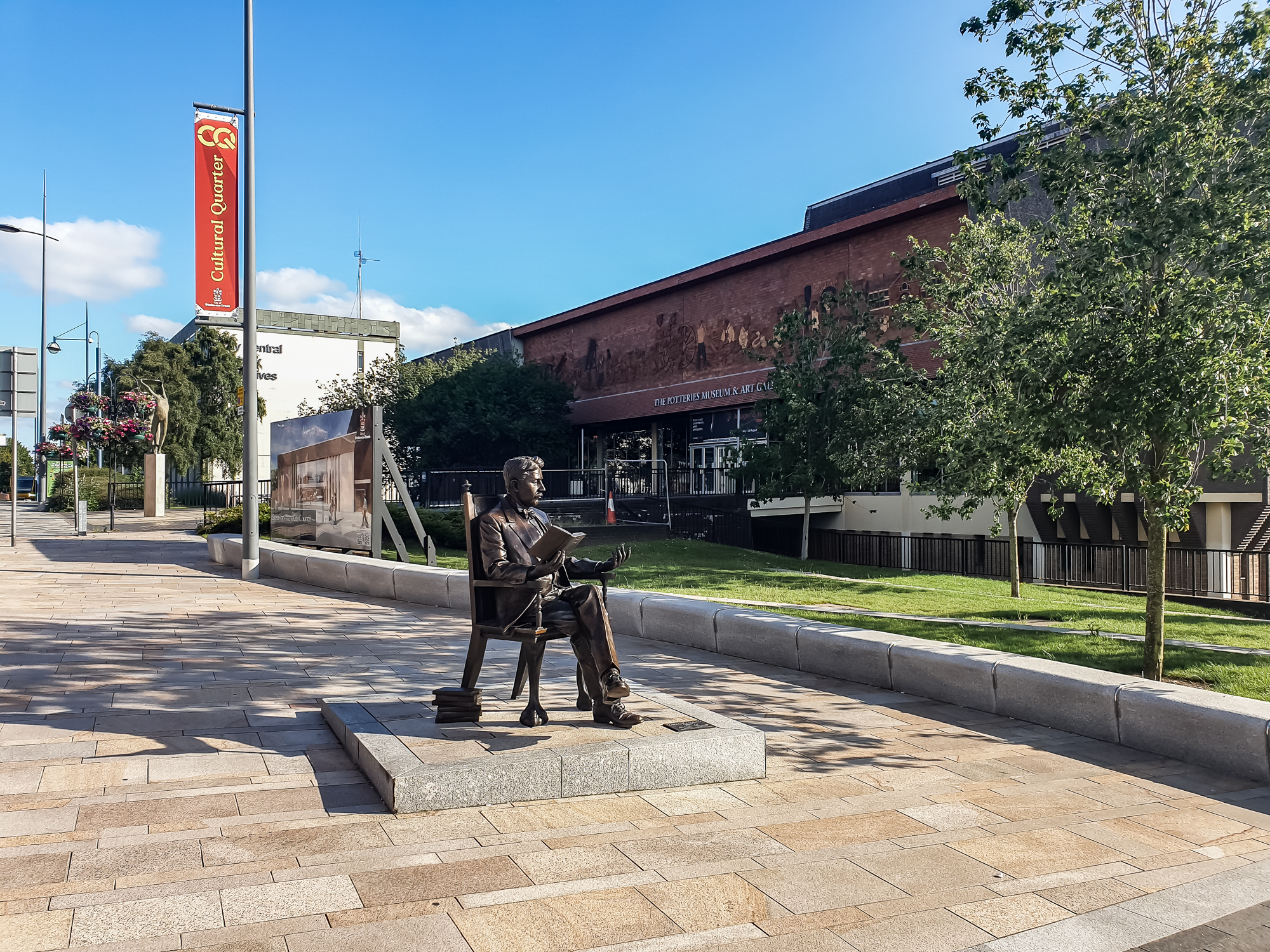
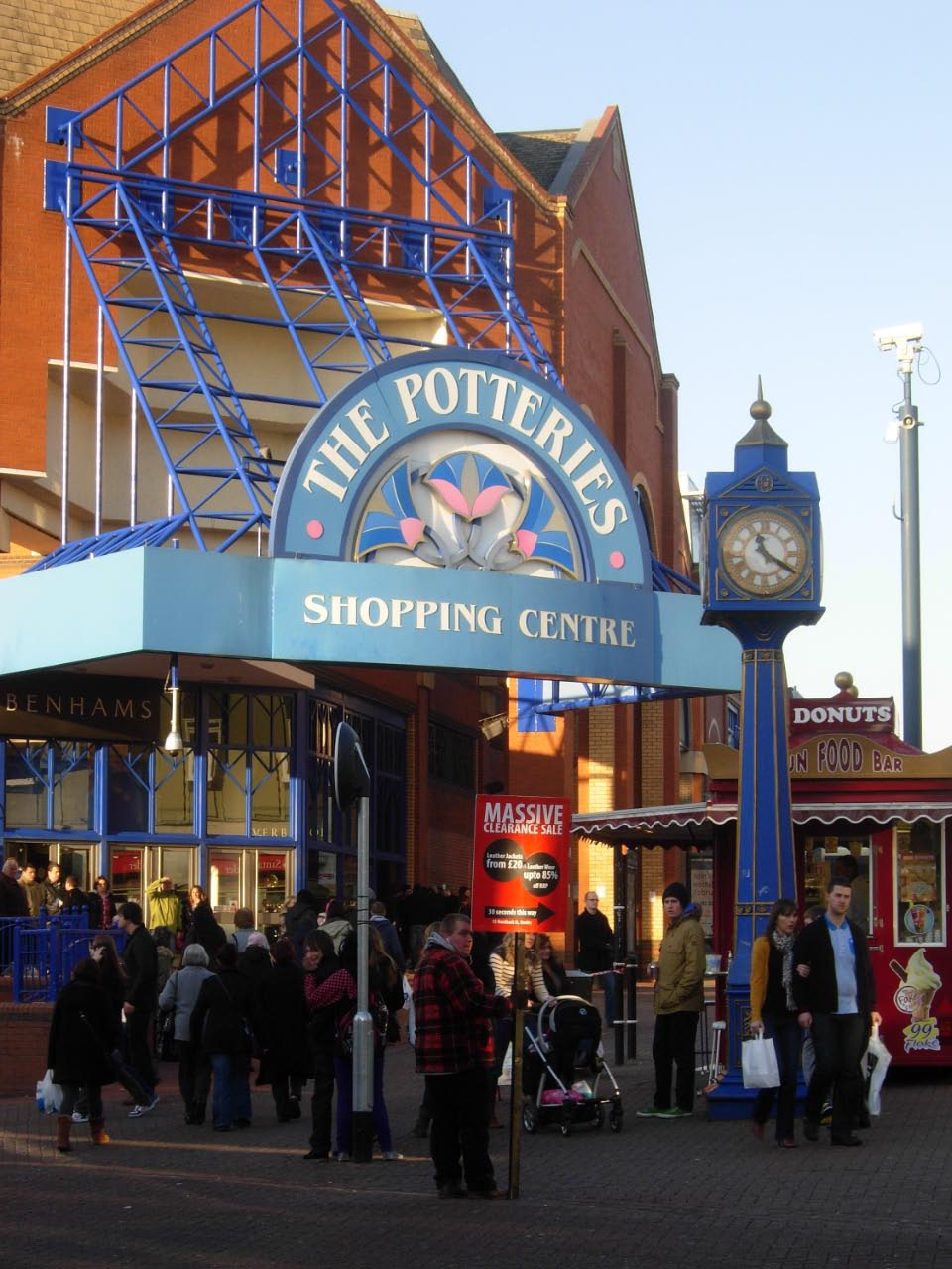
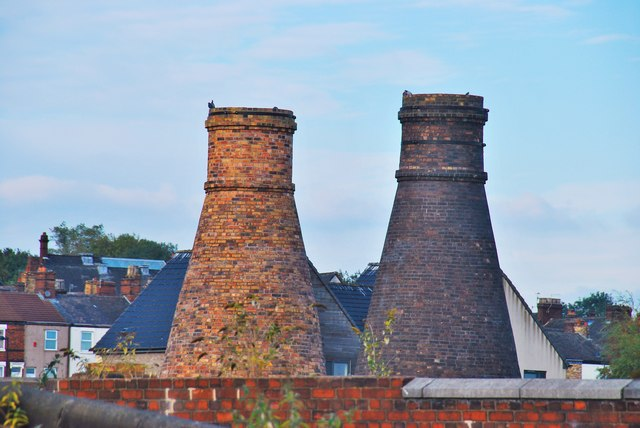
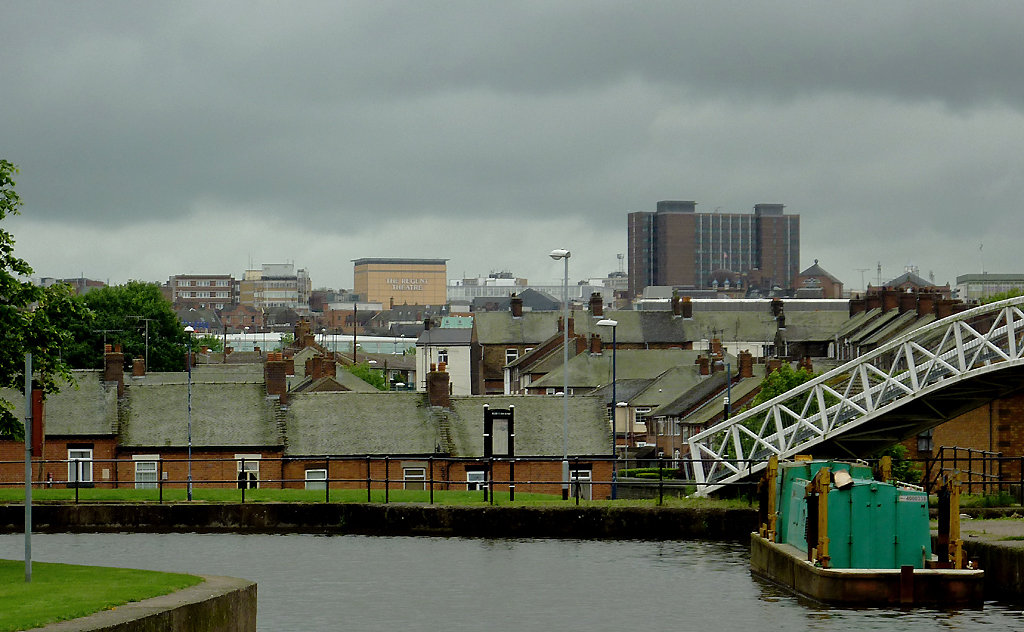
- Top: Hanley Old Town Hall; Upper: St Marks Church and High Rise Flats; Lower: Arnold Bennett Statue outside the Potteries Museum and the Potteries Shopping Centre; Bottom: Preserved Bottle Kilns and Skyline

- Location within Staffordshire
- OS grid reference: SJ880480
- Unitary authority: Stoke-on-Trent
- Ceremonial county: Staffordshire
- Region: West Midlands
- Country: England
- Sovereign state: United Kingdom
- Districts of the town: List: Birches Head; Cliffe Vale; Cobridge (part); Etruria; Northwood; Shelton; Sneyd Green
- Post town: STOKE-ON-TRENT
- Postcode district: ST1
- Dialling code: 01782
- Police: Staffordshire
- Fire: Staffordshire
- Ambulance: West Midlands
- UK Parliament: Stoke-on-Trent Central

Hanley is one of the six towns that, along with Burslem, Longton, Fenton, Tunstall and Stoke-upon-Trent, amalgamated to form the city of Stoke-on-Trent in Staffordshire, England. The town is the main business, commercial and cultural hub of the wider Potteries area.

== History ==
=== Etymology ===
The name Hanley comes from either "haer lea", meaning "high meadow", or "heah lea" meaning "rock meadow".

=== Municipal origins ===
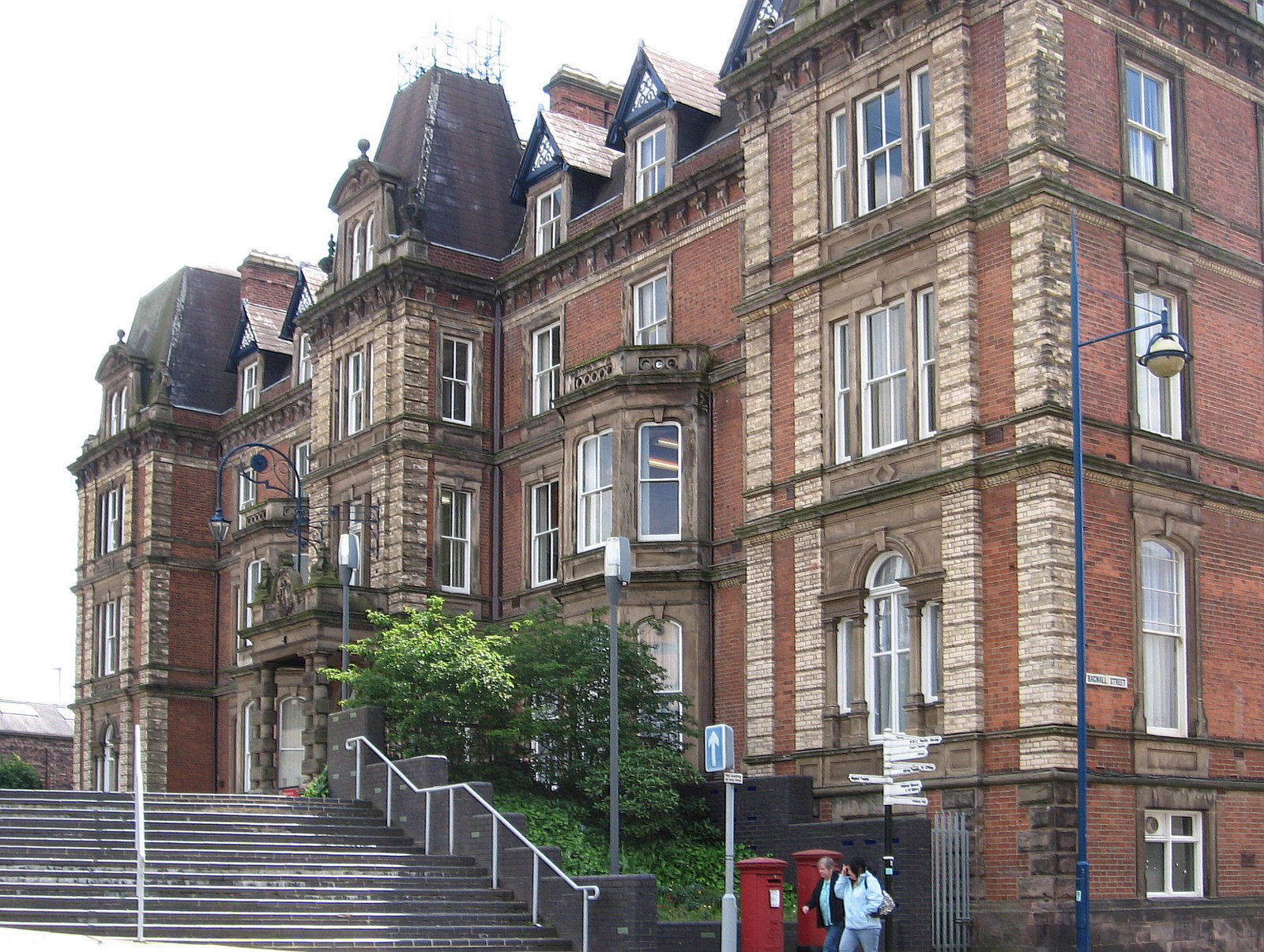
Hanley Town Hall

Hanley was incorporated as a municipal borough in 1857 and became a county borough with the passage of the Local Government Act 1888. On 31 December 1894 Hanley became a civil parish, being formed from part of Stoke-upon-Trent. The borough was based at Hanley Town Hall. In 1910, along with Burslem, Tunstall, Fenton, Longton and Stoke-upon-Trent, it was federated into the county borough of Stoke-on-Trent. Hanley was the only one of the six towns to be a county borough before the merger; its status was transferred to the enlarged borough. On 1 April 1922 the parish was abolished and merged with Stoke-on-Trent. At the 1921 census (the last before the abolition of the parish), Hanley had a population of 67,891. In 1925, following the granting of city status, it became one of the six towns that constitute the City of Stoke-on-Trent.

=== Coal mining ===
At one time, there were many coal mines in North Staffordshire. Hanley Deep Pit was opened in 1854. It was the deepest pit in the North Staffordshire coalfield, reaching a depth of 1,500 feet. At its peak in the 1930s it employed some 2,000 men and boys often producing 9,000 long tons (9,100 tonnes) of coal a week. The pit was closed in 1962 but much of the headgear and spoilheaps were left in situ. Then, in the 1980s, the original site was cleared, landscaped and converted into Central Forest Park. Coal miners in the Hanley and Longton area ignited the 1842 General Strike and associated Pottery Riots. The College Road drill hall was completed in 1903.

=== Garden Festival ===
The 1986 Stoke-on-Trent Garden Festival led to the reclamation of large areas of land west of the city centre – including the former Shelton steelworks - which had been derelict since 1978. When the Garden Festival closed the land remained derelict for some time before being redeveloped into public parkland and retail and leisure.

== Public transport ==
In 2013, a new bus station opened in Hanley. This replaced the former bus station on Lichfield Street. The new bus station was the first stage in the regeneration project which will see the previous bus station demolished and replaced with a new centre consisting of shops, restaurants and a cinema. The new bus station is bigger than its predecessor and has seen various routes in and out of the city changed to accommodate its location. The bus station features a sheltered waiting area, shop, cafe and toilets and is covered by CCTV, with digital timetables showing information on travel times for the day, as well as Now/Next above the entrance to each bay. Access to the station is controlled by automatic doors at both the pedestrian entrance and coach bays.

The new bus station links Hanley with towns in North Staffordshire, as well as Buxton, Crewe, Shrewsbury, and Stafford. Most services are run by First Potteries, though there are a number of smaller independent operators, such as D&G Bus, and Arriva Midlands. In addition, National Express Coaches connect Hanley with destinations including London, Birmingham, Liverpool and Manchester, with additional seasonal services to holiday destinations. As part of the redevelopment of the town and wider city, a new bus interchange was opened on John Street in March 2013, allowing the current station to be demolished to make room for further redevelopment of the town.

Hanley no longer has a railway station but there was once one located on Trinity Street on the Potteries Loop Line, which was opened by the North Staffordshire Railway for passengers on 13 July 1864. The station survived for 100 years but it was closed in 1964 as part of the Beeching Axe and the land is now a car park. The nearest railway station is in Stoke-on-Trent, 1.6 miles (2.6 km) south-southwest of Hanley bus station.

Hanley is connected to the waterways network; it meets the Trent and Mersey Canal at Festival Park and it is also connected to the east of the country via the Caldon Canal.

== Cultural sites ==
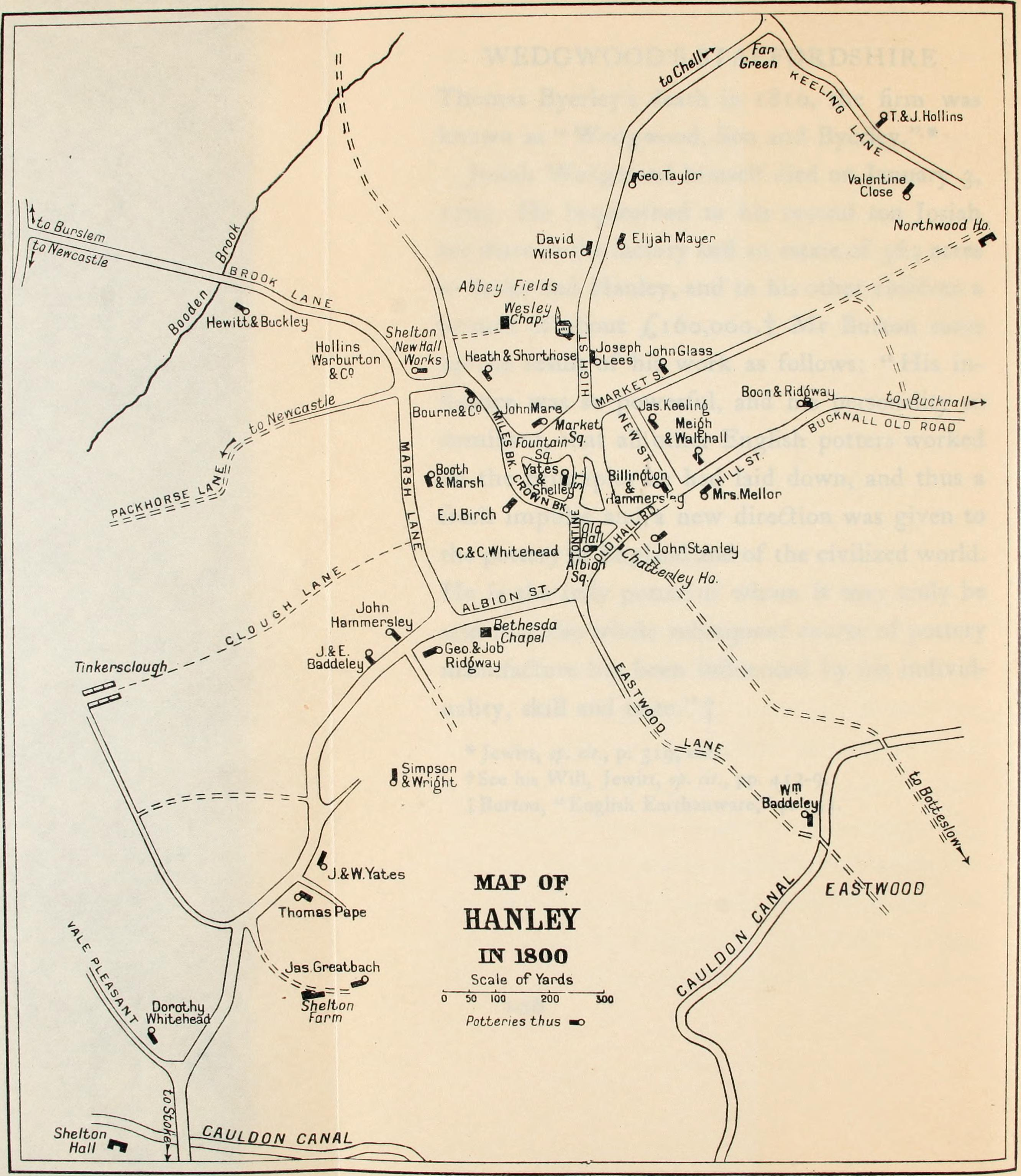
Map of Hanley in 1800, showing over 20 potteries, including Ridgway Potteries.

Hanley has several cultural facilities such as the Potteries Museum & Art Gallery (a large ceramics collection, and restored Spitfire), the Victoria Hall, the Regent Theatre and BBC Radio Stoke's studios are based in the town.

== Religion ==
Christian churches and chapels in Hanley include:

- Bethel Evangelical Free Church (Newhall Street),
- Bethesda Town Mission (Jasper Street),
- Church of Jesus Christ of Latter-day Saints (Cardiff Grove),
- Church of Scientology (Warner Street),
- Congregational Independent Tabernacle Church (High Street),
- Elim Church (Bucknall Old Road, corner of Mynors Street, Northwood),
- Etruria Wesleyan Chapel (Etruria Old Road, Etruria),
- Holy Trinity C of E (Lower Mayer Street, Northwood),
- Providence Methodist Church (Junction of Town Road, and Hulton Street),
- St. John's C of E (Town Road, Hanley),
- St. Luke's C of E (Wellington Terrace),
- St. Mark's C of E (Broad Street, Shelton),
- Mt. Zion Pentecostal Faith Temple (Shelton),
- St. Matthew's C of E (Birches Head),
- Sacred Heart RC (Jasper Street), Trinity Methodist (Keelings Road, Northwood), and
- St Simon and St Jude (Seaford Street, College Road (was Victoria Road), Shelton).

== Notable people ==
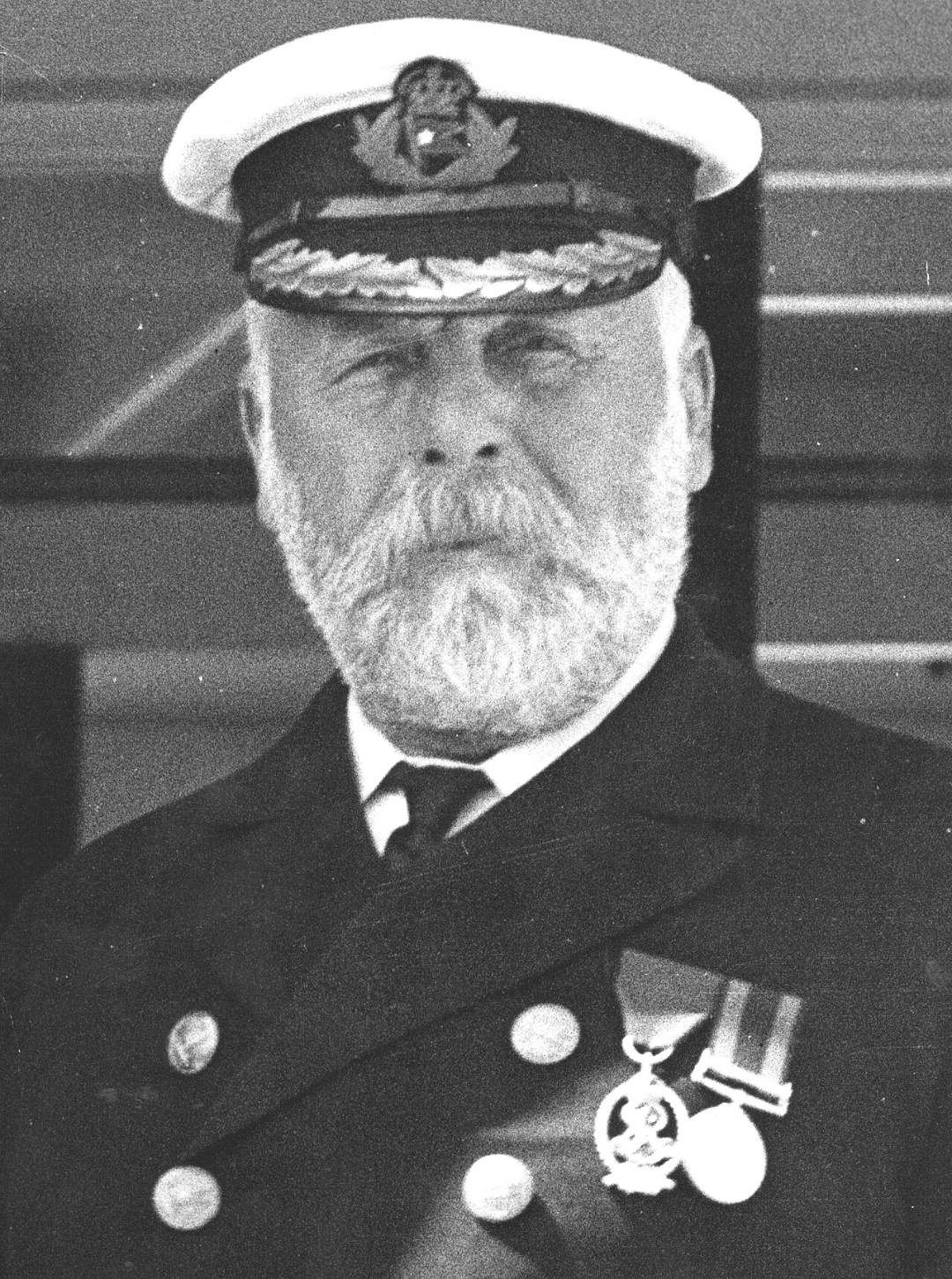
Edward J. Smith, Titanic Captain and also a UK Navy officer

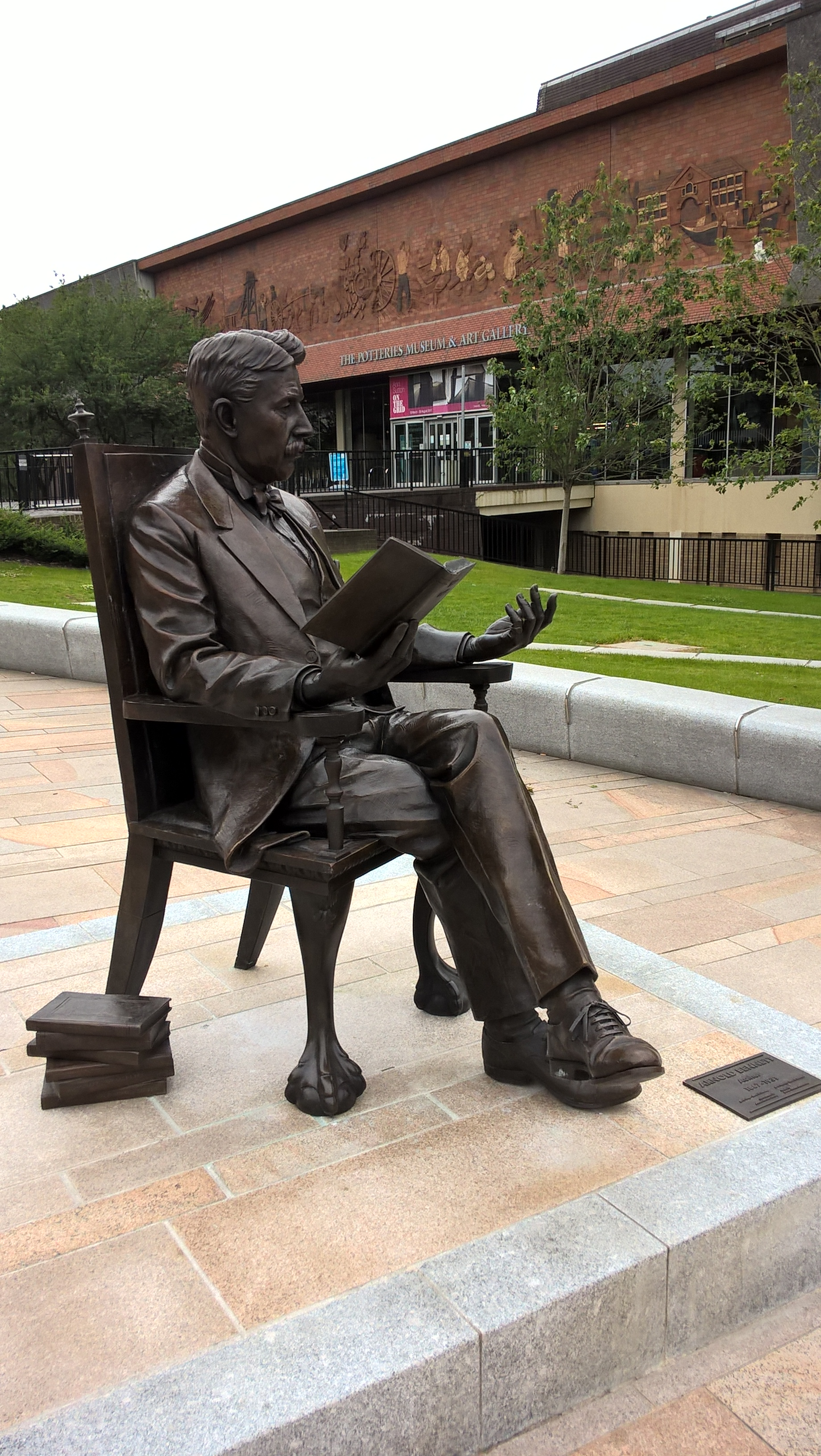
Statue of Arnold Bennett outside the Potteries Museum & Art Gallery in Hanley

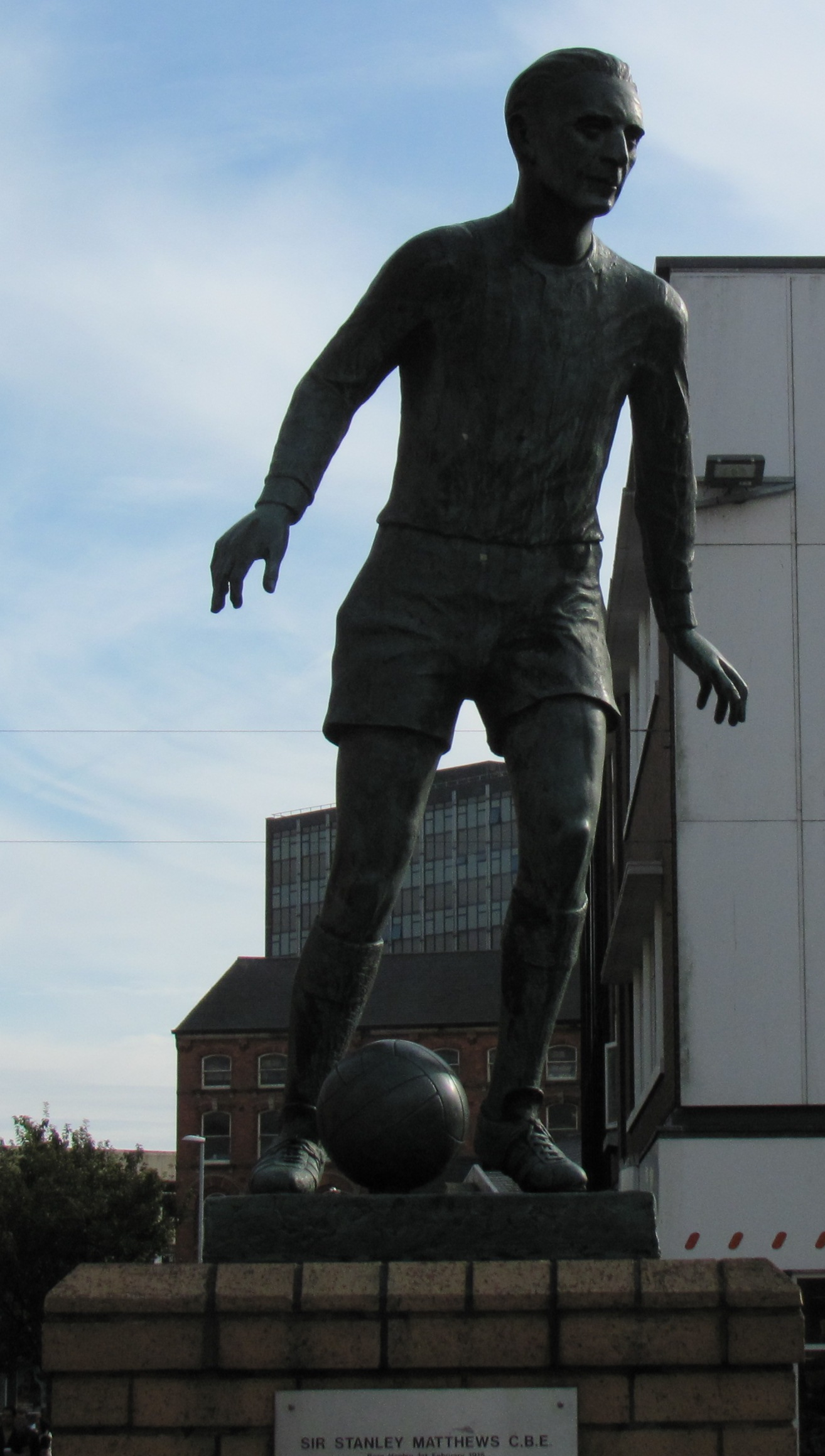
Sir Stanley Matthews statue in the town centre

- Joseph Glass (fl.1670 – 1701 at least), potter, worked in slipware
- Henry Heath (1828–1908), Latter-day Saint (Mormon) pioneer, explorer, settler and lawman in the frontier Utah Territory
- Thomas Twyford (1849–1921), pottery maker, invented the single piece, ceramic flush toilet
- Sarah Benett (1850–1924), Suffragette, member of WSPU, social reformer worked in Hanley
- Edward Smith (1850–1912), Merchant Navy officer, captain of the RMS Titanic, who went down with the ship
- Sir Albert Edward Bowen, 1st Baronet (1858–1924), businessman, spent time in Argentina
- Arnold Bennett (1867–1931), writer and novelist
- John Gilbert Dale (1869–1926), scientist and prominent trade union and political activist
- Eleanor Lodge (1869–1936), academic and sister of Oliver, Richard and Alfred Lodge
- Mabel Mary Spanton (1874–1940), landscape painter, worked in watercolour
- Hilda Ormsby (1877–1973), academic and geographer
- Frederick Hurten Rhead (1880–1942), ceramicist, figure in the Arts and Crafts movement
- Raymond Coxon (1896–1997), artist, had retrospective exhibition at the Potteries Museum & Art Gallery in 1987
- George Henry Evans Hopkins OBE (1898–1973), entomologist
- Hanley Stafford (born Alfred John Austin, 1899–1968), an actor principally on radio.
- Goddard Lieberson (1911–1977), president of Columbia Records 1956–1971 and 1973–1975
- Henry Joseph Gallagher DCM (1914–1988) was awarded the Distinguished Conduct Medal for his gallantry during the Korean War.
- James Bostock (1917–2006), painter, printmaker and wood engraver
- John Forrester (1924–2007), Labour Party politician, MP for Stoke North 1966–1987
- Harold Perkin (1926–2004), social historian and founder of the Social History Society (1976).
- Ken Whitmore (born 1937), author of radio and stage plays, short stories and poetry
- Jeff Kent (born 1951), academic, musician, author and historian.

=== Sport ===
- Bill Rowley (1865–1939), footballer, 124 appearances for Stoke City F.C. as goalkeeper.
- Horace Austerberry (1868–1946), football manager, managed Stoke City F.C. 1897–1908
- Alf Underwood (1869–1928), footballer, played 130 times for Stoke City F.C.
- Tom Holford (1878–1964), footballer, 474 appearances for Stoke City F.C., Manchester City F.C., and Port Vale F.C.
- Arthur Box (1884–1960) footballer who played as a goalkeeper, over 100 appearances for Port Vale F.C., Stoke City F.C. and Birmingham City F.C.
- Sir Stanley Matthews, CBE (1915–2000), footballer, 693 appearances for Stoke City F.C. and Blackpool F.C.
- Les West (born 1943), cyclist
- Terry Alcock, (born 1946), footballer, played 330 league games mainly for Port Vale F.C. and Blackpool F.C.

== See also ==
- Bethesda Methodist Chapel, Hanley
- 1842 Pottery Riots
- Hanley Town F.C.
