= Stoke-on-Trent College =

Coordinates: 53.0148°N 2.1826°W

Location
- Cauldon campus, Stoke Road, Shelton, Stoke on Trent, Staffordshire, ST4 2DG; England

Information
- Type: General Further Education
- Gender: mixed
- Age: 16 to 19
- Enrolment: 17,000
- Website: http://www.stokecoll.ac.uk/

Stoke-on-Trent College is a provider of further and higher education based in Stoke-on-Trent. The college has two campuses: one, called Cauldon Campus, in Shelton and one in Burslem.

Stoke-on-Trent college is part of UniQ, the University Quarter, as part of a collaborative project with Staffordshire University and the Stoke-on-Trent Sixth Form College.

== Education ==
The college runs a range of courses, from basic English and Maths to foundation degree courses. The college has the largest number of higher education students of any college in North Staffordshire.

The college does not offer A-Levels, which are instead the responsibility of City of Stoke-on-Trent Sixth Form College.

The College is a member of the Collab Group of high performing schools.

=== Ofsted ===
The January 2014 Ofsted rating of the college gave it a good overall.

== Sites ==
=== Cauldon ===
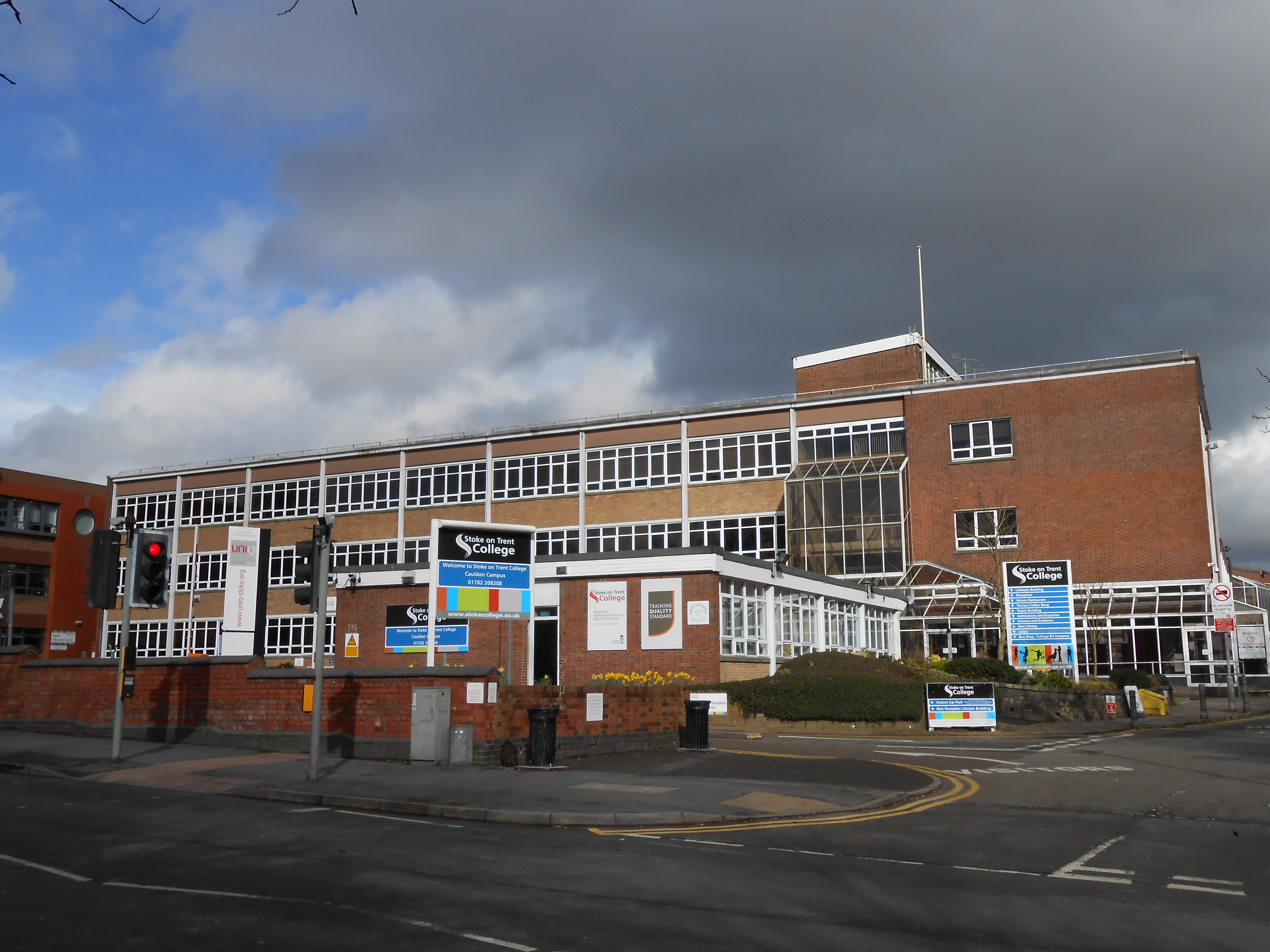
Cauldon Campus

The main site to the college is Cauldon Campus in the Shelton area of the city. This site is where the majority of the courses are run from.

=== Burslem ===
The other site is located on Moorland Road in the Burslem area of the city which contains the sites for Construction, Plumbing, Gas, Motor Vehicle Maintenance as well as Media and Performing Arts. It is also the location of Stoke Studio College which specialises in Manufacturing and Design Engineering and the John Seddon Technology centre. Open and closing times are:

Thursday 8:30am–4:30pm Friday 8:30am–4:30pm Saturday Closed Sunday Closed Monday 8:30am–4:30pm Tuesday 8:30am–4:30pm Wednesday 8:30am–4:30pm

=== Science Centre ===
The Science Centre is a teaching facility that opened in 2012 and run by Staffordshire University and is also used by the Stoke-on-Trent Sixth Form College.

== College Academies Trust ==
Stoke-on-Trent College is the main sponsor of the College Academies Trust, a group of schools within Stoke-on-Trent. Schools in the trust include Discovery Academy, Excel Academy, Maple Court Academy and Stoke Studio College.

== Heatwave Radio ==
In 2013 the college launched its own student radio station called Heatwave Radio which broadcasts from 2 studios within the J Block of Burslem Campus.

The Station is entirely managed by students and presented by lecturers and students and is a member of the Student Radio Association. The station broadcasts a mixture of popular music and specialist programmes in genres such as Dance, Hot AC and unsigned music. The station broadcasts 24 hours per day but for the majority of the time broadcasts non-stop music.
