= Ormiston Sir Stanley Matthews Academy =

Location
- Beaconsfield Drive, Blurton; Stoke-on-Trent, Staffordshire, ST3 3JD; England
- Coordinates: 52.97401°N 2.16436°W

Information
- Type: Academy
- Established: 2010
- Local authority: Stoke-on-Trent
- Department for Education URN: 136145 Tables
- Ofsted: Reports
- Principal: Kelly Hassall
- Gender: Coeducational
- Age: 11 to 16
- Website: ormistonsirstanleymatthewsacademy.co.uk

Ormiston Sir Stanley Matthews Academy, a.k.a. OSSMA (formerly Blurton High School) is a mixed secondary school with academy status located in the Blurton area of Stoke on Trent Staffordshire, England. The school is named after the English footballer Sir Stanley Matthews and is sponsored by Ormiston Academies Trust.

Established in 2010, OSSMA was one of the first schools in Stoke-on-Trent to gain academy status and in January 2013 moved into a brand new building.

Ormiston Sir Stanley Matthews Academy was officially opened in May 2014 by the Duke of Gloucester.

== Feeder schools ==
- Christchurch CE Primary School
- Glebe Primary School
- Heron Cross Primary School
- Newstead Primary School
- The Meadows Primary Academy
- Sutherland Primary School
