= St Thomas More Catholic Academy =

Location
- Longton Hall Road; Longton, Stoke-on-Trent, Staffordshire; ST3 2NJ; England; 52.9879°N 2.14783°W

Information
- Type: Academy
- Motto: Aspire to be More
- Religious affiliation: Roman Catholic
- Established: 1980
- Local authority: Stoke-on-Trent
- Department for Education URN: 140304 Tables
- Ofsted: Reports
- Headteacher: Mark Rayner
- Gender: Mixed
- Age: 11 to 18
- Enrolment: 1,119 As Of May 2026 which 120 on roll in the sixth form
- Houses: 7 each representing a different Saint
- Website: www.stmca.org.uk

St Thomas More Catholic Academy is a mixed secondary school and sixth form located in the Longton area of Stoke-on-Trent in the English county of Staffordshire. The school is named after Saint Thomas More, a sixteenth century elder statesman who was killed for his refusal to accept King Henry VIII's claim to be the supreme head of the church.

First established in 1980 as a voluntary aided upper school for pupils aged 12 to 18, in 1983 St Thomas More became a secondary school for pupils aged 11 to 18. The school gained a specialism in Maths and Computing in 2004 and became a Training school in 2009. In 2013 the school relocated to a new building and converted to academy status, sponsored by the Roman Catholic Archdiocese of Birmingham.

St Thomas More Catholic Academy offers GCSEs and BTECs as programmes of study for pupils, while students in the sixth form have the option to study from a range of A-levels and further BTECs. The sixth form provision is offered as the Trinity Sixth Form, a collaboration between St Thomas More Catholic Academy, St John Fisher Catholic College, and St Margaret Ward Catholic Academy.
