= St Margaret Ward Catholic Academy =

Location
- Little Chell Lane; Tunstall; Stoke-on-Trent, Staffordshire, ST6 6LZ; England; 53.06787°N 2.19674°W

Information
- Type: Academy
- Religious affiliation: Roman Catholic
- Established: 1957
- Founders: The Roman Catholic Archdiocese of Birmingham And Stoke-on-Trent City Council
- Local authority: Stoke-on-Trent
- Department for Education URN: 140149 Tables
- Ofsted: Reports
- Principal: D McKenna
- Gender: Mixed
- Age: 11 to 18
- Enrolment: 1,134 as of September 2021 Of which 132 on roll in the sixth form
- Capacity: 1,200
- Website: http://www.stmargaretward.co.uk/

St Margaret Ward Catholic Academy is a mixed secondary school and sixth form located in the Tunstall area of Stoke-on-Trent in the English county of Staffordshire. The school is named after Saint Margaret Ward, a Roman Catholic martyr who was executed during the reign of Elizabeth I for assisting a priest to escape from prison.

Blessed William Southern Roman Catholic County Secondary School was established in 1957 and was renamed St Margaret Ward's Catholic School in 1980. In September 2013 St Margaret Ward Catholic School converted to academy status and was renamed St Margaret Ward Catholic Academy. The school is now part of the Newman Catholic Collegiate, a Multi Academy Trust sponsored by the Roman Catholic Archdiocese of Birmingham.

St Margaret Ward Catholic Academy offers GCSEs and BTECs as programmes of study for pupils, while students in the sixth form have the option to study from a range of A-levels and further BTECs. The sixth form provision is offered as the Trinity Sixth Form, a collaboration between St Margaret Ward Catholic Academy, St John Fisher Catholic College and St Thomas More Catholic Academy.

== Notable former pupils ==
- Robbie Williams (b. 1974) - singer, songwriter, and actor
- Mahek Bukhari (b. 1999) - social media influencer
