= Ormiston Horizon Academy =

- The current logo used since 2011

Location
- Turnhurst Road; Chell, Stoke-on-Trent, Staffordshire, ST6 6JZ; England

Information
- Type: secondary academy
- Motto: Respect, Resilience, Responsibility
- Local authority: Stoke-on-Trent
- Department for Education URN: 136680 Tables
- Ofsted: Reports
- Principal: Claire Stanyer (As of November 2026)
- Gender: co-educational
- Age: 11 to 16
- Houses: Neptune, Tellus, Vulcan and Apollo (as of September 2023)
- Colours: Red, Green, Blue & Yellow
- Sponsor: Ormiston Academies Trust
- Website: Ormiston Horizon Academy

Ormiston Horizon Academy, formerly known as James Brindley High School/James Brindley Science College, is an 11–16 co-educational secondary academy school in Chell, Stoke-on-Trent, Staffordshire. The school also had a sixth-form for young people aged 16–18, which closed in 2019.

== History ==
Until September 2011, the school was known as James Brindley Science College. In 2011 it became an academy as part of the Ormiston Academies Trust.

The school was the first academy in the country to set up a new sixth form, in 2013. Although as these student finish A-levels, the sixth form is being disbanded.

== New building ==
The previous buildings were in a state of disrepair and a new building was built on the site of an old hospital. This was opened in 2013 and provides space for more pupils, including post-16.

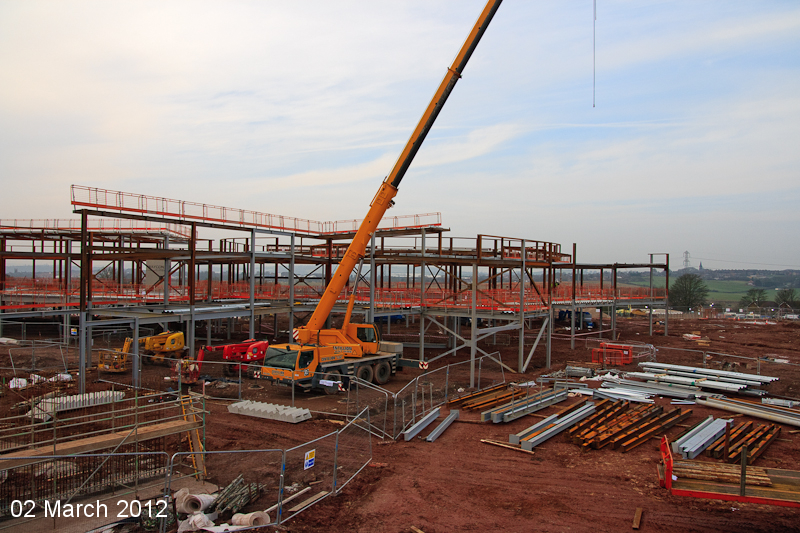
Construction of the new academy building as of March 2012

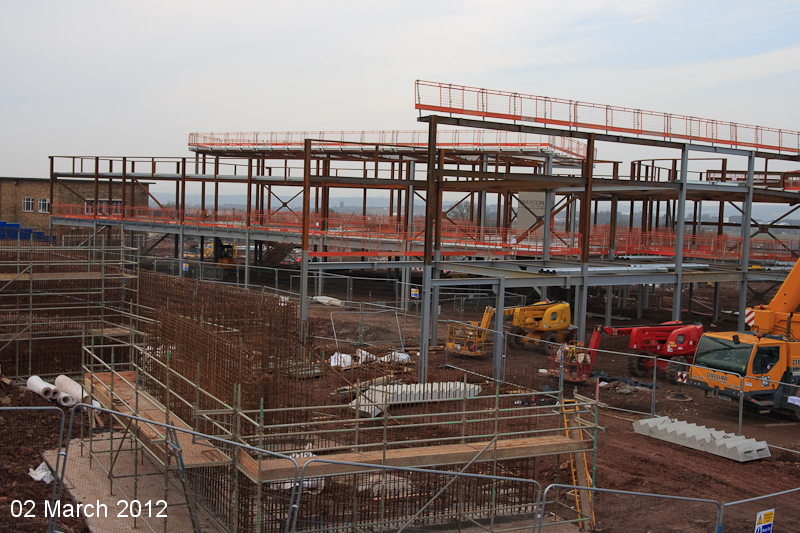
Construction of the new academy building as of March 2012
