= Abbey Hill Academy =

Abbey Hill Academy and College

Location
- Box Lane, Meir; Stoke-on-Trent, Staffordshire, ST3 5PR; England
- Coordinates: 53.03251°N 2.13255°W

Information
- Type: Special school; Academy
- Local authority: Stoke-on-Trent
- Department for Education URN: 149990 Tables
- Ofsted: Reports
- Headteacher: Ricky Porter
- Gender: Coeducational
- Age: 3 to 19
- Enrolment: 355 as of October 2023
- Website: www.abbeyhillschool.co.uk

Abbey Hill Academy and College (formerly Abbey Hill School)' is a special school located in Stoke-on-Trent, Staffordshire, England.

The school was previously awarded specialist status as a SEN and Arts College. Formerly a foundation school administered by Stoke-on-Trent City Council, in November 2023 Abbey Hill School converted to academy status and was renamed Abbey Hill Academy and College. The school is now sponsored by the St Bart's Multi Academy Trust.

The school comprises an upper school, a lower school and a special autistic school for challenged children. Upper school students must take on community service as part of their education. Age ranges from preschool to eighteen years for the students.

Since autistic children require a very structured environment, the school has set aside half of the schools for smaller, individual classes. Age ranges from preschool to sixteen years for the students.
