= List of schools in Halton =

This is a list of schools in the Borough of Halton in Cheshire, England.

== State-funded schools ==
=== Primary schools ===
- All Saints Upton CE Primary School, Widnes
- Astmoor Primary School, Astmoor
- Beechwood Primary School, Beechwood
- Bridgewater Park Primary School, Runcorn
- Brookvale Primary School, Runcorn
- The Brow Community Primary School, Halton
- Castle View Primary School, Halton
- Daresbury Primary School, Daresbury
- Ditton Primary School, Ditton
- Fairfield Primary School, Widnes
- Farnworth CE Primary School, Widnes
- Gorsewood Primary School, Runcorn
- The Grange Academy, Runcorn
- Hale CE Primary School, Hale Village
- Halebank CE Primary School, Halebank
- Hallwood Park Primary School and Nursery, Runcorn
- Halton Lodge Primary School, Halton
- Hillview Primary School, Beechwood
- The Holy Spirit RC Primary School, Halton
- Kingsway Primary Academy, Widnes
- Lunts Heath Primary School, Widnes
- Moore Primary School, Moore
- Moorfield Primary School, Widnes
- Murdishaw West Community Primary School, Runcorn
- Oakfield Community Primary School, Widnes
- Our Lady Mother of the Saviour RC Primary School, Runcorn
- Our Lady of Perpetual Succour RC Primary School, Widnes
- Palace Fields Primary Academy, Runcorn
- Pewithall Primary School, Runcorn
- Runcorn All Saints CE Primary School, Runcorn
- St Augustine's RC Primary School, Runcorn
- St Basil's RC Primary School, Hough Green
- St Bede's Catholic Infant School, Widnes
- St Bede's Catholic Junior School, Widnes
- St Berteline's CE Primary School, Norton
- St Clement's RC Primary School, Runcorn
- St Edward's RC Primary School, Runcorn
- St Gerard's RC Primary and Nursery School, Widnes
- St John Fisher Catholic Primary School, Widnes
- St Martin's RC Primary School, Runcorn
- St Mary's CE Primary School, Runcorn
- St Michael with St Thomas CE Primary School, Hough Green
- St Michael's RC Primary School, Widnes
- Victoria Road Primary School, Runcorn
- Westfield Primary School, Runcorn
- Weston Point Community Primary School, Runcorn
- Weston Primary School, Weston
- Widnes Academy, Widnes
- Windmill Hill Primary School, Runcorn
- Woodside Primary School, Runcorn

=== Secondary schools ===
- Blessed Carlo Acutis Catholic and Church of England Academy, Runcorn
- The Grange Academy, Runcorn
- The Heath School, Runcorn
- Ormiston Bolingbroke Academy, Runcorn
- Ormiston Chadwick Academy, Widnes
- Saints Peter and Paul Catholic High School, Widnes
- Sandymoor Ormiston Academy, Runcorn
- Wade Deacon High School, Widnes

=== Special and alternative schools ===
- Ashley High School, Widnes
- The Bridge School, Astmoor
- Brookfields School, Widnes
- The Cavendish High Academy, Runcorn
- Chesnut Lodge Special School, Ditton

=== Further education ===
- Riverside College, Halton

== Independent schools ==
=== Special and alternative schools ===
- Halton School, Halton
- Hope Corner School, Runcorn
- Poppy Field School, Halton
- Weston Point College, Runcorn

== Performance table ==
This table shows the percentage of pupils gaining five GCSE A*–C level grades, including English and Maths, in the years 2005–2008 compared with the local and national averages.

School	Number on roll 2008/9	2005	2006	2007	2008	2009
The Bankfield School	171	25	29	33	50	38
Fairfield High School	171	27	33	37	50	41
The Grange Comprehensive School	202	27	24	27	35	37
Ormiston Bolingbroke Academy	90	19	22	24	18	21
The Heath School	57	44	42	50	63	53
St Chad's Catholic and Church of England High School	163	40	49	53	67	79
Saints Peter and Paul Catholic Sports College	275	32	31	48	48	40
Wade Deacon High School	219	55	53	67	78	72
Halton average		32.8	33.3	41.0	49.2	45.6
National average		44.3	45.3	46.0	47.3	49.8

== Ofsted reports ==
The key for the inspection grades in the table are: Grade 1 Outstanding: Grade 2 Good: Grade 3 Satisfactory: Grade 4 Inadequate

School	Date	Number on Roll	Overall effectiveness	Achievement & Standards	Personal development	Teaching & Learning	Curriculum	Care	Leadership & Management	Ref
The Bankfield School	24–25 January 2007	867	2	2	2	2	2	1	2	
Fairfield High School	2–3 March 2006	868	3	3	3	3	2	3	3	
Grange Comprehensive School	5–6 July 2007	1080	3	3	2	3	3	3	3	
Ormiston Bolingbroke Academy	5–6 December 2005	556	3	3	3	2	2	1	2	
The Heath School	21 November 2007	1048	2	2	1	2	1	1	1	
St Chad's Catholic High School	21 September 2010	920	1	1	1	1	2	1	1	
Saints Peter and Paul Catholic Sports College	20–21 January 2010	1605	2	2	2	1	2	1	1	
Wade Deacon High School	14 March 2007	1128	2	2	1	2	2	1	1	
