= Ormiston (disambiguation) =

Ormiston is a village in East Lothian, Scotland.

Ormiston may also refer to:

== Places ==
- Ormiston, New Zealand, is a suburb of Auckland also known as Flat Bush
- Ormiston, Queensland, Australia
- Ormiston, Saskatchewan, Canada
- Ormiston, Scottish Borders, a location
- Ormiston (District Electoral Area), Belfast, Northern Ireland
- Ormiston Creek flows into the Finke River in the Northern Territory, Australia

== Other uses ==
- Ormiston (surname)
- Ormiston F.C., a football (soccer) club in Ormiston, East Lothian, Scotland
- Ormiston Trust, a charitable trust based in London, England

== Schools ==
- Ormiston Bolingbroke Academy, a secondary school in Runcorn, England
- Ormiston Denes Academy, a secondary school in Suffolk, England
- Ormiston Forge Academy, a secondary school in West Midlands, England
- Ormiston Horizon Academy, a secondary school in Stoke-on-Trent, England
- Ormiston Ilkeston Enterprise Academy, a secondary school in Derbyshire, England
