= Ilkeston Grammar School =

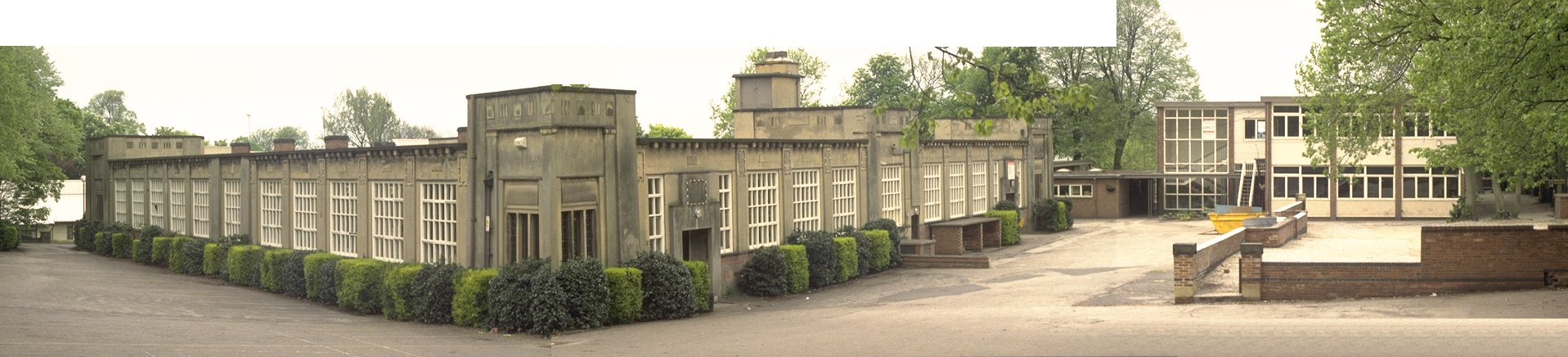

Location
- King George Avenue; Ilkeston, Derbyshire, DE7; England
- Coordinates: 52.971558°N 1.316294°W

Information
- Type: grammar school
- Motto: Labor omnia vincit "Labour conquers all things".
- Established: 1914 (county secondary)
- Closed: 1977 (comprehensive)
- Local authority: Derbyshire County Council
- Gender: mixed
- Age: 11 (at end) to 16 (at end)
- Enrolment: 1500
- Houses: Newdigate, Manners, Mundy, Cantelupe
- Colours: Red and blue

Ilkeston Grammar School was a selective co-educational secondary school, admission being dependent on passing the 11-plus examination. It stood on King George Avenue, Ilkeston, in the south east of Derbyshire in the East Midlands of England.

The photograph in the infobox shows the original school, now known as the 'King George Building' of Ormiston Ilkeston Enterprise Academy, seen from the junction of King George Avenue and Scarborough Avenue, c.2002.

== History ==
=== Origins ===
What became Ilkeston Grammar School was established as a pupil teacher centre whose main claim to fame was that author D. H. Lawrence studied there. This centre became inadequate for Ilkeston's needs, and eventually a site for its replacement was purchased from the Duke of Rutland in December 1913.

The new Ilkeston County Secondary School (capacity – 250 pupils) was opened on 25 June 1914 by King George V when he visited the town accompanied by Queen Mary. The King pressed a button whilst standing in the market place which opened the school gates (a good half-mile away and well out of sight), an explosive charge relaying the success of the operation back to the assembled crowds in the town centre. The King did, though, pass by in his car on his way out of the town and had a few words with the headmaster.

=== County secondary school ===
The outbreak of the First World War just two months later meant the loss of several male staff, so that by 1918 there was only one other male teacher apart from the headmaster. A change of head in 1919 brought a change in discipline; before this, corporal punishment had not been used but the new headmaster, Samuel R. Wood, introduced caning with vigour. He is remembered as 'a stern headmaster of little humour' but the school's record of academic achievement greatly improved.

=== The grammar school years ===
After the Education Act 1944 the county secondary became Ilkeston Grammar School in that year and Mr Wood retired in 1946. By 1947 there were 422 pupils, still strictly segregated with their separate playgrounds and separate boys' and girls' school entrances on Scarborough Avenue. Trespassing into the 'other' playground was usually punished with a caning.

In 1955, the school bought 'West Knoll', a builder's house adjoining the school at the end of Scarborough Avenue, which provided office and teaching space along with some useful grounds.

=== D. R. J. Cox ===
In November 1961, Mr David R. J. Cox became headmaster – known to generations of former pupils as 'Doc Cox'. Mr Cox had been involved in education in Egypt and the Sudan, and his gentlemanly but authoritative air and good manners earned him much respect. Very much in the 'old school' mould, he once said

'We hear about sex ad nauseam. Anyone would think it was only discovered last year ... so far as I know, early man evolved without the benefit of constant sex education, films about growing up ... and the dubious luxury of pornography, and what is more, I am sure they were not under the impression that they owed their existence to the services of a kindly stork'

Mr Cox stayed as headmaster until 1978.

In the early 1970s, talk of the school turning comprehensive grew stronger, against the wishes of some of the teaching establishment. Headmaster Mr Cox's last famous speech was headlined "comprehensive is the con-trick of the century".

=== The end for the grammar school ===
Ilkeston Grammar School was renamed Ilkeston School in 1977 when it became a comprehensive, the last intake from the 11-plus examination being admitted in September 1976.

Ilkeston's other secondary schools, Hallcroft Girls' School and Hallcroft Boys' School, had already merged in 1960 to form Hallcroft School. Hallcroft, Gladstone and Cavendish merged in 1976 to form the comprehensive Cantelupe School. Cantelupe closed in 1997, its pupils moving to the newly re-organised Ilkeston School].

The school converted to academy status in 2011, and is now known as Ormiston Ilkeston Enterprise Academy.

== Architecture ==
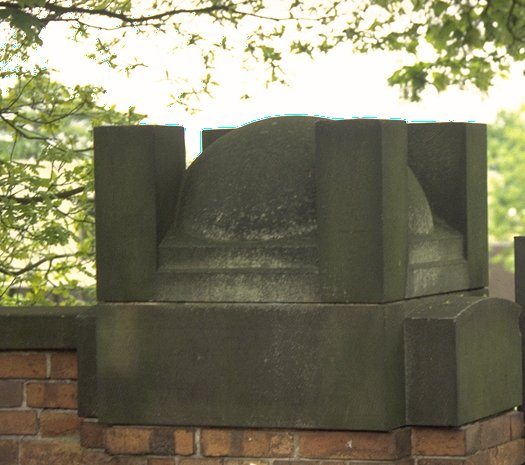
Gate post detail c. 2001.

The original, core buildings have an unusual layout that consist of

"classrooms round an open quadrangle with a central domed hall"

according to Pevsner. This oldest part of the school was designed by County Architect Mr Widdows, who saw it as resembling 'an eastern fortress'. This design was echoed by the tops of the main entrance gateposts.

The original design is also reminiscent of Moorish architecture in that it is based around a quadrangle with a central domed hall. The buildings are decorated with simple geometric patterns on the external walls, also in the Moorish style. Exciting much comment at the time, the design was only a qualified success. There was no gymnasium or canteen, the cloakroom facilities were poor, and there were no showers.

This design also closely resembles that of the "Main Block" at New Mills School Business & Enterprise College in New Mills, High Peak, also designed by Widdows. Aerial views (see Google Earth) show a virtually identical ground plan, though New Mills has pitched roofs with dormer windows. Further examples of the work of Widdows can be found across Derbyshire, including the former Heanor Grammar School.

Mr Ripley, a former deputy headmaster commented

"To work in this school, one finds it is sunny, airy and pleasant in summer and fine weather but most uncomfortable in winter when driving rain and sleet can chill everyone who has to change from one room to another throughout the school day".

Since 1986, it has been a Grade II* Listed Building.

Although many temporary classrooms (some of which lasted for over fifty years) were erected, the first new permanent classrooms were added in 1956 for geography and history, extended in 1959 with an impressive new two-storey 'science block' with a full length glazed staircase. More 'temporary' terrapin prefabricated classrooms were added in the late 1960s and 1970s.

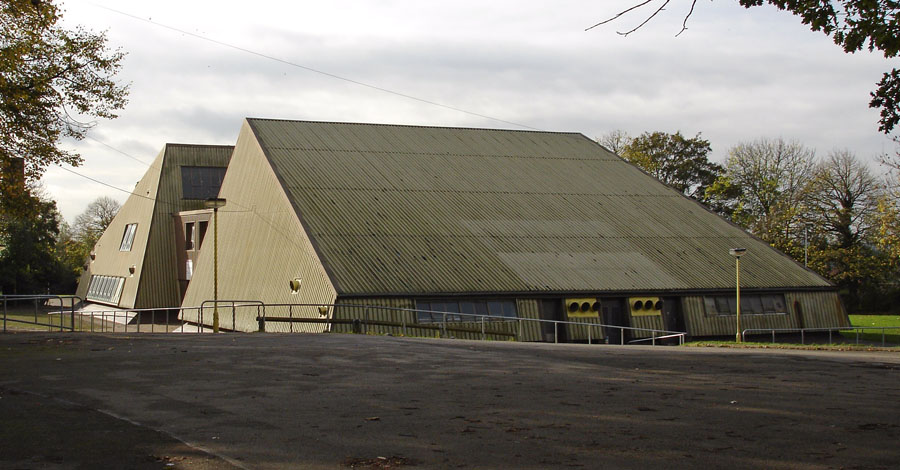
The much criticised 'Pyramid Building'

The steel-framed 'pyramids' building (erected in two stages between 1977 and 1979). with its unplastered internal block walls and outside plastic cladding, though controversial, at least provided the school with its first purpose-built gymnasium and changing rooms. The second stage had much improved facilities for art, metalwork and woodwork. The art rooms occasionally flooded as some windows had been installed the wrong way up. A later county architect, put to work on attempting an extension, said it was

'the wrong shape, the wrong size, built of the wrong materials and placed on the wrong site'

The pyramid building was demolished in February 2014 to make way for a new building which will be finished at the start of 2015.

== Exchange programmes ==
In the 1960s and 1970s there was a pupil exchange programme with the Lycée de Montgeron (near Paris). There is currently an exchange programme with schools in Toyota, Japan.

== Headteachers ==
Headmasters and headmistresses of Ilkeston County Secondary School and Ilkeston Grammar School

1913–1919	Mr F. P. C. Walker, MA
1919–1946	Mr S. R. Wood
1946–1950	Mr P. M. Jackson
1951–1954	Mr S. F. Marshall
1954–1961	Mr J. N. Hewitson
1961–1978	Mr D. R. J. Cox, MA
1979–1986	Mr L. J. Elwell
c1985–c1988	Mr J. Jordan (acting)
1987–2002	Mr M. Burdon
2003–2011	Mr S. Daniels
2011–2012	Mrs T. Dundas
2012–2016	Mr D Smith
2016–2022	Miss N Salt
2022–2023	Mr S Glover
2023–present	Mr S Leach

== Notable former pupils ==
- Prof Raymond Baker CBE (born 1936), Chief Executive of the Biotechnology and Biological Sciences Research Council from 1996 to 2001, and Director of the Wolfson Unit of Chemical Entomology at the University of Southampton from 1976 to 1984
- Sir Robertson King CBE (1895–1976), Chairman of the East Midlands Electricity Board from 1948 to 1957, of the Electricity Council from 1959 to 1961, and of the National Inspection Council for Electrical Installation Contracting from 1956 to 1958
- Stuart Palmer (born 1943), Professor of Experimental Physics since 1987 at the University of Warwick
- George Sayles (1901–94), Professor of History at the University of Aberdeen from 1953 to 1962
- Robert Holmes FRGS (born 1943) Photographer, author and adventurer Member of the RGS 150th Anniversary expedition to the Karakoram Fellow of the Explorers Club of New York
- Allan Torr (1965– ) Her Majesty's Inspector of schools from 2006 to 2017.

== See also ==
- Grade II* listed buildings in Erewash
- Listed buildings in Ilkeston
