= Erewash =

Erewash may refer to:

- Borough of Erewash, a local government district in the county of Derbyshire, England
- Erewash Valley, is the valley of the River Erewash
- River Erewash, river in England
- Erewash (UK Parliament constituency), Derbyshire constituency in the British House of Commons
- Erewash Canal, broad canal in Derbyshire
- Erewash Valley line, a branch line from Chesterfield to Long Eaton
- Erewash Museum, Ilkeston
- Erewash Sound, is a community radio station broadcasting to the borough of Erewash
