= Listed buildings in Ilkeston =

Ilkeston is a town in the Borough of Erewash in Derbyshire, England. The town and surrounding area contain 29 listed buildings that are recorded in the National Heritage List for England. Of these, one is listed at Grade I, the highest of the three grades, three are at Grade II*, the middle grade, and the others are at Grade II, the lowest grade. The Erewash Canal passes through the area, and the listed buildings associated with it are two bridges and two locks. The other listed buildings include churches and a chapel, a church tower, houses, a museum, the town hall, two factories, a drinking fountain, a brick kiln, a library, cemetery buildings, two cinemas, a school, a railway viaduct, and two war memorials.

== Key ==
| Grade | Criteria |
|---|---|
| I | Buildings of exceptional interest, sometimes considered to be internationally important |
| II* | Particularly important buildings of more than special interest |
| II | Buildings of national importance and special interest |

== Buildings ==
| Name and location | Photograph | Date | Notes | Grade |
|---|---|---|---|---|
| St Mary's Church, Ilkeston; 52.97100°N 1.30829°W | | Early 13th century | The church has been altered and extended through the centuries, including a restoration in 1853–55, and an extension in 1909–10. The church is built in sandstone with tile roofs, and consists of a nave, north and south aisles, a chancel with a north chapel and south vestries, and a west tower partly embraced by the aisles. The tower has three stages, chamfered string courses, clasping buttresses, a west doorway, lancet windows, and a clock face. Above the bell stage is a trefoil corbel table, and a panelled parapet with eight pinnacles. | II* |
| All Saints' Church, Kirk Hallam; 52.96039°N 1.31876°W | | 14th century | The church has been altered during the centuries, and was restored in 1859 by G. E. Street, who also added the porch. The church is built in gritstone with Welsh slate roofs, and consists of a nave a south porch, a chancel, and a west tower. The tower has a west window of two cusp-arched lights in a chamfered surround, and the bell openings are similar. At the top is a moulded string course and an embattled parapet, and along the nave is a coped parapet. Set into the porch are two 12th-century beakheads. | I |
| The Hall and the Old Hall; 52.96116°N 1.31160°W | | 16th century | The Hall was added in the 18th century. The Old Hall is timber framed with brick infill and a tile roof. There are two storeys and three bays, and the windows are casements and horizontally-sliding sashes. The Hall is in brick and has a tile roof with a coped gable and plain kneelers. There are three storeys and an L-shaped plan, with a main range of three bays and a single-storey range to the south. It has dentilled floor bands, and a dentilled eaves cornice. The windows are sashes with wedge brick lintels. | II |
| The Gables; 52.96027°N 1.30961°W | — | Early 18th century | A red brick house with dentilled bands, a dentilled eaves cornice, and a tile roof with coped gables and plain kneelers. There are three storeys, a south front of three bays, a lower two-storey bay to the right, and single-storey lean-tos. On the front is a full height gabled porch and a segmental-headed doorway, and the windows are casements. The west front has two gabled bays and cross windows, and on the east front is a twin-gabled projection. | II |
| 4 and 5 East Street; 52.97196°N 1.30798°W | | 18th century | A house, later used for other purposes, in rendered brick, and a tile roof with coped gables and plain kneelers. There are three storeys and three bays. The main doorway has pilasters and a rectangular fanlight, and there is a smaller doorway to the left with a plain surround. The windows are sashes in moulded architraves. | II |
| Erewash Museum; 52.97153°N 1.30712°W | | Late 18th century | Originally a house, Dalby House, later a museum, it is in red brick with painted stone dressings, sill bands, a dentilled eaves cornice, and a Welsh slate roof. There are three storeys and three bays. The ground floor projects, it has a parapet and railings, and contain four segmental-headed sash windows. In the middle bay of each upper floor is a blind round-arched window with a keystone. The outer bays of the middle floor contain Venetian windows, and in the top floor are Diocletian windows, all with keystones. | II |
| Greens Lock; 52.96708°N 1.29147°W | | 1779 | The lock on the Erewash Canal is in gritstone and red brick, and partly rebuilt in engineering brick and concrete. The gates are in timber and iron. The side walls have gritstone copings, and on each side are iron steps with railings. To the side of each gate is a concrete semicircle with foot grips, and the leat runs to the west of the lock. | II |
| Hallam Fields Bridge; 52.95105°N 1.28728°W | | 1779 | The footbridge crosses the Erewash Canal, it is in gritstone and red brick, and has repairs in brick and concrete. It consists of a single segmental arch, the walls ramped up towards the centre, and curving slightly to end piers. | II |
| Hallam Fields Lock; 52.95126°N 1.28736°W | | 1779 | The lock on the Erewash Canal is in gritstone and red brick, and partly rebuilt in engineering brick and concrete. The gates are in timber and iron. The side walls are coped, and on each side are iron steps with railings. To the side of each gate is a concrete semicircle with foot grips, and the leat runs to the west of the lock. | II |
| Potters Lock; 52.97071°N 1.29293°W | | 1779 | The lock on the Erewash Canal is in gritstone and red brick, and partly rebuilt in engineering brick and concrete. The gates are in timber and iron. The side walls are coped, and on each side are iron steps. To the side of each gate is a concrete semicircle with foot grips, and the leat runs to the south of the lock. | II |
| Potters Lock Bridge; 52.97063°N 1.29265°W | | 1779 | The footbridge crosses the Erewash Canal, it is in gritstone and red brick. It consists of a single segmental arch, the walls ramped up towards the centre, and curving slightly to end piers. | II |
| Former Nazarene Church; 52.96835°N 1.30805°W | | 1784 | The former church is in red brick, rendered on the west front, with a Welsh slate roof. The west front has two storeys, three bays and a pedimented gable containing the date. In the centre is a gabled porch, and a doorway with an impost band and a moulded hood mould. The windows are small-pane casements with segmental heads. | II |
| Bailey's Factory; 52.97878°N 1.31007°W | | 1830s (possibly) | Originally a lace and hosiery factory, the building dates mainly from 1855. It is in red brick with gritstone dressings, quoins, a sill band, and a hipped tile roof. There are four storeys and a south front of 13 bays, the middle three bays projecting with a dentilled pediment. In the centre is a rusticated round-arched doorway with a keystone, and the windows are sashes. Attached to the west is a range with three storeys and four bays. | II |
| Factory of Ball and Son; 52.97366°N 1.30675°W | | 1843 | The lace factory is in red brick on a chamfered plinth and a Welsh slate roof. Three are four storeys and nine bays, divided by plaster strips with chamfered angles. The middle three bays project under a pedimented gable containing a clock face. The doorways have rectangular fanlights, and the windows have cast iron frames with opening centre lights. | II |
| Baptist Chapel; 52.96947°N 1.31011°W | | 1858 | The church is in red brick with chamfered stone sills and a Welsh slate roof, hipped to the east, where the church has a semicircular end. On each side are six round-arched windows in recessed round-arched panels. To the west is a single-storey projecting room with a doorway and sash windows. On the east is a projecting porch with three bays, pilasters, and panels with a dentilled frieze. In the centre is a round-arched doorway flanked by windows, all with keystones, and above is an inscribed plaque. | II |
| Ilkeston Town Hall; 52.97080°N 1.30970°W | | 1866–68 | The town hall is in red brick with dressings in sandstone and blue and yellow brick, and has rustication and quoins, a moulded cornice between the floors, a balustraded parapet with urns, and a Welsh slate roof. There are two storeys and five bays, the middle three bays projecting. In the centre is a recessed porch with a round arch, and the windows have round heads, all with keystones, moulded impost bands, and moulded hood moulds; three arches have polychromatic brickwork. Above the doorway is a balcony on carved brackets with an openwork balustrade and ball finials. | II |
| Bennerley Viaduct; 52.98966°N 1.29766°W | | 1877 | The viaduct was built by the Great Northern Railway to carry its Derbyshire and Staffordshire extension over the valley of the River Erewash, and is now disused. The viaduct is a lattice truss bridge in wrought iron, consisting of 16 lattice deck spans on 15 latticework piers. These have foundations in concrete, blue brick and stone, and at the ends are support structures in brick. The viaduct is 433 metres (1,421 ft) long, and over 18 metres (59 ft) above the river. | II* |
| Drinking Fountain; 52.97100°N 1.30942°W | | 1889 | The drinking fountain, horse trough, and lamp standard are in cast iron on a stone base. On the west side are steps, the horse trough is on the other three sides, with two statues of putti holding urns. The centre is hexagonal, with colonnettes at the angles, and a spouting face in a Gothic arch. It is surmounted by a lamp standard with a twisted column. | II |
| Tower, St Bartholomew's Church; 52.95255°N 1.29234°W | | 1895 | The tower is in red brick with gritstone dressings, it is square and tapering, with four stages and three chamfered string courses, and a saddleback pantile roof. In the south front is a segmental-arched doorway, and the east and west fronts have tall lancet windows. The third stage contains broad pilaster strips and circular clock faces, and in the top stage are small round-arched bell openings with a decorative machicolation-like motif above. The body of the church has been altered and used for other purposes. | II |
| Brick kiln 52.96558°N 1.31620°W | | 1900–13 | The Hoffmann kiln at the former brickworks is in pink brick with a corrugated iron roof. It has a rectangular plan with rounded ends, and two tiers of openings. The lower tier has 14 round-headed entrances, and in the upper tier are ten square openings. | II |
| Carnegie Free Library; 52.97020°N 1.30893°W | | 1904 | The library is in orange brick and stone, with sandstone dressings, on a chamfered rusticated plinth, with two storeys and a basement. The north front has a central round-arched doorway with a moulded surround and a keystone, flanked by Tuscan columns, and a round-arched hood, above which is an inscribed plaque. In the upper floor are five windows and carved relief Art Nouveau panels. This flanked by two-storey canted bay windows containing Ionic half-columns. | II |
| United Reformed Church and Rooms; 52.97026°N 1.31103°W | | 1905 | The church is in red brick with stone dressings and a tile roof. It consists of a nave with a clerestory, north and south aisles, north and south transepts, a chancel, a northwest tower, a west porch, and parish rooms attached at the southeast corner. The tower has set back buttresses, the bell openings are in Venetian window-style, above which is an embattled parapet with pinnacles, and a slim copper spire. The parish rooms have an L-shaped plan and a canted end. | II |
| Cemetery Chapels, Park Cemetery; 52.97069°N 1.30150°W | | 1910 | The chapels are in gritstone with limestone dressings and Welsh slate roofs. Between the chapels is a carriageway with a pointed chamfered arch with buttresses. Over this are two-light bell openings, a quatrefoil frieze and four crocketed pinnacles, surmounted by a hexagonal spire with a band of quatrefoils. The chapels are gabled with large five-light windows. | II |
| Gate piers, walls and railings, Park Cemetery; 52.97047°N 1.30150°W | | 1910 | At the entrance to the cemetery are eight square stone gate piers. Each pier has a chamfered base, angle colonnettes and gablets, and a pyramidal cap. They are linked by low stone walls with elaborate cast iron railings. | II |
| Scala Cinema; 52.97133°N 1.30987°W | | 1913 | The body of the cinema is in brick, the front is in painted terracotta, and the roof is in Welsh slate. The front has three bays, the central bay with a semicircular arch flanked by Ionic columns, an entablature, a stepped keystone, and a dentilled cornice which is extended to the outer bays. At the top is a gable containing a swag and a cartouche with a female figure. The outer bays are canted and rusticated at the bases with panels containing swags. Above this are mullioned windows, and at the top is a moulded string course. | II* |
| Ilkeston School; 52.97185°N 1.31578°W | | 1910–14 | The school, designed by G. H. Widdows, is in red brick, mainly rendered, with sandstone dressings, and roofs of reinforced concrete and felt. It consists of four single-storey 13-bay ranges forming a quadrangle, with a pavilion at each corner, and a detached octagonal hall in the centre, linked to the outer ranges by covered ways and verandahs. The entrance is in the centre of the south range, and has two storeys and is rusticated. The doorway has a moulded surround, above it is a five-light mullioned window, and it is approached by a flight of steps flanked by lamp standards. The central hall has quoins in darker brick, a colonnade at the entrance, Diocletian windows above, and surmounted by a dome in reinforced concrete, and a lantern with eight circular windows. | II* |
| War memorial, Market Place; 52.97040°N 1.30897°W | | c. 1920 | The war memorial is in stone, and consists of a cenotaph on three square steps, with a chamfered plinth, a rectangular base with a chamfered top, and a rectangular pier above with nicked corners and a step at the top. On the west front is a carved wreath, and on the east face is a chamfered cross. The base has an inscription, and metal plates with the names of those lost in the two World Wars. The memorial is in an area enclosed by twelve tapering piers linked by wrought iron railings. | II |
| War memorial, Park Cemetery; 52.97066°N 1.30194°W | | c. 1920 | The war memorial, to a standard design by Edward Maufe, is in stone. It has an octagonal plinth and base with overhanging chamfered coping. This is surmounted by a smaller octagonal base with inscriptions, on which is a cross with an octagonal shaft and cross piece. On the front is a wrought iron cross. Behind the memorial is a curving wall with the names of those lost in the First World War. | II |
| Former Ritz Cinema; 52.96959°N 1.30884°W | | 1938 | The former cinema is in brick with glazed faience tile cladding on the entrance front on the corner. It has a wedge-shaped plan, incorporating shops on the south front. Above the entrance is a canopy and a large window with exaggerated transoms, and to the right is a round glazed stair tower. The entrance is flanked by round full-height bays, and inside there is Art Deco decoration. | II |
