= St Peter's High School =

St Peter's High School may refer to:

- St Peter's High School, Burnham-on-Crouch
- St Peter's High School, Gloucester
- St Peter's High School, Mandalay
- St. Peter's High School (Mansfield, Ohio)
- St. Peter's Boys High School, New York
- St. Peter's High School for Girls, New York
- St. Peter's High School, Pakistan

== See also ==
- St. Peter Catholic High School, Ottawa
