= Tenbury High Ormiston Academy =

Tenbury High Ormiston Academy (Formerly - Tenbury High School)

Location
- Oldwood Road; Tenbury Wells; Worcestershire, WR15 8XA; England; 52.3041°N 2.5983°W

Information
- Type: Academy
- Motto: 'High Achievement, Outstanding Care.'
- School district: Malvern Hills District
- Local authority: Worcestershire
- Department for Education URN: 141169 Tables
- Ofsted: Reports
- President: John Hawkins
- Chair of Governors: D Linke
- Principal: Victoria Dean
- Gender: Coeducational
- Age: 11 to 16
- Enrolment: 430
- Houses: Nightingale, Attenborough, Tolkien
- Colours: Black, maroon, green
- Website: www.tenburyhighormistonacademy.co.uk

Tenbury High Ormiston Academy (formerly Tenbury High School) is a coeducational secondary school with academy status located in Tenbury Wells in the English county of Worcestershire. In 2005 it was awarded specialist science and mathematics status.

Previously a community school administered by Worcestershire County Council, Tenbury High School converted to academy status on 1 September 2014 and was renamed Tenbury High Ormiston Academy. The school is now sponsored by the Ormiston Academies Trust but continues to coordinate with Worcestershire County Council for admissions.

== Senior management ==
The post of Executive Principal at the academy is shared with Ormiston Forge Academy in Cradley Heath. As of 2020, the postholder is Andrew Burns.

=== Headteachers ===
- 1998-2013: Stuart Cooke
- 2013-2018: Adrian Price
- 2018–present (as of 2025): Victoria Dean
