= Ormiston Shelfield Community Academy =

Coordinates: 52.6235°N 1.9506°W

Location
- Broad Way; High Heath; Walsall, West Midlands, WS4 1BW; England

Information
- Type: Academy
- Local authority: Walsall
- Trust: Ormiston Academies Trust
- Department for Education URN: 135769 Tables
- Ofsted: Reports
- Headmaster: Michael Riley
- Age: 11 to 18
- Enrolment: Mixed
- Capacity: 1800
- Website: https://www.scacademy.co.uk/

Ormiston Shelfield Community Academy is a secondary school with academy status located in the Metropolitan Borough of Walsall, West Midlands, England. The school is sponsored by Ormiston Academies Trust. As of April 2023 Michael Riley, has served as headteacher.

== History ==
The school was formerly known as Shelfield Sports and Community College. On 6 September, the college was replaced by a new entity, Shelfield Community Academy.

In 2009, plans were announced to rebuild parts of the school as part of a wider redevelopment programme. Kier Education were appointed to build the new school. The first phase of the rebuilding project opened on 7 September 2011 to Year 7 students, incorporating English, Maths, Science, PE and Humanities into the new building. The second phase was partially completed in September 2012. It included new information technology rooms, a library, sixth-form facilities, administrative offices and catering facilities. The school's theatre, which had been closed for refurbishment since September 2011, also reopened.

In 2025, the school proposed further changes to its facilities. These included relocating the external canopies at the cafeteria and constructing an extension. The school also proposed extending the front of the building to provide additional classrooms.

The school also announced plans to work with Shepwell School to provide support through satellite supervision.

== School structure ==
Ormiston Shelfield Community Academy serves approximately 1320 students attending the school, including 420 sixth formers. The school is renowned for significantly improving its exam results within the last five years.
