= Ormiston Meridian Academy =

School in Staffordshire, England

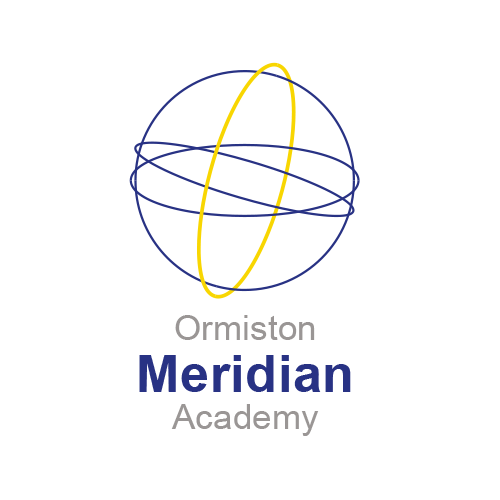

Information
- Type: Academy
- Local authority: Stoke-on-Trent City Council
- Trust: Ormiston Academies Trust
- Department for Education URN: 142186 Tables
- Ofsted: Reports
- Principal: Claire Stanyer
- Gender: Co-educational
- Age: 11 to 16
- Houses: Yousafzai, Bridgewater, Grangewood, Turing
- Website: https://ormistonmeridianacademy.co.uk/

Ormiston Meridian Academy is a co-educational secondary school located in the Meir area of the City of Stoke-on-Trent, Staffordshire, England. The school serves the communities of Meir, Meir Park, Rough Close, Normacot and Lightwood.

== History ==
First known as Sandon High School, the school became a Business and Enterprise College in the early 2000s as part of the Specialist schools programme and was renamed Sandon Business and Enterprise College.

The school was the first secondary school in Stoke-on-Trent (and perhaps England) to benefit from the national programme known as Building Schools for the Future; in February 2008 the college moved into a new £17.3 million building, a £1.2 million sports hall, a Business & Enterprise Centre, together with numerous other specialist facilities.

Previously a foundation school administered by Stoke-on-Trent City Council, in September 2017 Sandon Business and Enterprise College converted to academy status and was renamed Ormiston Meridian Academy. The school is now sponsored by the Ormiston Academies Trust.

== Controversy ==
The secondary school has undergone multiple controversies. Many include lack of safeguarding and being too lenient on bullying, websites like SOT (Stoke-On-Trent Live) have covered this. The school has also been involved with scandals such as teachers who were proven guilty of sexual abuse to minors.

Alongside this, an increase on the workload of students has been shown to take a toll on their mental health as reported by students and parents on School Parrot.
