= Sandymoor =

Civil parish in Cheshire, England

Coordinates: 53.347°N 2.662°W

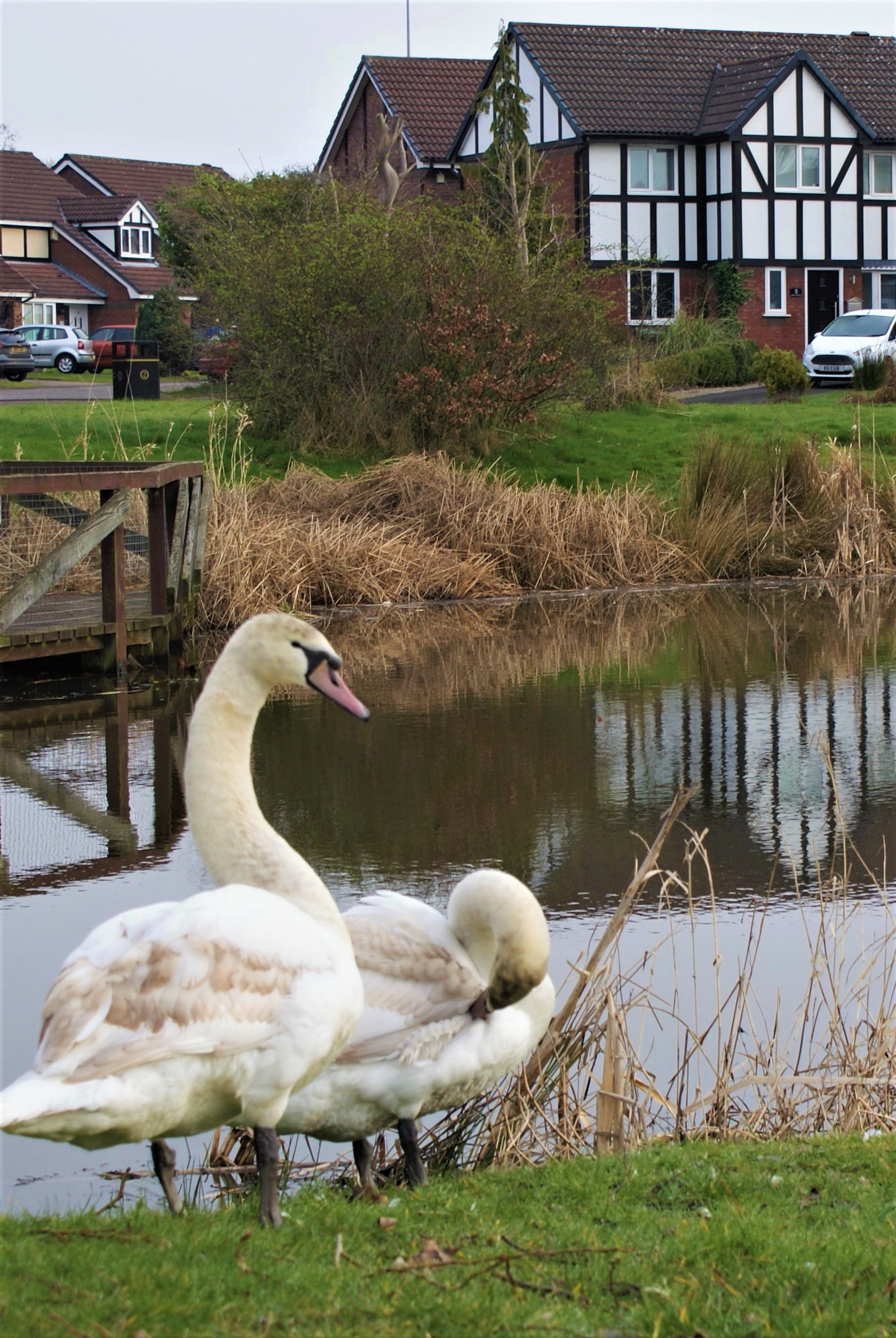
- A snapshot of Sandymoor

- Location within Cheshire
- Population: 3,700 (2021)
- GSS code: E04000318
- OS grid reference: SJ559836
- Civil parish: Sandymoor
- Unitary authority: Halton
- Ceremonial county: Cheshire
- Region: North West
- Country: England
- Sovereign state: United Kingdom
- Post town: RUNCORN
- Postcode district: WA7
- Dialling code: 01928
- Police: Cheshire
- Fire: Cheshire
- Ambulance: North West
- UK Parliament: Runcorn and Helsby
- Website: sandymoorparishcouncil.gov.uk

Sandymoor is a civil parish in Runcorn, Halton, Cheshire, England, with a population of approximately 3,700. The majority of housing in Sandymoor was built post-1990 and the parish was formed in 2008 by the Halton (Parish Electoral Arrangements) Order 2008. Sandymoor lies approximately 3 miles east of Runcorn town centre, 4 miles south-west from Warrington town centre and 2 miles north of the M56 motorway.

== History ==
The area of Sandymoor was designated as part of Runcorn New Town in 1964 and was initially allocated to heavy industry for ICI in the new town masterplan of 1967. However, the masterplan was amended in 1975 as Runcorn Development Corporation judged the amount of land available at Windmill Hill and Murdishaw would be insufficient for the town's growing population by 1979. Sandymoor was redesignated as residential land, capable of accommodating about 7,500–8,000 people. The masterplan amendment envisaged the eventual creation of a "socially integrated community with local centre and shops, primary schools and other facilities such as churches, public house, toddlers' play spaces, adventure play areas, a range of social and recreational facilities and services."

In 1988, approval was given under the New Towns Act 1981 for the development of a gross area of 147 hectares (360 acres). Phase 1 began in the late 1980s and early 1990s with the development of 890 homes. Sandymoor Parish Council was created in 2008. In 2024, the Liverpool City Region Mayor announced plans to build a new train station at Sci-Tech Daresbury, on the border of Sandymoor, as part of a wider proposal to improve transport links in the region.

== Demography ==
The population of Sandymoor increased by 38.2% between the 2011 and 2021 censuses, from 2,678 to 3,700.

At the 2021 census, 95.8% of people in Sandymoor were White, with 1.8% Asian, 1.4% Mixed, 0.6% other and 0.3% Black. The main religion was Christianity at 56.6% and 37.9% had no religion. Islam, Hinduism, Sikhism, Buddhism and Judaism amounted to 1.5%. 4.0% made no religious claims.

Sandymoor is an affluent parish, with 68.2% of households not deprived in any dimension, compared to 48.4% in England.

== Places of interest ==
- Sandymoor Local Centre, a retail development including a restaurant, a convenience store, a bakery, a fish and chips takeaway, and vets.
- Sandymoor Community Hall, a centre hosting daily clubs, classes and events.
- Sandymoor Ormiston Academy, a secondary school established in 2012.
- Manor Park, an industrial estate containing manufacturing, office and warehouse facilities for companies including Thermo Fisher Scientific, The Protein Works, Warburtons, Lidl, B&M and Cheshire Constabulary Custody Suite.
