= Ormiston Chadwick Academy =

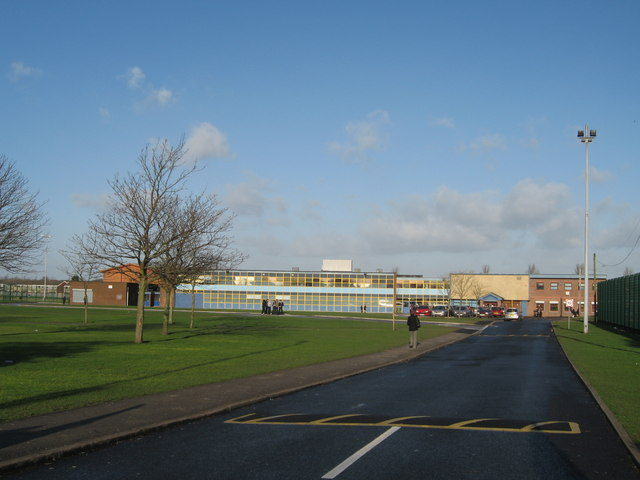
- View of the school (2008)

Location
- Liverpool Road; Widnes, Cheshire, WA8 7HU; England; 53.3724°N 2.7594°W

Information
- Type: Academy
- Motto: Latin: Age Quod Agis, lit. 'Do what you are doing'
- Established: 1958; 68 years ago
- Trust: Ormiston Academies Trust
- Department for Education URN: 140864 Tables
- Ofsted: Reports
- Principal: Jennifer Lowry-Johnson
- Gender: Coeducational
- Age: 11 to 16
- Enrolment: 948 as of January 2024
- Capacity: 976
- Houses: Ellie Simmonds, Stephen Sutton, Malala Yousafzai, Tim Parry
- Website: ormistonchadwickacademy.co.uk

Ormiston Chadwick Academy (formerly The Bankfield School) is a coeducational secondary school with academy status in Widnes, Cheshire.

== History ==
=== Bankfield School ===
Bankfield School opened in September 1958 as a small secondary modern school, before becoming a comprehensive school in 1974. The numbers on the roll fell, and in the 1980s, the school was threatened with closure. In January 1990, following a campaign by the local community, Bankfield became a grant-maintained school. In 1997, the school joined the other schools managed by Halton Borough Council.

In September 2004, Bankfield School was awarded the specialist status Science College and in doing so partnered with the Catalyst Museum and Science Discovery Centre along with 16 industrial sponsors. In 2010, Bankfield became the first school in the Borough of Halton to be judged as 'Outstanding' by Ofsted. The school also gained a second specialism in Applied Learning, and also became a Gifted & Talented Lead School.

=== Ormiston Chadwick Academy ===
In April 2013, Ofsted deemed the school to 'require improvement'. This inspection found that standards in the school had significantly slipped. In January 2013, following an October Ofsted report, the school was placed into special measures. Bankfield was then taken over by an interim executive board who aimed to improve the school, and they appointed John Rigby as the interim executive headteacher. On 1 September 2014, the school re-opened as Ormiston Chadwick Academy. The academy is now sponsored by Ormiston Academies Trust and is paired with Ormiston Bolingbroke Academy in Runcorn.

== Notable former pupils ==
- Derek Twigg, Labour MP for Halton.
