= Ormiston (surname) =

Ormiston is a surname of Scottish origin.

Notable people with the surname include:

- Alec Ormiston (1884–1952), Scottish footballer
- Alexander Ormiston Curle (1866–1955), Scottish lawyer and archaeologist
- Arthur Ormiston Cochrane (1879–1926), Canadian politician
- Graeme Ormiston, Scottish rugby union referee
- Ian Ormiston (born 1963), New Zealand cricketer
- Irving Ormiston (1895–1969), Australian rugby union player
- Isabel Ormiston (1888–1958), Australian medical doctor
- James Ormiston Affleck (1840–1922), Scottish physician and medical author
- James Ormiston McWilliam (1808–1862), Scottish physician
- James Ormiston (1915–1977), Canadian politician
- John Cockburn of Ormiston, Lay supporter of the Scottish Reformation
- John Ormiston (1880–1917), Scottish footballer
- Ken Ormiston (1911–1951), American football player and coach
- Laura Ormiston Chant (1848–1923), English social reformer
- Ross Ormiston (born 1955), New Zealand cricketer
- Susan Ormiston (born c. 1959), Canadian journalist
- Thomas Ormiston (1878–1937), Scottish parliamentarian
- William Ormiston (1935–2014), Australian judge

== See also ==
- Ormiston (disambiguation)
- Ormston, an English-language variation
