= The Grange Academy, Runcorn =

The Grange Academy

Location
- Latham Avenue; Runcorn, Cheshire, WA7 5DX; England
- Coordinates: 53.3346°N 2.7151°W

Information
- Type: Academy
- Motto: Aim high in all things
- Local authority: Borough of Halton
- Trust: Wade Deacon Trust
- Department for Education URN: 144617 Tables
- Ofsted: Reports
- Executive Principal: Jamie Jardine
- Gender: Coeducational
- Age: 3 to 16
- Enrolment: 1130 as of January 2024
- Capacity: 1320
- Website: thegrangeacademy.co.uk

The Grange Academy is a coeducational academy school in Runcorn, Cheshire. It is an all-through school providing primary and secondary education for pupils aged 3 to 16.

Formerly The Grange Comprehensive School, in June 2007 plans were announced for the school to close and to merge with The Heath School in 2012. However, the Education & Skills Select Committee raised objections to the proposal and it was decided that the school would join the adjacent Grange Nursery School, The Grange Infant School and The Grange Junior School to be an all-through school to be named The Grange School. Following improved examination results in 2008, the plan to merge with The Heath School was cancelled and the school became all-through in September 2010.

== Notable former pupils ==
- Susan Nickson, television screenwriter
