= Ormston =

Ormston is an English language toponymic surname, a variation of the Scottish name Ormiston.

- Alexander Ormston (1919–1975), English footballer
- Arthur Ormston (1900–1947), English footballer
- Charles Ormston Eaton (1827–1907), English cricketer and banker
- Dean Ormston, British born comic book artist
- Jack Ormston (1909–2007), British motorcycle speedway rider
- Richard Ormston (born 1961), Anglican archdeacon
- William Ormston (1895–1950), British cyclist
- William Ormston Backhouse (1885–1962), English agriculturalist and geneticist
