= Brownhills Ormiston Academy =

Coordinates: 52.6548°N 1.9308°W

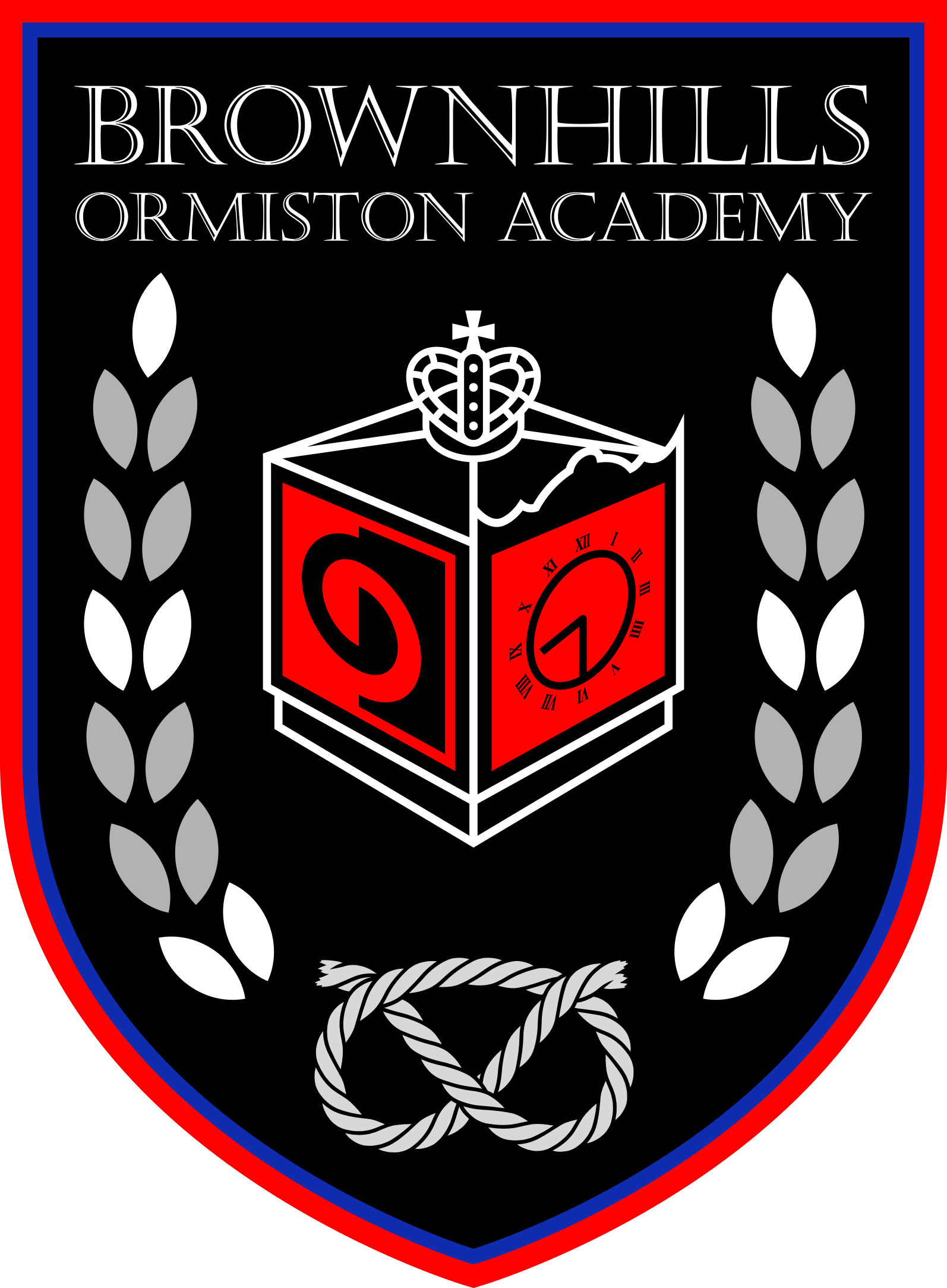
- Current academy logo, used since April 2020

Location
- Deakin Avenue; Brownhills; West Midlands, WS8 7QG; England

Information
- Type: Academy
- Local authority: Walsall
- Trust: Ormiston Academies Trust
- Department for Education URN: 147796 Tables
- Ofsted: Reports
- Headteacher: Ross Doodson
- Gender: Co-educational
- Age: 11 to 16
- Enrolment: 699 as of 2023
- Capacity: 955
- Website: www.brownhillsoa.co.uk

Brownhills Ormiston Academy is a co-educational secondary school located in Brownhills in the West Midlands of England.

Originally known as Brownhills Comprehensive School, it has subsequently been renamed Brownhills Community School, Brownhills Community Technology College, Brownhills Sports College and Brownhills School over the years. As of 1 April 2020, it is an academy sponsored by Ormiston Academies Trust.

Brownhills Ormiston Academy offers GCSEs and BTECs as programmes of study for pupils.

== School performance and inspections ==
As of 2023, the school's most recent inspection by Ofsted was in 2017, before its conversion to an academy. This was a short inspection which confirmed the previous judgement from 2013 of Good.

== Notable former pupils ==
- Erin O'Connor, model
