= John Pilkington Hudson =

English bomb disposer and horticulture professor (1910–2007)

John Pilkington Hudson, CBE, GM & Bar, VMH (24 July 1910 – 6 December 2007) was an English horticultural scientist who did pioneer work on long-distance transportability of what became known as the kiwifruit. He was also a celebrated bomb disposal expert.

== Background ==
Hudson was born on 24 July 1910 in Buxton, Derbyshire, to William Arthur Hudson (1884–1976), a post-office employee from Cheshire, and his wife Bertha, née Pilkington (1887–1969), daughter of a local coal merchant. He had a younger sister, Margaret. He attended New Mills Secondary School, but left at 16 to work in a garden nursery his father had started at Chapel-en-le-Frith. Nonetheless, he showed an early interest in physics.

After a one-year course in horticulture, he went on to take a University of London external degree in the subject at the Midland Agricultural and Dairy College in Sutton Bonington, and briefly lectured there in 1935. In 1936 he married Mary Gretta Heath (1910–1989), a dairy chemist, daughter of William Nathaniel Heath, farmer. They had two sons, Colin and Richard. They lived in Plumpton, East Sussex for three years while Hudson worked as an East Sussex County Council horticultural adviser.

== Bomb disposal ==
Shortly before the Second World War, Hudson joined the Territorial Army. He immediately saw action in France and was evacuated from Dunkirk. He was then assigned to bomb disposal with the Royal Engineers, heading a group in Sheffield. There his scientific acumen stood him in good stead and he was summoned to work on new defusing methods in London, with the rank of major.

Hudson's war career included several months in the United States liaising with bomb disposal experts there. He was appointed a Member of the Order of the British Empire. He was awarded a George Medal in 1943 for disabling the first anti-tamper Y bomb fuse on 24 January 1943, six days after an intact fuse had first been recovered. According to an obituarist:

He returned to London [from the States] just in time to tackle a new type of enemy battery-powered fuse. It could be paralysed by liquid oxygen, which deadened the batteries, but the resulting extremely low temperature would crack the bomb-casing, setting off another type of fuse. Working on a half-tonne UXB near the Albert bridge... he neutralised the main fuse, and heard the crack but no explosion. He coolly climbed down into the crater and bodily removed the fuse.... For this he was awarded his first George Medal in 1943.

In 1944 he received a Bar to his George Medal for defusing the first V1 flying bomb or "doodlebug" to land intact. The nature of his war work remained unknown to friends until a Channel 4 television series on defusing was shown in 2001.

== Research career ==
After the war, Hudson found work in the government agricultural department in Wellington, on the transportability of Actinidia chinensis var. deliciosa, then known as the Chinese gooseberry, later the kiwifruit or kiwi. Seeds of the fruit had been introduced into New Zealand from China in the early 20th century. He was also involved in setting up a research station at Levin, New Zealand.

In 1948 the Hudsons returned to England, where he became a lecturer in horticulture at Sutton Bonington, by then a faculty of the new University of Nottingham. After obtaining a PhD degree in 1954, he became the first occupant of the university's chair of horticulture in 1958 and then dean of the faculty of agriculture and horticulture in 1965. His research was in the field of plant propagation, particularly environmental factors in plant growth. In addition to his research and administrative work in Nottingham, from 1961–1963 he was seconded for six months each year to the department of horticulture at the University of Khartoum, as a visiting professor.

Hudson left Nottingham in 1967 to direct the Long Ashton Research Station, the job being coupled with a chair of horticultural science at the University of Bristol. There his administrative abilities were stretched by government spending cuts and the need for full reorganisation. He was already editor (1965–1982) of the journal Experimental Agriculture and serving on other editorial boards. He was noted for the precision and clarity of his teaching. Peter Waister, a former graduate student of Hudson's, stated at his funeral, "I was impressed by his ability to balance the three areas [research, teaching and advisory work] and to be inspirational in them all, a rare achievement."

Hudson's honours included an associateship of honour of the Royal New Zealand Institute of Horticulture in 1948, the presidency of the former Horticultural Educational Association, founder membership and an honorary fellowship of the UK Institute of Horticulture, appointment as a Commander of the Order of the British Empire for services to horticulture in 1975, and in 1976 the Victoria Medal of Honour from the Royal Horticultural Society.

== Retirement ==
John and Gretta Hudson retired to Wrington, Somerset, where they developed a large garden, which Hudson tended almost unaided into his nineties. Other interests included the local choral society, gliding, volunteering for the Weston-super-Mare Samaritans, and fell-walking. He acted as carer for his wife after she suffered a stroke in 1986. His son Colin, a tropical agronomist in Barbados, predeceased him in 2004. He was survived by his son Richard, a professor of linguistics at University College, London. He died on 6 December 2007 of kidney failure aged 97.

== External sources ==
- The website created by his son Richard: http://dickhudson.com/family/#John
- James Owen: Danger UXB: The Heroic Story of the WWII Bomb Disposal Teams (London: Little, Brown, 2010) gives a lengthy account of the wartime work in which Hudson was involved.
- Another account of his bomb disposal work: Retrieved 24 July 2011.
