= Astmoor =

Suburb of Runcorn, Cheshire, England

Coordinates: 53.34°N 02.70°W

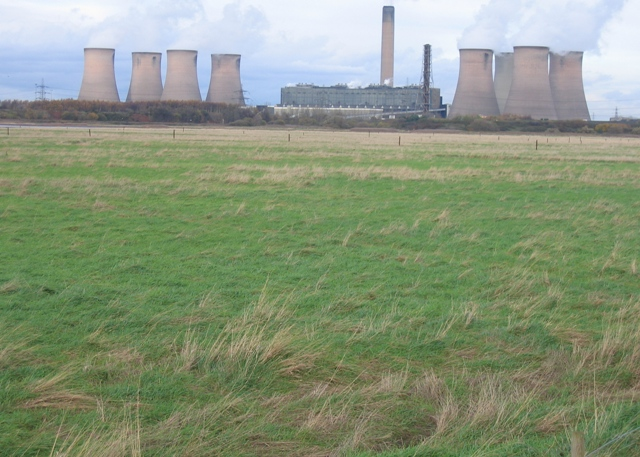
- Astmoor Saltmarsh and Hempstone Point Taken from just outside the square, but from the most northerly point of public access in the Wigg Island Community Park Nature Reserve. This shows the flat green Astmoor Saltmarsh stretching out to Hempstones Point. The darker raised land and the power station are on the opposite bank of the River Mersey.

- Location within Cheshire
- OS grid reference: SJ5383
- Unitary authority: Halton
- Ceremonial county: Cheshire
- Region: North West
- Country: England
- Sovereign state: United Kingdom
- Police: Cheshire
- Fire: Cheshire
- Ambulance: North West

Astmoor is a suburb of Runcorn in Cheshire, England.
