= New Mills School =

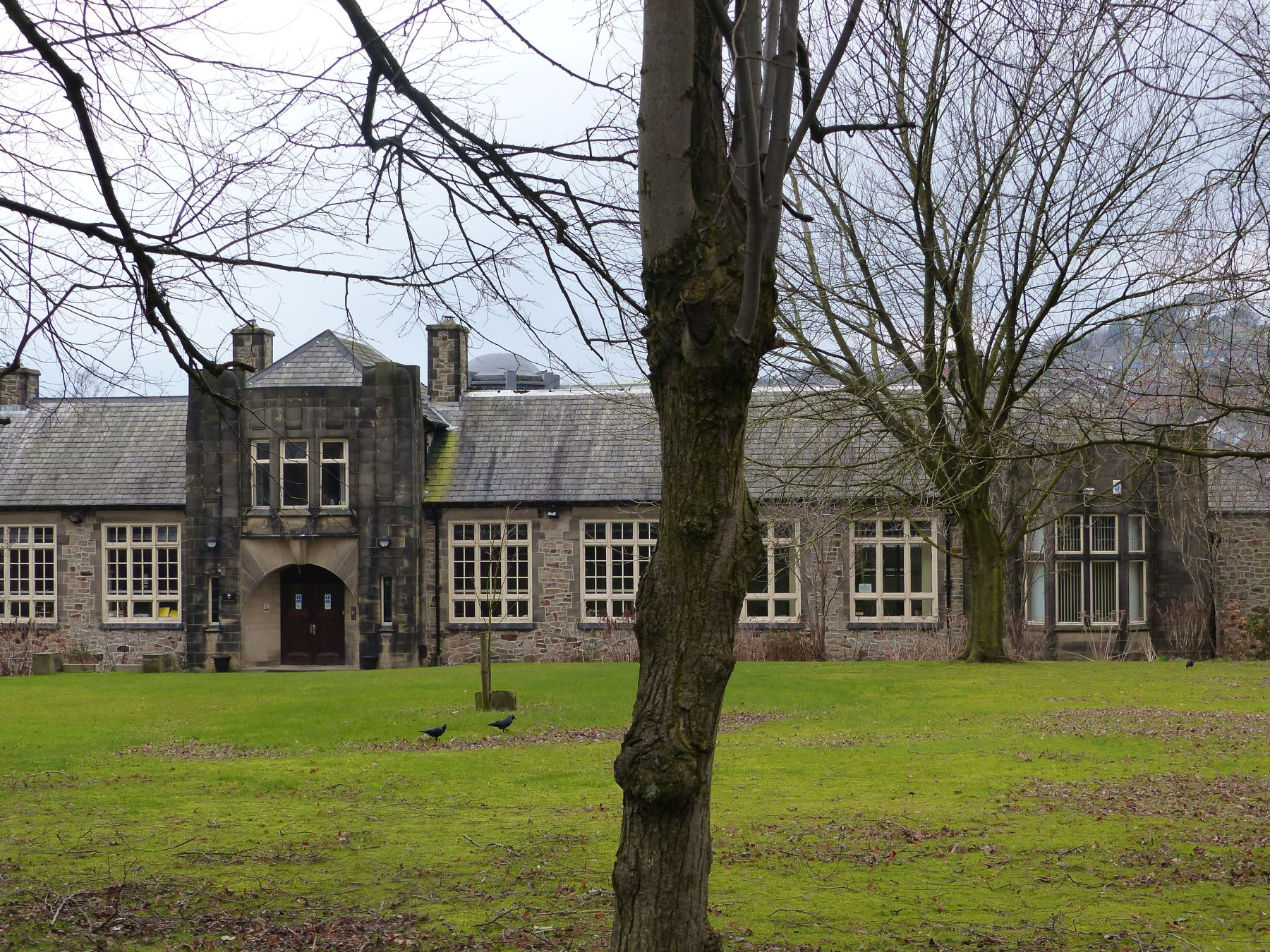

Location
- Church Lane, New Mills; High Peak, Derbyshire, SK22 4NP; England; 53°22′01″N 1°59′49″W

Information
- Type: Community school
- Motto: Let Right Be Done
- Established: 1912
- Local authority: Derbyshire
- Department for Education URN: 112936 Tables
- Ofsted: Reports
- Head teacher: Heather Watts
- Staff: 65
- Gender: Coeducational
- Age: 11 to 16
- Enrolment: 695 pupils
- Colours: Black, red
- Former name: New Mills Grammar School; New Mills School Business and Enterprise College
- Website: http://www.newmillsschool.co.uk/

New Mills School is a comprehensive school in the town of New Mills, in the north west of Derbyshire.

== Admissions ==
The school teaches pupils from Year 7 to Year 11. The school was given its title as Business and Enterprise College in 2005 and this status was renewed in 2009.

The school's main feeder primary schools are New Mills, Newtown, St George's, Thornsett, Hayfield, Hague Bar and St Mary's.

== History ==
=== Grammar school ===
The school was opened in 1912 as the New Mills Grammar School and celebrated its 100th birthday in 2012. It had around 500 boys and girls in the early 1960s, then 600 by 1964 and 700 by 1969, with a sixth form of 200. The school was designed by George H. Widdows, the Chief Architect of Derbyshire County Council, described as "a leading designer of schools in the early C20 and an exponent of advanced ideas on school planning and hygiene", and is a Grade II listed building.

=== Headteachers ===
- Norman Taylor (d.1962, had a distinguished war career)
- Philip Vennis 1962–71 (died 1999; former deputy headteacher, Ounsdale High School 1955–62, Principal of Itchen College 1971–88)
- Jesse Elms, resigned early 2014.
- John Kuczaj, temporary headteacher for the rest of the 2013–14 school year.
- Debbie McGloin, 2014–19, current headteacher of Glossopdale School.
- Alison Barker and Caroline Jesson, 2019–21.
- Heather Watts, current head.

== Subjects ==
There were 23 subjects at New Mills School, taught by 59 teachers in 8 different buildings and 50 rooms: rooms 5–18, Music 1–2, Language 1–4, Maths 1–6, Sixth Form 1–5, Drama 1–2, Art 1–3, the Gym, Workshop 1–2, Food 1–2, 8 Science labs and a construction centre.

The school lost its sixth form, in spite of considerable local support, in 2017 and in 2019 it now is a 11–16 Comprehensive.

The school is home to Take Part in the Art, a local arts scheme.

== Notable former pupils ==
=== New Mills Grammar School ===
- Thomas Brimelow, Baron Brimelow CMG OBE, Ambassador to Poland from 1966 to 1969
- Prof Reginald Coates, civil engineer
- Lloyd Cole, musician
- Sir Martin Doughty, chairman of Natural England from 2006, and of the Association of National Park Authorities from 1997 to 2001, and leader of Derbyshire County Council from 1992 to 2001
- Sir Brian Heap CBE, master of St Edmund's College, Cambridge from 1996 to 2004
- Tony Marchington, entrepreneur
- John Pilkington Hudson CBE GM, Professor of Horticultural Science at the University of Bristol and Director of the Long Ashton Research Station from 1967 to 1975, and Professor of Horticulture from 1958 to 1967 at the University of Nottingham
- Roy Powell, jazz pianist

=== New Mills Secondary School ===
- Tess Daly, television presenter
