= Ormiston Ilkeston Enterprise Academy =

Location
- Ilkeston, Derbyshire, DE7 5HS; England
- Coordinates: 52.971558°N 1.316294°W

Information
- Type: Academy
- Department for Education URN: 137109 Tables
- Ofsted: Reports
- Principal (interim): Simon Glover
- Gender: Coeducational
- Age: 11 to 16
- Website: http://www.oiea.co.uk/

Ormiston Ilkeston Enterprise Academy (OIEA) is a coeducational secondary school with academy status, located on two sites in Ilkeston in the English county of Derbyshire.

OIEA is an amalgamation of two academies operated by the Ormiston Academies Trust. Ormiston Enterprise Academy on Bennerley Avenue was Bennerley Business and Enterprise College, and Bennerley School before that. The Ormiston Ilkeston Academy on King George Avenue was Ilkeston School, and Ilkeston Grammar School before that.

Bennerley Business and Enterprise College and Ilkeston School were community schools directly administered by Derbyshire County Council. However OIEA continues to coordinate with Derbyshire County Council for admissions. The school offers GCSEs and BTECs as programmes of study for pupils.
