= Ormiston Rivers Academy =

Location
- Southminster Road; Burnham-on-Crouch, Essex, CM0 8QB; England; 51.638835°N 0.811468°E

Information
- Type: Academy
- Established: 1958
- Local authority: Essex
- Trust: Ormiston Academies Trust
- Department for Education URN: 137152 Tables
- Ofsted: Reports
- Principal: Jo Williams
- Gender: Mixed
- Age: 11 to 18
- Enrolment: Approx. 820 as of January 2015
- Capacity: 1050
- Website: https://www.ormistonriversacademy.co.uk/

Ormiston Rivers Academy (formerly St Peter's High School) is a secondary school and sixth form with academy status located in Burnham-on-Crouch, Essex, England.

The school was first established in 1958 as St Peter's High School. In 2011 the school became an academy and was renamed Ormiston Rivers Academy. The school is one of many in the UK that is operated and funded by the Ormiston Academies Trust, an organisation for education in the UK.

== Feeder schools ==
The main feeder schools in the area are:

- Maylandsea Primary School
- St Cedds, Bradwell-on-Sea
- Latchingdon Primary School
- Burnham-on-Crouch Primary
- St Mary's, Burnham-on-Crouch
- Purleigh Primary School
- Southminster Primary School
- Tillingham St Nicholas Church of England School
- Woodham Walter Church of England Primary
- The Plume School
