= Ormiston Trust =

Charitable trust based in London, England

Ormiston Trust is a charitable trust based in London, England. It is a grant-making trust that chiefly assists schools and organisations supporting children and young people.

The trust was established in the memory of Fiona Ormiston Murray who died in a car crash with her husband on their honeymoon in 1969.

Much of the trust's work is accomplished through its two main subsidiaries - Ormiston Families and Ormiston Academies Trust.

== Ormiston Families ==
Ormiston Families (formerly Ormiston Children and Families Trust) is registered charity that has some financial support from Ormiston Trust. It delivers a range of child and family centred programmes across the East of England including support for those affected by the imprisonment of a family member, services for new mothers and mothers to be, as well as mental health and wellbeing support services for children and young people.

=== Prison Visitor Centres ===
Ormiston Families operates Prison Visitor Centres in the following prisons:

- HM Prison Bure
- HM Prison Chelmsford
- HM Prison Littlehey
- HM Prison Norwich
- HM Prison Wayland
- HM Prison Highpoint
- HM Prison Norwich
- HM Prison Hollesley Bay
- HM Prison Whitemoor
- HM Prison Warren Hill

== Ormiston Academies Trust ==
Ormiston Academies Trust (OAT) is a charity and incorporated company which operates schools with academy status.

=== Secondary schools ===
In total, there are 31 secondary schools operated by Ormiston Academies Trust.

- Ormiston Bolingbroke Academy, Runcorn
- Broadland High Ormiston Academy, Hoveton
- Brownhills Ormiston Academy, Walsall
- Ormiston Bushfield Academy, Peterborough
- Ormiston Chadwick Academy, Widnes
- City of Norwich School, An Ormiston Academy, Norwich
- Cliff Park Ormiston Academy, Gorleston
- Cowes Enterprise College, An Ormiston Academy, Cowes
- Ormiston Denes Academy, Lowestoft
- Ormiston Endeavour Academy, Ipswich
- Flegg High Ormiston Academy, Martham
- Ormiston Forge Academy, Cradley Heath
- George Salter Academy, West Bromwich
- Ormiston Horizon Academy, Stoke-on-Trent
- Ormiston Ilkeston Enterprise Academy, Ilkeston
- Ormiston Maritime Academy, Grimsby
- Ormiston Meridian Academy, Stoke-on-Trent
- Ormiston NEW Academy, Fordhouses
- Ormiston Rivers Academy, Burnham-on-Crouch
- Ormiston Sandwell Community Academy, Tividale
- Sandymoor Ormiston Academy, Runcorn
- Ormiston Shelfield Community Academy, Pelsall
- Ormiston Sir Stanley Matthews Academy, Stoke-on-Trent
- Ormiston Six Villages Academy, Chichester
- Stoke High School – Ormiston Academy, Ipswich
- Ormiston Sudbury Academy, Sudbury
- Ormiston SWB Academy, Wolverhampton
- Tenbury High Ormiston Academy, Tenbury Wells
- Ormiston Venture Academy, Gorleston
- Ormiston Victory Academy, Costessey
- Wodensborough Ormiston Academy, Wednesbury

=== Primary schools ===
In total, there are seven primary schools operated by Ormiston Academies Trust.

- Ormiston Cliff Park Primary Academy, Gorleston
- Edward Worlledge Ormiston Academy, Great Yarmouth
- Ormiston Herman Academy, Great Yarmouth
- Hunnyhill Ormiston Academy, Newport, Isle of Wight
- Ormiston Meadows Academy, Peterborough
- Packmoor Ormiston Academy, Stoke-on-Trent
- Ormiston South Parade Academy, Grimsby

=== Alternative provision and special schools ===
In total, there are six schools operated by Ormiston Academies Trust in its alternative provision and special group.

- Ormiston Beachcroft Academy, London
- Ormiston Bridge Academy, London
- Ormiston Latimer Academy, London
- Ormiston Kensington Queensmill Academy, London
- Ormiston Queensmill Academy, London
- Thomas Wolsey Ormiston Academy, Ipswich

== See also ==
- List of charitable foundations
