= Sandymoor Ormiston Academy =

Location
- Wharford Lane, Sandymoor; Runcorn, Cheshire, WA7 1QU; England; 53.3436°N 2.6547°W

Information
- Type: Academy
- Established: September 2012 (Free School), December 2019 (Academy)
- Local authority: Borough of Halton
- Trust: Ormiston Academies Trust
- Department for Education URN: 147683 Tables
- Ofsted: Reports
- Principal: Linsey Hand
- Gender: Coeducational
- Age: 11 to 18
- Enrolment: 601 as of January 2024
- Capacity: 600
- Houses: Brindley, Hartree, Ethelfleda, Valdez
- Colours: Blue, White, Green and Black
- Website: sandymooroa.co.uk

Sandymoor Ormiston Academy is a coeducational secondary school located in the Parish of Sandymoor, Runcorn, Cheshire, England. The school originally opened as Sandymoor School, a free school, in September 2012 in temporary premises, and relocated to a new permanent home in 2014.

In December 2019, the school joined Ormiston Academies Trust and was renamed Sandymoor Ormiston Academy. The Principal, appointed in 2025, is Ms Linsey Hand.
