= Erewash Museum =

Museum in Ilkeston, Derbyshire, England

Coordinates: 52.9715°N 1.3071°W

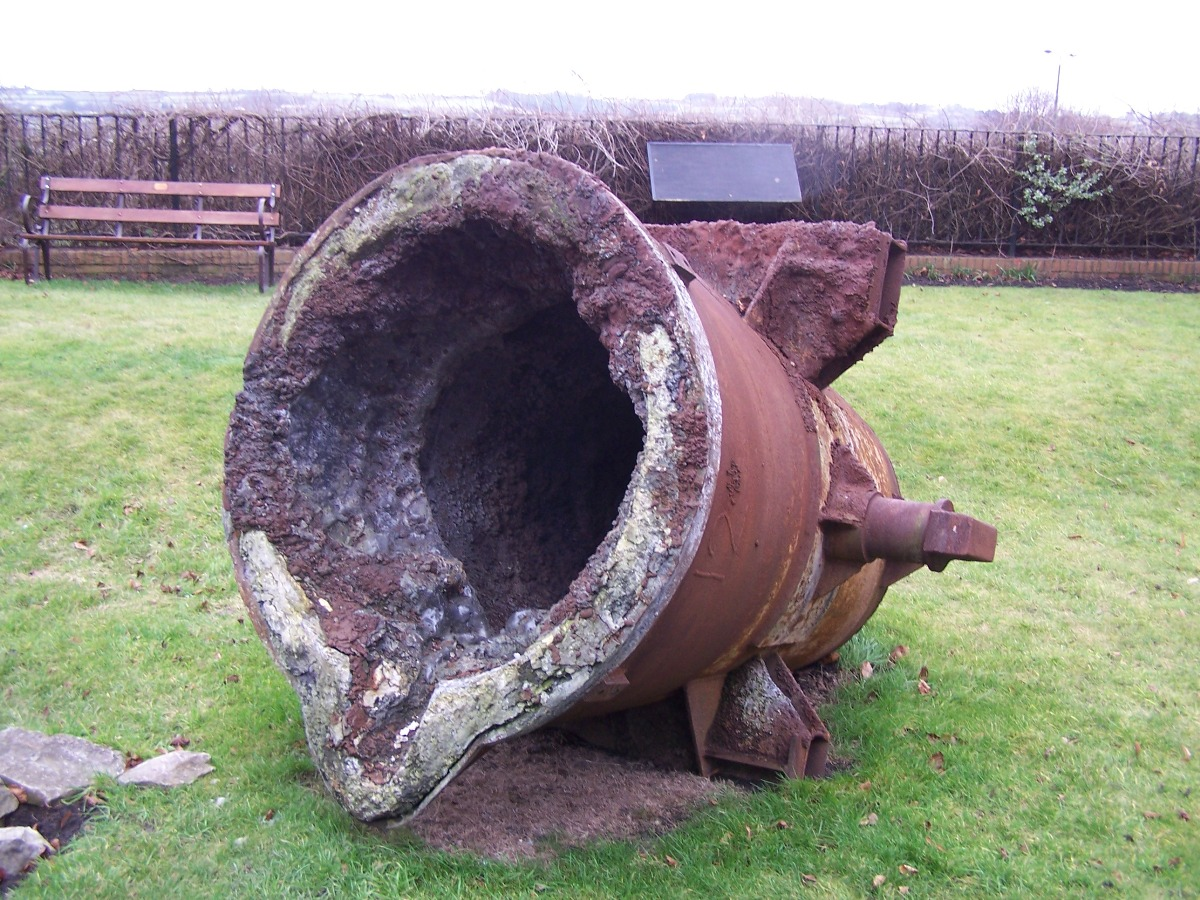
Ladle once used at Stanton Ironworks for handling molten iron, now in the gardens of the Erewash Museum

The Erewash Museum is located in Ilkeston, Erewash, in Derbyshire, England. Housed in Dalby House, a building that once served as a school and private home.

The museum opened in the 1980s, and focuses on the history of the Erewash area, with exhibits covering the Second World War, archaeology, and the Stanton Ironworks.

== See also ==
- Listed buildings in Ilkeston
