= Stuart Palmer (physicist) =

British physicist

Stuart Palmer FREng, also known as S. B. Palmer, was the honorary secretary of the Institute of Physics, and was the deputy vice-chancellor of the University of Warwick between 1999 and 2009. He is an emeritus professor of physics at Warwick who has worked in condensed matter physics and engineering physics and has extensively exploited the technique of ultrasound.

Palmer was born in Ilkeston, Derbyshire, studied at Sheffield University and spent 20 years at Hull University before moving to Warwick in 1987, where he was head of the physics department for 12 years.

While working at the University of Hull he led a team applying ultrasound to the diagnosis and monitoring of osteoporosis. This led to an ultrasonic index for osteoporosis and the development of commercial ultrasound heel scanners that are available worldwide.

More recently, he has developed techniques for the non-contact generation and detection of ultrasound based on both laser and electromagnetic techniques which have found a wide range of industrial applications.

His most esoteric discovery, with Jose Baruchel of ILL and ESRF in Grenoble, France, is the existence of helical or chirality magnetic domains in certain antiferromagnetic materials.

In addition to his role as honorary secretary of the Institute of Physics, he chaired the board of the Institute of Physics Publishing and the TRAC Development Group of the Higher Education Funding Council for England (2004-2015). He was a visiting professor at Queensland University of Technology in Brisbane, Australia (2014-18), and Chaired the Council of Cardiff University (2014-22) in the UK. He was secretary general of IUPAP from 2012 to 2014. and Hon Treasurer of EPS from 2019-2024.

He was appointed Chair of Council at Brunel University of London in 2022, Trustee of UCEA in 2017 and Deputy Chair of UCEA in 2024.

In 2005, a Hull Trains Class 222 was named 'Professor Stuart Palmer' in his honour. He became a Fellow of the Royal Academy of Engineering in 2000 and an Honorary Fellow of the Institute of Physics in 2026.

In 2018, he won the Phillips Award.
