= George H. Widdows =

English architect

- Born: 15 October 1871; Norwich
- Died: 11 February 1946 (aged 74); Allestree, Derby
- Occupation: Architect
- Awards: Fellow of the Royal Institute of British Architects in 1913
- Buildings: Ilkeston School Heanor Grammar School, Heanor Derbsyshire
- Projects: Design of 60 elementary schools and 17 secondary schools in Derbyshire

George H. Widdows (15 October 1871 – 11 February 1946) was an English architect who pioneered changes to school building design to enhance the health of school children. He was also responsible for the design of about 80 schools in Derbyshire, where he became Chief Architect.

== Biography ==
=== Early years ===
George H. Widdows was born Francis George Henry Widdows in 1871 in the city of Norwich. He remained in Norwich for 23 years, attending the King Edward VI School, Norwich and then training to become an architect at the office of the Cathedral's Diocesan Surveyor.

To gain more experience he then spent three years with various architects around England. In 1897, he was appointed as Chief Architectural Assistant at Derby Corporation (forerunner of what is now Derby City Council). He spend seven years there on minor building projects.

In 1904 Widdows was elected an Associate of the Royal Institute of British Architects.

=== Derbyshire years ===
In 1904, Widdows made a move that marked the start of his specialisation on school architecture. He left Derby Corporation and joined Derbyshire County Council's Education Committee as Building Surveyor. The work he did for the Education Committee obviously made an impression on the County Council because, in 1910, they appointed him as Chief Architect across all their services. The massive school building programme during the subsequent period ensured that Widdows' efforts remained focussed on schools.

He was elected as a Fellow of the Royal Institute of British Architects in 1913.

By the time he retired in 1936, he had designed some sixty elementary and seventeen secondary schools in Derbyshire.

=== Final years ===
Widdows designed and built his own house at Allestree near Derby and retired there in 1936. He died at his home in 1946, aged 74.

== School building design ==
To understand the pioneering work done by Widdows on school building design, it is necessary to understand the environment in which he was working.

=== The school building boom years ===
The growth in industry in the nineteenth century saw many people move around the country, particularly from rural to town areas, to gain employment. This resulted in population changes that required the building of new schools. This was particularly true in the east of Derbyshire where there had been a massive boom in the coal-mining and textile manufacturing industries in the 1890s.

=== Legislation affecting schools ===
==== Creation of LEAs ====
School boards were created in boroughs and parishes under the Elementary Education Act 1870. These boards were semi-independent of the borough and parish councils. School boards were abolished by the Education Act 1902, which replaced them with local education authorities (LEAs). In the case of Derbyshire the authority was Derbyshire County Council. The 1902 Act ensured that schools now had solid financing from local ratepayers and had to meet uniform standards. This led to a rapid growth, especially of secondary schools.

==== Child health ====
The Education (Administrative Provisions) Act 1907 meant that schools became subject to regular medical inspections. This led to a new working partnership between the medical profession and school architects and designers.

=== Widdows' designs ===
Prior to the setting up of school boards in 1870, the mass education that took place happened in buildings not purpose-designed for children e.g. church halls. After 1870, the school boards did construct purpose-built schools to locally determined designs but these were often cramped and poorly ventilated. Once local education authorities were set up in 1902, some standardisation of school building design began to take place.

In addition, at a national level, medical pressure grew to incorporate building design features to enhance child health and welfare. The first major national conference on school hygiene was held in 1904. Within Derbyshire County Council, there was a good working relationship between the Medical Officer and the Chief Architect, George Widdows. This relationship nurtured the innovative designs of Widdows.

Typical health-related features of Widdows' designs included:

- Spacious classrooms
- Large windows, allowing natural daylight and sun to permeate the rooms
- Wide internal corridors to allow the pupils to exercise ("drill") in bad weather conditions
- External verandahs to allow the children to exercise in inclement weather
- Ventilation from both sides of the school buildings and rooms

Further characteristic features of Widdows-designed schools included:

- Single storey buildings where the site permitted
- Use of good (and often local) materials
- Standard designs that allowed different configurations depending on school site and size
- Often designed in an Arts & Crafts / neo-vernacular style

== Recognition ==
=== Antemortem ===
The advances Widdows made in school design were recognised by his contemporaries. In an article on provincial school building in 1913, The Builder periodical stated that his work "constitutes a revolution in the planning and arrangement of school buildings... a real advance which places English school architecture without a rival in any European country or the United States."

George Widdows became one of the most respected men in his profession and in 1921 read his paper on 'School Design' to the Royal Institute of British Architects. In thanking him, the Head of the Board of Education (equivalent to the Department of Education in 2015) Felix Clay said "No architect has done more than Mr. Widdows to develop the modern school. The whole emphasis of design has shifted. Instead of the old of compact three-storeyed central hall building we have a bewildering variety of plans from cart-wheels to L-shaped buildings, but all arranged so as to secure the maximum amount of sun and to get air into the classroom from both sides."

=== Postmortem ===
George Widdows died in 1946, a year before the passing of the Town and Country Planning Act 1947. This legislation was the foundation of the current heritage protection rules and its associated "listing" of historic buildings by English Heritage. Since 1975, sixteen of Widdows' schools have been designated as Listed Grade II, indicating that the buildings are nationally important and of special interest. Ilkeston School has received the higher designation of Listed Grade II*, indicating that the building is considered to be a particularly important building of more than special interest.

Nikolaus Pevsner's Buildings of England is a highly respected series of architectural guides covering every English county. Pevsner's comments on Widdows buildings include "Also of interest [in Derbyshire] are some of the schools...those of G H Widdows...are enlightened in plan, with covered ways and large windows and always interesting in their motifs."

In a more recent guide to Buildings in Derbyshire, Richard Stone says "Widdows had radical ideas...to meet demands for higher standards of health and hygiene in education. That he was able to put these ideas into practice is testament to the confidence he inspired."

In 2011, English Heritage published a guide to outline the selection criteria to be used when designating education buildings. This specifically mentions Widdows, as follows: "As education moved away from instruction by rote, so the more ambitious authorities began to consider school buildings from the point of view of the child with issues of health and mental stimulation to the fore. A pioneer in the building of well-ventilated and less utilitarian schools was George Widdows, architect to Derbyshire Education Committee from 1904. His innovative designs, in a neo-vernacular style, with cross ventilation and a ‘marching corridor’ for exercise, proved lastingly influential."

Although George Widdows has now received the respect he deserves from architecture, education, health and heritage professionals, he perhaps hasn't received the same level of recognition from the wider public. As an example, in 2011, George Widdows was one of twelve historical figures selected from about 70 public nominations for getting a Derbyshire County Council blue plaque dedicated to them. However, when it came to a public vote, Widdows did not reach the final six chosen.

== List of schools designed by Widdows ==
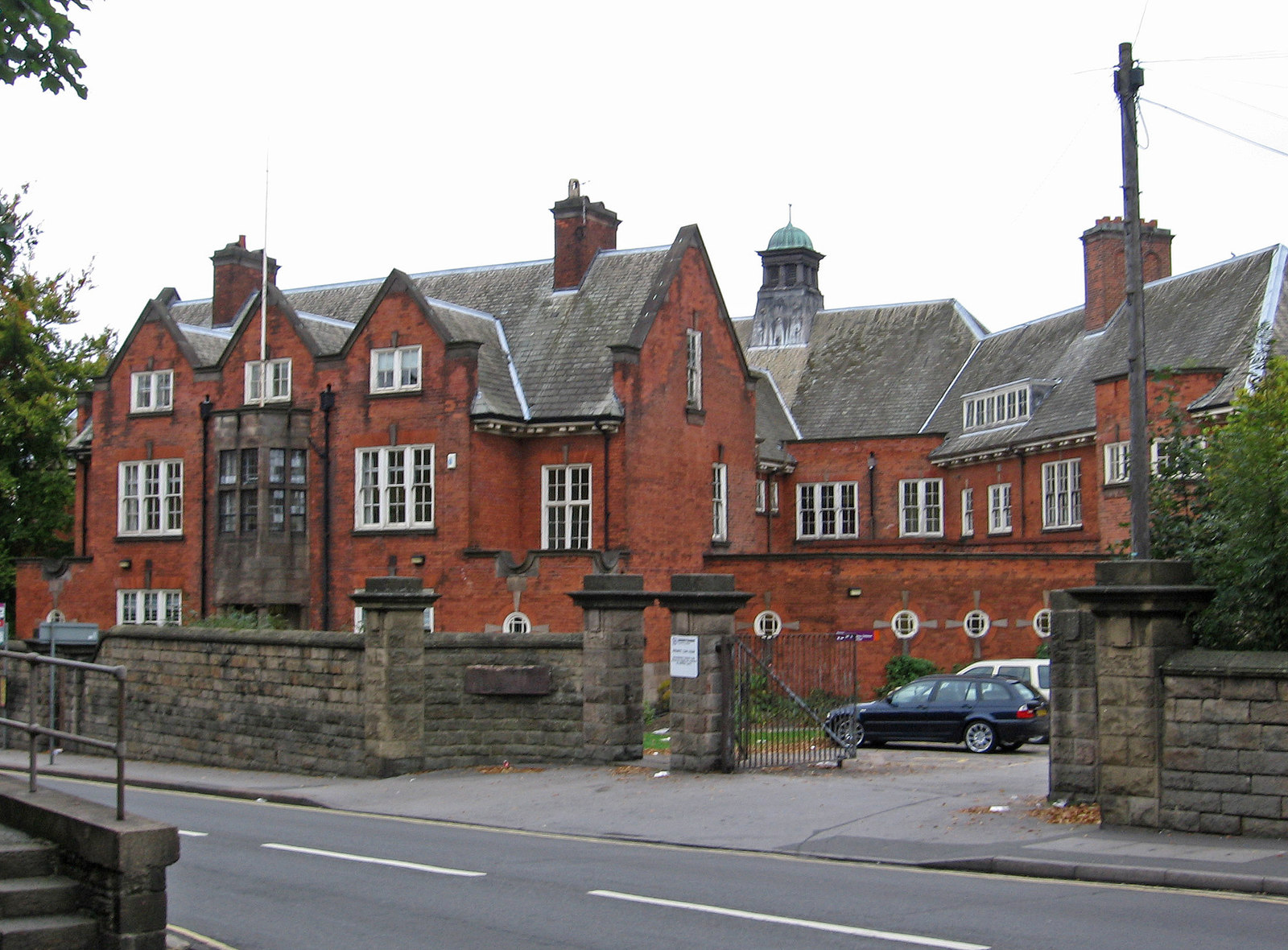
Chesterfield St Helena's Secondary School

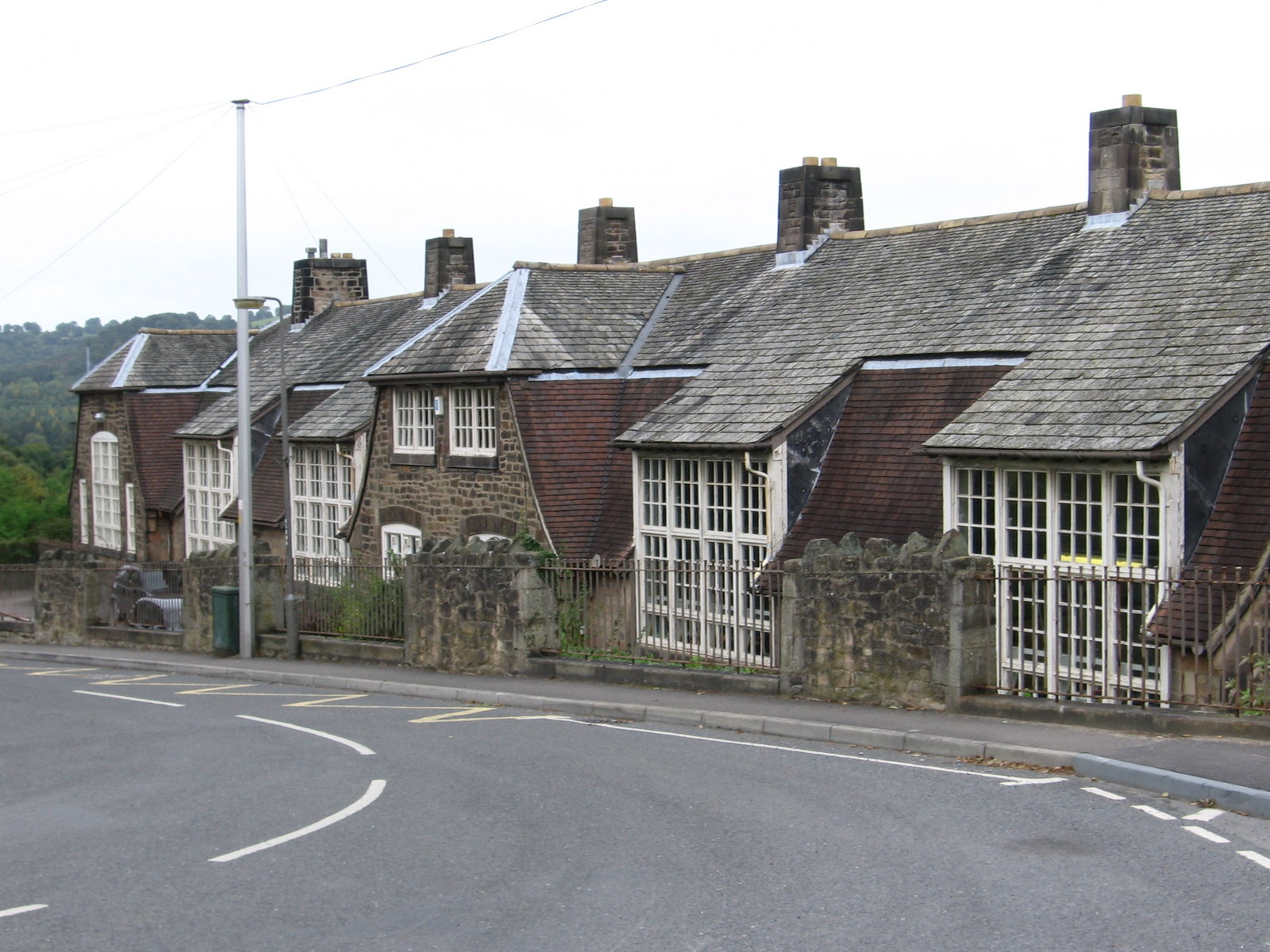
Darley Dale School

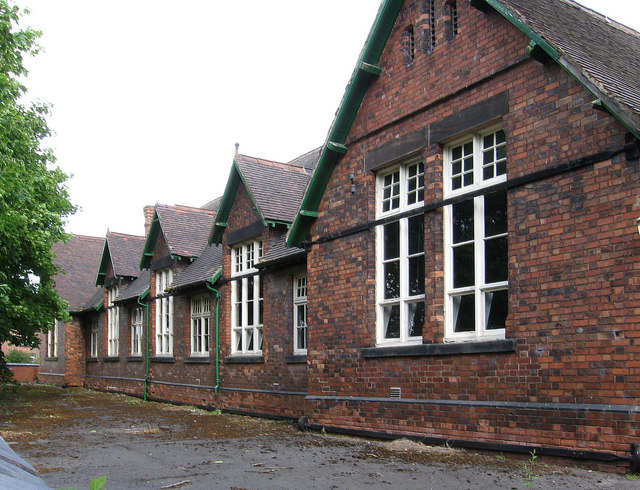
Denby John Flamsteed School

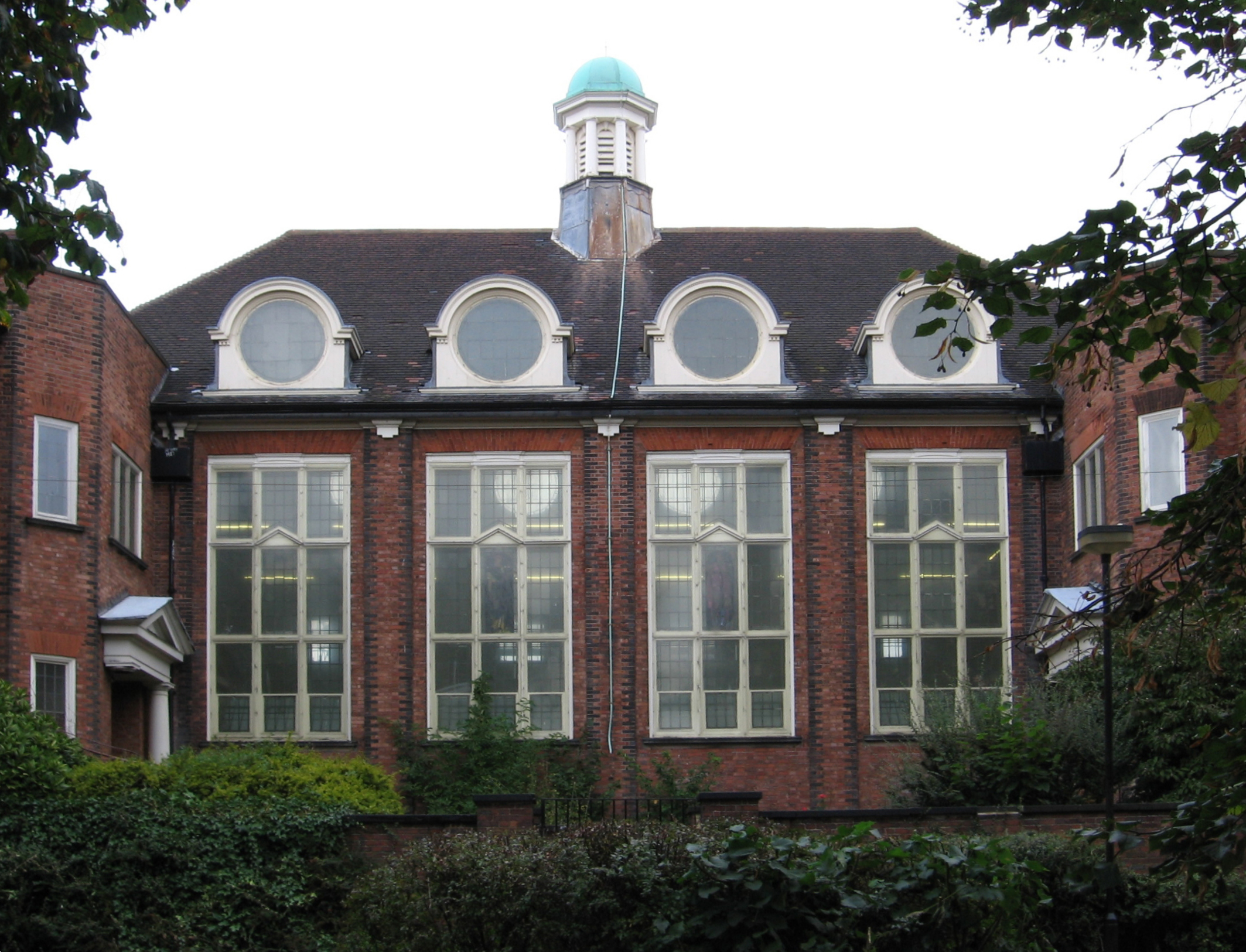
Heanor South East Derbyshire College

Hope Primary School

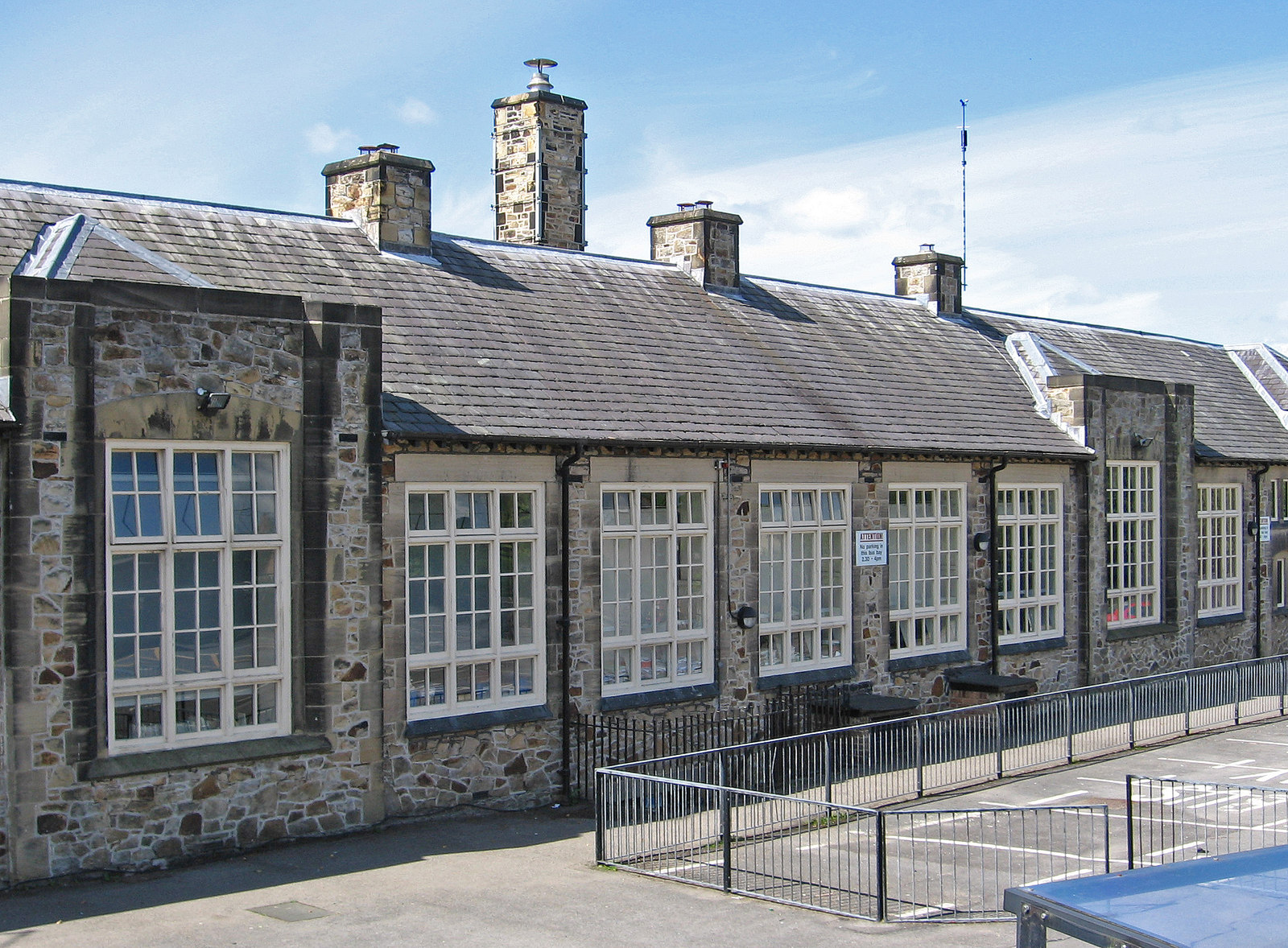
New Mills School

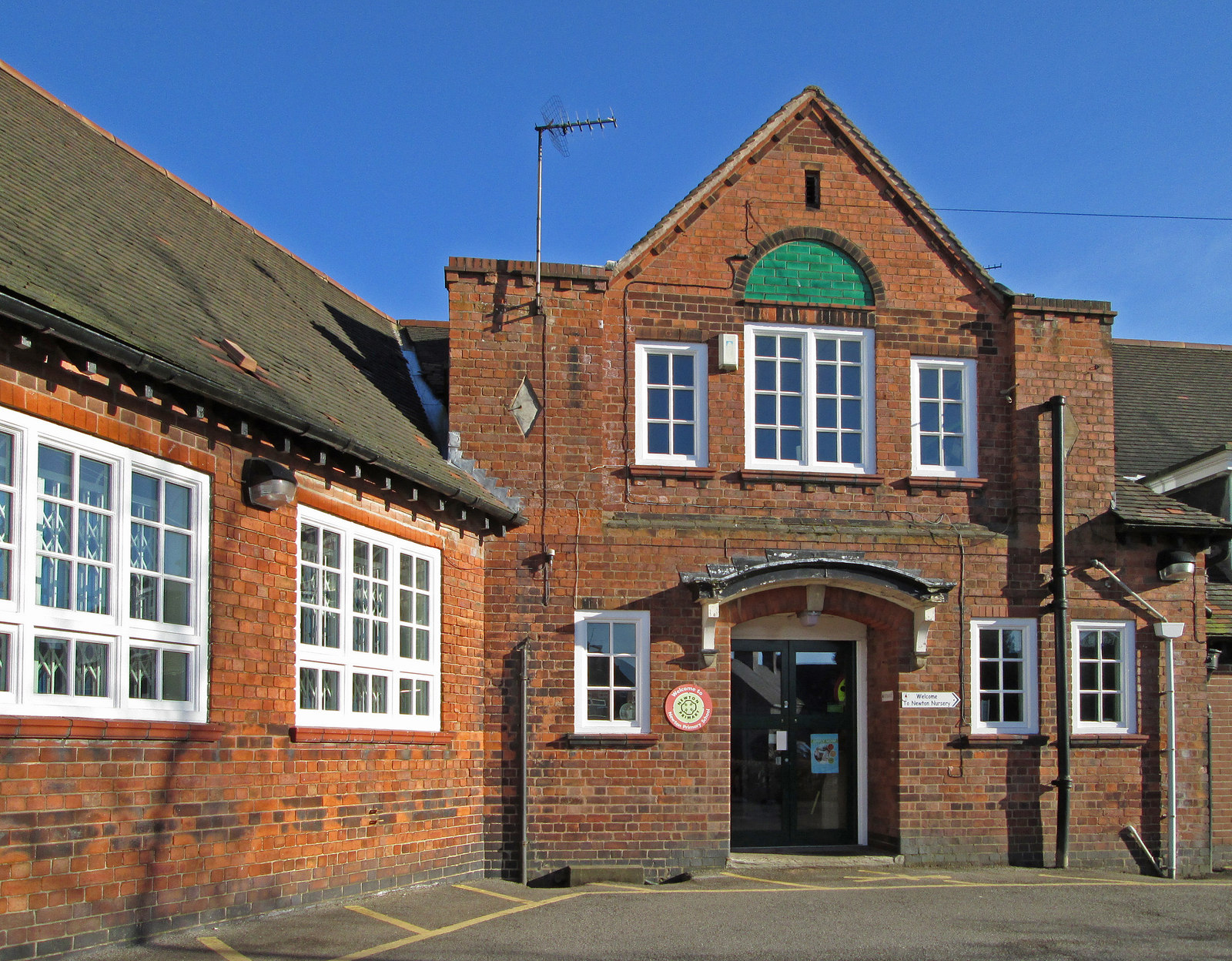
Newton Primary School

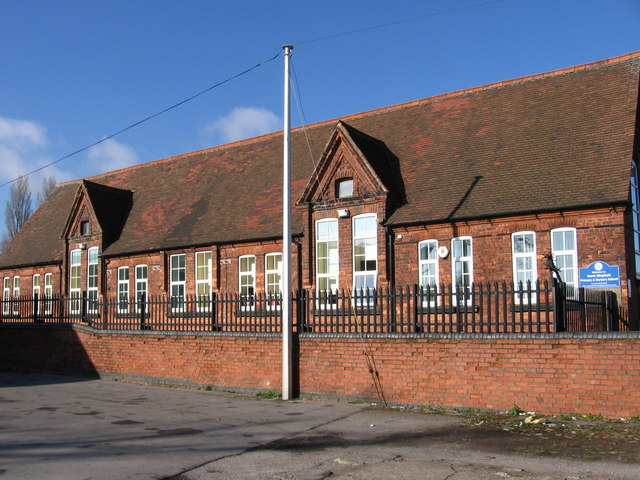
North Wingfield Primary School

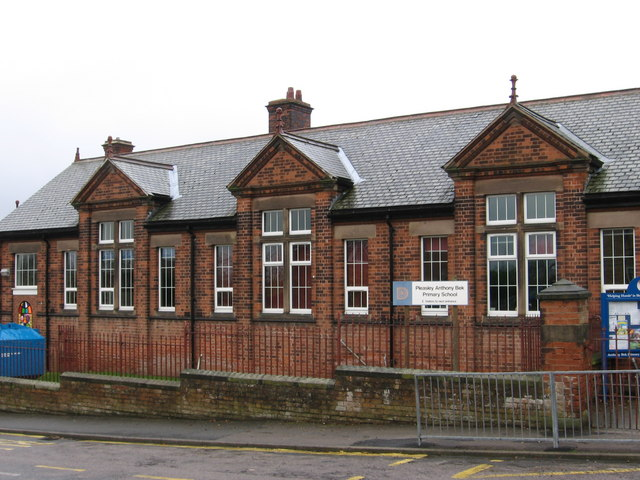
New Houghton – Anthony Bek School

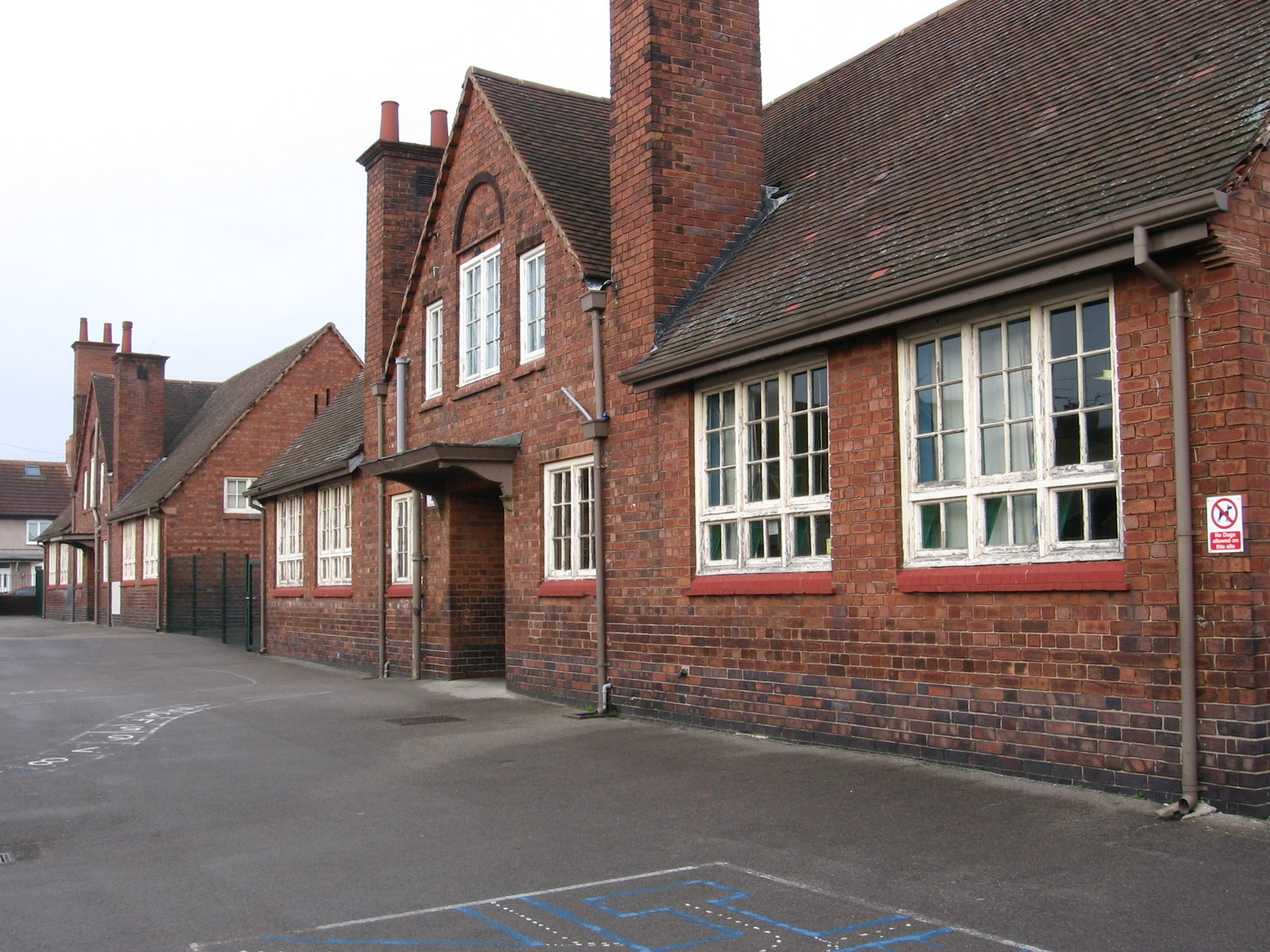
Shirebrook Model Village School

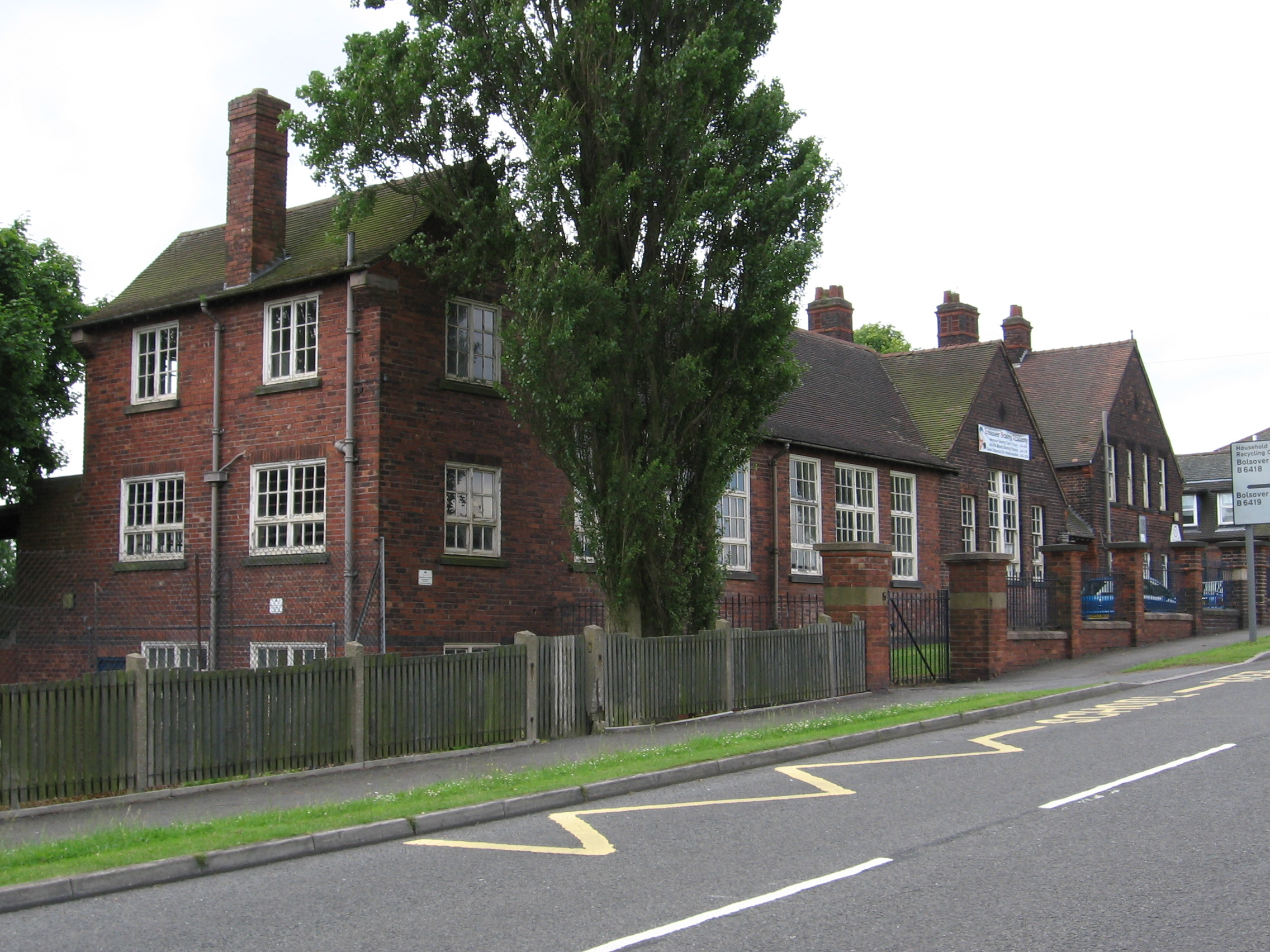
Shuttlewood Brockley Primary School

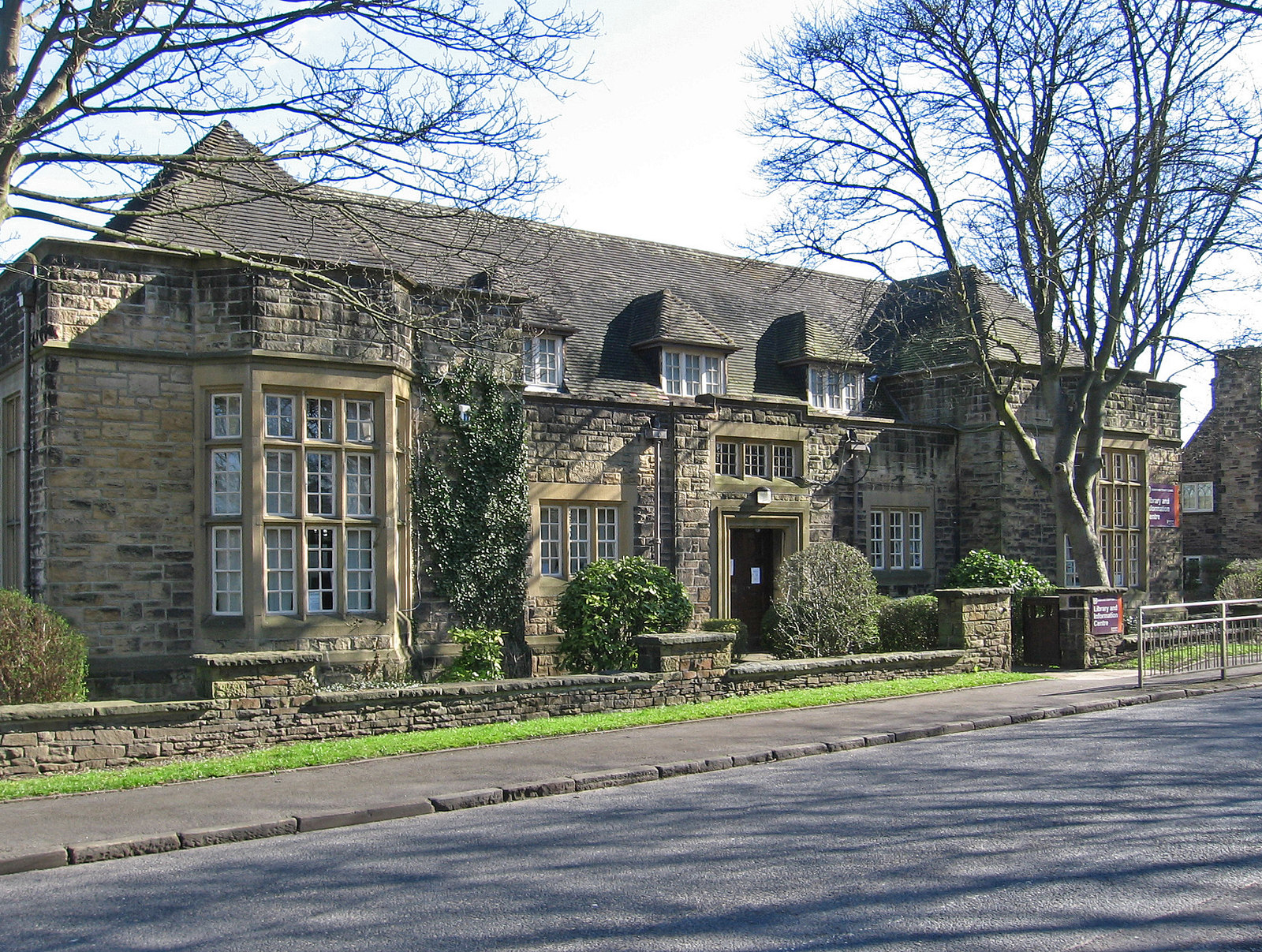
Staveley Library

The following is a list of Derbyshire schools designed by Widdows. It is in placename order and shows the school name, date of building and whether designated a national listed building by English Heritage. In some cases, additional information is provided in italics. The list is based on a search of Derbyshire Historic Environment Records available via the Heritage Gateway website.

- Alfreton Croft Infant School. Built 1906. Listed Grade II. Central Hall, four wings at corners. Near identical plan to The Glebe, South Normanton, except for double main entrances.
- Alfreton Mortimer Wilson Secondary School. Built 1925. Not Listed.
- Bakewell Lady Manners School. Built 1934. Not Listed.
- Blackwell Primary School. Built 1913. Not Listed. School has very tall facades/windows. There is a central hall, twin entrances and gabled classroom wings.
- Bolsover Infants, Built 1906. Not Listed.
- Bolsover New Bolsover Primary School. Built 1935. Not Listed.
- Bramley Vale Primary School. Built 1933. Not Listed.
- Breaston Firfield Primary. Built 1911. Not Listed. The plan form was originally of the "linear" type.
- Buxton College (now Buxton Community School). Extension built 1928/9. Not Listed. Large extensions to a Victorian school. These comprised three veranda-style classroom wings around a courtyard.
- Chesterfield St Helena's Secondary School. Built 1911. Listed Grade II. Not a typical Widdows design.
- Creswell Junior School. Built 1911. Listed Grade II.
- Darley Dale Primary. Built 1911. Listed Grade II.
- Denby John Flamsteed. Built 1925. Not Listed.
- Findern Primary School. Built 1924. Not Listed.
- Heanor Howitt Primary Community School. Built 1915. Not Listed.
- Heanor Marpool Junior School. Built 1906. Not Listed.
- Heanor South East Derbyshire College. Built 1912. Listed Grade II.
- Hope Primary. Built 1912. Listed Grade II.
- Horsley Woodhouse Primary. Built 1913. Not Listed. It is built in a cottage style and has an irregular plan.
- Ilkeston School (King George Avenue). Built 1911. Listed Grade II*. This is the only work of Widdows that has the elevated Grade II* listing status.
- Killamarsh Junior. Building date unknown. Not Listed.
- Long Eaton Community School (Long Eaton County Secondary, Long Eaton Grammar School). Built 1909. Listed Grade II. Large two-storey secondary school.
- Long Eaton Grange Primary School. Built 1935. Not Listed.
- Long Eaton Highfield Primary. Built 1911. Listed Grade II.
- Ludworth Primary School. Built 1908. Not Listed.
- Morton Primary School. Built 1927. Not Listed. School of 1882, rebuilt in 1927 to a design by George Widdows.
- New Mills School, built 1912, listed Grade II. The New Mills Secondary School is identical to Ilkeston School in that it has a large square quadrangular plan with a domed central hall linked by covered walks to the four sides.
- Newton Primary School. Built 1908. Not Listed.
- North Wingfield Infants. Built 1910. Not Listed.
- Palterton Primary School. Built 1908. Not Listed.
- Pleasley Anthony Bek Primary. Built 1936. Not Listed. The later addition to the school was built in 1936 to a design by George Henry Widdows. It has a verandah type, L-shaped plan, with one classroom wing built at right angles to two linked hall blocks.
- Sandiacre Ladycross Infant School. Built 1907. Not Listed. Designed in the Arts & Crafts style.
- Shirebrook Adult Education Centre. Built 1926. Listed Grade II.
- Shirebrook Model Village School. Built 1908. Listed Grade II. It consists of three identical blocks on the 'marching corridor' plan.
- Shuttlewood Brockley Primary. Built 1927. Listed Grade II.
- Somercotes Somerlea Park Junior School. Built 1924. Not Listed.
- South Normanton Glebe. Built 1900. Listed Grade II. Images of England claims that this is probably the earliest school designed by George Widdows. Note that Derbyshire HER record shows building date of 1910 and EH listing shows completion in 1911.
- Staveley Hollingwood Primary School. Built 1927. Not Listed. Now demolished.
- Staveley Library. Built 1932. Not Listed. Although not a school, it was designed by Widdows. Nominated to English Heritage for listing by Derbyshire County Council in 2007.
- Staveley Middlecroft. Built 1927. Not Listed. Now demolished.
- Staveley Netherthorpe School. Built 1929. Listed Grade II. Large extensions designed by George Henry Widdows to the Grade II listed 17th century original school.
- Stonebroom Primary School. Built 1924. Not Listed.
- Swadlincote Springfield Junior. Built 1933. Listed Grade II.
- Swanwick Hall School. Built 1920. Listed Grade II. Widdows created a north courtyard in brick, incorporating new classroom accommodation.
- Tibshelf Infant School. Built 1907. Not Listed. School has a 'marching corridor' plan.
- Tibshelf Town End Junior School. Built 1912. Not Listed.
- Tideswell Bishop Pursglove C of E Primary School. Built 1933. Not Listed.
- Tupton Hall School. Built 1939. Not Listed. School was replaced during WWII, with extensions to the east and south-east by George Henry Widdows. Now demolished.
- West Hallam Scargill C of E Aided Primary School. Built 1921. Not Listed. This school has a 'T' plan and verandah wing to the rear, now much altered.
- Whaley Bridge Primary School. Built 1909. Not Listed. It had a 'T'-plan, with a central hall linking classroom wings, and was constructed of random rubble gritstone walls and red-tiled roofs.
- Whaley Thorns Primary School. Built 1928. Not Listed. It has an intact V-shaped plan of two verandah wings joined by an assembly hall.
- Whittington Moor Infants School. Built 1911. Not Listed. H-plan, tall single storey, central hall block with classroom wings, red brick and plain clay-tiled roofs.
- Wirksworth Junior School. Built 1912. Listed Grade II. It is similar in plan to The Croft, Alfreton and The Glebe, South Normanton, having a central hall with four classroom wings at the corners, although the school at Wirksworth is smaller. It has had little alteration.
- Woodville Junior. Built 1912. Not Listed.
