= The Heath School =

The School

Location
- Clifton Road; Runcorn, Cheshire, WA7 4SY; England; 53.3253°N 2.7256°W

Information
- Type: Academy
- Motto: Latin: Nonest Palma Sine Labore, lit. 'Nothing Earned Without Labour'
- Trust: The Heath Family (North West)
- Department for Education URN: 136779 Tables
- Ofsted: Reports
- Principal: Mark Tudor
- Gender: Coeducational
- Age: 11 to 16
- Enrolment: 1198 as of January 2024
- Capacity: 1200
- Website: heathschool.org.uk

The Heath School is a coeducational secondary school in Runcorn in the English county of Cheshire.

Formerly a community school administered by Halton Borough Council, the school converted to academy status in September 2012. It continues to coordinate with the council for admissions. In April 2016, planning permission was sought for a complete rebuild of the school on the same site. The work was completed in January 2018.

The Heath School offers GCSEs and BTECs as programmes of study for pupils.
