= Ormiston Forge Academy =

Location
- Wrights Lane; Cradley Heath, West Midlands, B64 6QU; England
- Coordinates: 52.47599°N 2.06342°W

Information
- Type: Academy
- Established: 2012
- Authority: Sandwell
- Department for Education URN: 137673 Tables
- Ofsted: Reports
- Principal: Lisa Mason
- Gender: Coeducational
- Age: 11 to 18
- Enrolment: 1,577
- Houses: Bredon, Clent, Malvern, Snowdon
- Website: ormistonforgeacademy.co.uk

Ormiston Forge Academy, formerly Heathfield Foundation Technology College and Heathfield High School, is a secondary school and sixth form with academy status located in the Old Hill area of Cradley Heath, West Midlands, England.

Heathfield High School was built in the 1970s when two local schools Cradley Heath Secondary School, in the Lomey Town area of Cradley Heath, and Macefield Secondary School, in Old Hill, merged. The name of the school was taken from the names of the two schools.

The new building programme of 2008 was completed, with a new hair and beauty salon, seminar rooms, catering rooms and a new sixth form study centre.

As of 2011, the school became an academy sponsored by the Ormiston Academies Trust. The school was then renamed Ormiston Forge Academy.

The school serves pupils living in the Cradley Heath, Old Hill and Rowley Regis areas of Sandwell.

The school has a mountain centre located in Dinas Mawddwy, Gwynedd, North Wales. The building, previously an old school, was converted into accommodation for students when taking part in environmental studies, or some other rural activity. The original mountain centre was located in Llanbrynmair, Powys, Mid-Wales. This was a converted church building.

== Notable former pupils ==
- Tyler Bate, professional wrestler
