= Ormiston Bolingbroke Academy =

Location
- Barnfield Avenue; Runcorn, Cheshire, WA7 6EP; England; 53.3204°N 2.6720°W

Information
- Type: Academy
- Motto: Latin: Lucere Aude, lit. 'Dare to Shine'
- Trust: Ormiston Academies Trust
- Department for Education URN: 136185 Tables
- Ofsted: Reports
- Principal: Kathryn Evans
- Gender: Coeducational
- Age: 11 to 19
- Enrolment: 1011 as of January 2024
- Capacity: 1250
- Website: ormistonbolingbrokeacademy.co.uk

Ormiston Bolingbroke Academy is a coeducational secondary school and sixth form with academy status in Runcorn, Cheshire.

The school is named after Henry Bolingbroke, who became King Henry IV of England. The school is sponsored by the Ormiston Academies Trust.

== History ==
There was a fire on Tuesday 11 October 1983, in the early morning, at the Brookvale school. 100 firemen, 15 fire engines, from as far as Crewe and Nantwich, attended. It took three and a half hours to put out the fire. It destroyed 20 classrooms including science labs, and cost £2m.

=== Formation ===
Brookvale Comprehensive School merged with Norton Priory School and was renamed Halton High School. Halton was converted to academy status in September 2010 and was renamed Ormiston Bolingbroke Academy. Though it is no longer a community school directly administered by Halton Borough Council, Ormiston Bolingbroke Academy continues to coordinate with Halton Borough Council for admissions.

In 2017, the school caused controversy when it banned a student, who had been undergoing cancer treatment, from attending prom due to her lack of school attendance.
