= Jeremiah Yates =

English Chartist and work strike leader

- Born: 1810; Fenton, Staffordshire Potteries, England
- Died: 1852 (aged 42); Crown Bank, Hanley, Staffordshire Potteries, England
- Burial place: St. Mark's, Shelton Parish Church, Staffordshire
- Occupations: Potter, Assistant Surveyor of Highways for Shelton
- Known for: Chartism
- Criminal charges: Riot and Intimidation
- Criminal penalty: 1 year imprisonment, served at Millbank prison, London.
- Spouse: Ann Smith

Jeremiah Yates (1810–1852) was an active Chartist who served a one-year prison sentence for bringing workers out on strike during the 1842 Pottery Riots in England.

Jeremiah Yates, was born in 1810 at Fenton, Staffordshire in the Staffordshire Potteries in England. On his marriage to Ann Smith in 1837, he moved from Stoke to Stafford Row, Miles Bank, Hanley, Staffordshire. He was a potter by trade and owned a coffee house and temperance hotel which he ran with his wife from their house in Miles Bank.

== Chartism ==
During the late 1830s, Jeremiah Yates became an active follower of Chartism, a movement established in 1836, which aimed to gain political rights and influence for the working classes. At that time, due to the failures of the Reform Act 1832 (2 & 3 Will. 4. c. 45), only 18% of the adult population of Britain were allowed to vote. There was also widespread poverty and unemployment and the Poor Law Amendment Act 1834 had deprived working people of outdoor relief, i.e., the right to receive assistance to alleviate poverty without the requirement that the recipient enter an institution. As a result, the poor had to live in workhouses, where families were separated. These injustices helped the Chartist movement to gain massive support, particularly in the north of England.

Jeremiah Yates became a keen advocate of the Chartist cause attending meetings and selling a range of Chartist literature from his coffee house, including 'Commonwealthsman' which he obtained from his friend and leading Chartist Thomas Cooper (poet). In 1843, Jeremiah named his first born son 'Jeremiah Hampden Fitzgerald Emmet Yates' after John Hampden (1594-1643), Lord Edward Fitzgerald (1763–1798) and Richard Emmet (1778-1803) who were prominent Chartist and working class heroes at that time, a practice that continues to this day with Jeremiah Yates' ancestors and the middle name "Hampden".

In 1839, the Chartists presented the British House of Commons with a formal petition, or People’s Charter which had six main demands: a vote for all men (over 21), a secret ballot, no property qualification to become an MP, payment for MPs, electoral districts of equal size and annual elections for Parliament. Although one and a quarter million people had signed the petition, it was rejected by a vote of 235 to 46. A second petition, which also contained demands for freedom from legislation on religion and repeal of the Irish Act of Union 1800, was debated on 5 May 1842. This petition, which had just over 3.3 million signatures, was also rejected by 287 to 49 votes.

== Jeremiah Yates and the 1842 Pottery Riots ==
The rejection of the people's charter by parliament in May 1842 together with growing unemployment, near starvation and wage cuts, led to a wave of strikes in the main industrial areas of Britain which became known as the 1842 General Strike. The Staffordshire potteries saw the worst of the strikes, particularly in Hanley and Burslem in what is now Stoke-on-Trent. The strikes started in early June 1842 by coal miners who had been given a large pay reduction and by the end of July, strikes were endemic across north Staffordshire.

The strikes were championed by the Chartists, who called for a General Strike across the Potteries. On 15 August the Chartists called a meeting at Crown bank, Hanley, to vote on resolutions to the effect that all work would cease "until the People's Charter becomes the law of the land". There were between eight and ten thousand present and after a rousing speech by the prominent Chartist orator, Thomas Cooper the resolution was passed and a groups of men including Jeremiah Yates left the meeting to persuade others to strike.

According to a witness at Jeremiah's trial, on the morning of 15 August, Jeremiah Yates led a 'mob' of 200 (mainly coal miners) to Messrs Ridgway and Marley at Shelton, entered the workshops, stopped all the men from working and 'took them away'.

== Trial and conviction ==
Jeremiah was arrested at work six days later on 21 August. In October 1842, he was found guilty of riot and intimidation and given a prison sentence of one year, which he served at Millbank prison, London.

Jeremiah's sentence was relatively light. While his activities had been peaceable, others engaged in acts of vandalism, destruction and arson. By 16 August, the situation had deteriorated and troops who had been brought in to impose order were ordered to fire on a procession of strikers in Burslem Square. One was killed and many more wounded. The strikers retaliated with attacks on property particularly the houses of coal owners, clergy, magistrates and government buildings. In the special assizes that followed, 274 people were brought to trial, of whom 146 were sent to prison and 54 were transported, for up to 21 years, to Australia.

== After the riots ==
On his release from prison in October 1843, Jeremiah was unable to regain his job in a pottery as a result of his prison sentence and the strong feelings of the employers against the Chartists. Despite this setback, Jeremiah remained an active Chartist, holding Chartist enrollment meetings at his Temperance hotel, campaigning for the release of Chartist prisoners and presiding over Chartist meetings at Crown Bank against the Master and Servants bill and the Irish Registration Bill In 1845 he was elected as a delegate to the Chartist land Conference and in 1848 as delegate to the National Land Company conference in Birmingham. In 1845, he managed to obtain a job as assistant surveyor of highways for Shelton.

After a short illness, Jeremiah died, officially from epilepsy, on 11 October 1852 at the age of 42. He was buried in St Mary's, Shelton Parish Church, Staffordshire. According to his obituary in the Staffordshire Advertiser, 23 October 1852 "His remains ....were followed to the grave by a very large number of his friends who walked in procession. The road from Crown Bank (his place of residence) to the church was lined with spectators and a dense crowd surrounded the burial ground".
