= Staffordshire Potteries =

Historic ceramic-producing region in England

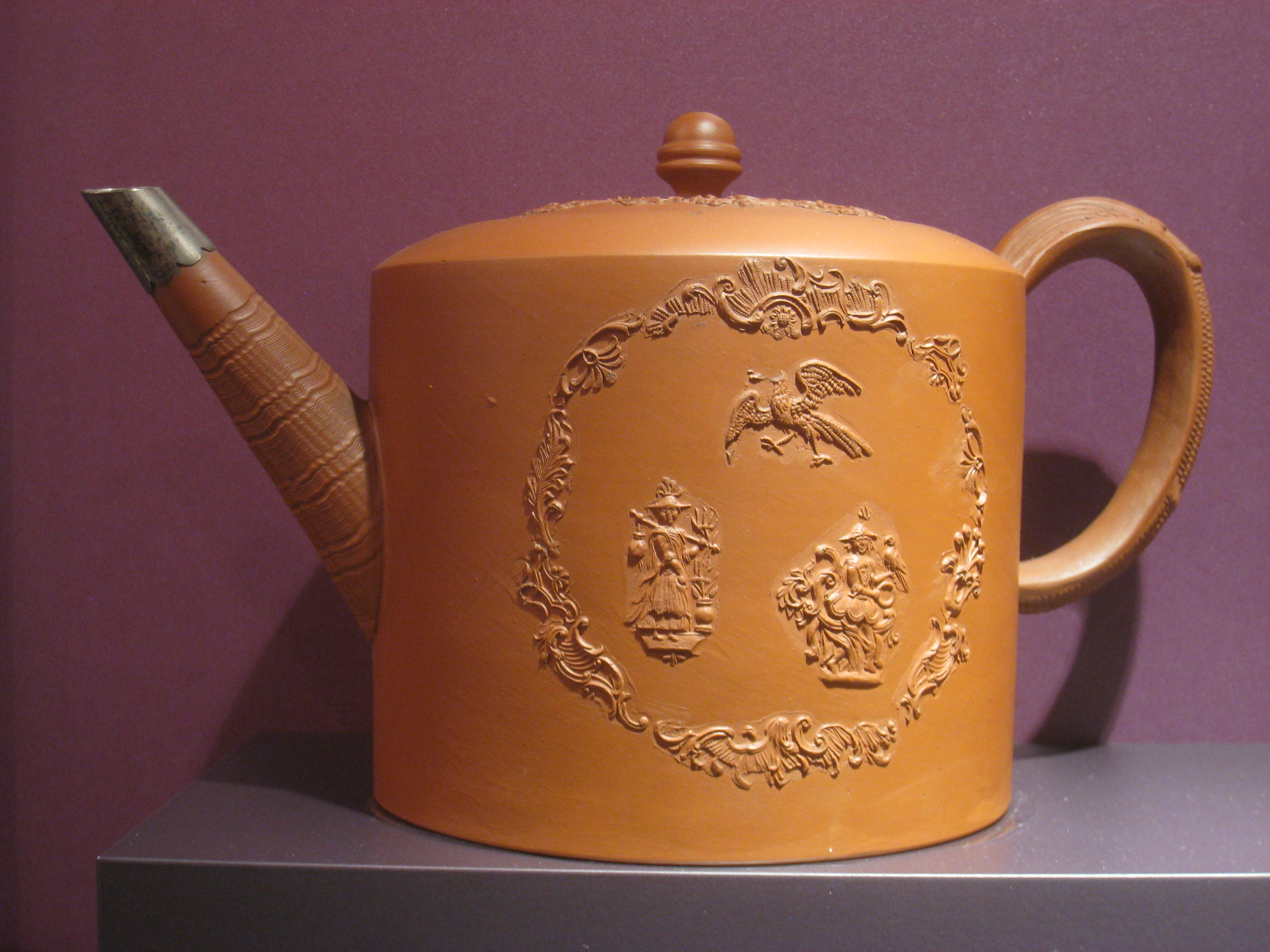
Unglazed stoneware coffee pot, 1750–1775

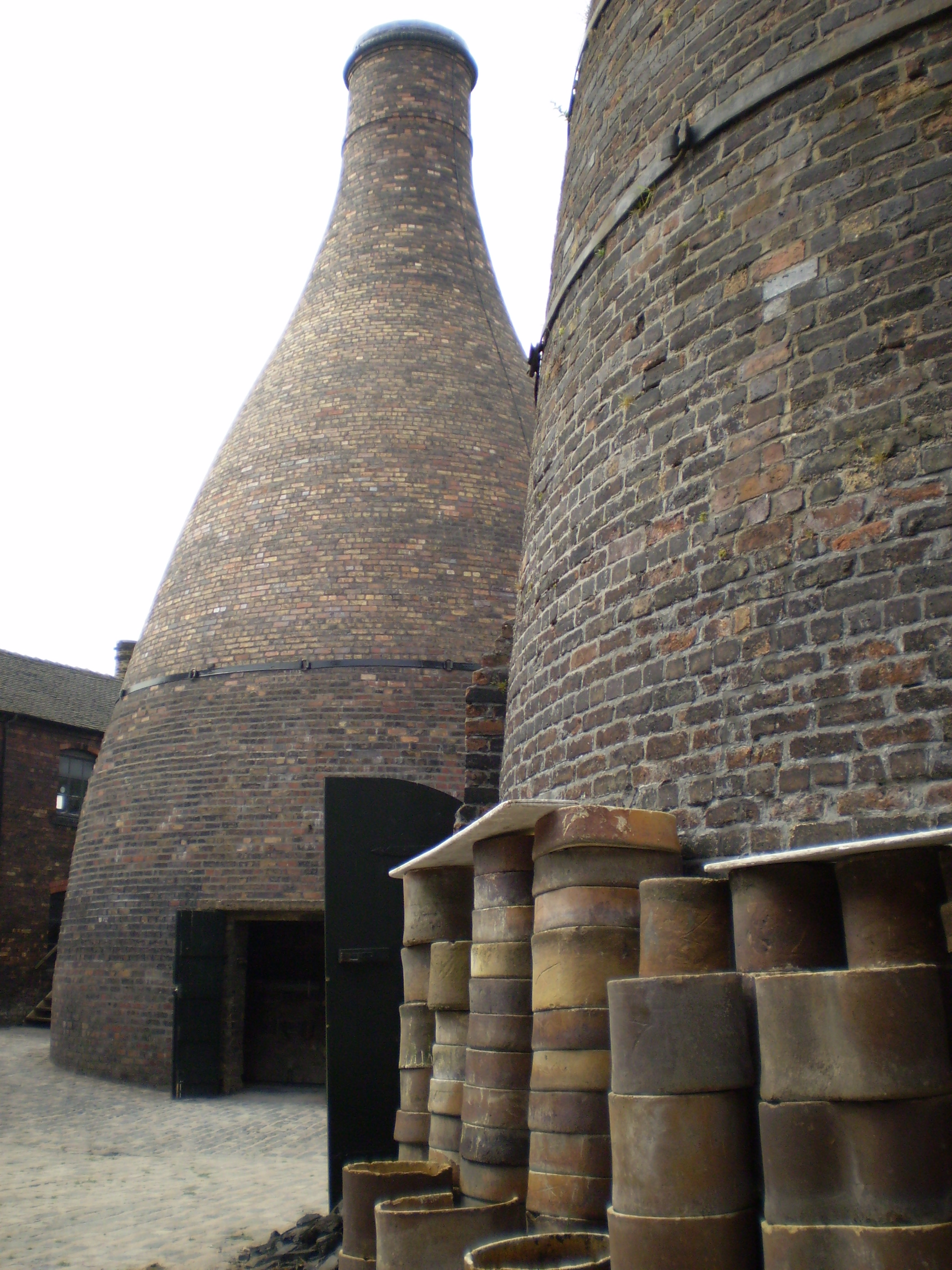
Saggars outside a bottle oven in a pot-bank in Longton

The Staffordshire Potteries is the industrial area encompassing the six towns Burslem, Fenton, Hanley, Longton, Tunstall and Stoke (which is now the city of Stoke-on-Trent) in Staffordshire, England. North Staffordshire became a centre of ceramic production in the early 18th century, due to the local availability of clay, salt, lead and coal.

== Spread ==
Hundreds of companies produced all kinds of pottery, from tablewares and decorative pieces to industrial items. The main pottery types of earthenware, stoneware and porcelain were all made in large quantities, and the Staffordshire industry was a major innovator in developing new varieties of ceramic bodies such as bone china and jasperware, as well as pioneering transfer printing and other glazing and decorating techniques. In general Staffordshire was strongest in the middle and low price ranges, though the finest and most expensive types of wares were also made.

By the late 18th century North Staffordshire was the largest producer of ceramics in Britain, despite significant centres elsewhere, and relied heavily on child labor throughout the production process. Large export markets took Staffordshire pottery around the world, especially in the 19th century. Production began to decline in the late 19th century, as other countries developed their industries. After World War II it declined steeply. Production continues in the area, but at a small fraction of the levels at the peak of the industry.

== History ==
The boom came after the discovery in 1720 by potter John Astbury of Shelton, that by adding heated and ground flint powder to the local reddish clay he could create a more palatable white or Creamware. The flint was sourced from either the South Coast of England or France, then shipped to the Port of Liverpool or to Shardlow on the River Trent. After shipping by pack horses to the watermills local to the potteries, or to commercial flint grinding mills in either the Churnet Valley or Moddershall Valley, it was sorted to remove flint that had reddish hues, then heated to 1,200 °C (2,200 °F) to create an easily ground product. A group involving James Brindley later patented a water-based process that reduced the generation of fine siliceous dust, lessening workers' risk of developing silicosis. In the early 1900s the process was converted to grinding bone, which had a similar effect.

With the coming of pottery products distribution by railway that began in the 1840s, mainly by the London and North Western Railway and Midland Railway, there was a considerable increase in business.

Potteries active in the 19th century include Aynsley, Burleigh, Davenport, Doulton, Dudson, Heron Cross, Mintons, Moorcroft, Spode, Twyford, and Wedgwood.

The Chartist 1842 General Strike was ignited by striking miners at collieries in the Potteries, and led to the 1842 Pottery Riots.

== See also ==
- Category:Staffordshire pottery
- Stoke-on-Trent Built-up Area
- Gladstone Pottery Museum
- Bottle oven
- Ceramic and Allied Trades Union
- Trent and Mersey Canal
- Staffordshire figure
- Staffordshire dog figurine
- Edwin Bennett, apprenticed here together with his brothers
- Arnold Bennett, wrote extensively on the region
