= Fenton Carnegie Library =

Former public library in England

Coordinates: 52.9984°N 2.1628°W

Fenton Carnegie Library is an Edwardian building in Fenton, Staffordshire, England. It was built in 1906 with money from Andrew Carnegie, who had a programme for funding library construction in the United Kingdom and elsewhere. The library was closed in 2012, one of the large number of English libraries that closed around that time as a result of cuts in local government expenditure. In 2018/2019 the building was used for temporary exhibitions.

== Design ==
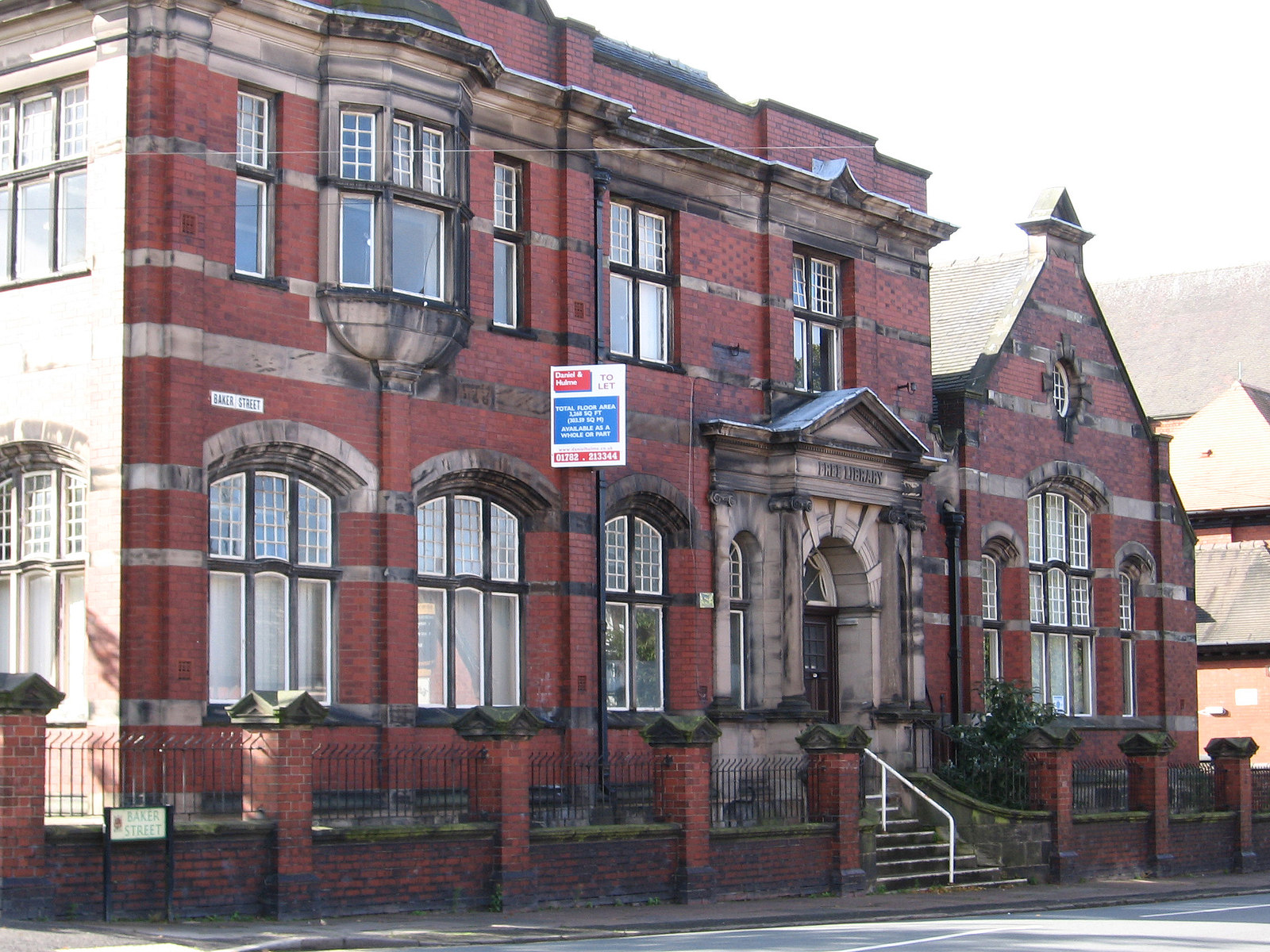
Fenton Carnegie Library

The library is built of red brick with stone dressings. Unlike many Carnegie libraries, it is not a listed building. However, its design includes distinctive features such as a mosaic floor and an oriel window. A feature which is standard in Carnegie libraries is the raised entrance: the steps symbolise the reader's spiritual elevation. At Fenton the entrance is framed by Ionic columns, a borrowing from classical architecture which is found at other Carnegie libraries such as Rawtenstall Library.

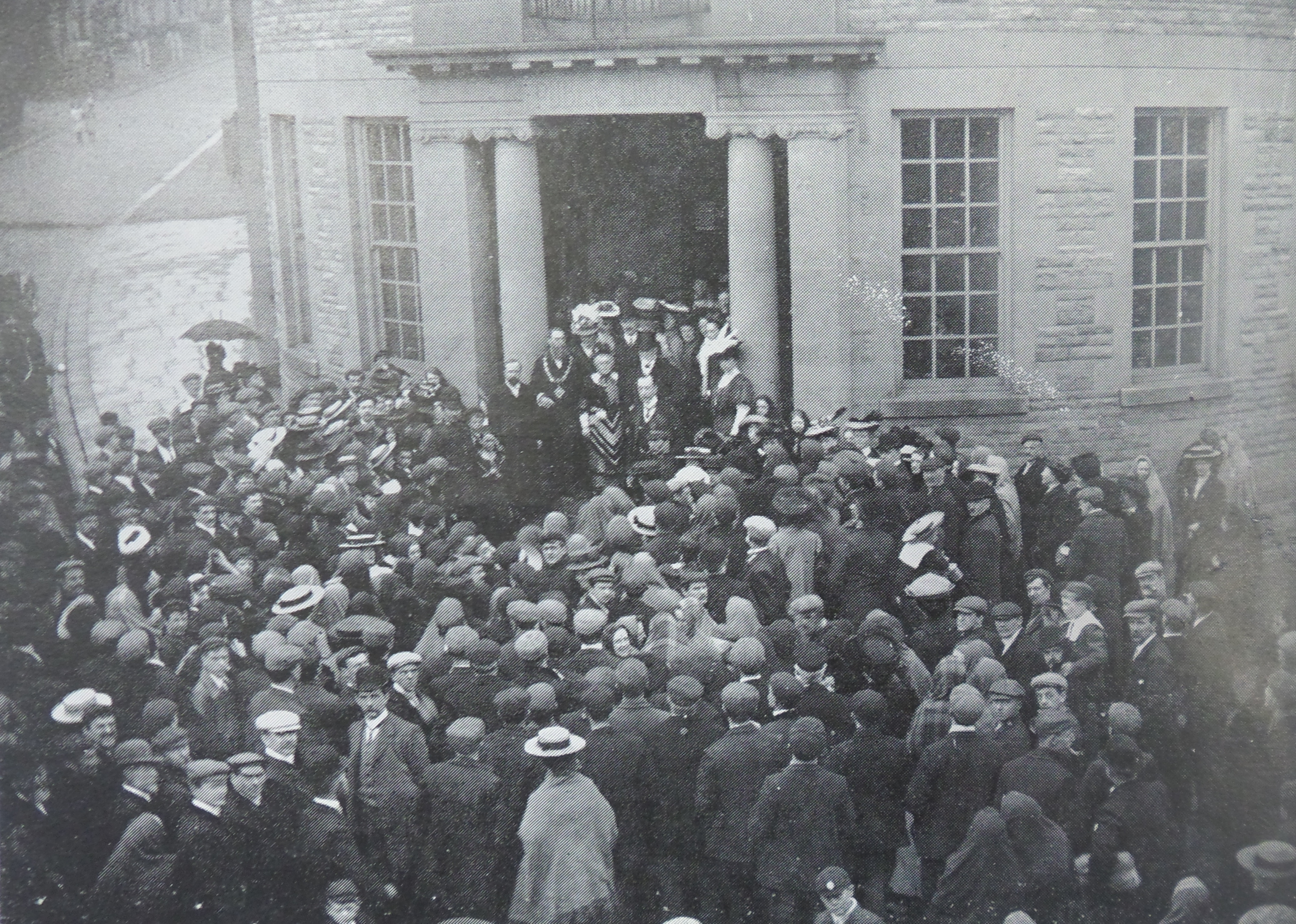
Rawtenstall Library, photographed at its opening in 1907, presents some similarities to Fenton Library

== History ==
The site was a gift from William Meath Baker, a local philanthropist, and a grant of £5,300 from Andrew Carnegie funded the building itself.

In 1906, when the library opened, Fenton was administered as a separate town, although it was part of a conurbation. However, in 1910 Fenton joined with five other towns to form Stoke-on-Trent. The other towns had libraries before Fenton, and Fenton Carnegie Library remained the only Carnegie library in Stoke-on-Trent.

Following the closure of the library in 2012, the building was advertised as being available to let. However, local opinion is reportedly in favour of continued use by the community. It has been used for exhibitions on local history, and there has even been discussion of finding funding to re-establish a library service.
