= Fenton Town Hall =

Municipal building in Fenton, Staffordshire, England

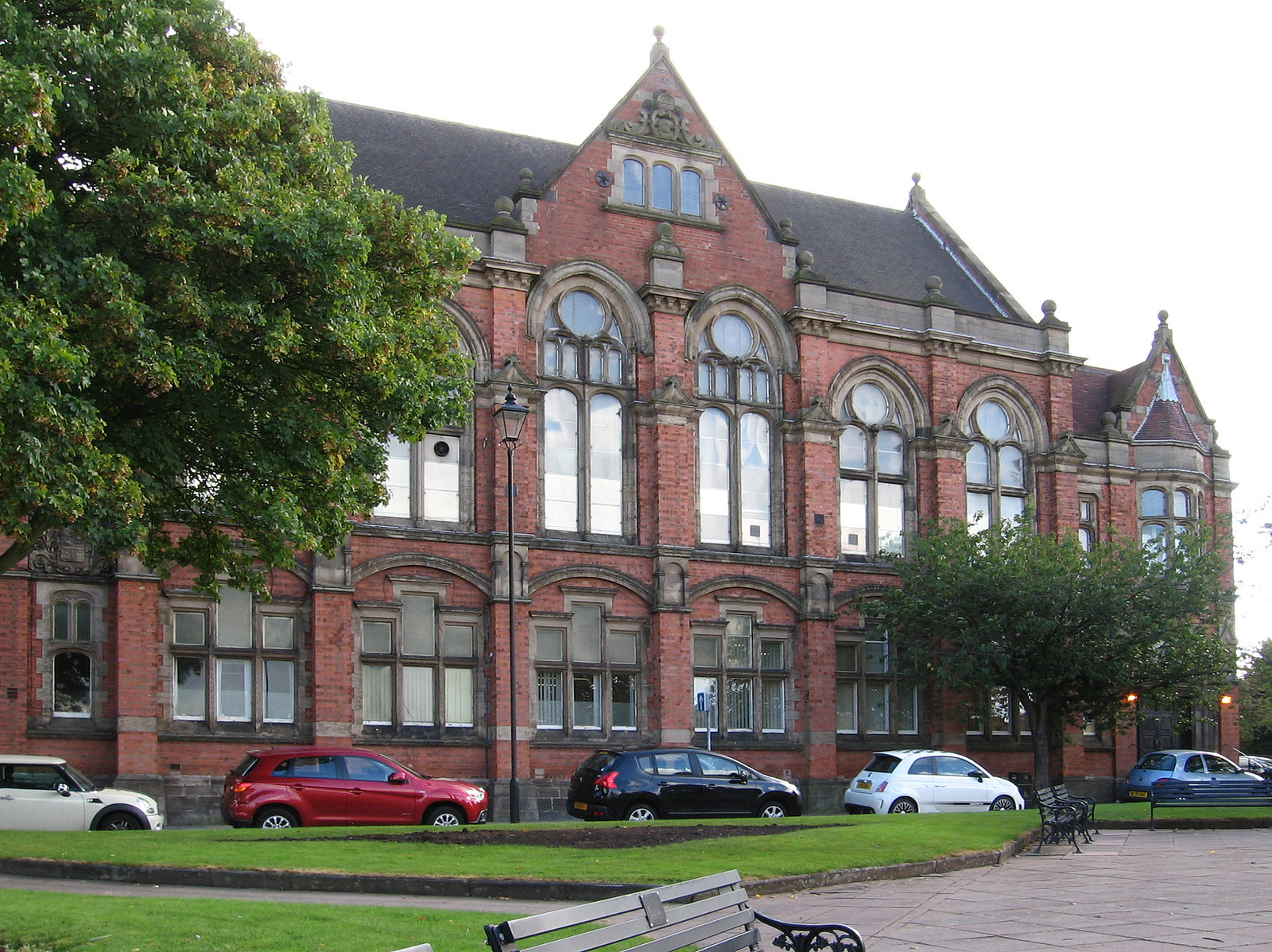
- Fenton Town Hall

- Shown in Staffordshire
- 52.9982°N 2.1637°W
- Location: Albert Square, Fenton

History
- Built: 1889

Site notes
- Architect(s): Robert Scrivener & Son
- Architectural style: Gothic Revival style

Fenton Town Hall is a municipal building in Albert Square in Fenton, Staffordshire, England. It is now occupied by local businesses, a café and an art gallery.

== History ==
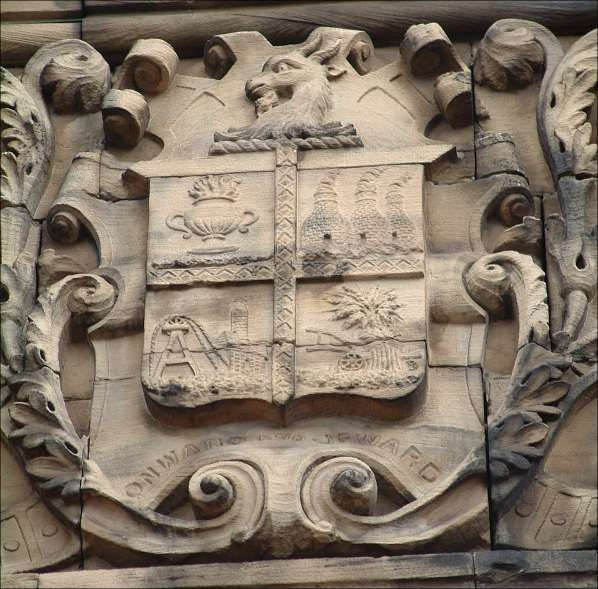
Coat of arms on the front of the building

The building was commissioned by a local pottery proprietor, William Meath Baker, at his own expense on a large site which he provided and then leased to the local board of health. The foundation stone was laid by Baker on 5 July 1888: the building was designed by Robert Scrivener & Son in the Gothic Revival style, built in red brick with stone dressings and was officially opened in December 1889.

The design involved a near-symmetrical main frontage with ten bays facing onto Albert Square; the bays were all flanked by full-height pilasters, supporting a cornice, a parapet and finials. The central section of six bays was fenestrated with tripartite mullioned and transomed windows on the ground floor and tall arched windows with tracery on the first floor. The central two windows on the first floor, which were taller than the others, were surmounted by a gable containing a tripartite window and, above that, a coat of arms. The side wings were each of two bays, not as tall as the central section, but also gabled. The outer bay in the left-hand side wing featured an arched four-part mullioned and transomed window with tracery on the ground floor and an oriel window with by a cone-shaped roof on the first floor. The outer bay in the right-hand side wing featured a doorway with an architrave and a keystone on the ground floor and an oriel window with a cone-shaped roof on the first floor. There was originally a central belfry with a spire on the roof. Internally, the principal room was the ballroom which featured a fine vaulted ceiling. The architectural historian, Nikolaus Pevsner, commented favourably on the "little originalities which help to relieve the portliness of the building".

Following significant population growth, largely associated with the potteries, the area became an urban district in 1894. The new urban district council purchased the town hall from Baker for use as its headquarters in 1897. A public library, financed with a grant from the philanthropist, Andrew Carnegie, and designed by F. R. Lawson was erected to the east of the town hall, but within the boundaries of the site, in 1906. The town hall ceased to be the local seat of government when the Federation of Stoke-on-Trent was formed in March 1910. A police station, also designed by Robert Scrivener & Son, was erected between the town hall and the public library in 1914. The town hall was subsequently converted for use as the main magistrates' court for the area and the police station was converted for use as the magistrates' clerks' office.

A war memorial, in the form of an obelisk, which was intended to commemorate the lives of local service personnel who had died in the First World War, was unveiled outside the town hall in the presence of Brigadier-General John Campbell VC, on 11 November 1922. Another memorial, in the form of a plaque created from Minton tiles and listing the names of 498 local service personnel, was installed inside the building. During the Second World War, as part of the local fund-raising effort for Wings for Victory Week in April 1943, a Spitfire was parked outside the town hall.

The building continued to serve as a venue for magistrates' court hearings until the courts service relocated to Newcastle-under-Lyme and the building fell vacant in December 2012. In 2013, the Victorian Society listed the building as the fifth most endangered building in England and Wales. Then, in November 2014, protestors from a local action group, who had occupied the building in an attempt to frustrate Ministry of Justice's proposals to sell the building, were served with an eviction order. In February 2015, the building was acquired by Baker & Co., the pottery business founded by William Baker: the company let parts of the building to local businesses, a café and an art gallery. A programme of works to restore the ballroom and to reveal its original vaulted ceiling was carried out with financial support from Arts Council England and completed in 2021.
