= Heron Cross Pottery =

Pottery in Stoke-on-Trent, England

Coordinates: 52.9933°N 2.1598°W

Heron Cross Pottery was a pottery manufactory built in 1886 in Fenton, Stoke-on-Trent, England, by the firm Hines Brothers (William Hines and Thomas Hines), particularly known for making the classic brown earthenware teapots and tea services for the London Midland and Scottish Railway. A portion of it is now a Grade II listed building. The business was taken over in 1907 by Grimwades, and became the Kensington Pottery in Hanley in about 1922; this pottery continued until 1937.

During the Second World War, the building was requisitioned and used for storage of both food and munitions.

== William Hines ==
It is understood that in about 1850 William Hines was born either in Ellesmere, Shropshire or in St Oswalds, Welsh Marches. He married Mary Mellor on 10 March 1875 and remarried when she died (reportedly not until the evening of his marriage telling his second wife that he already had six children). He became a prominent rider in the North Staffordshire Hunt and owner of a stable of horses. He spent considerable money building Wesleyan chapels. There is a Hines Street in Fenton.
