= 1842 Preston strike =

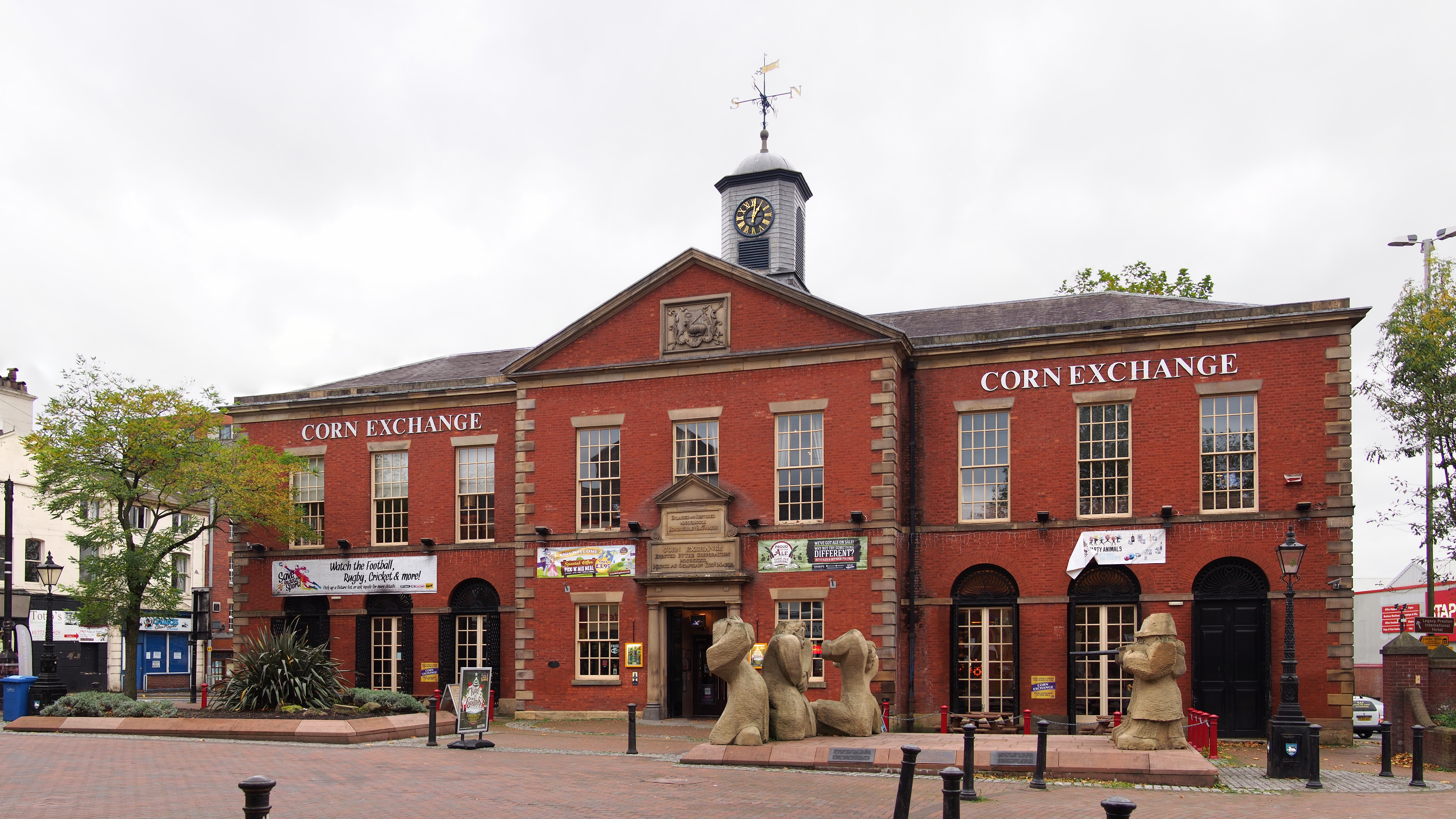
Preston Corn Exchange, in front of which the final confrontation took place. The Preston Martyrs' Memorial is in the right foreground.

The Preston Strike and Lune Street Riot, which took place in Preston, in Lancashire, England over 12 and 13 August 1842, were part of the 1842 General Strike or ‘Plug Plot Riots’. These strikes and disturbances were prompted by depression in 1841–1842 which resulted in wage cuts of over 25%.

== Background ==
These strikes and disturbances were prompted by depression in 1841–1842 which resulted in wage cuts of over 25%. They were influenced by the Chartist movement and the government's rejection of the petition for People's Charter of 1838. The charter had set out the movement's six main aims.

== The Preston Strike ==
The strike began on Friday 12 August 1842, after a large meeting of around 3,000 cotton workers at Chadwick's Orchard – now the site of Preston's Covered Market. They pledged to "strike work until they had a fair days wages for that work, guaranteeing its continuance with the Charter." The Chartist newspaper The Northern Star reported that "Before night every cotton mill was turned out without resistance—all done chiefly by boys and girls".

The next day news spread that some mills had resumed work. The remaining strikers met in Chadwick's Orchard on Saturday morning, as early as 6am and then started moving through Preston from factory to factory. "Some windows were broken and several policemen hurt".

== Samuel Horrocks, Junior, Mayor of Preston, 1842 ==
Samuel Horrocks was a member of the Horrocks family which had risen to prominence in Preston in the 1790s through the cotton trade. His uncle John and father Samuel Horrocks founded Horrockses which, by 1842, was Preston's largest cotton manufacturer. The family had become very wealthy and both John and Samuel Horrocks had served as Members of Parliament until their deaths in 1804 and 1842 respectively.

== The final confrontation ==
On Saturday 13 August the strikers moved into the centre of town to Messrs Paley's Mill where they met Preston officials accompanied by about 30 soldiers from the 72nd Highlanders and members of the County and Borough police. Their final confrontation was on the bottom of Lune Street outside the Preston Corn Exchange. Members of the crowd including men, women and boys gathered stones from near the canal and began throwing them at the police and military.

The mayor, Samuel Horrocks, read the Riot Act. This gave local authorities the right to use force if necessary to disperse unlawful assemblies and stop riots. When the violence escalated and the crowd did not disperse the military then fired, and four of the demonstrators were killed and three others were injured.

The four men who died were:

- John Mercer, aged 27 of Ribbleton Lane, a handloom weaver. Mercer had a ball shot through his right arm, through his fifth rib and through his chest and out of the left side of the spine.
- William Lancaster, aged 25 of Blackburn. He was wounded by a musket ball entering his chest and passing under the fourth rib on the left side.
- George Sowerbutts, aged 19 of Chandler Street, a weaver at Gardner's Mill. He died from his injuries on Sunday evening.
- Bernard McNamara, aged 17 of Birk Street, a cotton stripper employed at Oxendale's Mill, was shot through the right side of the belly, from which the bowels protruded to a great extent. He died on Monday afternoon at about 1.30pm.

Those injured included:

- William Pilling aged 21, a steam loom operator, who was struck by a bullet in the knee and taken to the Dispensary on Fishergate were his leg was amputated.
- James Roberts, aged 20, a steam loom operator, who was struck in the hand which as a result was amputated.
- Bryan Hodgson a shoe maker from St Peter's Square, who was shot in the back and had a bullet lodged in his spine. Despite this he survived and lived until 1878.

== Reaction to the shooting ==
Opinion was divided about the shooting. Some, including the Mayor, thought it was justified but regretted the loss of life. The Northern Star summed up the Chartist reaction to the shooting:

People could scarcely believe their senses. Riots had happened before in Preston but never before had the military been ordered to fire. Another attachment of the 7th Rifle Brigade, about 150 in number were marched into town, and the 72nd were marched out, no doubt to stem popular fury, it being the almost unanimous opinion that the Mayor ought to be tried for wilful murder.

Inquests into the deaths, by a local jury, were held in Preston at the county court where Richard Palmer acted as coroner. After hearing the evidence all four deaths were ruled to be "justified homicide".

== The 1842 Memorial ==
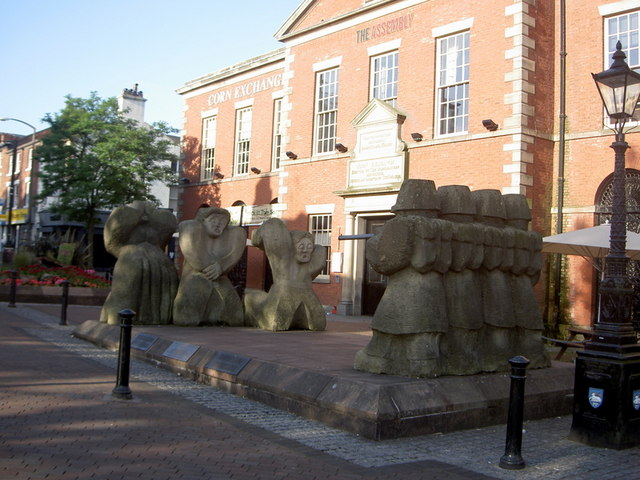
The Preston Martyrs Memorial, Lune Street

A permanent memorial in memory of the cotton workers was unveiled on Lune Street on 13 August 1992, the 150th anniversary of the shooting. The memorial was designed and produced by the British artist and sculptor Gordon Young. It was inspired by Goya's painting The Third of May 1808 picturing Spanish civilians being executed in 1808 for resisting Napoleon’s troops.

== The Preston Passion ==
The Lune Street shooting and the story of Mayor Samuel Horrocks inspired one of the Preston Passion dramas, "Preston 1842", which was screened live on television as part of the 2012 Preston Passion event.
