= Preston Passion =

- Starring: Fern Britton (host)
- Country of origin: United Kingdom

Production
- Producer: BBC
- Running time: 59 minutes

Original release
- Network: BBC One
- Release: 6 April 2012

The Preston Passion was a live performance televised by BBC One on 6 April 2012 from Preston, Lancashire, England, retelling the Gospel accounts of the Crucifixion of Jesus through a filter of local history. Organized by the Preston Guild, the performance utilized professional performers, local volunteers and audience members.

== Background ==
The Preston Passion takes its name from the Passion of Christ, a term widely used to encapsulate the events of the capture, trial and death of Jesus of Nazareth as described in the Gospels and celebrated by Christians at Easter. It follows a tradition of Passion plays that are performed in many parts of the world over Easter.

== Performance ==
In the dramas, three aspects of the Biblical narratives are retold through three events from the history of Preston, with the story of Pontius Pilate being related to the events of the Preston Strike of 1842, the story of Mary, the mother of Jesus related to the experiences of a local soldier in World War I, and that of Jesus being to related the sacrifice of a local school-girl caring for her younger siblings.

Singer Jamelia sang in the finale, replacing Heather Small who had to withdraw because of illness. The hymns and songs were sung by a large choir made up from parishes in and around Preston and UCLAN Chamber Choir. The pieces included William Horsley's There is a Green Hill Far Away, Jerusalem, Surely He Hath Borne Our Griefs (from Handel's Messiah), When I Survey the Wondrous Cross, Were You There and You've Got the Love.

== Awards ==
In November 2012 the Preston Passion won the award for "Best Live Event" at the Royal Television Society's North West Awards.

== Programme credits ==
- Executive Producer – Aaqil Ahmed
- Development Executive – Pat Connor
- Development Producer – Steve Rawling

=== Drama ===
- Mrs Melling – Samantha Bond
- Samuel Horrocks – Tom Ellis
- Amy Cummins – Christine Bottomley
- Bishop Crowther – Ronald Pickup
- Betty Cleasby – Pooky Quesne
- Simon – Paul Barber
- Bella's Mother – Julia Haworth
- Scott – Lucas Burridge
- Presenter – Fern Britton
- Performer – Jamelia
- Writers – Colin Heber-Percy and Lyall Watson
- Director – Daniel Wilson
- Producer – Sandra Maciver
- Executive Producer – Hilary Martin
- Bella – Aimie Leach

=== Live event ===
- Live Event Director – Mark Murphy
- Outside Broadcast Producer and Director – Pamela Hossick
- Creative Producer – Mike Smith
- Production – Walk the Plank

== See also ==
- York Mystery Plays
