= 1842 general strike =

General strike in Britain

1842 United Kingdom general strike
- Plug Plot Riots; Part of Chartist movement
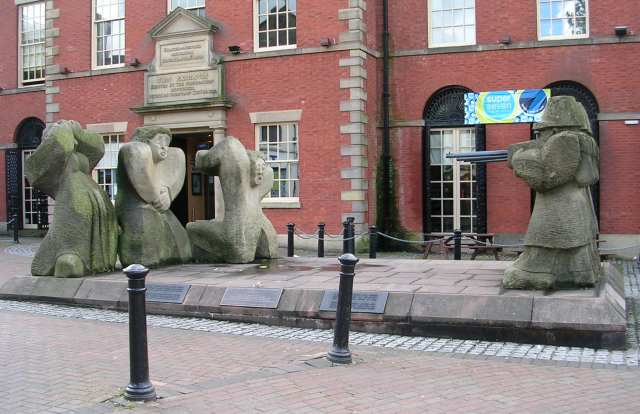
- Statue commemorating the Plug Plot Riots outside the Corn Exchange in Preston
- Date: July–September 1842
- Location: United Kingdom
- Caused by: Rejection of second Chartist Petition; wage cuts; economic depression
- Goals: Restoration of wage levels; ten-hour working day; implementation of the People's Charter
- Methods: General strike, mill closures, "turning out" workers
- Result: Strike suppressed; wage cuts prevented; mass arrests; Factory Act 1844 passed

Parties
Striking workers: Chartists; Mill workers; Coal miners; Factory workers	Government of the United Kingdom: Sir Robert Peel's Conservative government; Local magistrates; British Army; Special constables

Lead figures
Alexander Hutchinson; Charles Stuart; Peter McDouall; Thomas Cooper	Robert Peel; Sir James Graham; Samuel Horrocks

Number
Up to 500,000 workers	Multiple army regiments, thousands of special constables

Casualties and losses
At least 10 killed	Unknown

Casualties
- Deaths: At least 10
- Injuries: Numerous wounded
- Arrested: Over 1,500 in North-West England alone
- Damage: Extensive mill and factory closures
- Buildings destroyed: Hundreds of mills forced to close
- Detained: Mass arrests across affected regions
- Charged: Over 1,500 prosecuted
- Fined: Various penalties imposed
- Political impact: Factory Act 1844; reorganisation of policing

The 1842 general strike in the United Kingdom, also known as the Plug Plot Riots, was a general strike that lasted from July to September 1842. The strike started among the miners in Staffordshire, England, and soon spread through Britain affecting factories, mills in Yorkshire and Lancashire, and coal mines from Dundee to South Wales and Cornwall.

The strike was influenced by the Chartist movement - a mass working-class movement from 1838 to 1848. After the second Chartist petition was presented to Parliament in May 1842, it was rejected by the House of Commons. The strike spread to involve nearly half a million workers throughout Britain and represented what historian Mick Jenkins called "the most massive industrial action to take place in Britain - and probably anywhere - in the nineteenth century".

== Origins ==
The strike emerged from the intersection of severe economic conditions and political frustration. From 1841, Britain experienced a significant economic depression, with factory owners cutting wages by up to 25% between 1840 and June 1842. The cotton industry entered what economic historians describe as "a slump of unprecedented proportions" towards the end of 1841, with widespread unemployment.

The Industrial Revolution had created a new industrial working class consisting of approximately 350,000 textile workers, 120,000 coal miners, and 400,000 metal workers, mostly concentrated in Lancashire, Cheshire, Yorkshire and Staffordshire. These workers endured poor working conditions, unpredictable wages, and no job security.

By 1842, Britain had experienced over 5 consecutive periods of significant trade stagnation. This was mainly caused by the American financial panic of 1837. The reason this crisis had affected Britain was because America primarily purchased British goods, such as textiles from Glasgow. The financial crisis also caused America to be unable to buy any manufactured goods from the United Kingdom, which put a dent in their export economy.

The political catalyst came with Parliament's rejection of the second Chartist petition in May 1842. This petition contained over 3.3 million signatures and was physically massive - sheets of signatures were stitched into a single roll weighing six hundredweight (over 300kg). The petition demanded the implementation of the People's Charter, which called for universal male suffrage, secret ballot, equal electoral districts, payment of MPs, abolition of property qualifications for MPs, and annual elections. The House of Commons rejected the petition by 287 votes to 49.

== Civil unrest ==
The first continuous striking began on 18 July 1842, in Hanley, Staffordshire, when coal miners assembled and swore not to resume work until wages and working conditions were improved. The miners linked their economic demands with political ones, with a meeting passing a resolution stating that "nothing but the People's Charter can give us a fair day's wage for a fair day's work".

The strike intensified in South East Lancashire in response to demands for a 25% wage cut for cotton workers in Ashton-under-Lyne and Stalybridge. On 7 August, mass meetings of workers from Ashton and Stalybridge were held Mottram Moor, where support was given for a "Grand National Turn-Out" to begin on 8 August. Support for the Charter was incorporated into the resolutions passed.

On 8 August, the turn-out began as workers left their factories and moved from workplace to workplace, "turning out" other workers to join them. The derogatory name "plug plot" derives from this period, as workers systematically pulled the plugs out of or pushed them into steam boilers, sending water onto the floor and steam into the air, bringing the engines to an instant stop.

On 13 August 1842, roving groups of workers carried the stoppage first to the whole area of Stalybridge and Ashton, then to Manchester, and subsequently to towns adjacent to Manchester including Preston, using force where necessary to bring mills to a standstill.

The Preston Strike of 1842 resulted in violence when four men were shot on 13 August at Lune Street after Mayor Samuel Horrocks read the Riot Act. The West Riding of Yorkshire saw disturbances at Bradford, Huddersfield and Hunslet. At least six people died in riots at Halifax.

== Organisation and leadership ==
The strikers organised through a series of trades conferences across the affected regions. The most significant was the Manchester Trades Conference, planned for 15 and 16 August. This was preceded by meetings across the region as groups of workers elected and instructed their delegates.

The Trades Conference opened on Monday 15 August at the Sherwood Inn, Manchester. Alexander Hutchinson, representing the Manchester wiredrawers and card makers, was elected chairman. Charles Stuart, representing the mechanics of Patricroft, was elected secretary. By lunchtime, the conference had adjourned to meet again at Carpenters Hall, the first venue proving too small.

The conference overwhelmingly voted to endorse both the Charter and a return to 1840 wage rates. Leadership was otherwise decentralised, with local leaders playing crucial roles in their respective areas.

Women played a significant role in the strike. Contemporary accounts describe their tenacity and courage, with women gathering early in the morning to march and pull plugs at mills. In some instances, when strikers arrived to "turn out" workers, women and girls joined the strike while men remained at work.

== Government response ==
The government of Sir Robert Peel responded with considerable force. From the moment the National Charter Association issued its first address supporting the strike, it became a national movement. In response, the government mobilised troops including the Grenadier Guards backed by artillery, the 34th regiment of foot, and the 73rd regiment, which were ordered north.

Home Secretary Sir James Graham forged local police and soldiers into a unified force of repression. By 20 August, Chairman Alexander Hutchinson and many other union and Chartist leaders had been arrested.

The repression was described by historian Mick Jenkins as "unmatched in the nineteenth century".

== Trials ==
In the North-West alone, over 1,500 strikers were brought to trial. Fifty-nine leaders of the campaign were tried the following year in London, while 1,500 more strikers were tried in local courts across the country.

=== Glasgow General Strike Trials ===
1842 Glasgow General Strike Trials were the criminal prosecution of Scottish labour organisers in Glasgow following these industrial disputes, in the context of economic depression and mass unemployment.

== Aftermath ==
The strike began to collapse following the arrest of key leaders and the dispersal of the Trades Conference delegates. Lancashire and Cheshire saw the strikers stay out longest, with Manchester power loom weavers only returning to work on 26 September 1842.

Almost all factories cancelled proposed wage cuts and in many cases restored salaries to 1840 levels. The Factory Act 1844 was subsequently passed, which improved working conditions for women and children. The Act reduced working hours for children between eight and thirteen to six and a half hours per day, and limited working hours for young persons and women to no more than twelve hours for the first five days of the week, and nine on Saturday.

However, broader political reform did not occur immediately. The Chartist movement survived and later reached its peak of influence in 1848, while trade unions continued to organise, though they would not be legalised until 1871.

== Historical analysis ==
Historians have debated the political nature and significance of the 1842 strike. One perspective suggests that the movement remained, to outward appearances, largely non-political, with resolutions typically focusing on restoration of wages, ten-hour working days, or reduced rents.

In contrast, historian Mick Jenkins offers a Marxist interpretation which views the strike as fundamentally political and linked to the Chartist movement. Jenkins argues that "what clearly emerges... is the changing character of the strike - an understanding that the main aim of the strike was for the People's Charter".

Historian John Foster argues that Jenkins' account compels historians to reassess crucial aspects of Britain's political development, particularly regarding why universal suffrage was withheld for so long and how working-class demands for democratic representation were successfully resisted.

Modern historians have recognised the strike's significance. Dorothy Thompson described 1842 as "a year in which more energy was hurled against the authorities than in any other of the 19th century".

== Legacy ==
The 1842 general strike demonstrated both the potential power of organised working-class action and the state's determination to suppress challenges to the existing order. It was the first time that economic and political demands were successfully combined on such a scale, establishing a template for future labour movements.

The events of 1842 also led to significant changes in how the state managed protest and labour unrest, including the development of more sophisticated policing strategies and intelligence gathering.

== See also ==
- 1842 Pottery Riots - concurrent disturbances in the pottery industry
- Chartist movement - the broader political movement
- Preston Strike of 1842 - specific local events
- 1926 United Kingdom general strike - later general strike
- People's Charter - the political demands
- Factory Acts - resulting legislation
