= William Meath Baker =

English pottery owner and high sheriff (1857–1935)

William Meath Baker (1 November 1857 – 15 January 1935) was an English pottery owner, benefactor, landowner and High Sheriff.

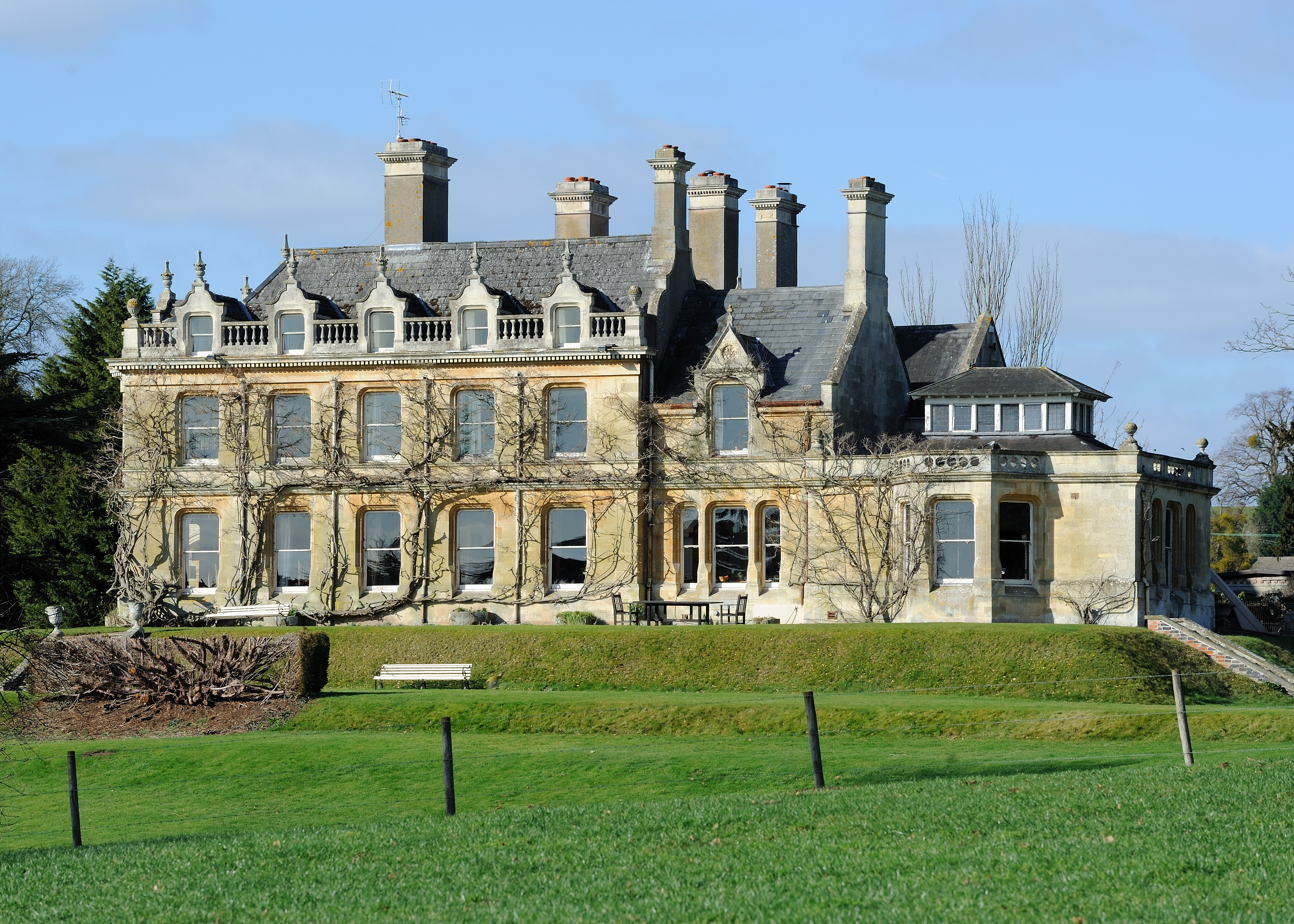
Hasfield Court, Gloucestershire

He was born in Hilderstone, Staffordshire, the son of the Revd. Ralph Bourne Baker and his wife Francis Crofton Singer, daughter of Joseph Henderson Singer, Bishop of Meath. He was educated at Eton College and Trinity College, Cambridge. In 1875, at the age of 18, he succeeded his father to the family pottery works of William Baker and Co in Fenton, Staffordshire and the country house of Hasfield Court in Gloucestershire. His father had inherited both properties from his unmarried elder brother William in 1865.

William Meath Baker established himself as a country squire at Hasfield, having little active involvement in the management of the Fenton pottery, and serving as a JP for Gloucestershire and High Sheriff for 1896–97. He was a keen mountain climber and his obituary appeared in the 1935 edition of the Alpine Journal despite him never having been a member of the Alpine Club.

He was loyal to his Staffordshire roots and in the late 1880s funded at his own expense the building of Fenton Town Hall and other buildings in the town.

He was a close friend and patron of the composer Edward Elgar and is the "W.M.B." on whom Variation No IV of his Enigma Variations, composed in 1899, was based. The variation reflected Baker's impetuous and volatile nature. Two other variations were based on other members of the Baker family.

The Enigma Variations, Variation IV, "W.M.B"
Performed by the Hallé Orchestra, conducted by Sir John Barbirolli

The Fenton Pottery business ceased trading in 1932 during the Great Depression.

He died in 1935. He had married twice, to Hannah Corbet in 1884 (who died in 1906) and secondly Sybill Wyrley-Birch in 1909. He had three sons by his first wife. Hasfield Court passed to his second son, Francis Ralph, his eldest son having become a Roman Catholic priest.
