= 1842 Pottery Riots =

1842 riots in Staffordshire, England

Predominantly centred on Hanley and Burslem, in what became the federation of Stoke-on-Trent, the 1842 Pottery Riots took place in the midst of the 1842 General Strike, and both are credited with helping to forge trade unionism and direct action as a powerful tool in British industrial relations.

== Cause ==
The riots took place against the backdrop of the 1842 general strike, started by colliers of the North Staffordshire Coalfield in the Potteries, and part of the popular working class Chartist movement. The spark that lit both the general strike and Pottery Riots was the decision, in early June 1842, by W. H. Sparrow, a Longton coal mine owner, to disregard the law and fail to give the statutory fortnight's notice before imposing a hefty pay reduction of almost a shilling a day on his workers. The men went on strike, and soon surrounding colliery workers began showing support. The strike cause was championed by Chartists, who called for a general strike across the Potteries. However, by the end of July strikes were endemic across north Staffordshire and were spreading, notably in south east Lancashire.

== Events ==
As the strike spread, it gained the attention of the Chartist movement. On 13 August prominent Chartist orator Thomas Cooper arrived in Hanley and was given lodgings by coffee shop owner Jeremiah Yates. On Monday 15 August 1842, Thomas Cooper gave a speech at Crown Bank in Hanley, declaring: "that all labour cease until the People's Charter becomes the law of the land." John Ward states what happened next in his 1843 book:

On Monday the 15th, after some inflammatory sermons by Cooper (a talented Chartist orator from Leicester), on the day before at Longton and Hanley, the fraternity of Chartists and the surly advocates for a fair day's wages (which was all the Colliers in general sought for, and no more than they had a right to expect), assembled in formidable array at the Crown Bank in Hanley, where the Chartist Meetings had been usually held, proceeded thence to stop the engines at Earl Granville's works, broke open the Police Office at Hanley, also a print-works, also a principle pawnbroker's shop there, and the house of the tax collector; proceeded to Stoke, demolished the windows of that Post Office, and afterwards those of Fenton and Longton.

The rectory-house at the latter place was the especial object of their fury; it was gutted and set fire to, though the fire was extinguished before it destroyed the premises. The house of Mr Mason at Heron Cross, that of Mr Allen of Great Fenton, and that of Mr Rose, the police magistrate at Penkhull, were in like manner visited and treated by parties of marauders, who, returning to Hanley in the evening, were again lectured, and commended by Cooper for what they had done, though he reproved them for their drunkenness, as being likely to expose them to detection. Terror and consternation spread around, and many families left home for security. The scenes of the night were expected to surpass the atrocities of the day, and so they did.

Religion and justice must be exhibited as public victims on the altar of Chartist divinity. Accordingly the parsonage of the Rev. R. E. Aitkens in Hanley, and Albion House in Shelton, the residences of William Parker, Esq., one of the county magistrates, were, with all their valuable furniture, burnt and destroyed. The offices of Earl Granville in Shelton shared the same fate. The morning of the 16th discovered their smoking ruins.

— John Ward, "The Borough of Stoke-Upon-Trent, in the Commencement of the Reign of Queen Victoria".

Later on the 16th, Thomas Powys, a Burslem magistrate and deputy lord lieutenant of the county, read out the Riot Act. 4,000–5,000 protesters marched with a band from Leek to join the local people in Burslem. The marchers arrived and began to stone the dragoons. Powys then ordered troops, based at the Leopard Inn, to fire on the strikers in Burslem Square.

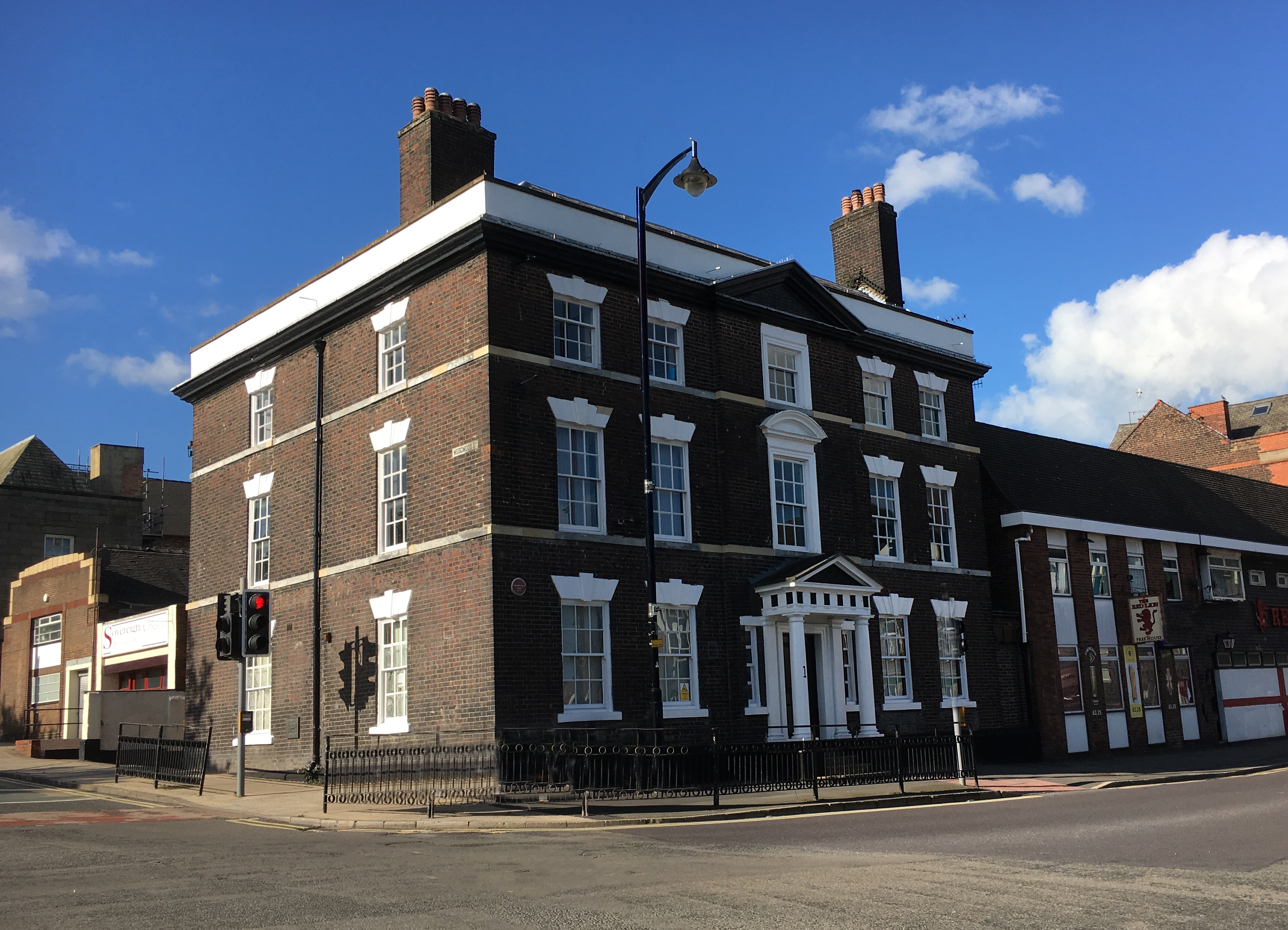
The "Big House", Burslem

Josiah Heapy was shot in the head in front of the "Big House" on Moorland Road and died instantly, and many more men and women were wounded. Heapy was 19 years old and born in Quarnford, Staffordshire. He was an orphan: his mother had died when he was 3 years old, and his father when he was 11 years old. He moved to Leek and worked as a shoemaker.

The shooting enraged the crowd and they set off to retaliate, by burning down Powys' house. The whole situation continued to deteriorate. The agent of Lord Granville's coal pits had his house ransacked and his office burnt. The Rev Aitken's manse was partly destroyed, his money stolen and his wine drunk. Many other acts of vandalism and retribution were conducted, but mine owners, clergy and magistrates were singled out for special retribution. The rioters were hounded and rounded up by the troops over the course of the day.

== Aftermath ==
Josiah Heapy's funeral was arranged at St. Edward's, Leek on 18 August and apparently led to no disorder. Although there has been local speculation, the location of his grave has not been found. A verdict of justifiable homicide was given.

The late Riots in the Potteries

"The arrest of Chartist agitators in connexion with these outrages has caused no little dismay among their adherents ... Yates, the coffee-shopkeeper at Hanley, whose house had been a place of rendezvous for violent Chartists, and who had himself been one of the most active in turning out the people at the manufactory ... was apprehended on Saturday 20th while at work"

— North Staffordshire Mercury 27 August 1842

A total of 274 people were brought to trial in the special assizes that followed, of whom 146 were sent to prison and 54 were transported (to Australia). John Ward names those deported. By the end of 1842 the county police force had been established and the first chief constable appointed.

This did not dent the popularity of trade unionism though. The Miners' Association of Great Britain and Ireland was formally established on 7 November 1842. The United Branches of Operative Potters (UBOP) was born on 6 September 1843.

On 28 April 2018 a plaque was unveiled in Swan Square, Burslem in honour of Josiah Heapy.

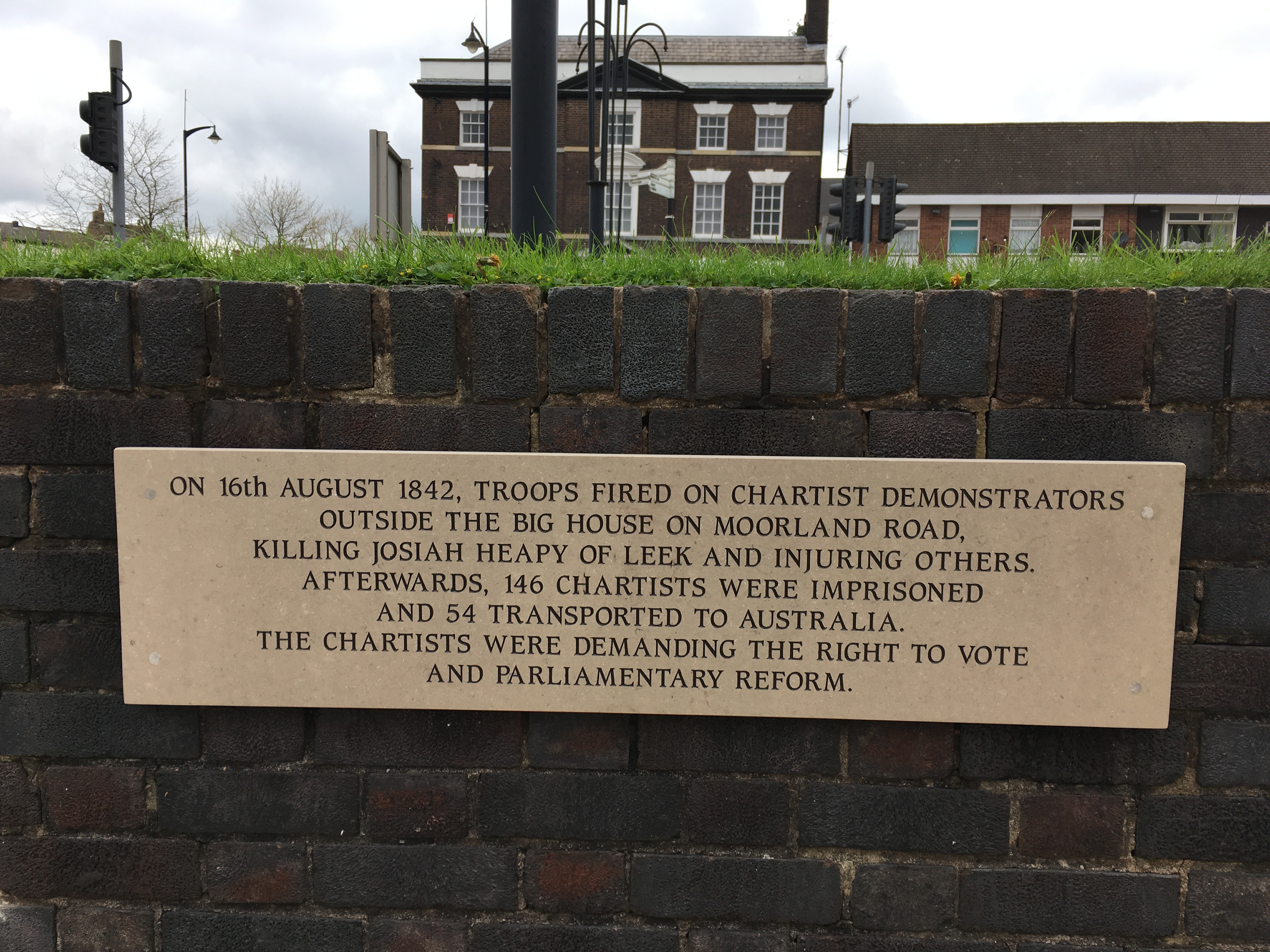
Josiah Heapy plaque

== See also ==
- History of Hanley
- 1842 General Strike
- Chartism
- The Potteries
