= Corn Exchange, Preston =

Commercial building in Preston, Lancashire, England

Corn Exchange
- Public Hall
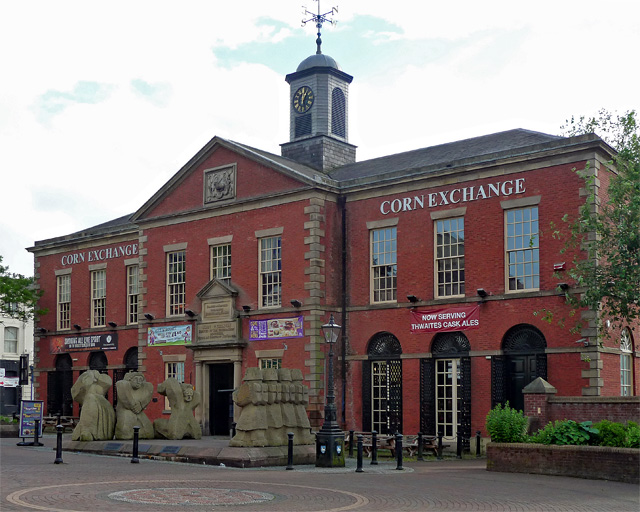
- Corn Exchange, Preston

- Shown in Preston city centre Shown in Lancashire
- 53.7593°N 2.7035°W
- Location: Lune Street, Preston

History
- Built: 1824

Site notes
- Architect: William Corey
- Architectural style: Georgian style

Listed Building – Grade II
- Official name: The Former Public Hall
- Designated: 21 March 1973
- Reference no.: 1292350

The Corn Exchange is a former commercial building in Preston, Lancashire, England, which was commissioned as a corn exchange and later used for 90 years as an assembly room and auditorium known as the Public Hall. Much of the structure was demolished in the late 1980s, but the main entrance building survives as a public house, and is a Grade II listed building.

== History ==
The building was commissioned by the mayor, Nicholas Grimshaw, on behalf of Preston Corporation as a corn exchange for the town in 1822. It was designed by William Corey in the Georgian style, built in red brick with stone dressings at a cost of £11,000, and was completed in 1824. It was located adjacent to the terminus of the Lancaster Canal which was used to transport grains bought and sold at the exchange.

The design involved a symmetrical main frontage of nine bays facing onto Lune Street. The central section of three bays, which was slightly projected forward, featured a doorway flanked by a pair of Tuscan order columns supporting an entablature. Above the doorway there was a stone plaque commemorating of commissioning of the building. The bays in the outer sections contained round headed openings which were protected by cast iron screens made by Rothwell, Hick and Rothwell. The other two bays on the ground floor in the central section and all the windows on the first floor were fenestrated by sash windows. At roof level, there was a cornice and a central pediment, with a plaque carved with the borough coat of arms in the tympanum. There was also a central cupola with louvres, a front-facing clock and a weather vane. Internally, the building was laid out as a series of rooms round an open courtyard.

On 13 August 1842, a group of cotton workers demonstrated against the poor conditions in the town's mills during the Preston Strike of 1842. The then mayor, Samuel Horrocks, read the Riot Act and a detachment from the 72nd Regiment, Duke of Albany's Own Highlanders corralled the demonstrators in front of the Corn Exchange. Strikers threw stones at the soldiers and at the police. In response, shots were fired and four of the demonstrators were killed and three others were injured.

The courtyard was covered over with a glass roof to a design by Philip Park in 1853. The use of the building as a corn exchange declined significantly in the wake of the Great Depression of British Agriculture in the late 19th century. In this context, the then mayor, Edmund Birley, arranged for the building to be converted into a public hall capable of accommodating 3,300 people, to a design by Benjamin Sykes, in 1882. An additional plaque was fixed above the doorway to commemorate the change of use. The Public Hall became a popular concert venue in the 1960s. The rock band, The Beatles, performed there in October 1962 and, again, in September 1963, as did the rock band, Led Zeppelin, in November 1971, and the singer-songwriter, David Bowie, in June 1972.

The Public Hall closed in March 1973, replaced by a new Guild Hall on a different site. The local council intended to demolish it to make way for a proposed extension of the Ringway town centre bypass, whose construction a few years earlier had resulted in the creation of a gyratory system around the hall. However, demolition was blocked when listed building status was granted on 21 March 1973, and it was not until 1986 that consent was granted for most of the original structure behind the façade to be demolished. A commemorative sculpture designed by Gordon Young, which was intended to depict the four cotton workers being shot, was unveiled in front of the building, on the 150th anniversary of the riot, in August 1992. The structure behind the facade was rebuilt and then re-opened as a public house in 1993. Since then, it has traded variously as "The Corn Exchange", "The Flax and Firkin", "The Assembly" and "1842".

== See also ==
- Corn exchanges in England
- Listed buildings in Preston, Lancashire
