= Fenton, Staffordshire =

One of the Six Towns of Stoke-on-Trent, in Staffordshire, England

Coordinates: 52.9977°N 2.1578°W

Fenton: The Forgotten Town
- Federated Town and District
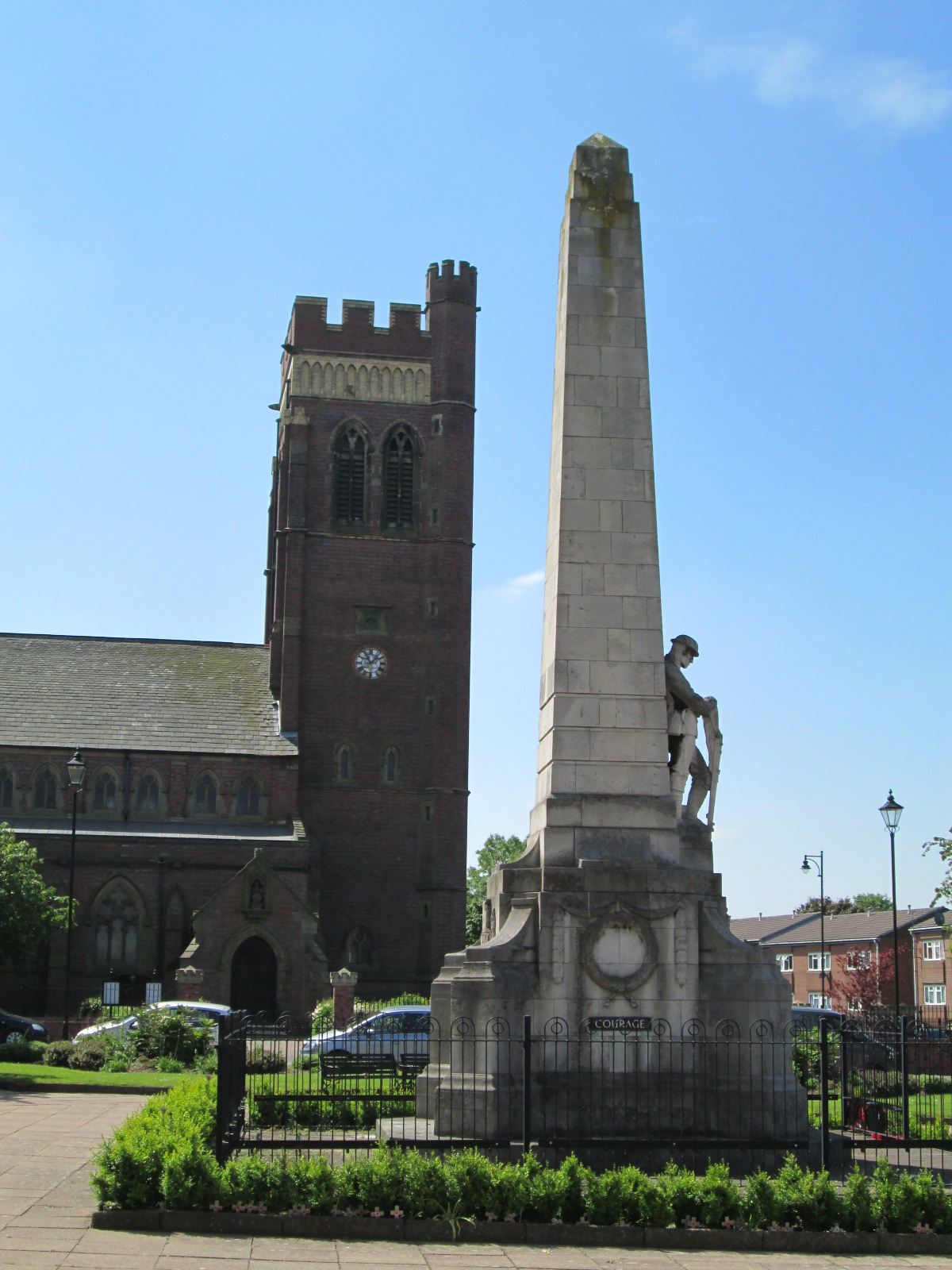
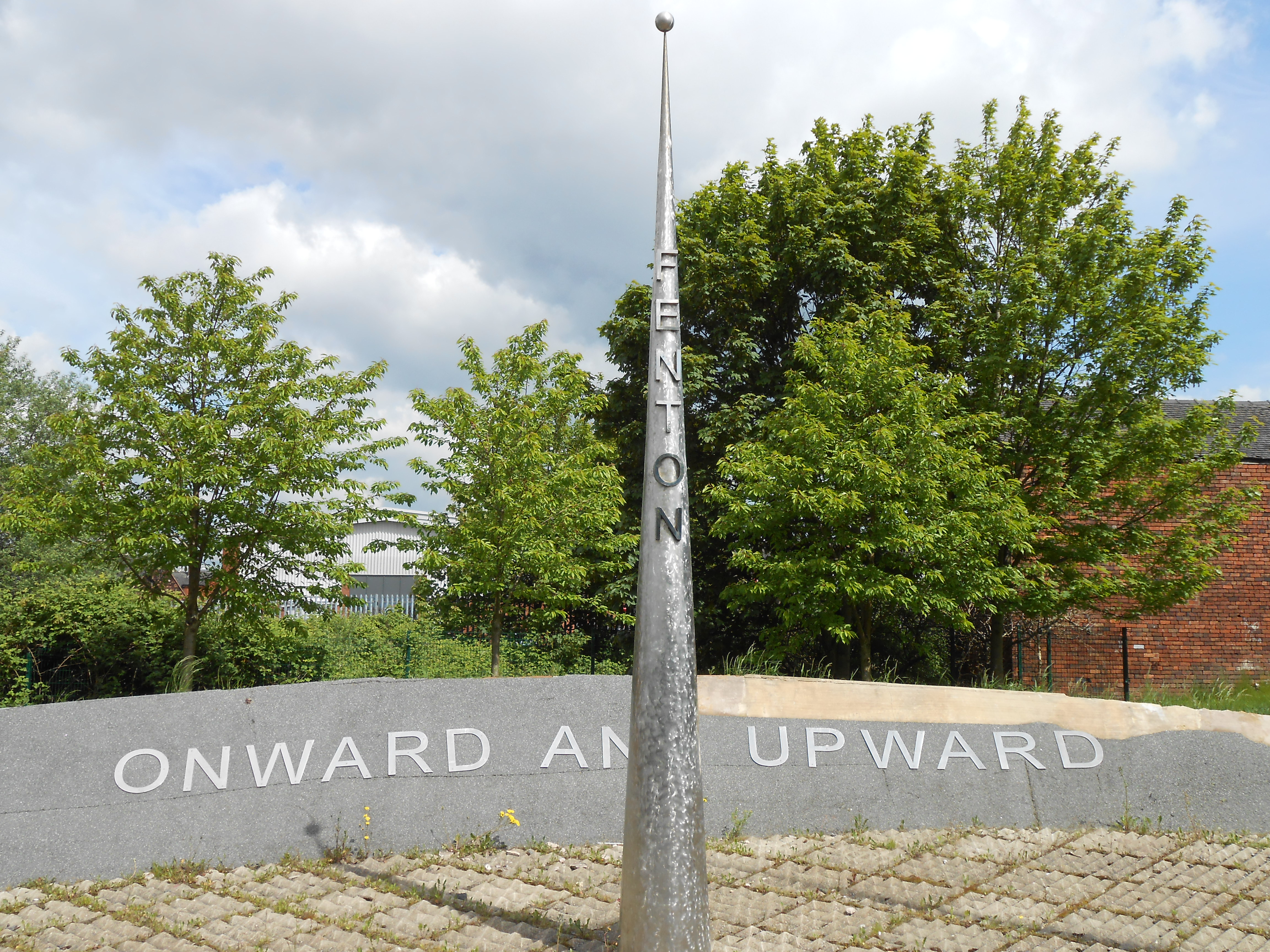
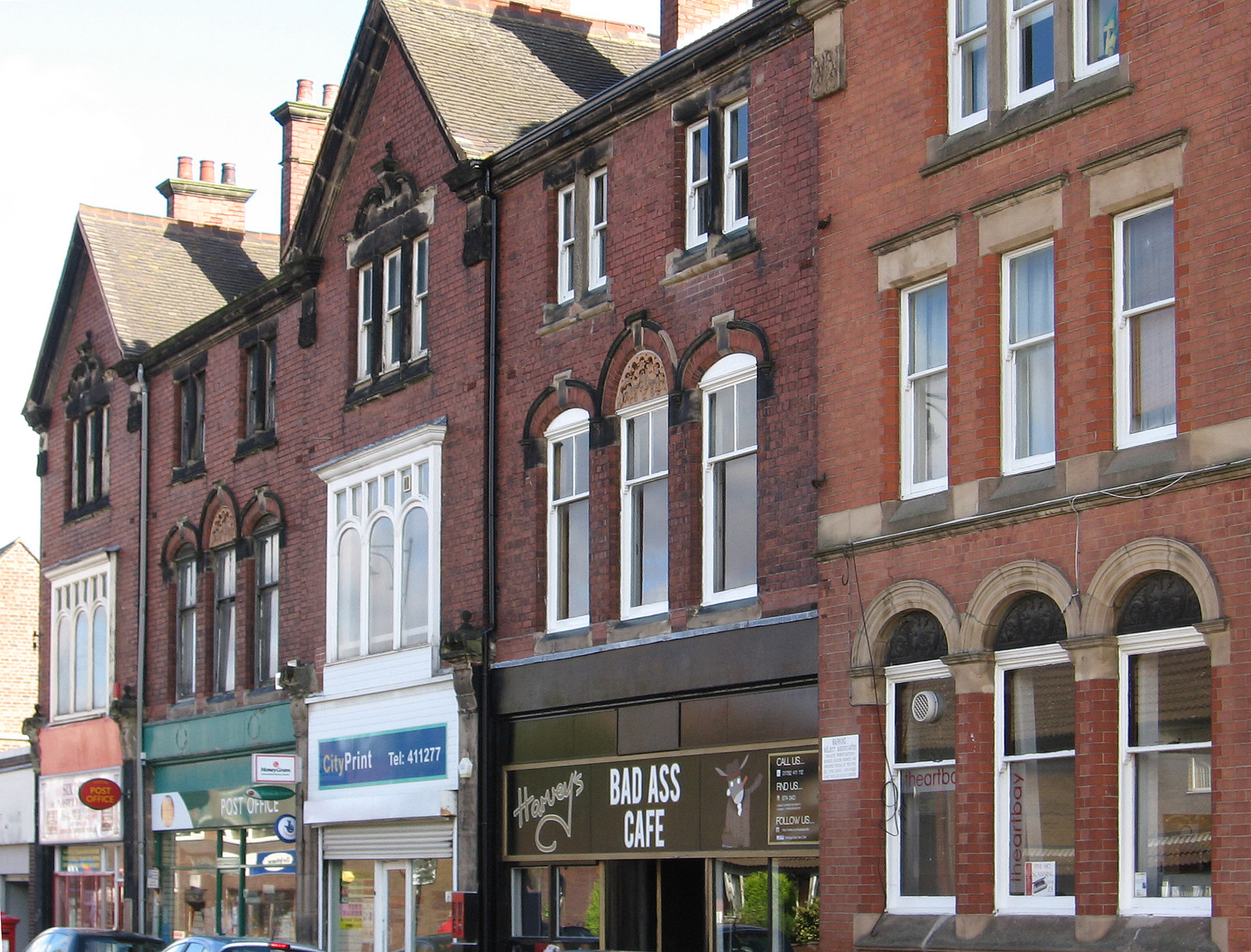
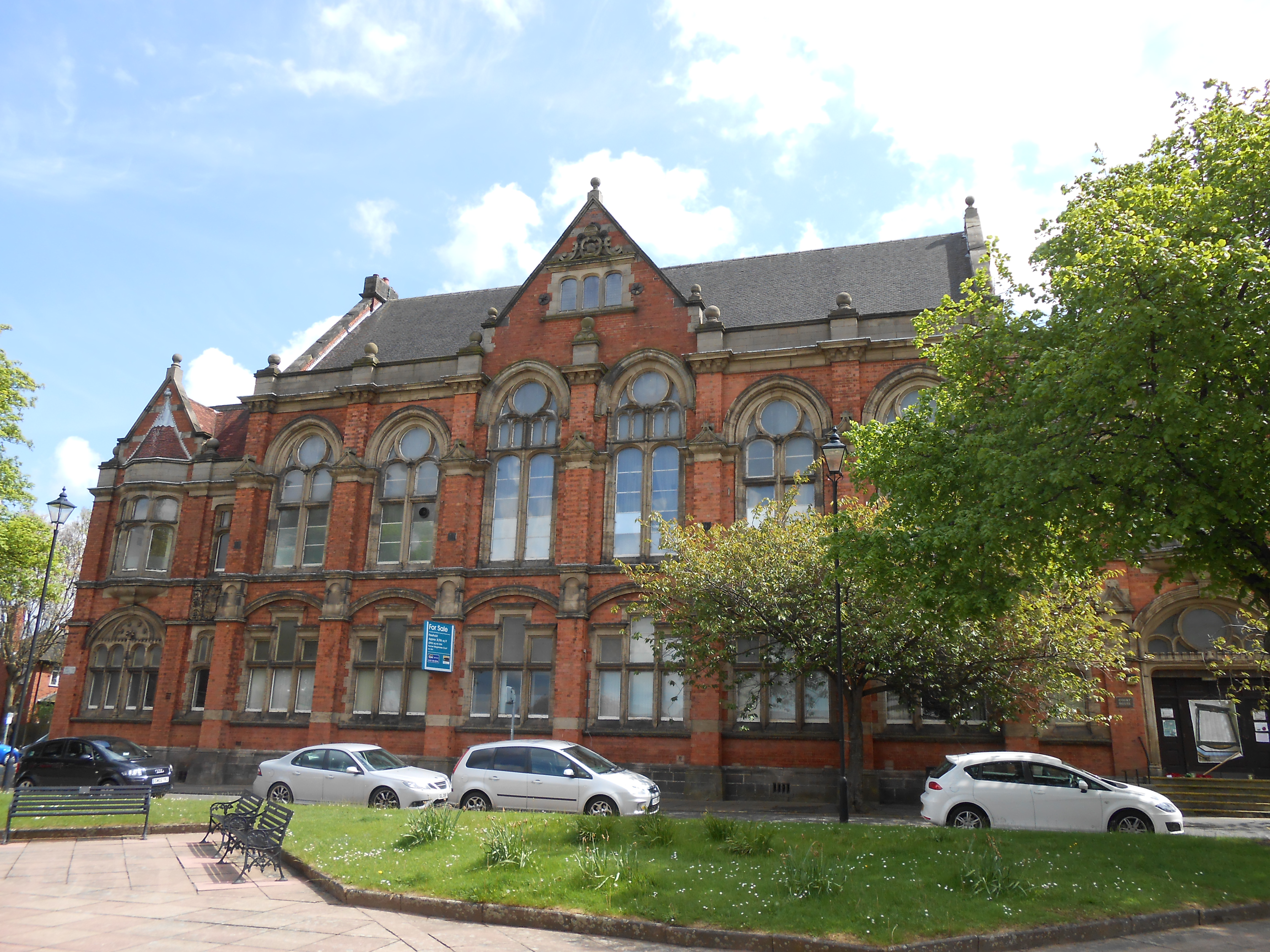
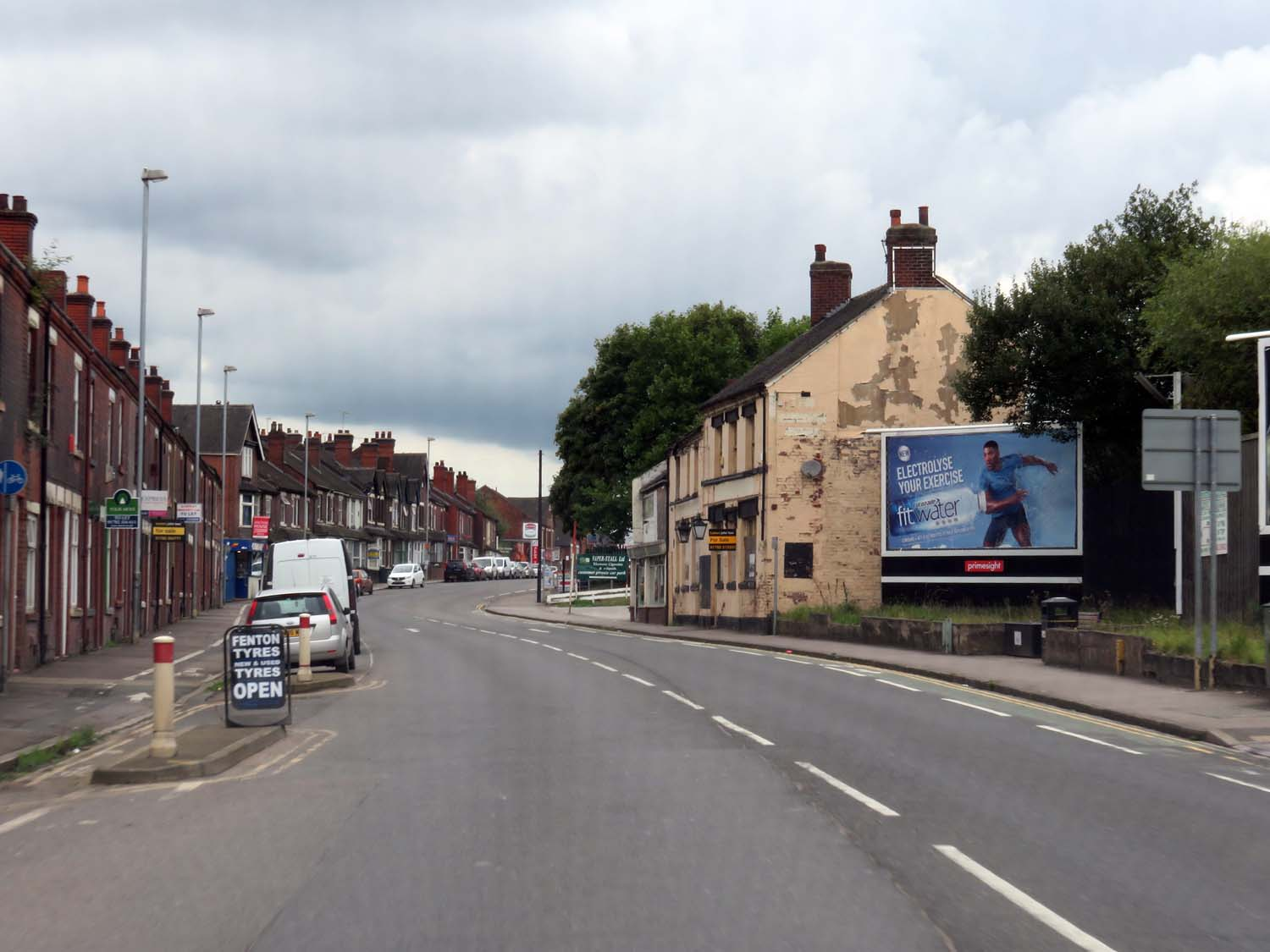
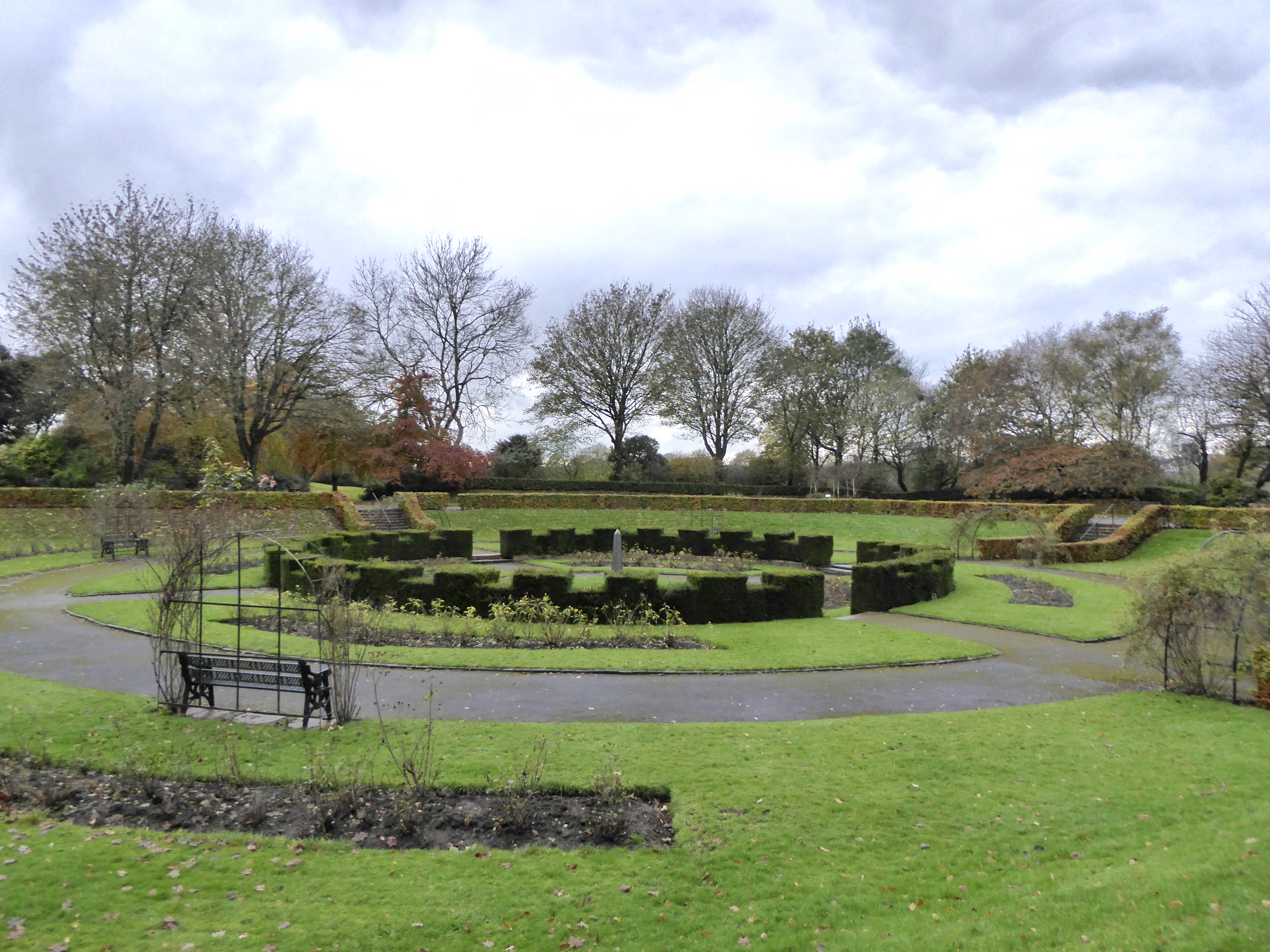
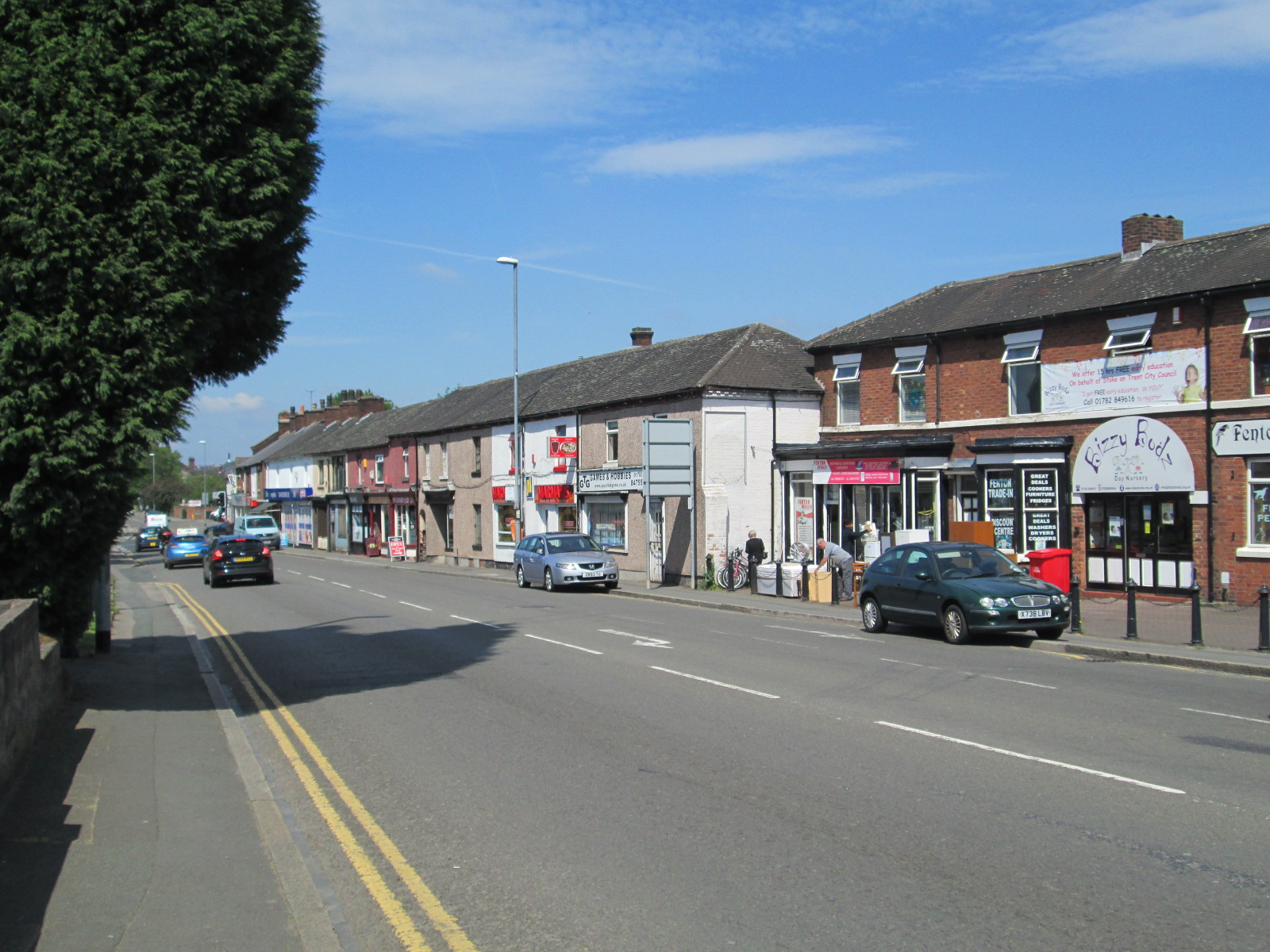
- Top:Fenton Albert Square War Memorial and Christ Church; Upper: Upwards and Onwards Monument and Christchurch Street; Lower: Old Town Hall and King Street; Bottom: Formal Gardens and City Road

- Location within Staffordshire
- OS grid reference: SJ897446
- Unitary authority: Stoke-on-Trent
- Ceremonial county: Staffordshire
- Region: West Midlands
- Country: England
- Sovereign state: United Kingdom
- Districts of the town: List: Blurton (Part); Heron Cross; Shelton (Part)
- Post town: STOKE-ON-TRENT
- Postcode district: ST4
- Dialling code: 01782
- Police: Staffordshire
- Fire: Staffordshire
- Ambulance: West Midlands
- UK Parliament: Stoke-on-Trent South

Fenton is a town in Stoke-on-Trent, in the ceremonial county of Staffordshire, England. It is one of the six towns that amalgamated with Hanley, Tunstall, Burslem, Longton and Stoke-upon-Trent to form the county borough of Stoke-on-Trent in 1910, later raised to city status in 1925. Fenton is often referred to as "the Forgotten Town", because it was omitted by local author, Arnold Bennett, from many of his works based in the area, including one of his most famous novels, Anna of the Five Towns.

== History ==
=== Etymology ===
The name Fenton derives from the Old English fenntūn meaning 'settlement by a fen'.

=== Administration ===
Fenton started to become populated as a group of farms and private small-holdings were built there, alongside a lane running from the southern reaches of Hanley (by 1933 this lane was very busy and given the title of the A50).

Around the 1750s, the land was commonly known as Fenton Vivian, after Vivian of Standon and his heirs, its lords in the thirteenth century. By the 1850s, the area around Duke Street and China Street had become populated during the rapid development of the Potteries.

Potters settled in Fenton in large houses alongside their potbanks. Such houses include Great Fenton Hall, Fenton House (home of the Baker family), Heron Cottage and Grove House.

Fenton was historically a chapelry in the ancient parish of Stoke-upon-Trent, on 31 December 1894 Fenton became a civil parish.

The two principal districts, Fenton Vivian and Fenton Culvert – each with their scattered communities, were brought together to make an urban district with its own board of guardians in 1894.

On 1 April 1910, the town was federated into the county borough of Stoke-on-Trent. On 1 April 1922 the parish was abolished and merged with Stoke on Trent. At the 1921 census (the last before the abolition of the parish), Fenton had a population of 26,714. By 1925, Stoke-on-Trent was granted city status.

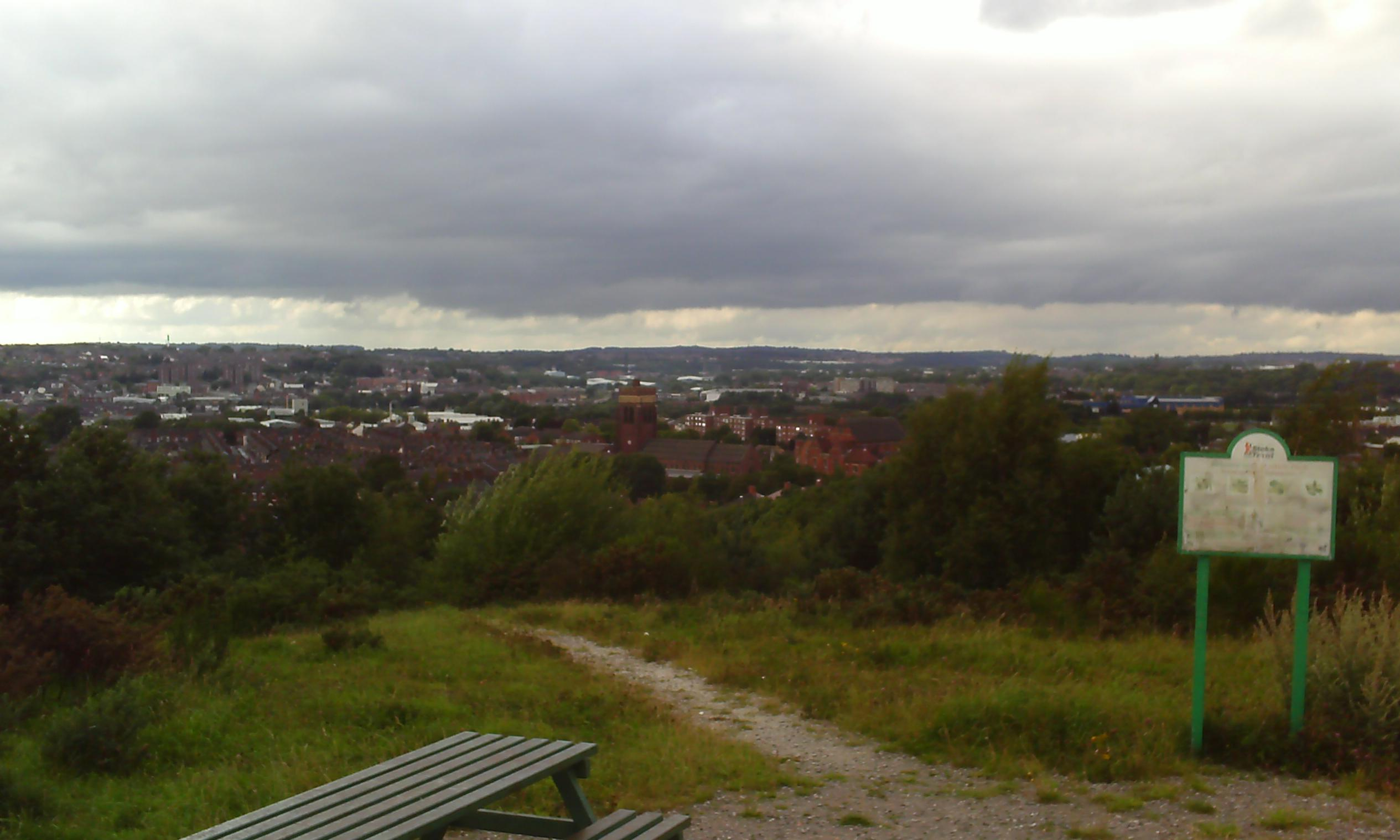
The Fenton skyline, mostly a residential area, with a prominent church (Christ Church) being a notable feature. As taken on a cloudy day in August, 2010, atop Glebedale Park Hill. This latter was immortalized in music in 2010, in a work for full symphony orchestra, written by local violinist, pianist, and composer, Vic Carnall, and entitled, "Glebedale Park Hill", which, with an orchestra of 100 players, received its première performance at The Victoria Hall, Hanley, Stoke-on-Trent, on 6 November 2010, as part of the centenary celebrations of Stoke-on-Trent's Federation in 1910.

=== Industry ===
Fenton has been the home to a number of potteries such as Coalport and Baker & Co, and its architectural heritage includes listed bottle ovens.

=== First World War ===
During the First World War Fenton was bombed by Zeppelin 'L 21'.

== Geography ==
It is within easy reach of the A500, A34 and the A50, a short distance away from Longton, Hanley, Newcastle, and Stoke.

=== Suburbs ===
Although Fenton has large industrial plants, particularly from the pottery trade, it has always been considered more of a residential area.

Fenton includes Heron Cross, Mount Pleasant, Saxonfields, Pool Dole, Lane Delph and Fenpark.

== Places of interest ==
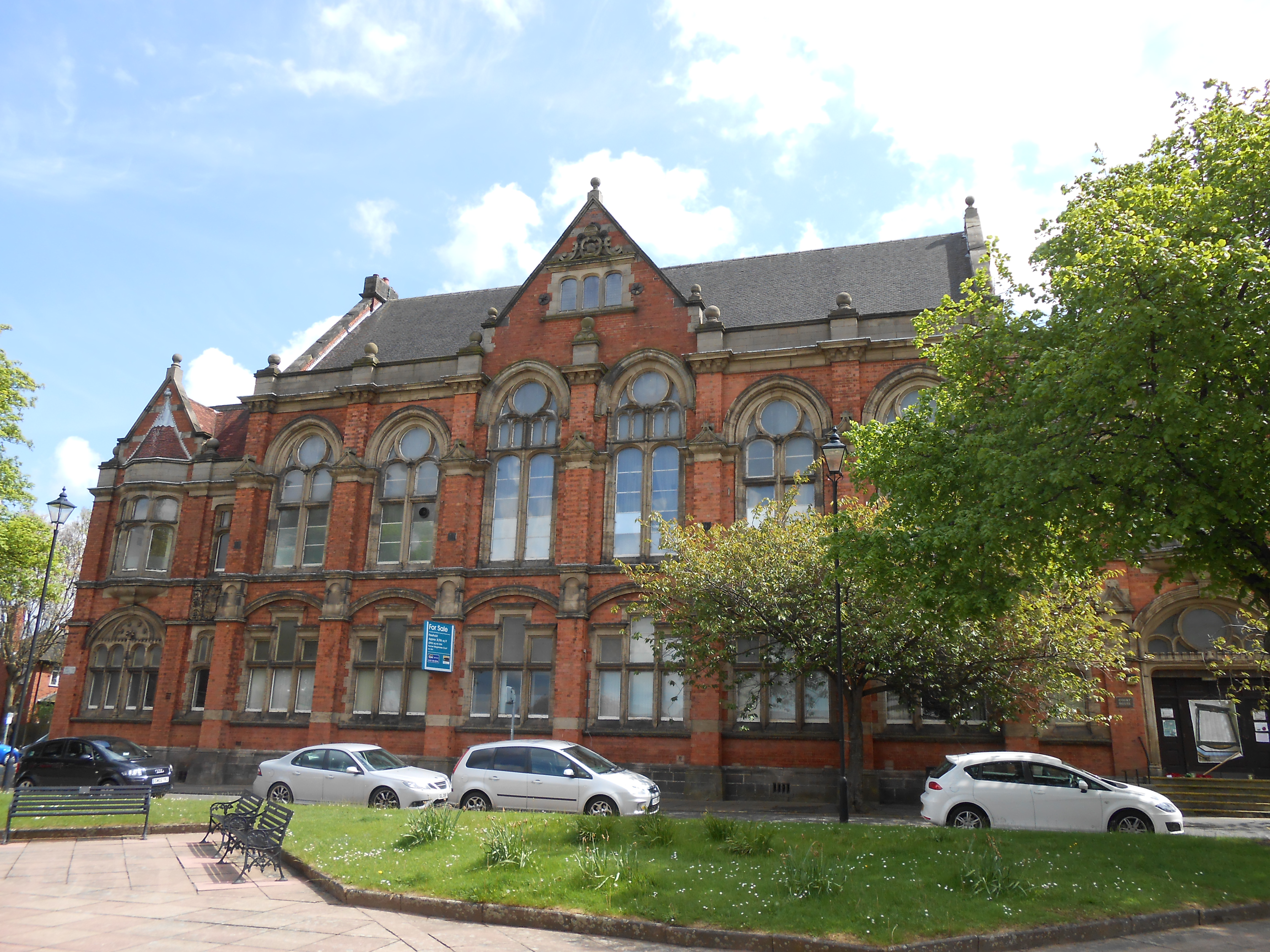
Fenton Town Hall

Fenton Town Hall, which latterly served as the local magistrates' court, was commissioned by local pottery owner, William Meath Baker, at his own expense, to a design by Robert Scrivener and completed in 1888.

William Meath Baker was a very good friend of the great English composer, Sir Edward Elgar, who included him in his world-famous Enigma Variations (Variation IV).

Fenton Manor has a swimming pool, gym, and fitness centre, plus a 1,300-seater arena. Fenton Park has football pitches, pavilions, and a playground.

== Economy ==
Fenton differs from the other Potteries towns in that it does not have a town centre. Instead, amenities and shops are spread over a sizeable area.

Fenton is home to the northern headquarters of Lister Windows, one of the UK’s leading manufacturers of uPVC and Aluminium windows and doors.

== Notable people ==
- Richard Bolton (1570?–1648) English lawyer, an important figure in the politics of Ireland
- Sir Edward Bolton (1592–1659) English judge who served as Solicitor General for Ireland
- Jeremiah Yates (1810–1852) active Chartist, imprisoned for one year for bringing workers out on strike during the 1842 Pottery Riots
- James Wright (1819–1887) a notable New Zealand potter, born in Fenton
- Mortimer Brown (1874–1966) English sculptor, his early work was based on religious and classical themes.
- David Gordon Hines (1915–2000) chartered accountant and colonial administrator, developed farming co-operatives in Tanganyika
- Ken Leese (born 1928) member of the Queensland Legislative Assembly
- Frank Bough (1933–2020) English television presenter
- Michael Bettaney (1950–2018) MI5 officer, convicted of passing sensitive documents to the Soviet Embassy in London
- Paul Bown (born 1957) English TV actor

=== Sport ===
- Len Birks (1896–1975) footballer, over 250 club caps, including 101 for Port Vale F.C.
- Billy Briscoe (1896–1994) footballer, 473 club caps, including over 300 for Port Vale F.C.
- Jack Griffiths (1909–1975) footballer, 194 club caps for Wolves, Bolton Wanderers F.C. and Manchester United F.C.
- Ronnie Allen (1929–2001) footballer, 638 club caps, mainly for Port Vale F.C. and WBA
- Stan Steele (1937–2005) former footballer, scored 97 goals in 370 league and cup games for Port Vale F.C.
- Catherine Swinnerton (born 1958) former racing cyclist, competed at the 1984 Summer Olympics in Los Angeles.
- Ryan Shotton (born 1988) footballer, over 200 club caps, plays for Birmingham City F.C.
- John Harvey (born 1884) Champion cyclist

In the April 1880–81 Staffordshire Cup, Aston Villa beat Fenton on the road to final.

== In popular culture ==
In the Jorge Luis Borges short story The Garden of Forking Paths, Dr. Yu Tsun goes to a suburb of Fenton to meet Stephen Albert.
