= Pottery =

Craft of making objects from clay

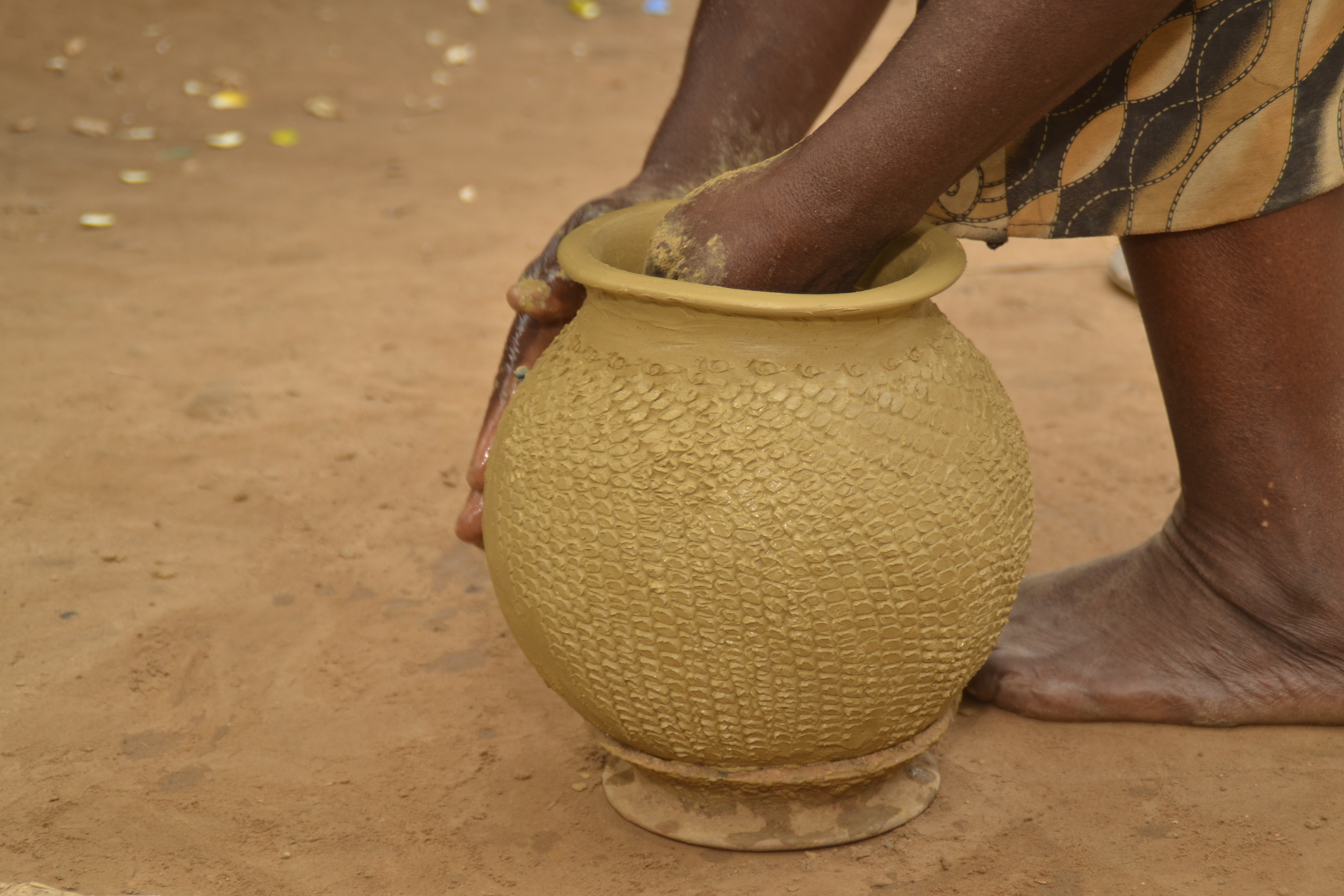
Hand building a jar

Pottery is the process and the products of forming vessels and other objects with clay and other raw materials, which are fired at high temperatures to give them a hard and durable form. The place where a potter makes such wares is also called a pottery (plural potteries). The definition of pottery, used by the ASTM International, is "all fired ceramic wares that contain clay when formed, except technical, structural, and refractory products". End applications include tableware, decorative ware, sanitary ware, and in technology and industry such as electrical insulators and laboratory ware. In art history and archaeology, especially of ancient and prehistoric periods, pottery often means only vessels, and sculpted figurines of the same material are called terracottas.

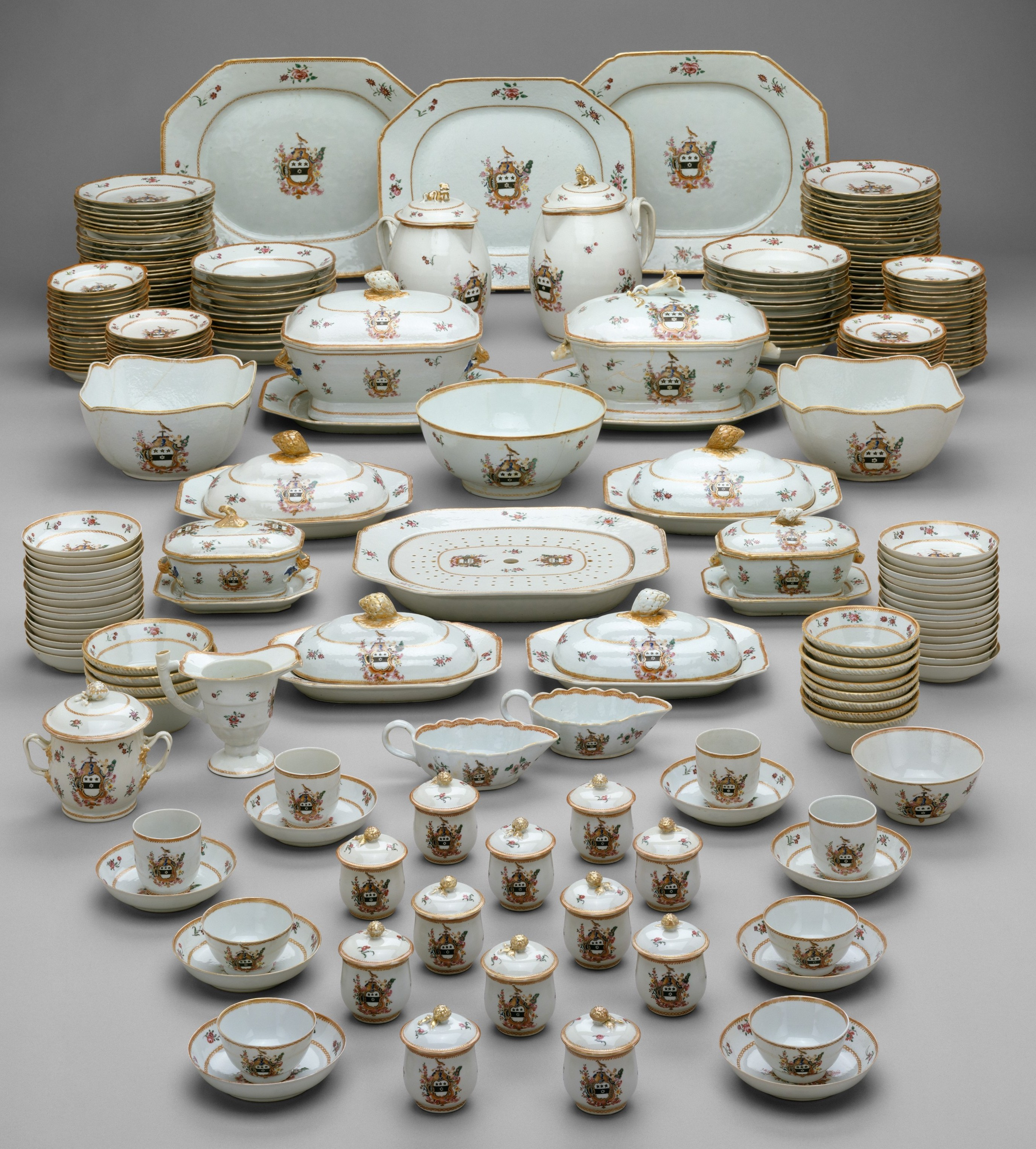
An 18th-century Chinese export porcelain service, for the America market

Pottery is one of the oldest human inventions, originating before the Neolithic period, with ceramic objects such as the Gravettian culture Venus of Dolní Věstonice figurine discovered in the Czech Republic dating back to 29,000–25,000 BC. However, the earliest known pottery vessels were discovered in Jiangxi, China, which date back to 18,000 BC. Other early Neolithic and pre-Neolithic pottery artifacts have been found, in Jōmon Japan (10,500 BC), the Russian Far East (14,000 BC), Sub-Saharan Africa (9,400 BC), South America (9,000s–7,000s BC), and the Middle East (7,000s–6,000s BC).

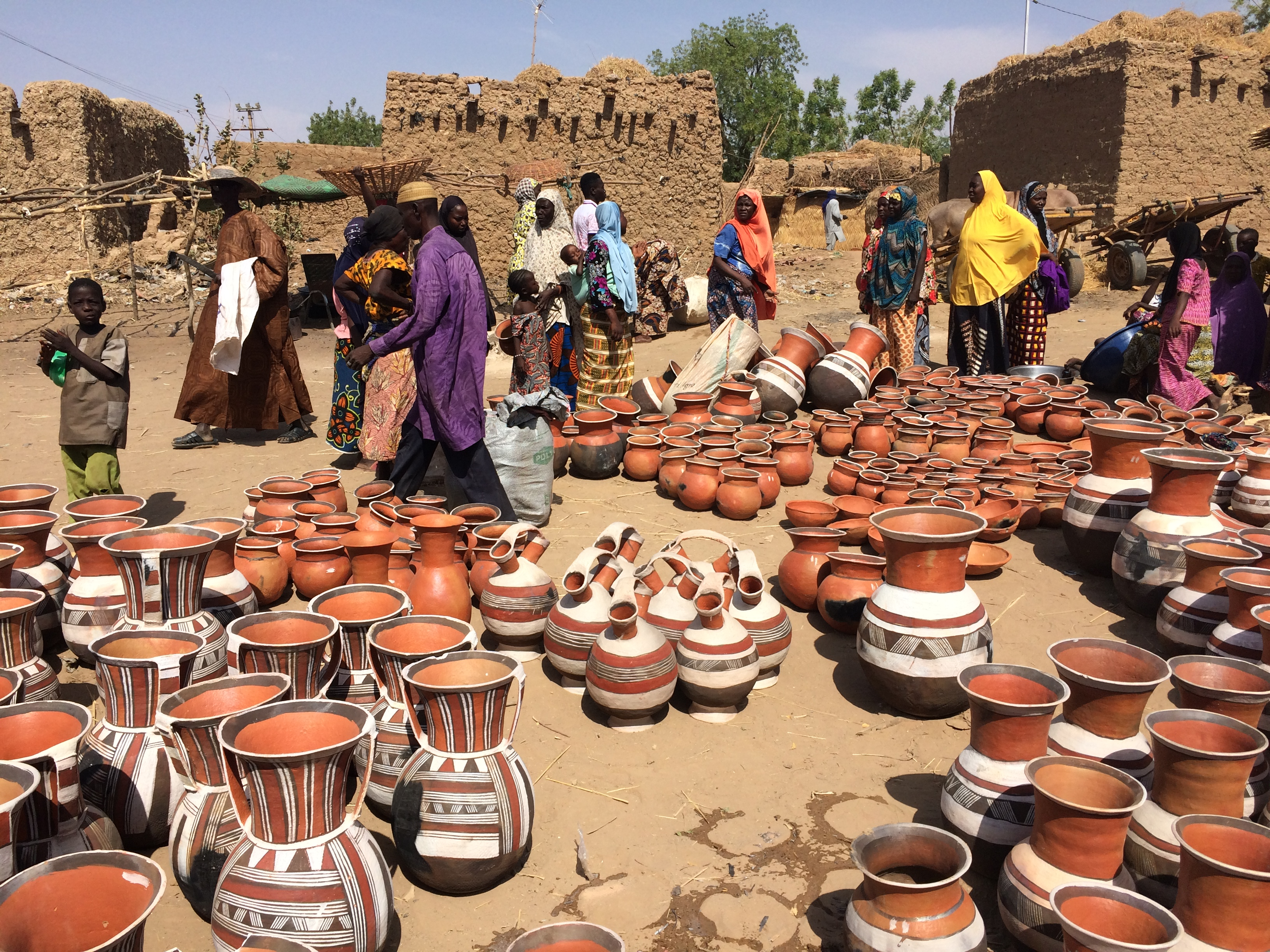
The pottery market in Boubon, Niger

Pottery is made by forming a clay body into objects of a desired shape and heating them to high temperatures (600–1,400 °C) in a bonfire, pit, or kiln, which induces reactions that lead to permanent changes, including increasing the strength and rigidity of the object. Much pottery is purely utilitarian, but some can also be regarded as ceramic art. An article can be decorated before or after firing.

Pottery is traditionally divided into three types: earthenware, stoneware, and porcelain. All three may be glazed and unglazed. Various techniques may also decorate all. In many examples, the group a piece belongs to is immediately apparent, but this is not always the case; for example, fritware uses little or no clay, so it falls outside these groups. Historic pottery of all these types is often grouped as either "fine" wares, relatively expensive and well-made, and following the aesthetic taste of the culture concerned, or "coarse", "popular", "folk" or "village" wares, mostly undecorated, and often less well-made.

Ceramic vessels have been used for cooking since antiquity due to their excellent thermal retention and even heat distribution. Porous earthenware, like the tagine, absorbs and releases moisture as steam to tenderise ingredients while preserving flavours. Vitrified stoneware provides a dense, non-reactive surface that resists acidic interaction, ensuring taste purity. Structural integrity under thermal stress is managed by formulating the clay body to lower thermal expansion. This prevents cracking from temperature gradients between heat sources and ambient air. Modern ceramic cookware often employs specialised glazes to resist thermal shock and scratching, providing a durable, hygienic interface for ovens and hobs.

A person who makes the pottery is called a potter.

== Main types ==
=== Earthenware ===
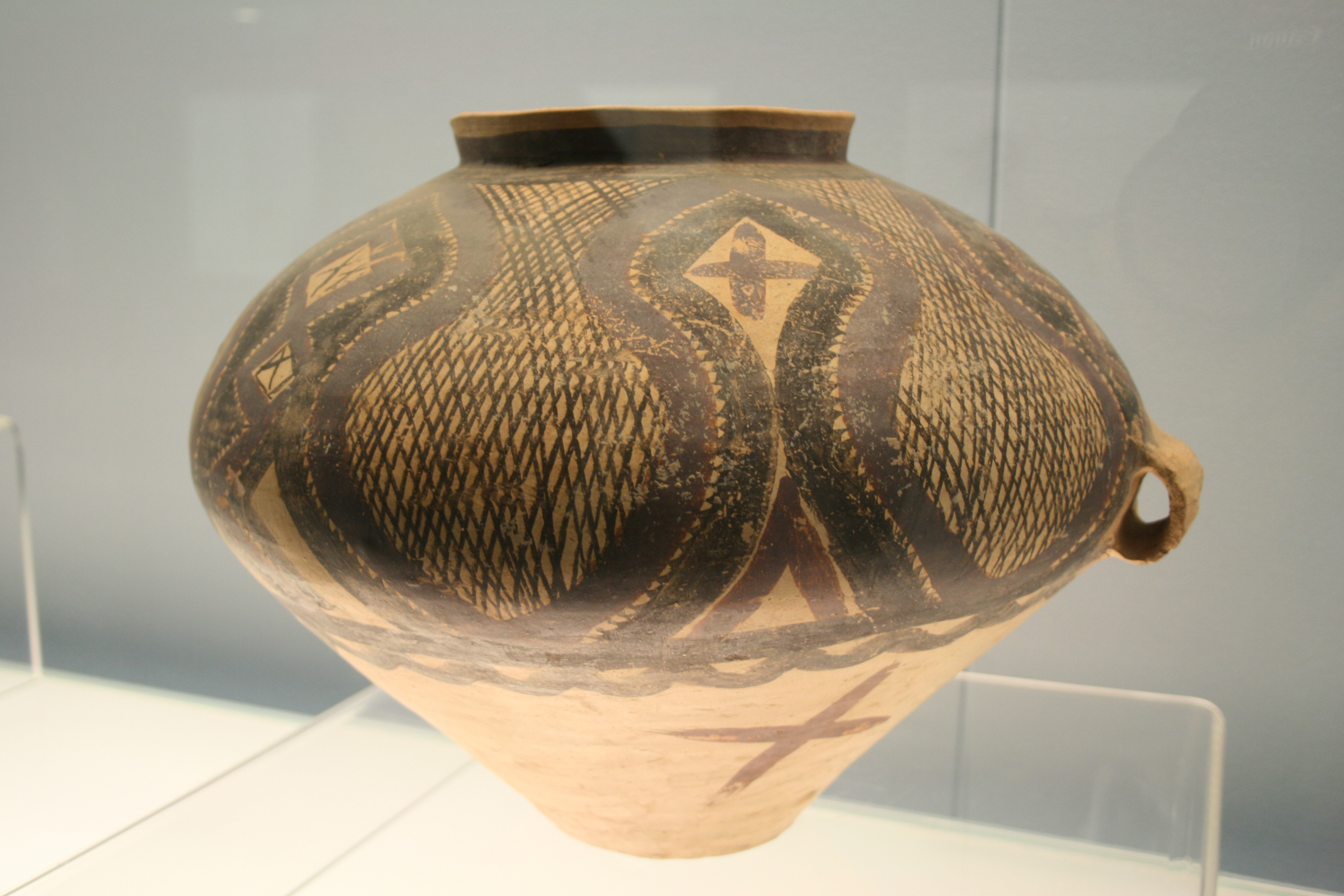
Earthenware jar from the Neolithic Majiayao culture China, 3300 to 2000 BCE

The earliest forms of pottery were made from clays that were fired at low temperatures, initially in pit-fires or in open bonfires. They were hand-formed and undecorated. Earthenware can be fired as low as 600 °C (1,112 °F), and is normally fired below 1,200 °C (2,190 °F).

Because unglazed earthenware is porous, it has limited utility for storing liquids or as tableware. However, earthenware has had a continuous history from the Neolithic period to today. It can be made from a wide variety of clays, some of which fire to a buff, brown, or black colour, with iron in the constituent minerals resulting in a reddish-brown. Reddish coloured varieties are called terracotta, especially when unglazed or used for sculpture. The development of ceramic glaze made impermeable pottery possible, improving the popularity and practicality of pottery vessels. Decoration has evolved.

=== Stoneware ===
15th-century Japanese stoneware storage jar, with partial ash glaze

Stoneware is pottery that has been fired in a kiln at a relatively high temperature, from about 1,100 °C (2,010 °F) to 1,200 °C (2,190 °F), and is stronger and non-porous to liquids. The Chinese, who developed stoneware very early on, classify this together with porcelain as high-fired wares. In contrast, stoneware could only be produced in Europe from the late Middle Ages, as European kilns were less efficient, and the right type of clay was less common. It remained a speciality of Germany until the Renaissance.

Stoneware is tough and practical, and much of it has always been utilitarian, for the kitchen or storage rather than the table. But "fine" stoneware has been important in China, Japan, and the West, and continues to be made. Many utilitarian types have also come to be appreciated as art.

=== Porcelain ===
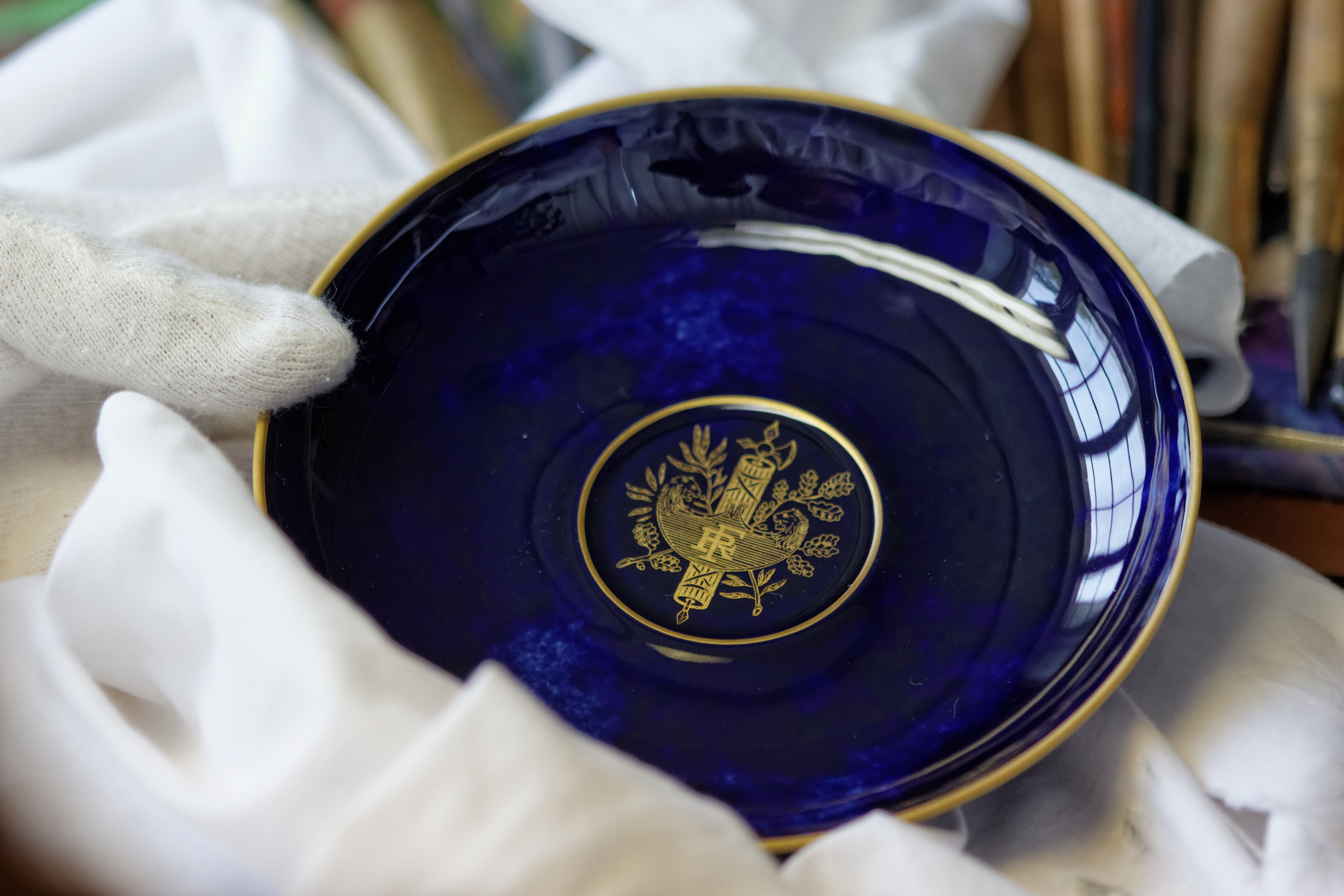
Contemporary porcelain plate by Sèvres

Porcelain is made by heating materials, generally including kaolin, in a kiln to temperatures between 1,200 and 1,400 °C (2,200 and 2,600 °F). This is higher than that used for the other types, and achieving these temperatures was a long struggle, as was determining which materials were needed. The toughness, strength, and translucence of porcelain, relative to other types of pottery, arise mainly from vitrification and the formation of the mineral mullite within the body at these high temperatures.

Although porcelain was first made in China, the Chinese traditionally do not recognise it as a distinct category, grouping it with stoneware as "high-fired" ware, opposed to "low-fired" earthenware. This confuses the issue of when it was first made. A degree of translucency and whiteness was achieved by the Tang dynasty (AD 618–906), and considerable quantities were being exported. The modern level of whiteness was not reached until much later, in the 14th century. Porcelain was also made in Korea and in Japan from the end of the 16th century, after suitable kaolin was located in those countries. It was not made effectively outside East Asia until the 18th century.

== Archaeology ==
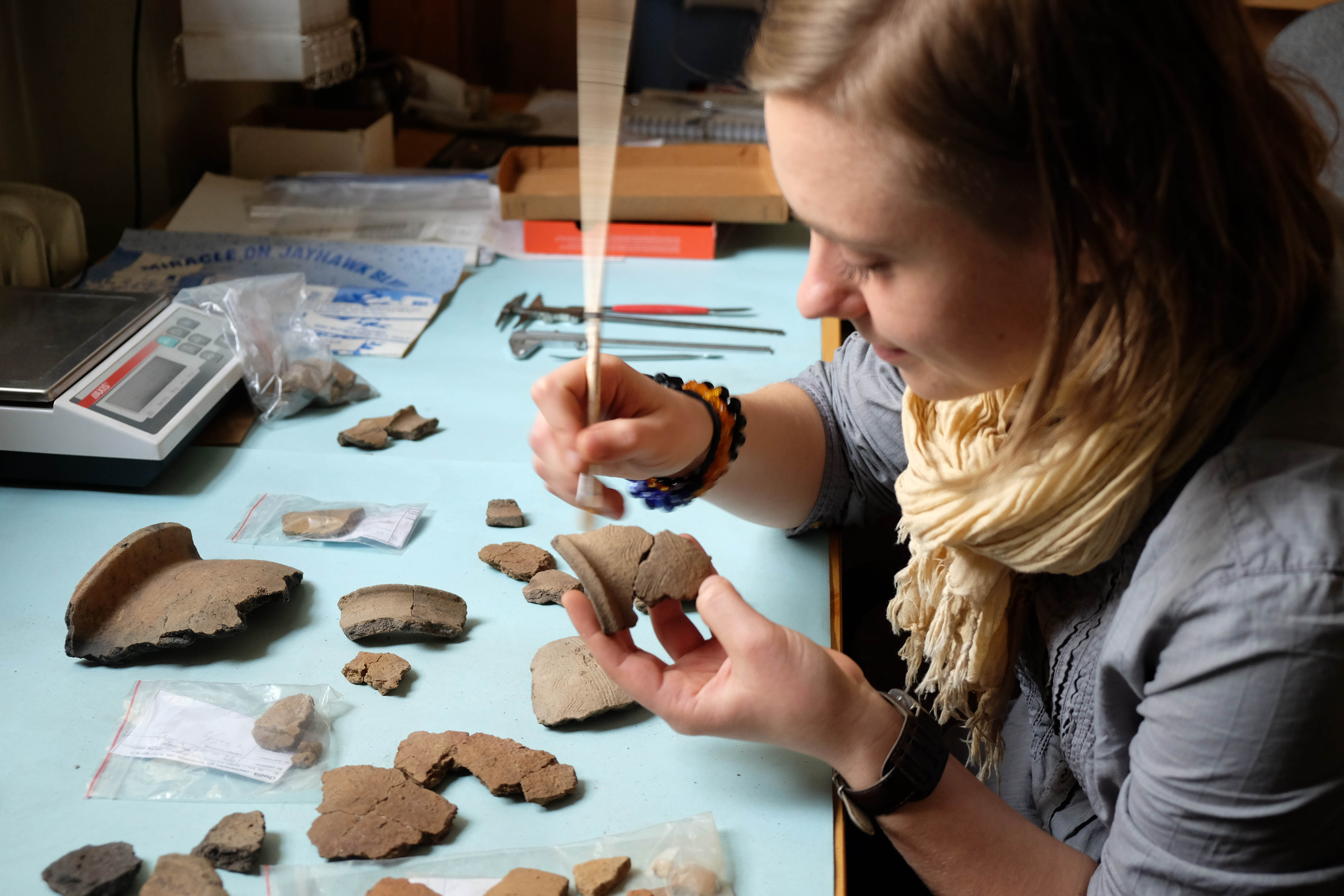
Archaeologist cleaning an early mediaeval pottery sherd from Chodlik, Poland.

The study of pottery can help provide insight into past cultures. Fabric analysis (see section below), used to analyse the fabric of pottery, is an important part of archaeology for understanding the archaeological culture of the excavated site by studying the fabric of artifacts, such as their usage, source material composition, decorative pattern, color of patterns, etc. This helps to understand characteristics, sophistication, habits, technology, tools, trade, etc., of the people who made and used the pottery. Carbon dating reveals the age. Sites with similar pottery characteristics share the same culture; those with distinct cultural characteristics but some overlap indicate cultural exchange, such as trade, living in the vicinity, or continuity of habitation. Examples are black and red ware, redware, Sothi-Siswal culture and Painted Grey Ware culture. The six fabrics of Kalibangan are a good example of how fabric analysis can identify a differentiated culture that was previously thought to be typical of Indus Valley civilisation (IVC) culture.

Due to its inherent durability, pottery serves as a primary source of archaeological data, often surviving as diagnostic fragments long after artifacts made of organic materials have decayed. When synthesised with broader archaeological evidence, the analysis of ceramic assemblages is instrumental in constructing theories regarding a society's socioeconomic organisation, economic prosperity, and cultural evolution. Furthermore, ceramic studies allow for significant inferences concerning a culture's daily life, religious practices, and social hierarchies. The decorative and functional choices reflected in pottery can also reveal a society's complex attitudes toward neighbouring groups, its internal worldview, and its conceptualisation of the universe.

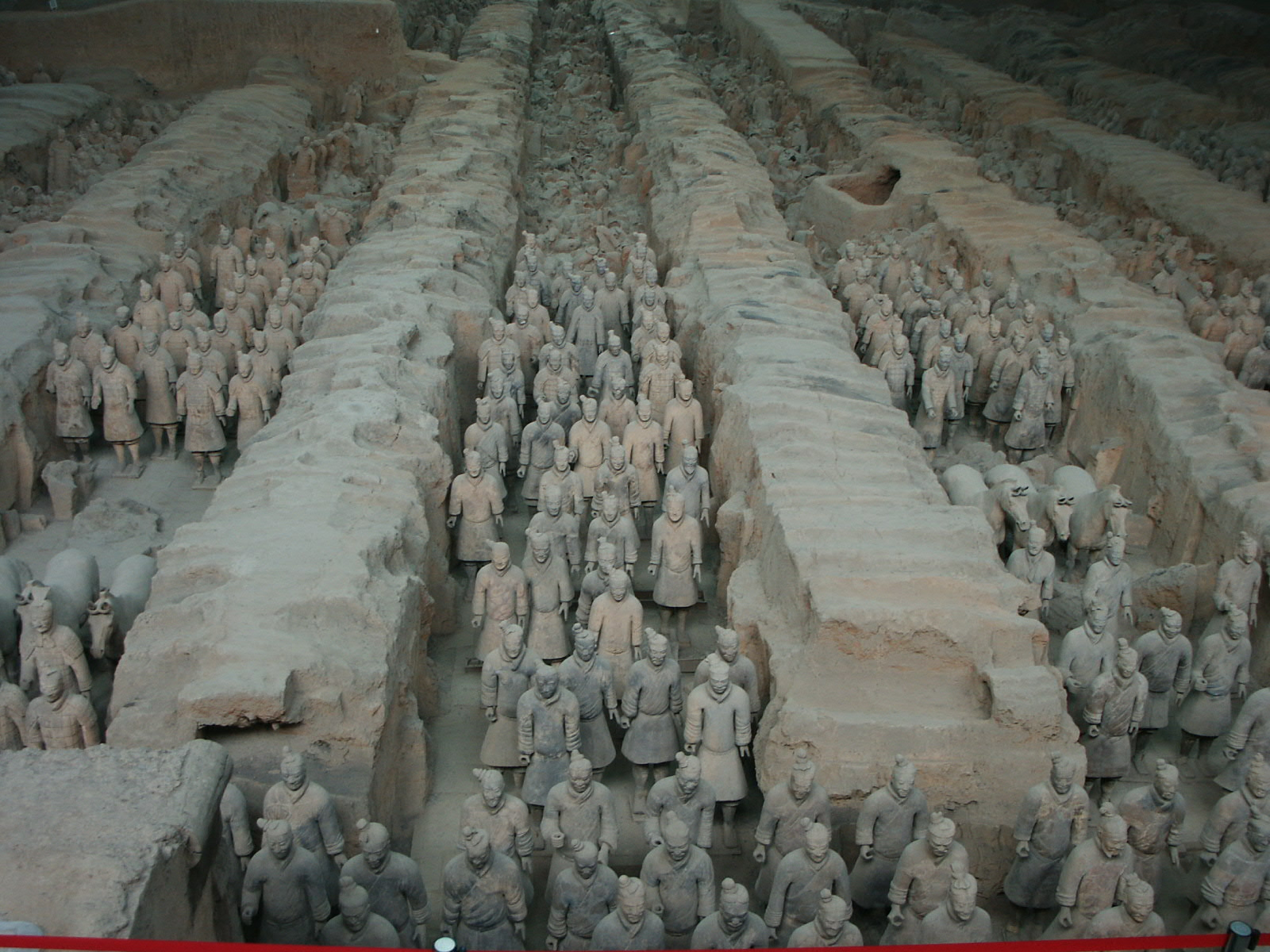
Terracotta Army following excavation, China

It is valuable to examine pottery as an archaeological record of potential interactions between peoples. When pottery is placed within the context of linguistic and migratory patterns, it becomes an even more prevalent category of social artifact. As proposed by Olivier P. Gosselain, it is possible to understand ranges of cross-cultural interaction by looking closely at the chaîne opératoire of ceramic production.

The methods used to produce pottery in early Sub-Saharan Africa fall into three categories: techniques visible (decoration, firing, and post-firing techniques), techniques related to the materials (selection or processing of clay, etc.), and techniques for molding or fashioning the clay. These three categories can be used to consider the implications of the recurrence of a particular sort of pottery in different areas. Generally, the techniques that are easily visible (the first category mentioned above) are readily imitated and may indicate a more distant connection between groups, such as trade in the same market or even relatively close settlements. Techniques that require more studied replication (i.e., the selection of clay and the fashioning of clay) may indicate a closer connection between people, as these methods are usually only transmissible between potters and those otherwise directly involved in production. Such a relationship requires the ability of the involved parties to communicate effectively, implying pre-existing norms of contact or a shared language between the two. Thus, the patterns of technical diffusion in pot-making visible in archaeological findings also reveal patterns of societal interaction.

Chronologies based on pottery are often essential for dating non-literate cultures and helpful for dating historic cultures as well. Trace-element analysis, mostly by neutron activation, allows the sources of clay to be accurately identified, and the thermoluminescence test can be used to provide an estimate of the date of last firing. Examining sherds from prehistory, scientists learned that during high-temperature firing, iron materials in clay record the state of the Earth's magnetic field at that moment.

=== Fabric analysis ===
The "clay body" is also called the "paste" or the "fabric", which consists of 2 things, the "clay matrix" – composed of grains of less than 0.02 mm grains which can be seen using the high-powered microscopes or a scanning electron microscope, and the "clay inclusions" – which are larger grains of clay and could be seen with the naked eye or a low-power binocular microscope. For geologists, fabric analysis means the spatial arrangement of minerals in a rock. For Archaeologists, the "fabric analysis" of pottery entails the study of clay matrix and inclusions in the clay body, as well as the firing temperature and conditions. Analysis is done to examine the following 3 in detail:

- How pottery was made, e.g., material, design, such as shape and style, etc.
- Its decorations, such as patterns, colors of patterns, slipped (glazing), or unslipped decoration
- Evidence of the type of use.

The Six fabrics of Kalibangan is a good example of fabric analysis.

== Clay bodies and raw materials ==
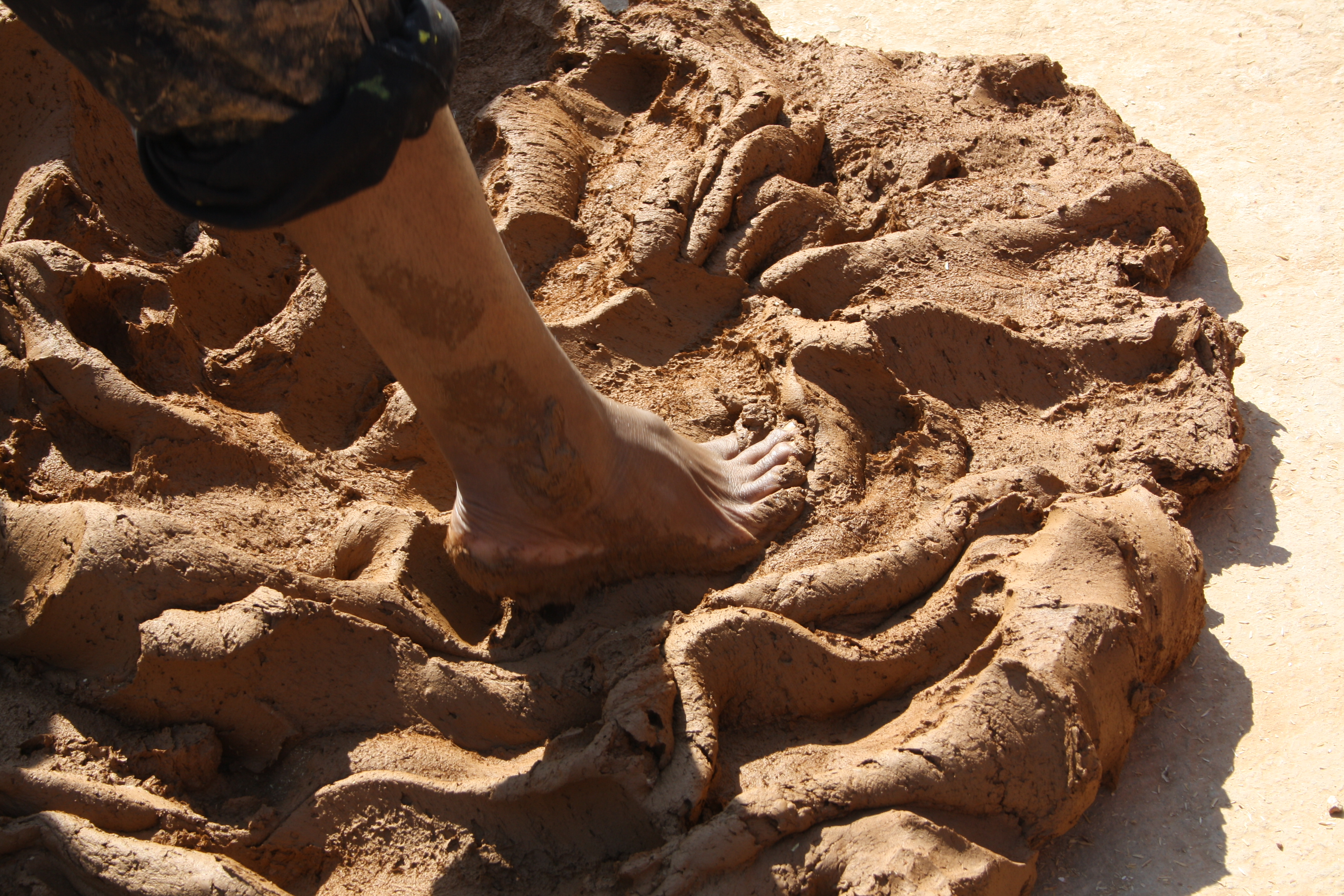
Preparation of clay for pottery in India

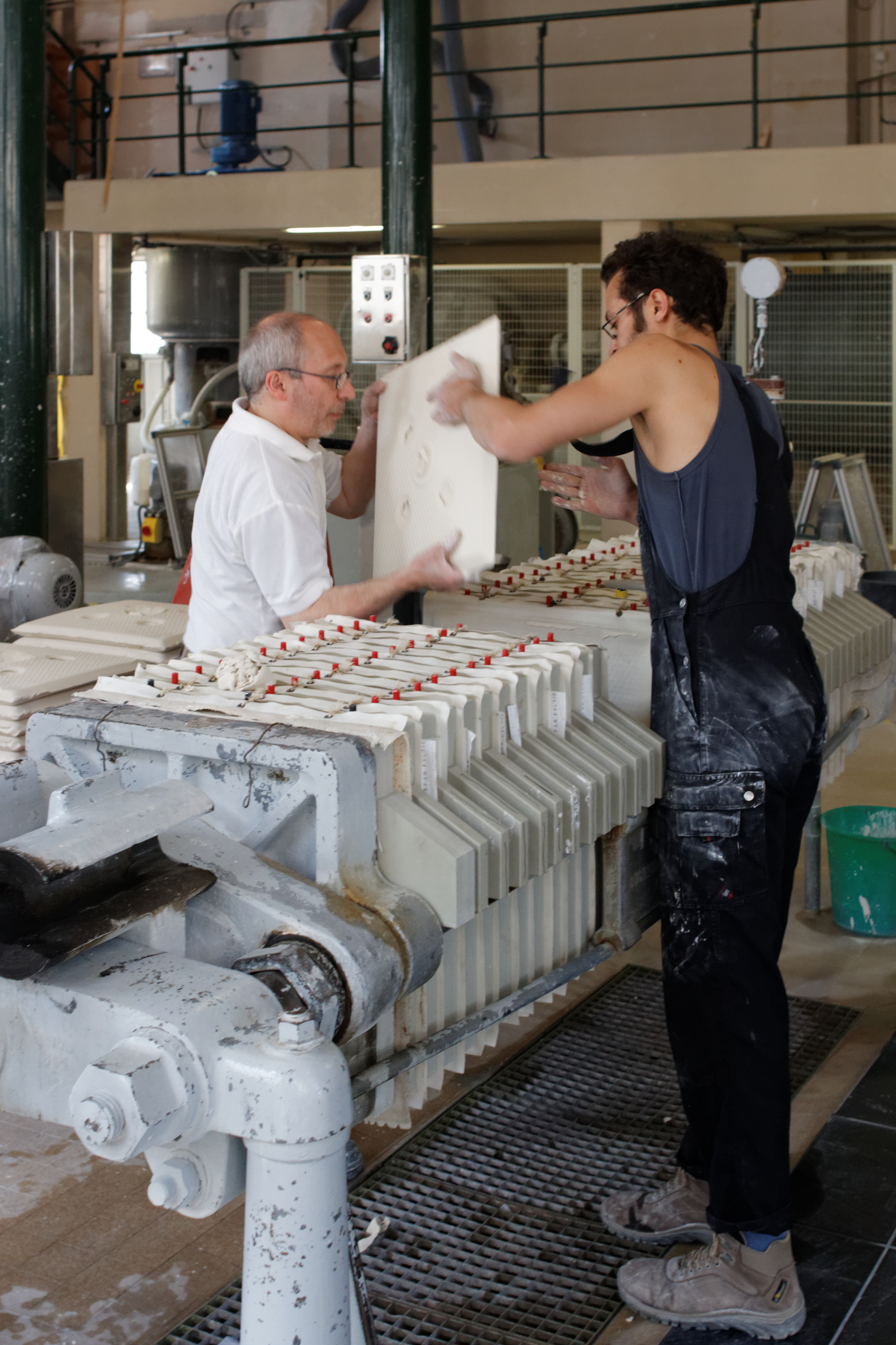
Removing a filter cake of porcelain body from a filter press

Body, or clay body, is the material used to form pottery. Thus, a potter might prepare or order from a supplier such an amount of earthenware, stoneware, or porcelain body. The compositions of clay bodies vary considerably, and include both prepared and 'as dug'; the former being by far the dominant type for studio and industry. The properties also vary considerably, and include plasticity and mechanical strength before firing; the firing temperature needed to mature them; properties after firing, such as permeability, mechanical strength, and colour.

There can be regional variations in the properties of raw materials used for pottery, and these can lead to wares that are unique in character to a locality.

The main ingredient of the body is clay. Some different types used for pottery include:

- Kaolin, sometimes referred to as china clay, is a key ingredient in porcelain, which was first used in China around the 7th and 8th centuries.
- Ball clay: An extremely plastic, fine grained sedimentary clay, which may contain some organic matter.
- Fire clay: A clay having a slightly lower percentage of fluxes than kaolin, but usually quite plastic. It is a highly heat-resistant form of clay that can be combined with other clays to increase the firing temperature and may be used as an ingredient to make stoneware-type bodies.
- Stoneware clay: Suitable for creating stoneware. Has many characteristics of both fire clay and ball clay, with a finer grain like ball clay, but is more heat-resistant like fire clay.
- Common red clay and shale clay have vegetable and ferric oxide impurities, which make them useful for bricks, but are generally unsatisfactory for pottery except under special conditions of a particular deposit.
- Bentonite: An extremely plastic clay which can be added in small quantities to short clay to increase the plasticity.

It is common for clays and other raw materials to be mixed to produce clay bodies suited to specific purposes. Various mineral processing techniques are often utilised before mixing the raw materials, with comminution being effectively universal for non-clay materials.

Examples of non-clay materials include:

- Feldspar, act as fluxes which lower the vitrification temperature of bodies.
- Quartz plays an important role in attenuating drying shrinkage.
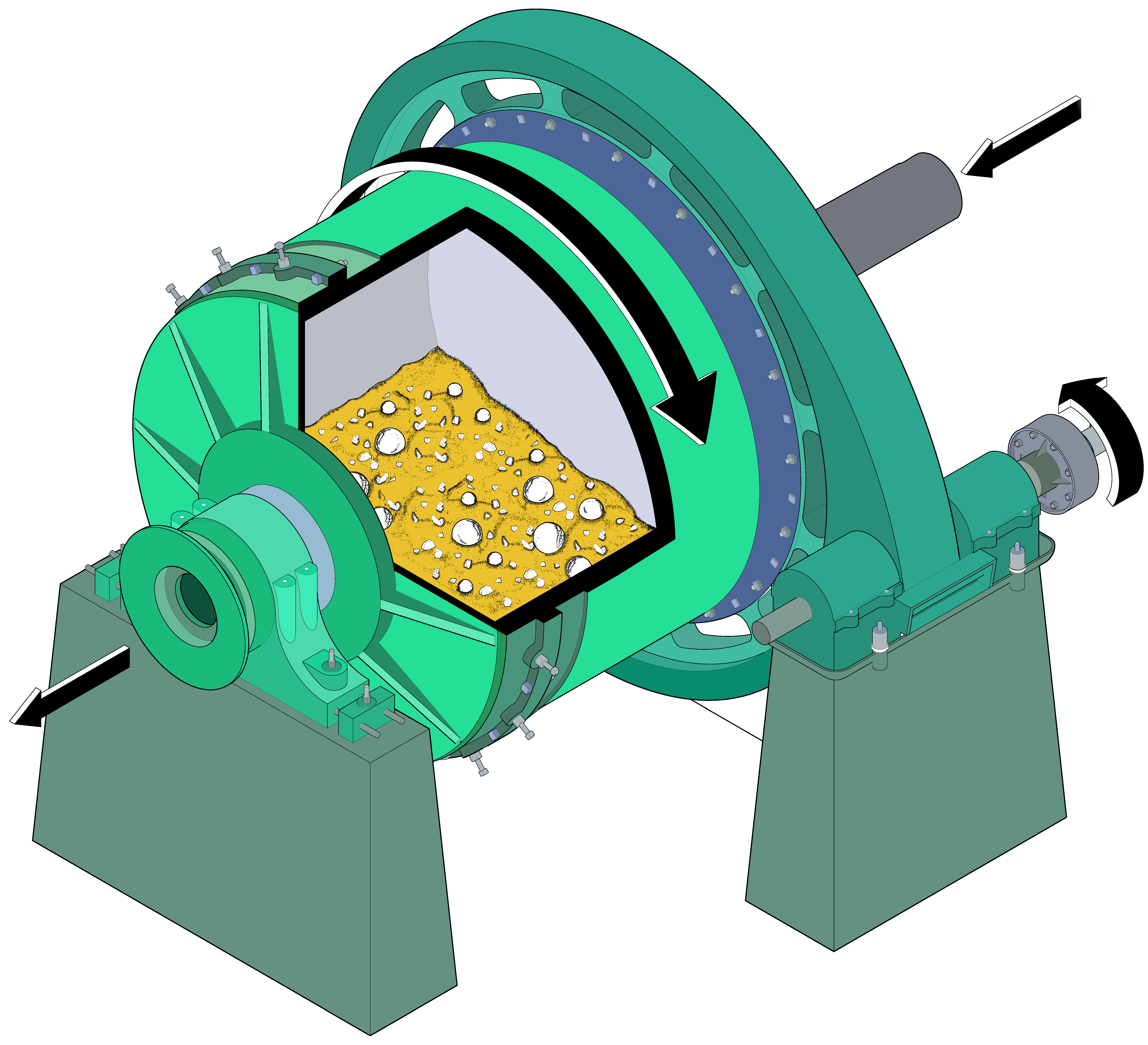
  A section cut-through of a ball mill, which is widely used to mill raw materials for pottery
- Nepheline syenite, an alternative to feldspar.
- Calcined alumina can enhance the fired properties of a body.
- Chamotte, also called grog, is fired clay that is crushed, and sometimes then milled. Helps attenuate drying shrinkage.
- Bone ash, produced by the calcination of animal bone. A key raw material for bone china.
- Frit, produced by quenching and breaking up a glass of a specific composition. It can be used in low additions in some bodies, but common uses include as components of a glaze or enamel, or for the body of fritware, when it is usually mixed with larger quantities of quartz sand.
- Various others at low levels of addition such as dolomite, limestone, talc and wollastonite.

== Production ==
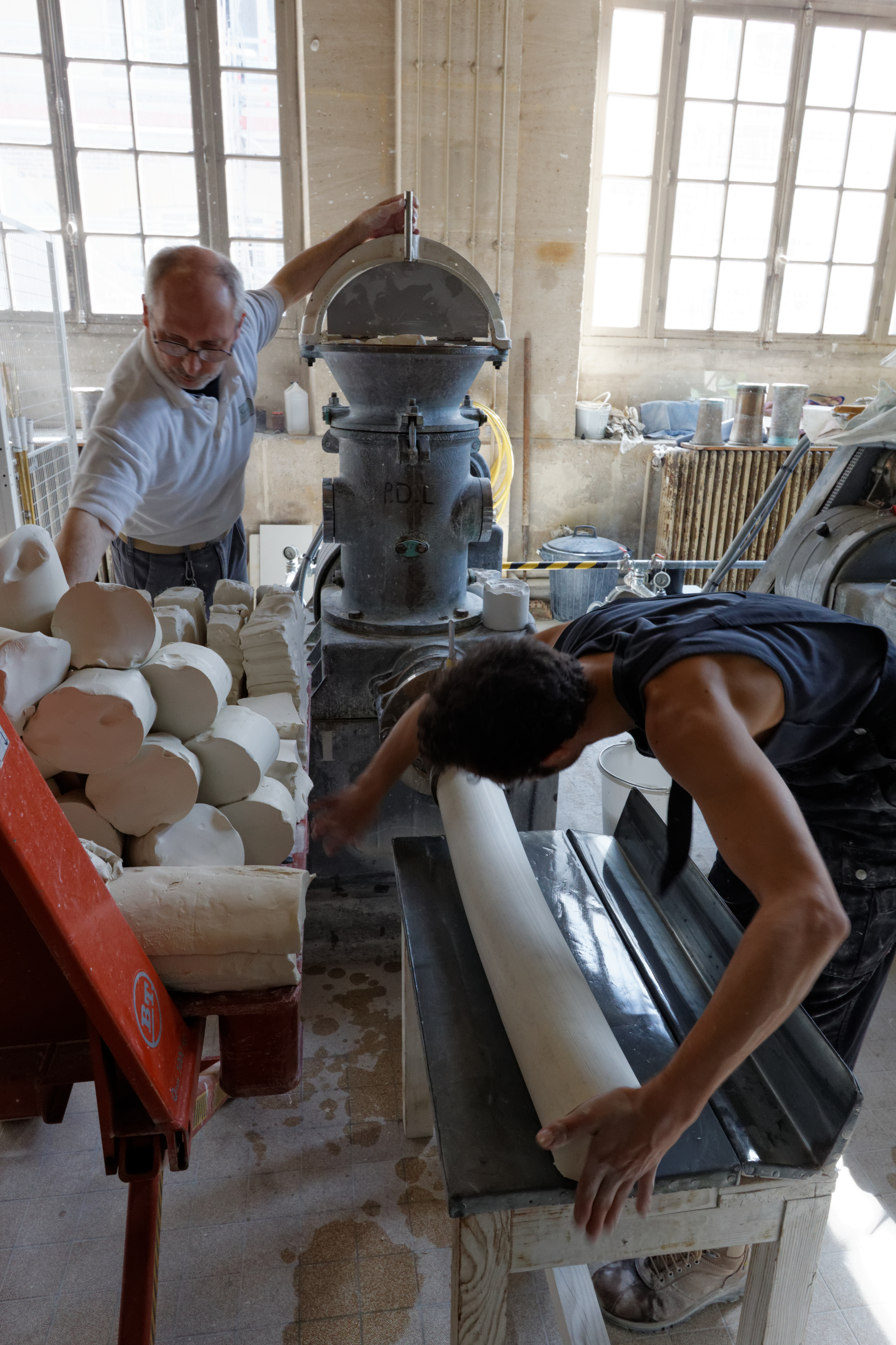
Clay body being extruded from a de-airing pug

The production of pottery includes the following stages:

- Preparing the clay body.
- Shaping
- Drying
- Firing
- Glazing and decorating. (This can be undertaken before firing. Also, additional firing stages after decoration may be needed.)

=== Shaping ===
Before being shaped, clay must be prepared. This may include kneading to ensure an even moisture content throughout the body. Air trapped within the clay body needs to be removed, or de-aired, and can be accomplished either by a machine called a vacuum pug or manually by wedging. Wedging can also help produce an even moisture content. Once a clay body has been kneaded and de-aired or wedged, it is shaped by a variety of techniques, which include:

- Hand-building: This is the earliest forming method. Wares can be constructed by hand from coils of clay, combining flat slabs of clay, or pinching solid balls of clay, or some combination of these. Parts of hand-built vessels are often joined with the aid of slip. Some studio potters find hand-building more conducive for one-of-a-kind works of art.
  A potter using a potter's wheel describes his materials (in Romanian and English)
- The potter's wheel: In a process called "throwing" (coming from the Old English word thrawan which means to twist or turn) a ball of clay is placed in the centre of a turntable, called the wheel-head, which the potter rotates with a stick, with foot power, or with a variable-speed electric motor. During throwing, the wheel rotates while the solid ball of soft clay is pressed, squeezed, and gently pulled upwards and outwards into a hollow shape. Skill and experience are required to throw pots to an acceptable standard, and while the ware may have high artistic merit, the method's reproducibility is poor. Because of its inherent limitations, throwing can only be used to create wares with radial symmetry on a vertical axis.
- Press moulding: a simple technique of shaping by manually pressing a lump of clay body into a porous mould.
- Granulate pressing: a highly automated technique of shaping by pressing clay body in a semi-dry and granulated form in a mould. The body is pressed into the mould by a porous die through which water is pumped at high pressure. The fine, free-flowing granulated body is prepared by spray drying a high-solids content slip. Granulate pressing, also known as dust pressing, is widely used in the manufacture of ceramic tiles and, increasingly, of plates.
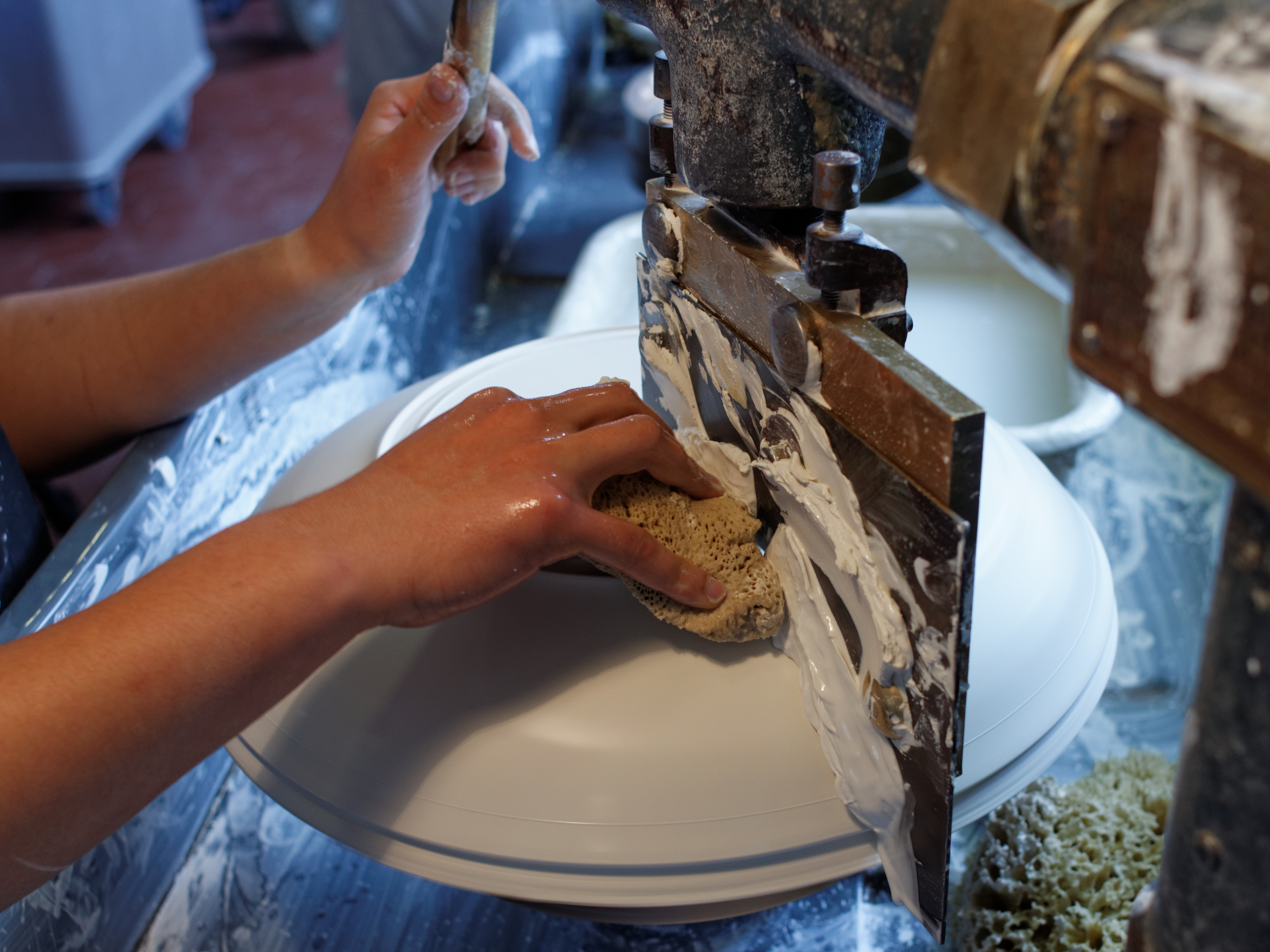
  Jiggering a plate
- Jiggering and jolleying: These operations are carried out on the potter's wheel and allow the time taken to bring wares to a standardized form to be reduced. Jiggering is the operation of bringing a shaped tool into contact with the plastic clay of a piece under construction, the piece itself being set on a rotating plaster mould on the wheel. The jigger tool shapes one face while the mould shapes the other. Jiggering is used only in the production of flatware, such as plates, but a similar operation, jolleying, is used in the production of hollowware, such as cups. Jiggering and jolleying have been used in pottery production since at least the 18th century. In large-scale factory production, jiggering and jolleying are usually automated, allowing these operations to be carried out by semi-skilled labour.
- Roller-head machine: This machine is for shaping wares on a rotating mould, as in jiggering and jolleying, but with a rotary shaping tool replacing the fixed profile. The rotary shaping tool is a shallow cone with the same diameter as the ware being formed, shaped to the desired form of the back of the article being made. Wares may in this way be shaped, using relatively unskilled labour, in one operation at a rate of about twelve pieces per minute, though this varies with the size of the articles being produced. Developed in the UK just after World War II by the company Service Engineers, the roller-head method was quickly adopted by manufacturers worldwide; it remains the dominant method for producing both flatware and hollowware, such as plates and mugs.
- Pressure casting: Is a development of traditional slipcasting. Specially developed polymeric materials allow a mould to be subject to external pressures of up to 4.0 MPa, so much higher than slip casting in plaster moulds, where the capillary forces correspond to a pressure of around 0.1–0.2 MPa. The high pressure leads to much faster casting rates and, hence, faster production cycles. Furthermore, applying high-pressure air through the polymeric moulds upon demoulding the cast enables a new casting cycle to begin immediately in the same mould, unlike plaster moulds, which require lengthy drying times. Polymeric materials have much greater durability than plaster; therefore, it is possible to achieve shaped products with better dimensional tolerances and much longer mould life. Pressure casting was developed in the 1970s for the production of sanitaryware, although, more recently, it has been applied to tableware.
- RAM pressing: This is used to shape ware by pressing a bat of prepared clay body into a required shape between two porous moulding plates. After pressing, compressed air is blown through the porous mould plates to release the shaped wares.
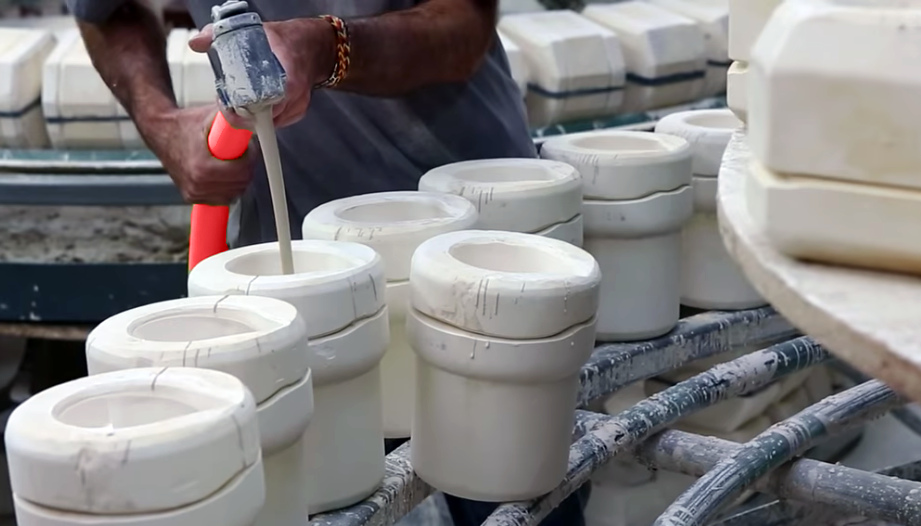
  Filling a plaster mould with slip
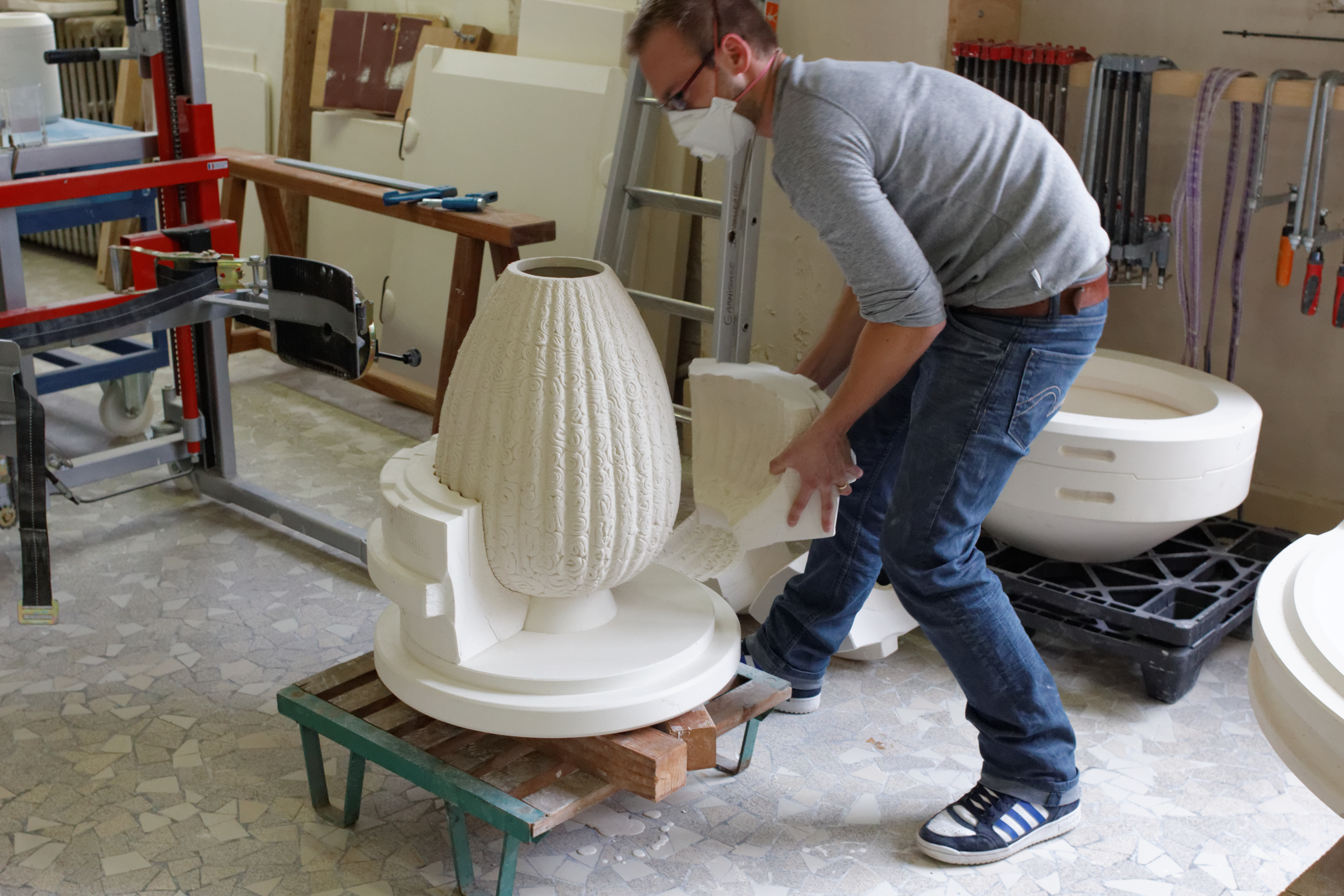
  De-moulding a large vase after it has been slip cast
- Slip casting: This is suited to the making of shapes that other methods cannot form. A liquid slip, made by mixing clay body with water, is poured into a highly absorbent plaster mould. Water from the slip is absorbed into the mould, leaving a layer of clay body that covers its internal surfaces and takes its internal shape. Excess slip is poured out of the mould, which is then split open, and the moulded object removed. Slip casting is widely used in the production of sanitaryware and for making other complex-shaped ware, such as teapots and figurines.
- Injection moulding: This is a shape-forming process adapted for the tableware industry from the method long established for the forming of thermoplastic and some metal components. It has been called Porcelain Injection Moulding, or PIM. Suited to the mass production of complex-shaped articles, one significant advantage of the technique is that it allows the production of a cup, including the handle, in a single process, and thereby eliminates the handle-fixing operation and produces a stronger bond between cup and handle. The feed to the mould die is a mix of approximately 50 to 60 per cent unfired body in powder form, together with 40 to 50 per cent organic additives composed of binders, lubricants and plasticisers. The technique is not as widely used as other shaping methods. Injection moulding of ceramic tableware has been developed, though it has yet to be fully commercialised.
- 3D printing: There are two methods. One involves the layered deposition of soft clay body similar to fused deposition modelling (FDM), and the other uses powder binding techniques where clay body in dry powder form is fused layer upon layer with a liquid.

=== Drying ===
Before firing, the water in an article needs to be removed. Several different stages, or conditions of the article, can be identified:

- Greenware refers to unfired objects at any stage of dryness, but is most often used to refer to objects ready to be fired.
- Plastic is condition of a clay body that has sufficient moisture, around 20%, to be shaped without cracking.
- Leather-hard refers to a clay body that has been dried partially. At this stage, the clay object has approximately 15% moisture content. Clay bodies at this stage are very firm and only slightly pliable. Trimming and handle attachment often occur at the leather-hard state.
- Bone-dry refers to clay bodies when they reach a moisture content at or near 0%. At that moisture content, the item is ready to be fired. Additionally, the piece is extremely brittle at this stage and must be handled with care.

Chamber dryers are rooms with controlled environments used for the uniform removal of moisture from ceramic ware before firing.. By regulating temperature, humidity, and airflow, chamber dryers prevent the uneven shrinkage and cracking that often plague ambient-air drying. Modern systems often utilise "waste heat" from kilns to increase energy efficiency, maintaining precise "drying curves" tailored to specific clay bodies.. This stage is critical for ensuring structural integrity, as any residual deep-seated moisture can lead to catastrophic steam explosions during the high-heat firing process.

=== Firing ===
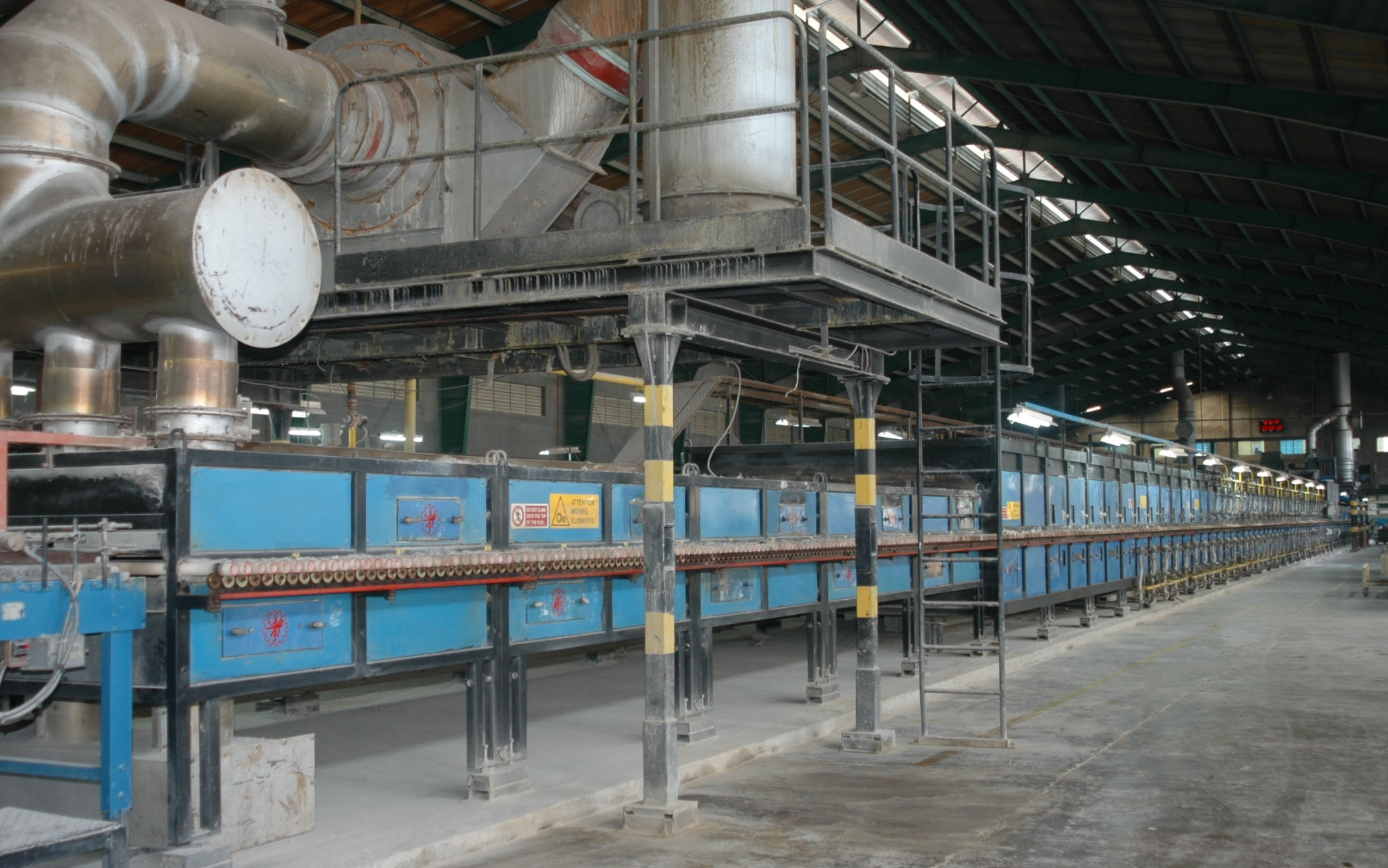
A modern tunnel kiln

Firing produces permanent and irreversible chemical and physical changes in the body. It is only after firing that the article or material is pottery. In lower-fired pottery, the changes include sintering, the fusing together of coarser particles in the body at their points of contact with each other. In the case of porcelain, where higher firing temperatures are used, the physical, chemical, and mineralogical properties of the constituents in the body are greatly altered. In all cases, the reason for firing is to harden the wares permanently, and the firing regime must be appropriate to the materials used.

==== Temperature ====
As a rough guide, modern earthenwares are normally fired at temperatures in the range of about 1,000–1,200 °C (1,830–2,190 °F); stonewares between about 1,100–1,300 °C (2,010–2,370 °F); and porcelains between about 1,200–1,400 °C (2,190–2,550 °F). Historically, reaching high temperatures was a long-lasting challenge, and earthenware can be fired effectively as low as 600 °C (1,112 °F), achievable in primitive pit firing. The time spent at any particular temperature is also important; the combination of heat and time is known as heatwork.

Kilns can be monitored by pyrometers, thermocouples and pyrometric devices.

==== Atmosphere ====
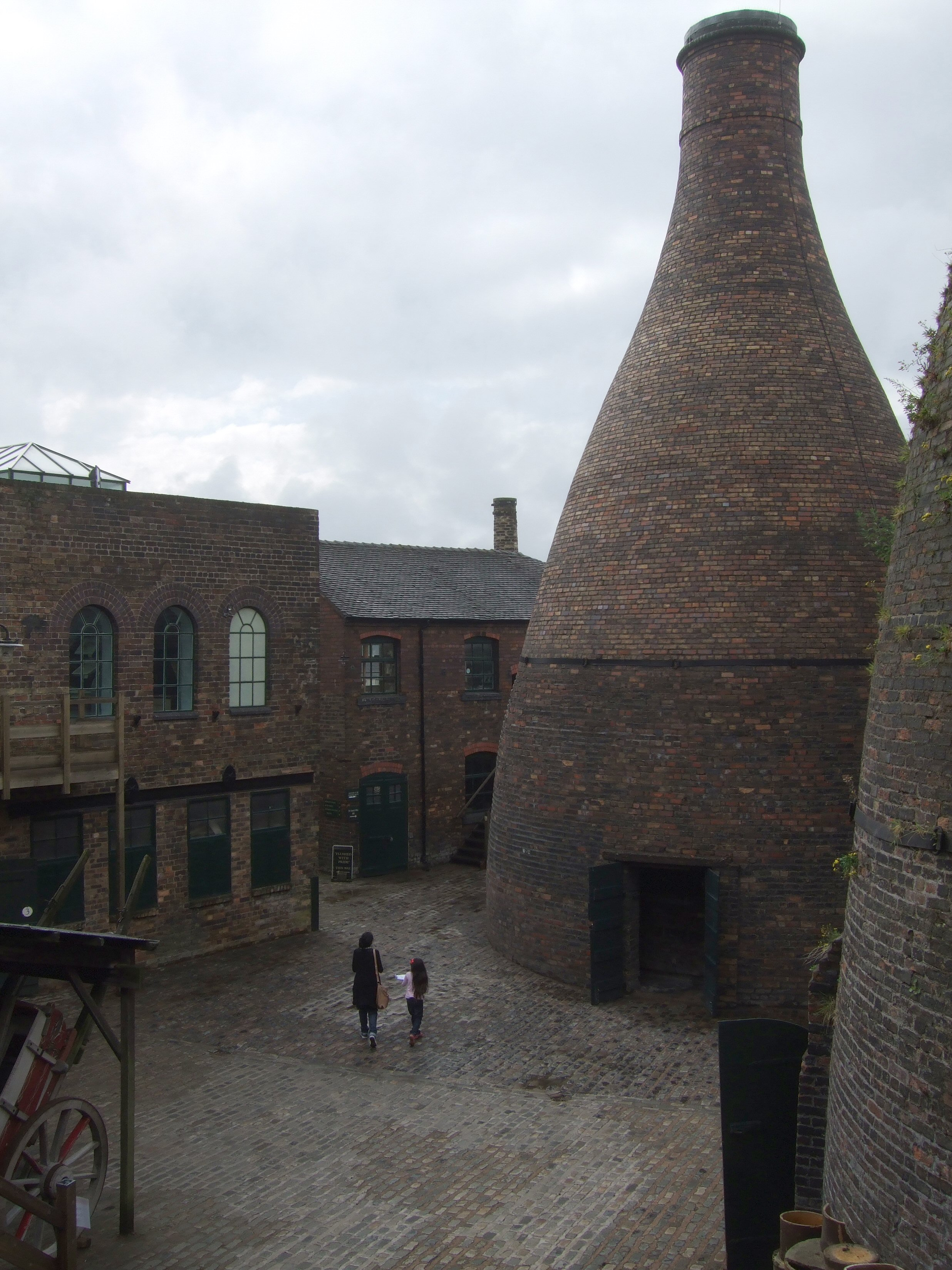
A bottle kiln

The atmosphere within a kiln during firing can affect the appearance of the body and glaze. Key to this is the differing colours of the various oxides of iron, such as iron(III) oxide (also known as ferric oxide or Fe_{2}O_{3}) which is associated with brown-red colours, whilst iron(II) oxide (also known as ferrous oxide or FeO) is associated with much darker colours, including black. The oxygen concentration in the kiln influences the type, and relative proportions, of these iron oxides in fired the body and glaze: for example, where there is a lack of oxygen during firing the associated carbon monoxide (CO) will readily react with oxygen in Fe_{2}O_{3} in the raw materials and cause it to be reduced to FeO.

An oxygen-deficient condition, called a reducing atmosphere, is generated by preventing the complete combustion of the kiln fuel; this is achieved by deliberately restricting the air supply or by supplying an excess of fuel.

==== Methods ====
Pottery can be fired using a variety of methods, with a kiln being the most common. Both the maximum temperature and the firing duration influence the final characteristics of the ceramic. Thus, the maximum temperature within a kiln is often held constant for a period of time to soak the wares to produce the maturity required in the body of the wares.

Niche techniques include:

- In a Western adaptation of traditional Japanese raku ware firing, wares are removed from the kiln while hot and smothered in ashes, paper, or woodchips, which produces a distinctive carbonised appearance. This technique is also used in Malaysia in creating traditional labu sayong.
- In Mali, a firing mound is used rather than a brick or stone kiln. Unfired pots are first brought to the place where a mound will be built, customarily by the women and girls of the village. The mound's foundation is made by placing sticks on the ground, then:
  [...] pots are positioned on and amid the branches, and then grass is piled high to complete the mound. Although the mound contains the pots of many women, who are related through their husbands' extended families, each woman is responsible for her own or her immediate family's pots within the mound.
  When a mound is completed, and the ground around has been swept clean of residual combustible material, a senior potter lights the fire. A handful of grass is lit, and the woman runs around the circumference of the mound, touching the burning torch to the dried grass. Some mounds are still being constructed, as others are already burning.

==== Fuel ====
Kilns may be heated by burning combustible materials, such as wood, coal and gas, or by electricity. The use of microwave energy has been investigated. The use of hydrogen as a fuel for the firing of whiteware ceramics reached a significant milestone in early 2025 with the successful deployment of large-scale pilot kilns utilising 100% hydrogen, building upon feasibility trials that began in late 2019 to decarbonize the production process.

Sustainable firing repurposes organic waste such as animal dung, rice chaff and more unusual fuels such as dried seaweed, olive stones and nut shells. These traditional materials provide localised energy sources, and may create unique surface effects from specific vapours. Modern equivalents include filtered Waste Vegetable Oil and Biodiesel, which offer cleaner-burning liquid alternatives. Similarly, compressed Biomass Pellets provide automated consistency while Biogas from anaerobic digestion replaces fossil-based methane. Feasibility studies have demonstrated that these waste-derived fuels are technically viable for industrial whiteware production.

When used as fuels, coal and wood can introduce smoke, soot and ash into the kiln, which can affect the appearance of unprotected wares. For this reason, wares fired in wood- or coal-fired kilns are often placed in saggars, ceramic boxes, to protect them. Modern kilns fuelled by gas or electricity are cleaner and more easily controlled than older wood- or coal-fired kilns and often allow shorter firing times.

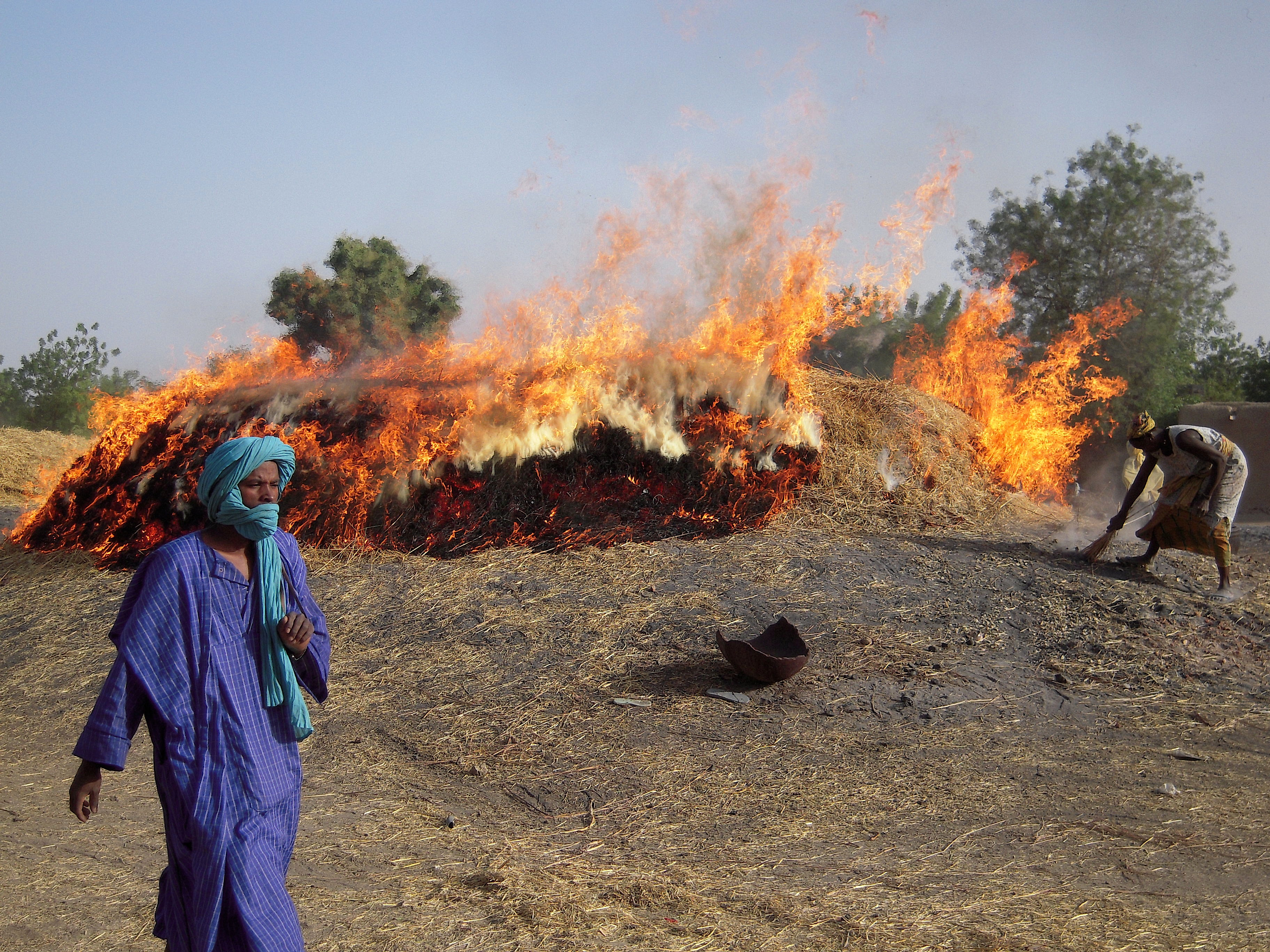
Pottery firing mound in Kalabougou, Mali. Much of the earliest pottery would have been fired similarly.

==== Stages ====
- Biscuit (or bisque) refers to the clay after the object is shaped to the desired form and fired in the kiln for the first time, known as "bisque fired" or "biscuit fired". This firing results in both chemical and physical changes to the minerals of the clay body.
- Glaze fired is the final stage of some pottery making, or glost fired. A glaze may be applied to the biscuit ware, and the object can be decorated in several ways. After this, the object is "glazed fired", causing the glaze to melt and adhere to it. Depending on the temperature schedule, the glaze firing may also further mature the body as chemical and physical changes continue.

=== Decorating ===
Pottery may be decorated in many different ways. Some decoration can be done before or after the firing, and may be undertaken before or after glazing.

==== Methods ====
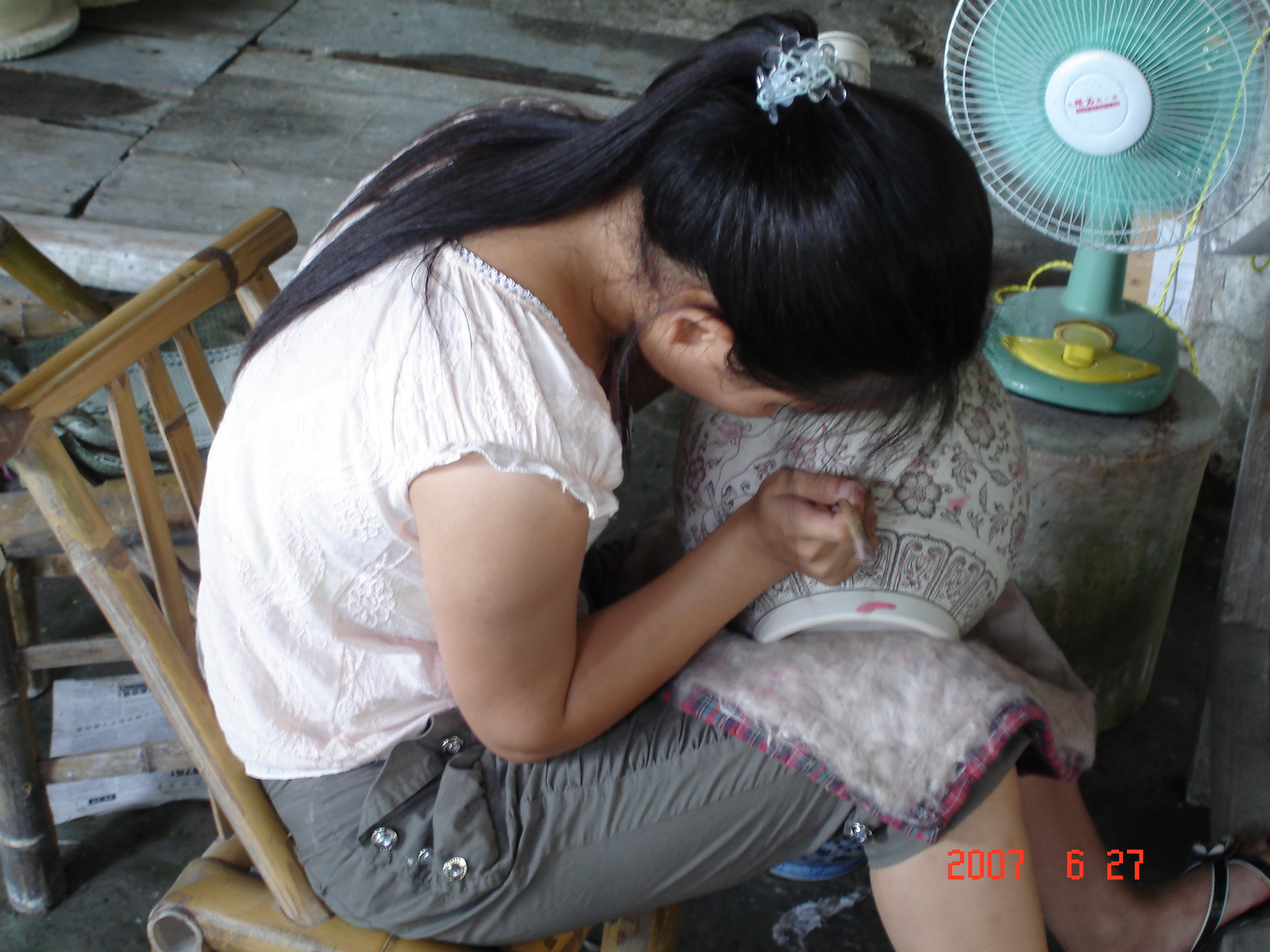
Hand painting a vase.

- Painting has been used since early prehistoric times, and can be very elaborate. The painting is often applied to pottery that has been fired once and may then be overlaid with a glaze. Many pigments change colour when fired, and the painter must allow for this.
- Glaze: Perhaps the most common form of decoration, which also serves as protection to the pottery, by being tougher and keeping liquid from penetrating the pottery. Glaze may be colourless, especially over painting, or coloured and opaque.
- Crystalline glaze: characterised by crystalline clusters of various shapes and colours embedded in a more uniform and opaque glaze, produced by the slow cooling of the glost fire.
- Carving: Pottery vessels may be decorated by shallow carving of the clay body, typically with a knife or similar instrument used on the wheel. This is common in Chinese porcelain of the classic period.
- Burnishing: The surface of pottery wares may be burnished before firing by rubbing with a suitable instrument of wood, steel, or stone to produce a polished finish that survives firing. It is possible to produce very highly polished wares when fine clays are used or when the polishing is carried out on wares that have been partially dried and contain little water, though wares in this condition are extremely fragile and the risk of breakage is high.
- Terra Sigillata is an ancient form of decorating ceramics that was first developed in Ancient Greece.
- Lithography, also called litho, although the alternative names of transfer print or "decal" are also common. These are used to apply designs to articles. The litho comprises three layers: the colour, or image, layer, which contains the decorative design; the cover coat, a clear protective layer that may incorporate a low-melting glass; and the backing paper on which the design is printed by screen printing or lithography. There are various methods for transferring the design while removing the backing paper, some of which are suited to machine application.
- Banding is the application by hand or by machine of a band of colour to the edge of a plate or cup. Also known as "lining", this operation is often carried out on a potter's wheel.
- Agateware: named after its resemblance to the mineral agate, is produced by partially blending clays of differing colours. In Japan, the term "neriage" is used, whilst in China, where such things have been made since at least the Tang dynasty, they are called "marbled" wares.
- Digital printing: high-resolution inkjet technology has been a recent, significant development Patented in the late 1990s and commercially viable by 2005, it became the tile industry standard by 2012 before extending into ceramic tableware. Using metal-oxide inks, printers replicate textures like marble with photorealistic precision. This non-contact method decorates irregular surfaces without damaging fragile pieces. It minimises waste and enables "on-demand" customisation, ensuring that no two items in a production run are identical.
- Pad printing: this indirect offset process, developed in the late 1940s, uses flexible silicone pads to transfer images from etched plates onto 3D objects. The pad conforms to concave or irregular pottery shapes with ease. It remains the industry standard for high-speed branding and opaque line work on mass-produced tableware.
- Engobe: a clay slip is used to coat the surface of pottery, usually before firing. Its purpose is often decorative, though it can also be used to mask undesirable features in the clay to which it is applied. The engobe may be applied by painting or by dipping to provide a uniform, smooth coating. Such decoration is characteristic of slipware. For sgraffito decoration, a layer of engobe is scratched through to reveal the underlying clay.
- Gold: Decoration with gold is used on some high-quality ware. Different methods exist for its application, including:
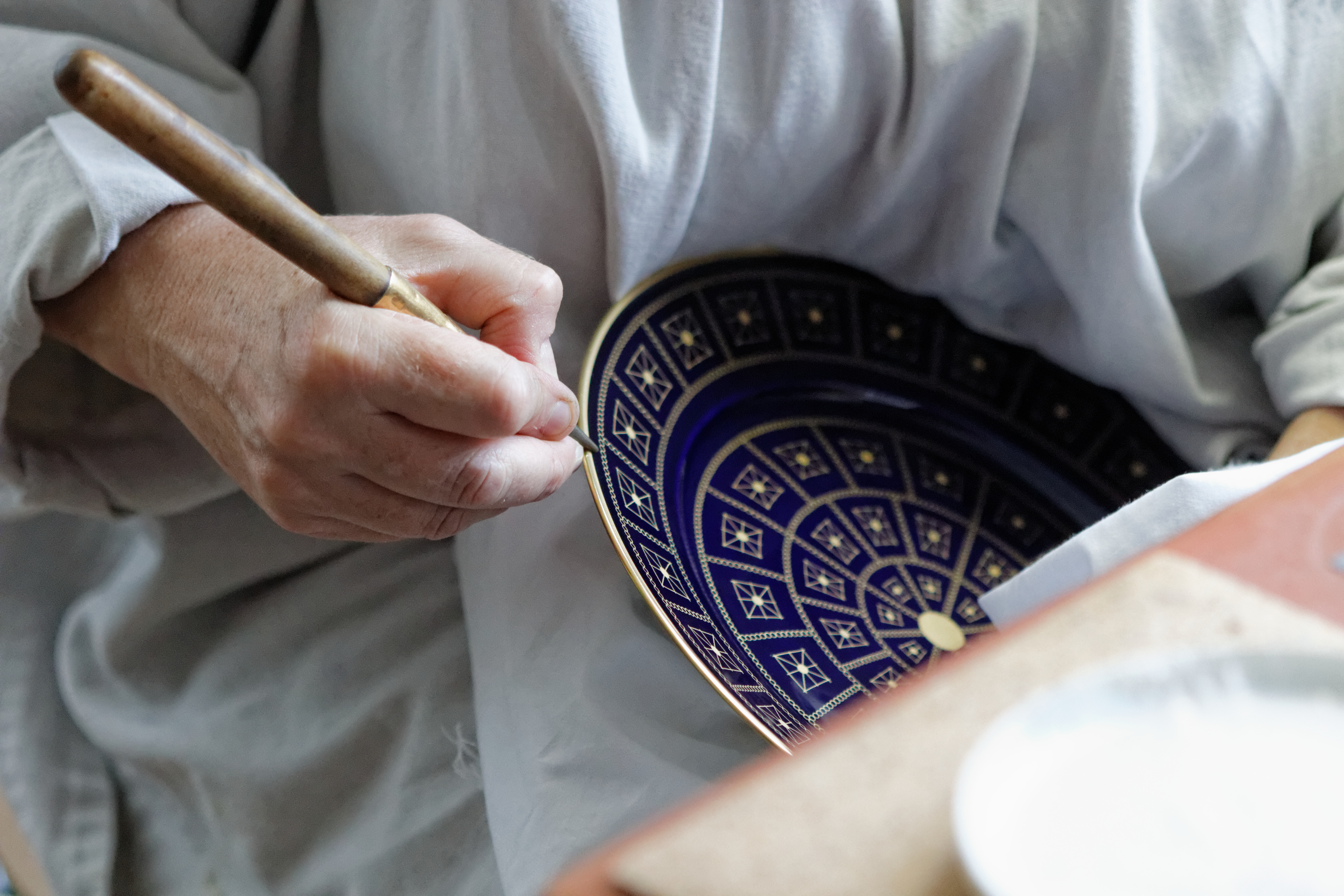
  Burnishing a plate's gold decoration
  - Best gold – a suspension of gold powder in essential oils mixed with a flux and a mercury salt extended. A painting technique can apply this. From the kiln, the decoration is dull and requires burnishing to reveal the full colour
  - Acid Gold – a form of gold decoration developed in the early 1860s at the English factory of Mintons Ltd. The glazed surface is etched with diluted hydrofluoric acid before application of the gold. The process demands great skill and is used for the decoration only of ware of the highest class.
  - Bright Gold – consists of a solution of gold sulphoresinate together with other metal resonates and a flux. The name derives from the appearance of the decoration immediately after removal from the kiln, as it requires no burnishing
  - Mussel Gold – an old method of gold decoration. It was made by rubbing together gold leaf, sugar, and salt, followed by washing to remove solubles
- Underglaze decoration is applied, by several techniques, onto ware before it is glazed; an example is blue and white wares. Several techniques can be applied.
- In-glaze decoration is applied on the surface of the glaze before the glost firing.
- On-glaze decoration is applied on top of the already fired, glazed surface, and then fixed in a second firing at a relatively low temperature.

=== Glazing ===
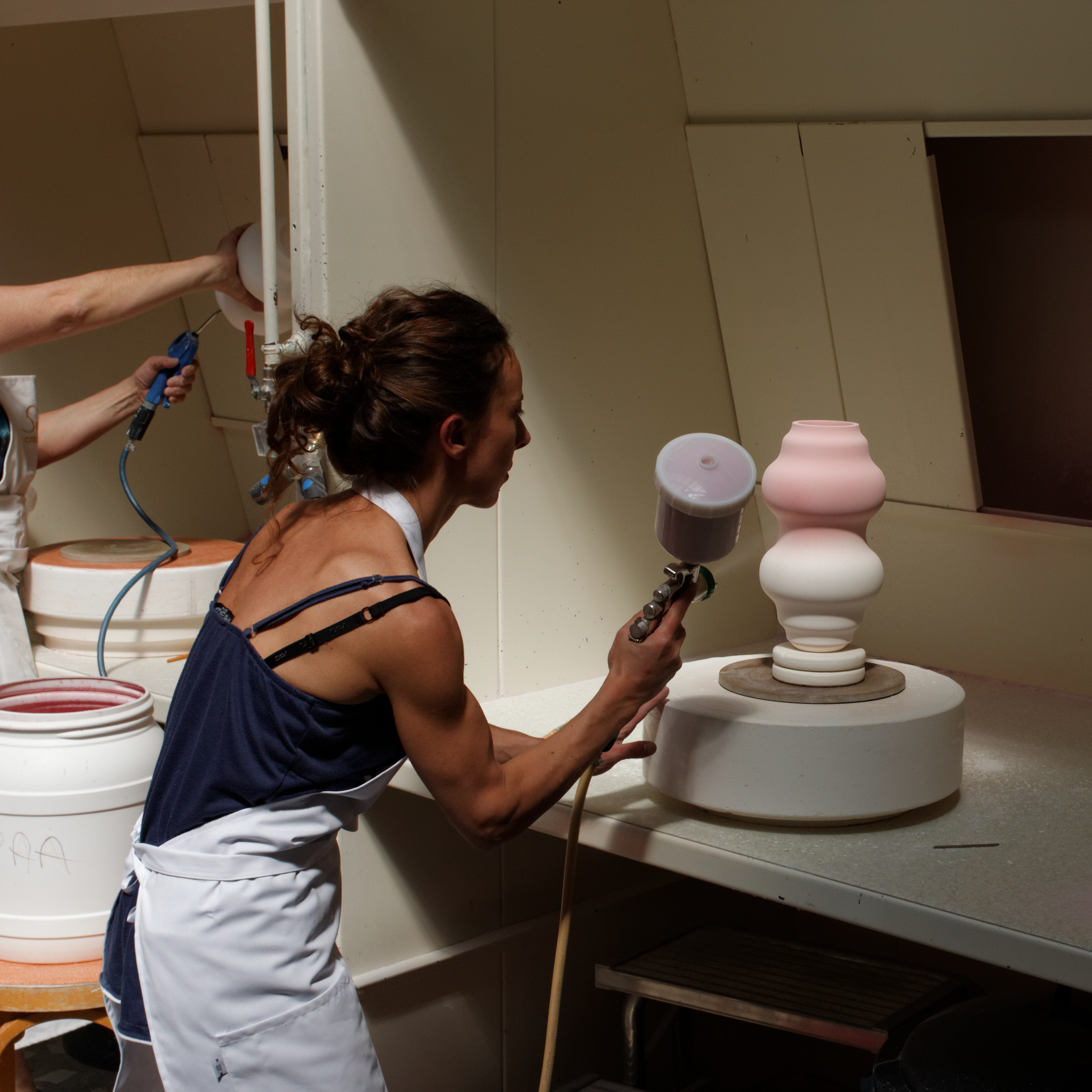
Spraying glaze onto a vase

Glaze is a glassy coating on pottery, and reasons to use it include decoration, ensuring the item is impermeable to liquids, and minimizing the adherence of pollutants.

Glaze may be applied by spraying, dipping, trailing, or brushing on an aqueous suspension of the unfired glaze. The colour of a glaze after firing may be significantly different from before firing. To prevent glazed wares sticking to kiln furniture during firing, either a small part of the object being fired (for example, the foot) is left unglazed or special refractory "spurs" are used as supports. These are removed and discarded after the firing.

Some specialised glazing techniques include:

- Salt-glazing – common salt is introduced to the kiln during the firing process. The high temperatures cause the salt to volatilise, depositing it on the surface of the ware, where it reacts with the body to form a sodium aluminosilicate glaze. In the 17th and 18th centuries, salt-glazing was used in the manufacture of domestic pottery. Now, except for use by some studio potters, the process is obsolete. The last large-scale application before its demise in the face of environmental clean air restrictions was in the production of salt-glazed sewer-pipes.
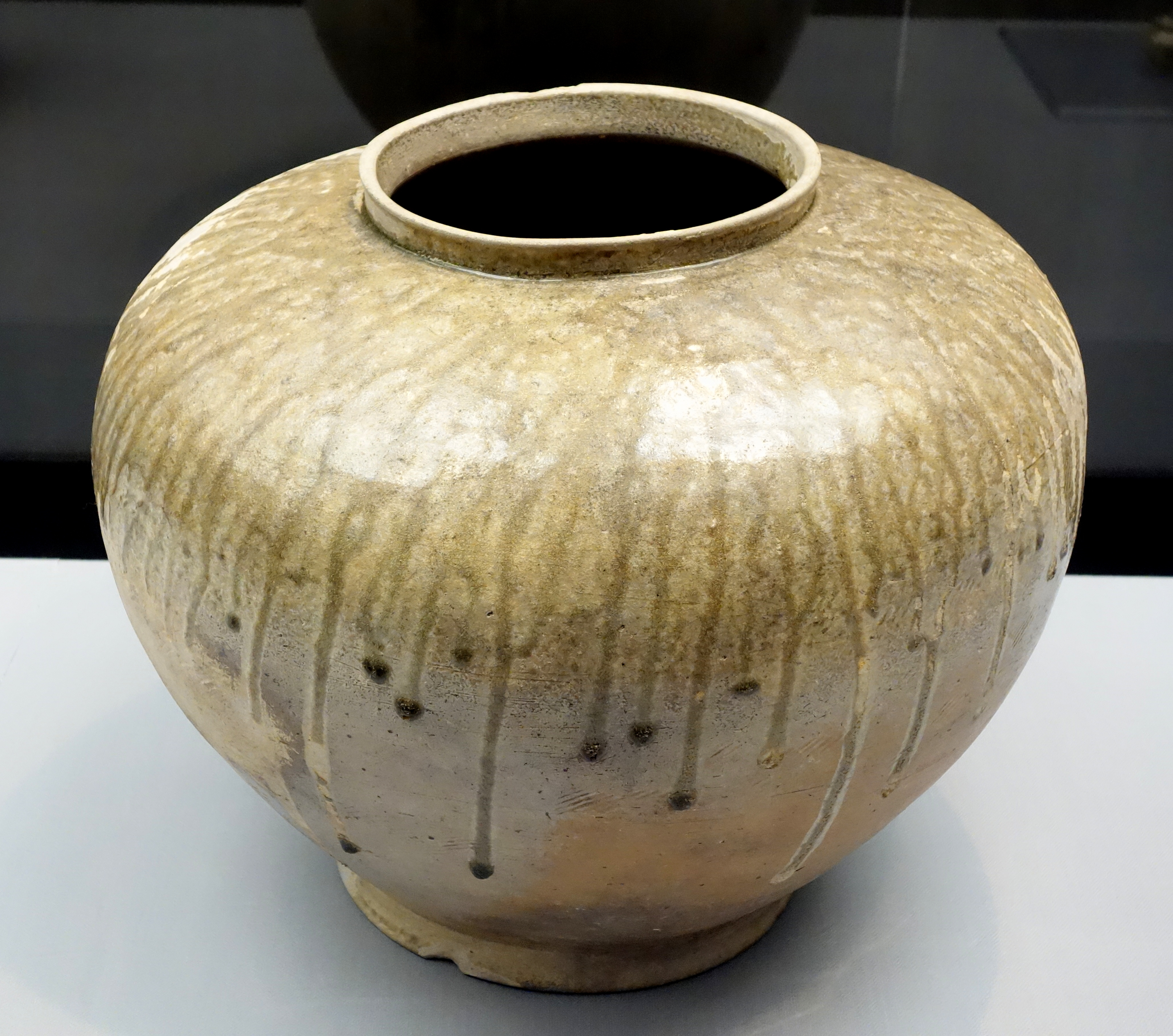
  Ash glazed jar from 9th century, Japan.
- Ash glazing – Ash from the combustion of plant matter has been used as the flux component of glazes. The ash generally came from combustion waste from kiln fuelling, although the potential of ash derived from arable crop wastes has been investigated. Ash glazes are of historical interest in the Far East, although there are reports of small-scale use in other locations such as the Catawba Valley Pottery in the United States. They are now limited to a small number of studio potters who value the unpredictability that arises from the raw material's variability.

=== Health and environmental issues ===
Although many of the environmental effects of pottery production have existed for millennia, some have been amplified by modern technology and production scales. The principal factors for consideration fall into two categories:

- Effects on workers: Notable risks include silicosis, heavy metal poisoning, poor indoor air quality, dangerous sound levels and possible over-illumination.
- Effects on the general environment.

Historically, lead poisoning (plumbism) was a significant health concern to those glazing pottery. This was recognised at least as early as the nineteenth century. The first legislation in the UK to limit pottery workers' exposure to lead was included in the Factories Act Extension Act in 1864, with further amendments introduced in 1899.

Silicosis is an occupational lung disease caused by inhaling large amounts of crystalline silica dust, usually over many years. Workers in the ceramic industry can develop it due to exposure to silica dust in the raw materials; colloquially, it has been known as 'Potter's rot'. Less than 10 years after its introduction in 1720 as a raw material for the British ceramics industry, the negative effects of calcined flint on workers' lungs had been noted. In one study reported in 2022, of 106 UK pottery workers, 55 per cent had at least some stage of silicosis. Exposure to siliceous dusts is reduced by either processing and using the source materials as aqueous suspension or as damp solids, or by the use of dust control measures such as local exhaust ventilation. These have been mandated by legislation, such as The Pottery (Health and Welfare) Special Regulations 1950 in the UK. The Health and Safety Executive in the UK has produced guidelines on controlling exposure to respirable crystalline silica in potteries, and the British Ceramics Federation provides a guidance booklet.

Environmental concerns include off-site water pollution, air pollution, disposal of hazardous materials, disposal of rejected ware and fuel consumption.

== History ==
Part of the history of pottery is prehistoric, dating to pre-literate cultures. Therefore, much of this history can only be found among the artifacts of archaeology. Because pottery is so durable, pottery and shards of pottery survive for millennia at archaeological sites and are typically the most common and important artifacts to survive. Many prehistoric cultures are named after the pottery that is the easiest way to identify their sites, and archaeologists have developed the ability to recognise different types from the chemistry of small shards.

Before pottery becomes part of a culture, several conditions must generally be met.

- First, there must be usable clay available. Archaeological sites where the earliest pottery was found were near deposits of readily available clay that could be properly shaped and fired. China has large deposits of a variety of clay, which gave it an advantage in the early development of fine pottery. Many countries have large deposits of various clays.
- Second, it must be possible to heat the pottery to temperatures that will achieve the transformation from raw clay to ceramic. Methods to reliably create fires hot enough to fire pottery did not develop until late in the development of cultures.
- Third, the potter must have time available to prepare, shape, and fire the clay into pottery. Even after control of fire was achieved, humans did not seem to develop pottery until a sedentary life was achieved. It has been hypothesized that pottery was developed only after humans established agriculture, which led to permanent settlements. However, the oldest known pottery is from the Czech Republic and dates to 28,000 BC, at the height of the most recent ice age, long before the beginnings of agriculture.
- Fourth, there must be a sufficient need for pottery to justify the resources required for its production.

=== Early pottery ===
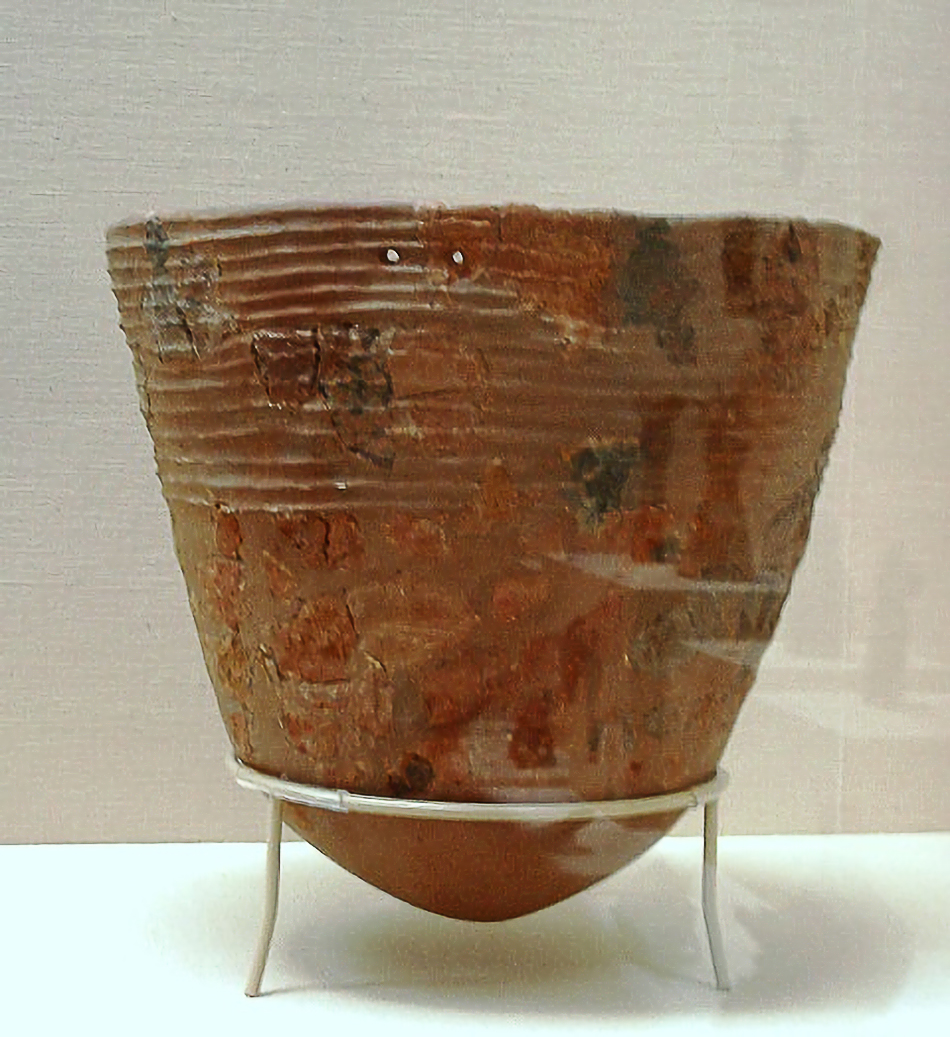
An Incipient Jōmon pottery vessel reconstructed from fragments (10,000–8,000 BC), Tokyo National Museum, Japan

- Methods of forming: Hand-shaping was the earliest method used to form vessels. This included the combination of pinching and coiling.
- Firing: The earliest method for firing pottery wares was the use of bonfires pit-fired pottery. Firing times might be short, but the peak temperatures achieved in the fire could be high, perhaps in the region of 900 °C (1,650 °F), and were reached very quickly.
- Clay: Early potters used whatever clay was available to them in their geographic vicinity. However, the lowest-quality common red clay was adequate for low-temperature fires used to make the earliest pots. Clay tempered with sand, grit, crushed shell, or crushed pottery was often used to make bonfire-fired ceramics because it provided an open-body texture that allowed water and the clay's volatile components to escape freely. The coarser particles in the clay also acted to restrain shrinkage during drying, thereby reducing the risk of cracking.
- Form: In the main, early bonfire-fired wares were made with rounded bottoms to avoid sharp angles that might be susceptible to cracking.
- Glazing: the earliest pots were not glazed.
- The potter's wheel was invented in Europe in the 5th millennium BC, and revolutionised pottery production. The earliest potter's wheel dates to the middle of the 5th millennium BC from the Cucuteni–Trypillia culture in western Ukraine.
- Moulds were used to a limited extent as early as the 5th and 6th century BC by the Etruscans and more extensively by the Romans.
- Slipcasting, a popular method for shaping irregularly shaped articles. It was first practised, to a limited extent, in China as early as the Tang dynasty.
- Transition to kilns: The earliest intentionally constructed were pit-kilns or trench-kilns, holes dug in the ground and covered with fuel. Holes in the ground provided insulation and improved control over firing.
- Kilns: Pit fire methods were adequate for simple earthenware, but other pottery types needed more sophisticated kilns.

=== History by region ===
==== Beginnings of pottery ====
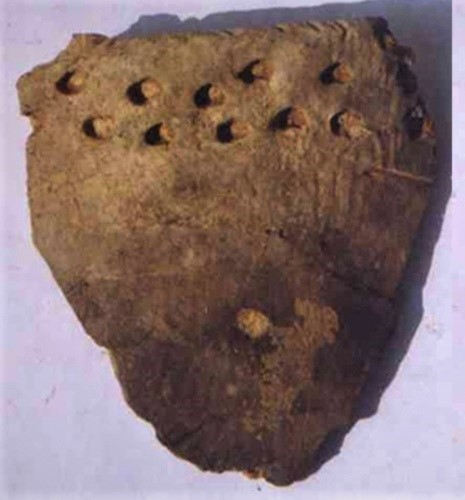
Xianren Cave pottery fragments, radiocarbon dated to circa 18,000 BC, China

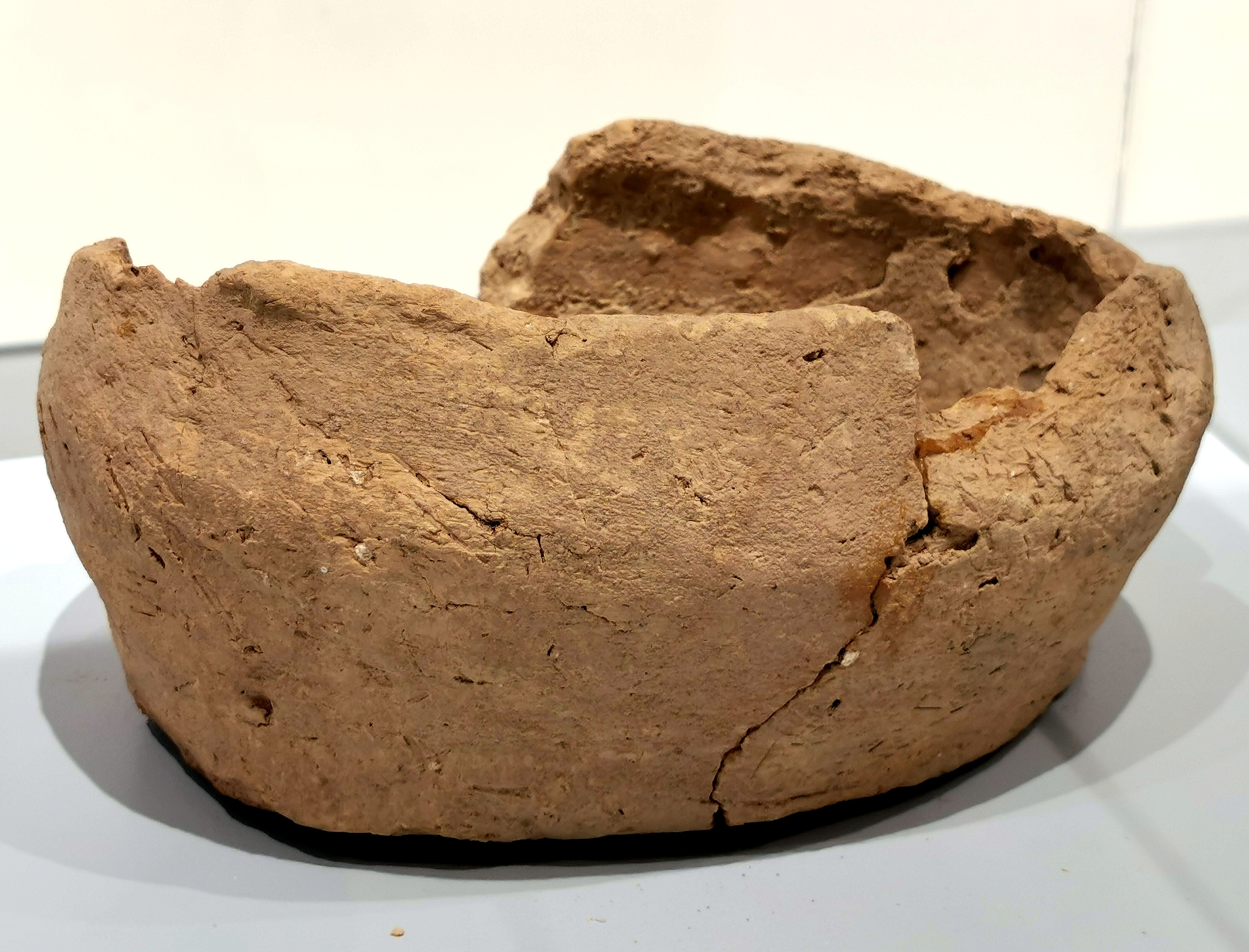
Pottery bowl from Jarmo, Mesopotamia, 7100–5800 BC.

Pottery may well have been discovered independently in various places, probably by accidentally creating it at the bottom of fires on a clay soil. The earliest known ceramic objects are Gravettian figurines, such as those discovered at Dolní Věstonice in the modern-day Czech Republic. The Venus of Dolní Věstonice is a Venus figurine, a statuette of a nude female figure dated to 29,000–25,000 BC (Gravettian industry). But there is no evidence of pottery vessels from this period. Weights for looms or fishing nets are a very common use for the earliest pottery. Sherds have been found in China and Japan from a period between 12,000 and perhaps as long as 18,000 years ago. As of 2012, the earliest pottery vessels found anywhere in the world, dating to 20,000 to 19,000 years before the present, was found at Xianren Cave in the Jiangxi province of China.

Other early pottery vessels include those excavated from the Yuchanyan Cave in southern China, dated from 16,000 BC, and those found in the Amur River basin in the Russian Far East, dated from 14,000 BC.

The Odai Yamamoto I site, belonging to the Jōmon period, currently has the oldest pottery in Japan. Excavations in 1998 uncovered earthenware fragments which have been dated as early as 14,500 BC. The term "Jōmon" means "cord-marked" in Japanese. This refers to the markings made on the vessels and figures using sticks with cords during their production. Recent research has elucidated how Jōmon pottery was used by its creators.

It appears that pottery was independently developed in Sub-Saharan Africa during the 10th millennium BC, with findings dating to at least 9,400 BC from central Mali, and in South America during the 9,000s–7,000s BC. The Malian finds date to the same period as similar finds from East Asia – the triangle between Siberia, China and Japan – and are associated in both regions to the same climatic changes (at the end of the ice age new grassland develops, enabling hunter-gatherers to expand their habitat), met independently by both cultures with similar developments: the creation of pottery for the storage of wild cereals (pearl millet), and that of small arrowheads for hunting small game typical of grassland. Alternatively, the creation of pottery in the case of the Incipient Jōmon civilisation could be due to the intensive exploitation of freshwater and marine organisms by late glacial foragers, who started developing ceramic containers for their catch.

==== East Asia ====
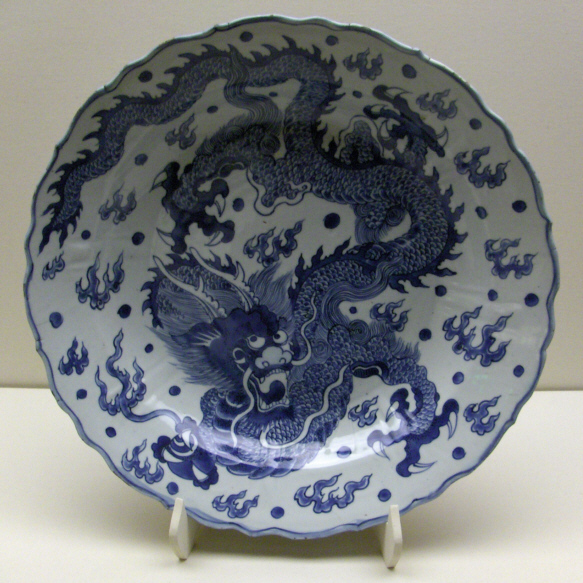
Chinese Ming dynasty blue-and-white porcelain dish with a dragon

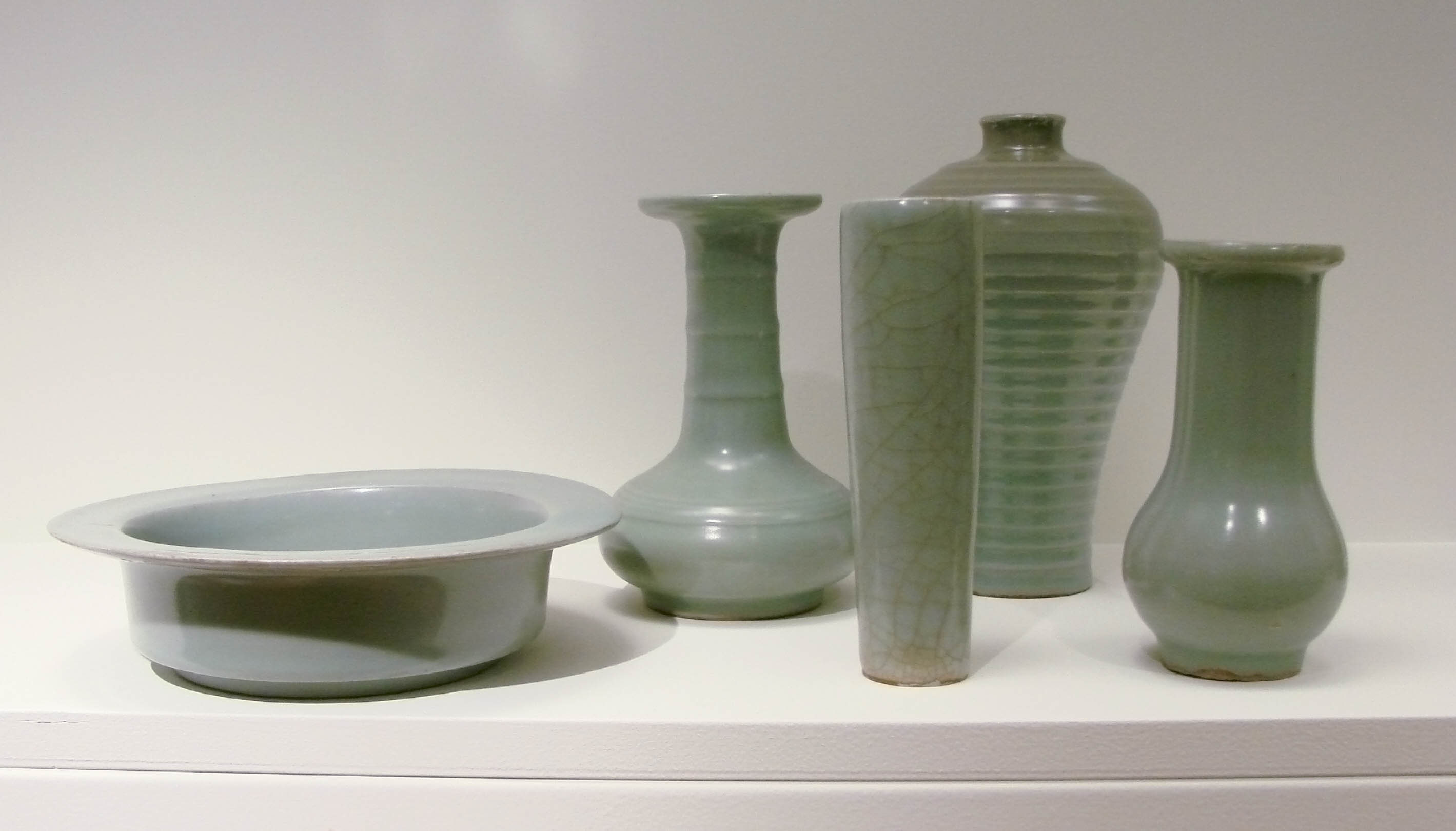
Group of 13th-century pieces of Longquan celadon

In Japan, the Jōmon period is known for the development of Jōmon pottery, characterized by rope impressions on the surface, created by pressing rope into the clay before firing. Glazed stoneware was being created as early as the 15th century BC in China. A form of Chinese porcelain became a significant Chinese export from the Tang dynasty (AD 618–906) onwards. Korean potters adopted porcelain as early as the 14th century AD. The ceramic industry has developed greatly since the Goryeo dynasty, and Goryeo ware, a celadon with unique inlaying techniques, was produced. Later, as white porcelain became more common and celadon declined in popularity, they created distinctive ceramics such as Buncheong. Japan's white porcelain was influenced by potters kidnapped during the Japanese invasions of Korea (1592–1598), known as the Ceramic Wars, and by Japanese engineers, who introduced it during the Fall of the Ming dynasty. Typically, Korean potters who settled in Arita pass on pottery techniques. Shonzui Goradoyu-go brought back the secret of its manufacture from the Chinese kilns at Jingdezhen.

In contrast to Europe, the Chinese social elite used pottery extensively at the table, for religious purposes, and for decoration, and the standards of fine pottery were very high. From the Song dynasty (960–1279) for several centuries, the tastes of Chinese elites favoured plain-coloured and exquisitely formed pieces; during this period, porcelain was perfected in Ding ware, although it was the only one of the Five Great Kilns of the Song period to use it. The traditional Chinese category of high-fired wares includes stoneware types such as Ru ware, Longquan celadon, and Guan ware. Painted wares such as Cizhou ware had a lower status, though they were acceptable for making pillows.

The arrival of Chinese blue and white porcelain was probably a result of the Mongol Yuan dynasty (1271–1368) dispersing artists and artisans throughout its vast empire. Both the cobalt stains used for the blue colour, and the style of painted decoration, usually based on plant shapes, were initially borrowed from the Islamic world, which the Mongols had also conquered. At the same time, Jingdezhen porcelain, produced in Imperial factories, took the undisputed leading role in production. The new, elaborately painted style was now favoured at court, and gradually more colours were added.

The secret of making such porcelain was sought in the Islamic world and later in Europe when examples were imported from the East. Many attempts were made to imitate it in Italy and France. However, it was not produced outside of East Asia until 1709 in Germany.

==== South Asia ====
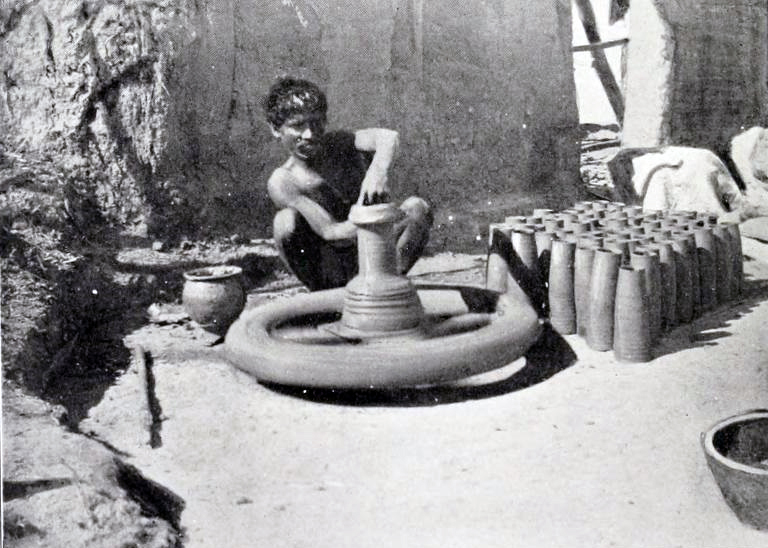
A potter with his pottery wheel, British Raj (1910)

Cord-Impressed style pottery belongs to the "Mesolithic" ceramic tradition that developed among Vindhya hunter-gatherers in Central India during the Mesolithic period. This ceramic style is also found in later Proto-Neolithic phase in nearby regions. This early type of pottery, also found at the site of Lahuradewa, is currently the oldest known pottery tradition in South Asia, dating back to 7,000–6,000 BC. Wheel-made pottery began to be made during the Mehrgarh Period II (5,500–4,800 BC) and Merhgarh Period III (4,800–3,500 BC), known as the ceramic Neolithic and Chalcolithic. Pottery, including items known as the ed-Dur vessels, originated in regions of the Saraswati River / Indus River and has been found in some sites in the Indus Civilization. Despite an extensive prehistoric record of pottery, including painted wares, little "fine" or luxury pottery was made in the subcontinent in historic times. Hinduism discourages eating off pottery, which probably largely accounts for this. Most traditional Indian pottery vessels are large pots or jars for storage, or small cups or lamps, occasionally treated as disposable. In contrast, there are long traditions of terracotta sculpted figures, often rather large; this continues with the Bankura horses in Panchmura, West Bengal.

==== Southeast Asia ====
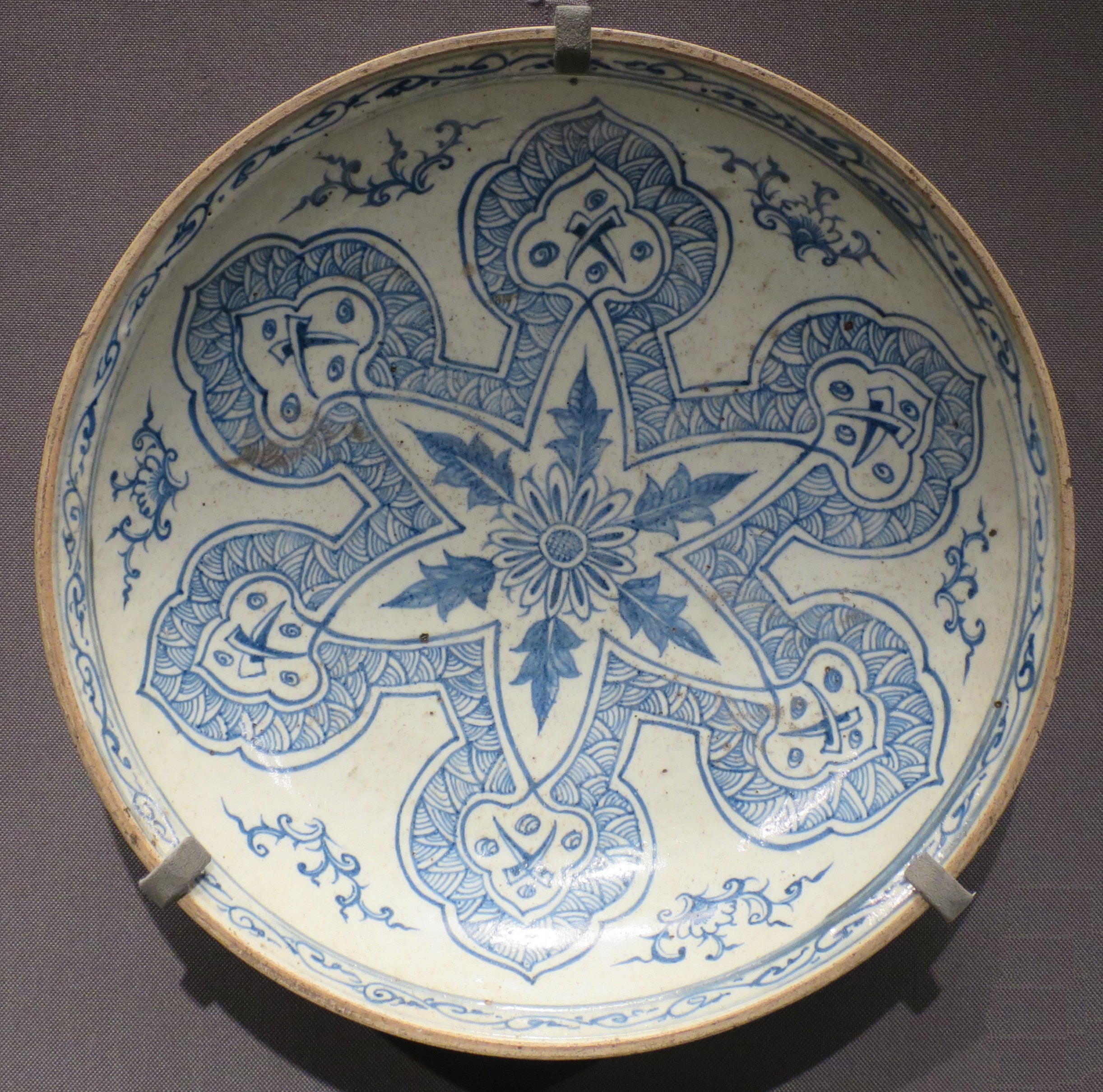
15th-century Vietnamese Chu Dau blue-white porcelain dish with Islamic geometric decorations.

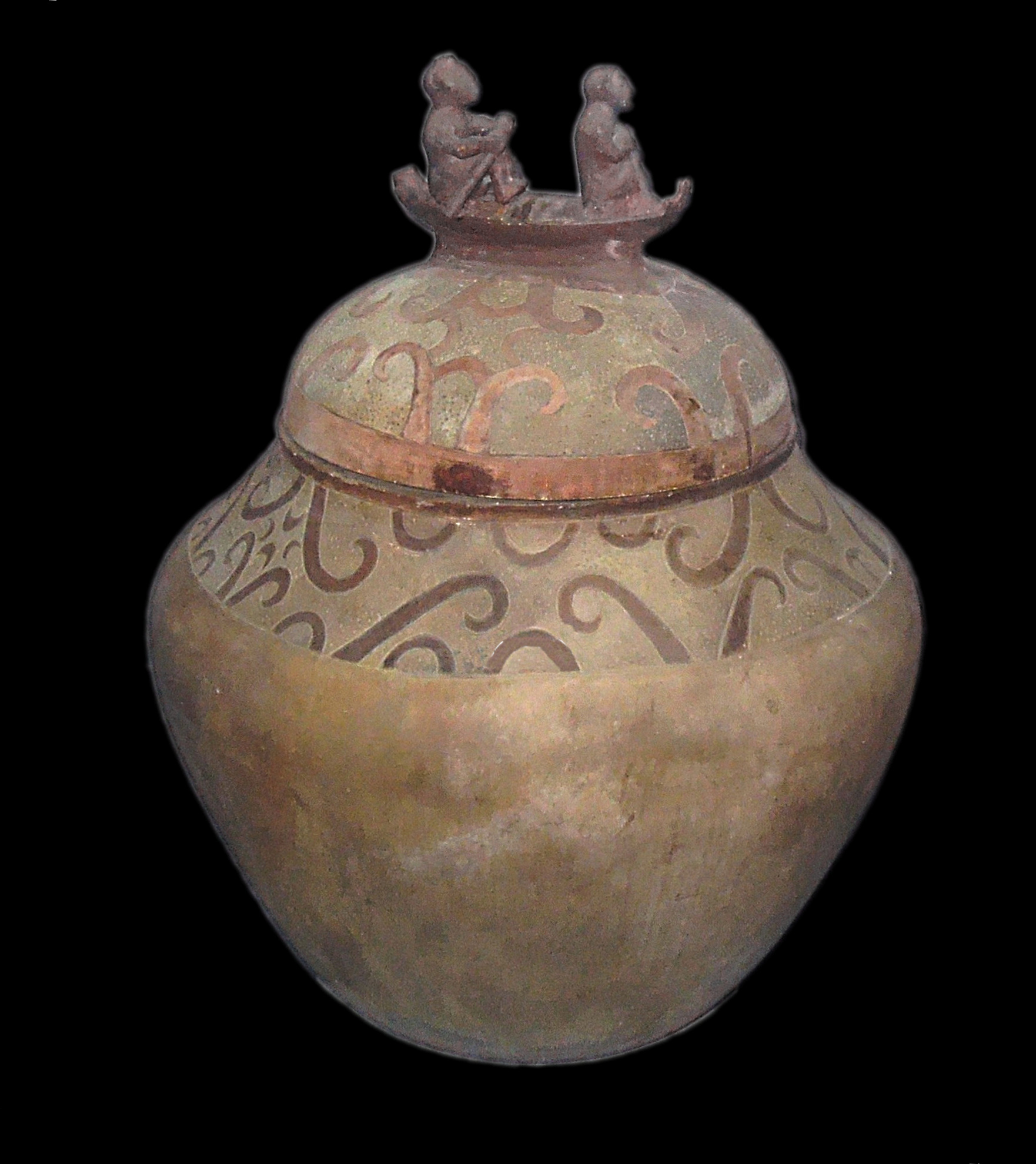
Late Neolithic Manunggul Jar from Palawan used for burial, topped with two figures representing the journey of the soul into the afterlife.

Pottery in Southeast Asia is as diverse as its ethnic groups. Each ethnic group has its own set of standards for pottery. Potteries are made for various purposes, such as trade, food and beverage storage, kitchen use, religious ceremonies, and burial.

==== West Asia ====
Around 8000 BC, during the Pre-pottery Neolithic period, and before the invention of pottery, several early settlements became experts in crafting beautiful and highly sophisticated containers from stone, using materials such as alabaster or granite, and employing sand to shape and polish. Artisans used the material's veins to maximum visual effect. Such objects have been found in abundance on the upper Euphrates river, in what is today eastern Syria, especially at the site of Bouqras.

The earliest history of pottery production in the Fertile Crescent starts with the Pottery Neolithic. It can be divided into four periods, namely: the Hassuna period (7000–6500 BC), the Halaf period (6500–5500 BC), the Ubaid period (5500–4000 BC), and the Uruk period (4000–3100 BC). By about 5000 BC, pottery-making was becoming widespread across the region and spreading to neighbouring areas.

Pottery making began in the 7th millennium BC. The earliest forms, found at the Hassuna site, were hand-formed from slabs into undecorated, unglazed, low-fired pots made from reddish-brown clays. Within the next millennium, wares were decorated with elaborate painted designs and natural forms, incising and burnished.

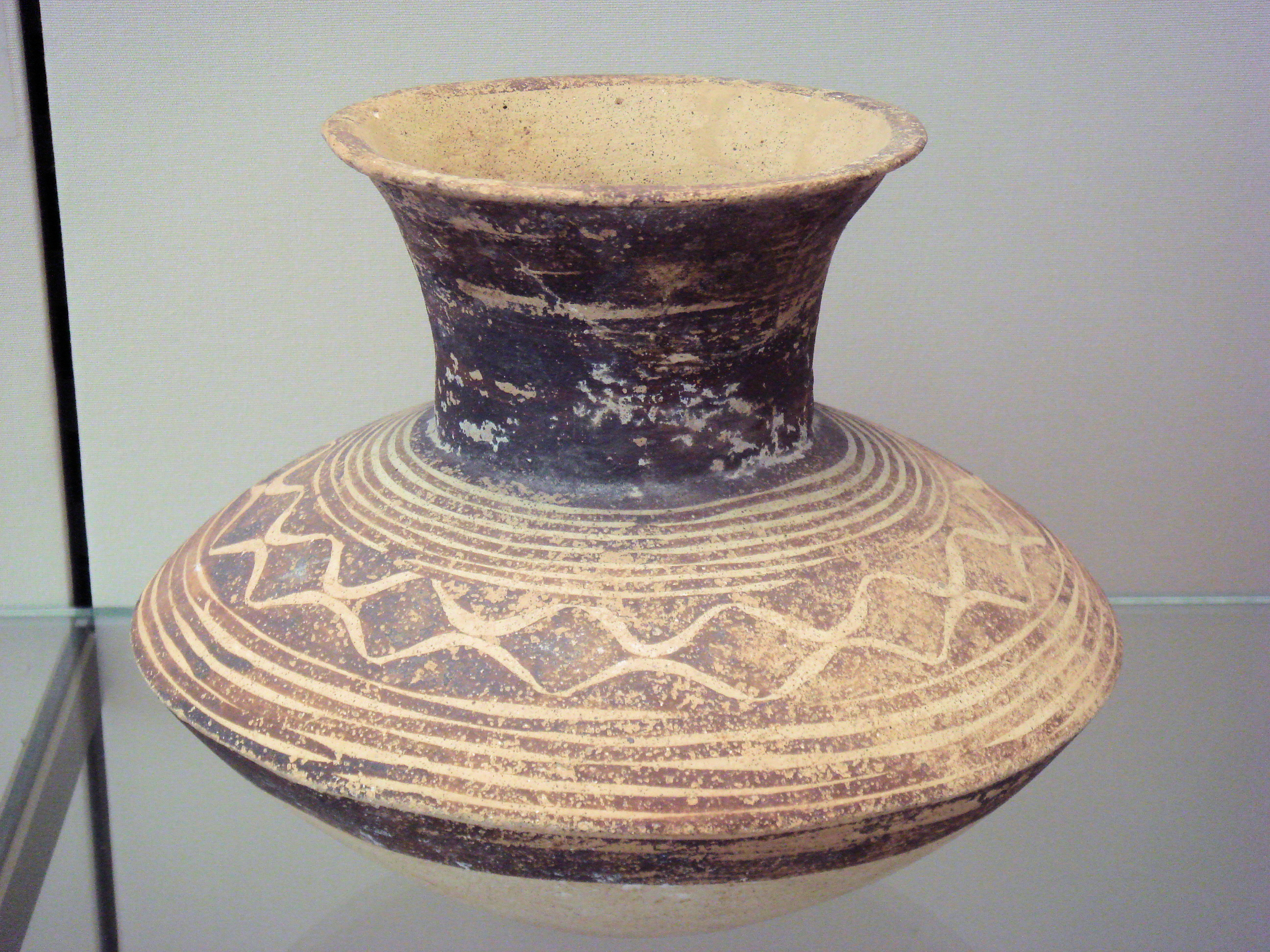
Earthenware Ubaid jar. c. 5,300–4,700 BCE.

The invention of the potter's wheel in Mesopotamia sometime between 6,000 and 4,000 BC (Ubaid period) revolutionised pottery production. Newer kiln designs could fire wares to 1,050 °C (1,920 °F) to 1,200 °C (2,190 °F), enabling greater possibilities. Small groups of potters now carried out production for small cities, rather than individuals making wares for a family. The shapes and uses of ceramics and pottery expanded beyond simple vessels for storing and carrying to include specialized cooking utensils, pot stands, and rat traps. As the region developed new organizations and political forms, pottery became more elaborate and varied. Some wares were made using moulds, allowing for increased production to meet the needs of growing populations. Glazing was commonly used, and pottery was more decorated.

In the Chalcolithic period in Mesopotamia, Halafian pottery achieved a level of technical competence and sophistication, not seen until the later developments of Greek pottery with Corinthian and Attic ware.

==== Europe ====
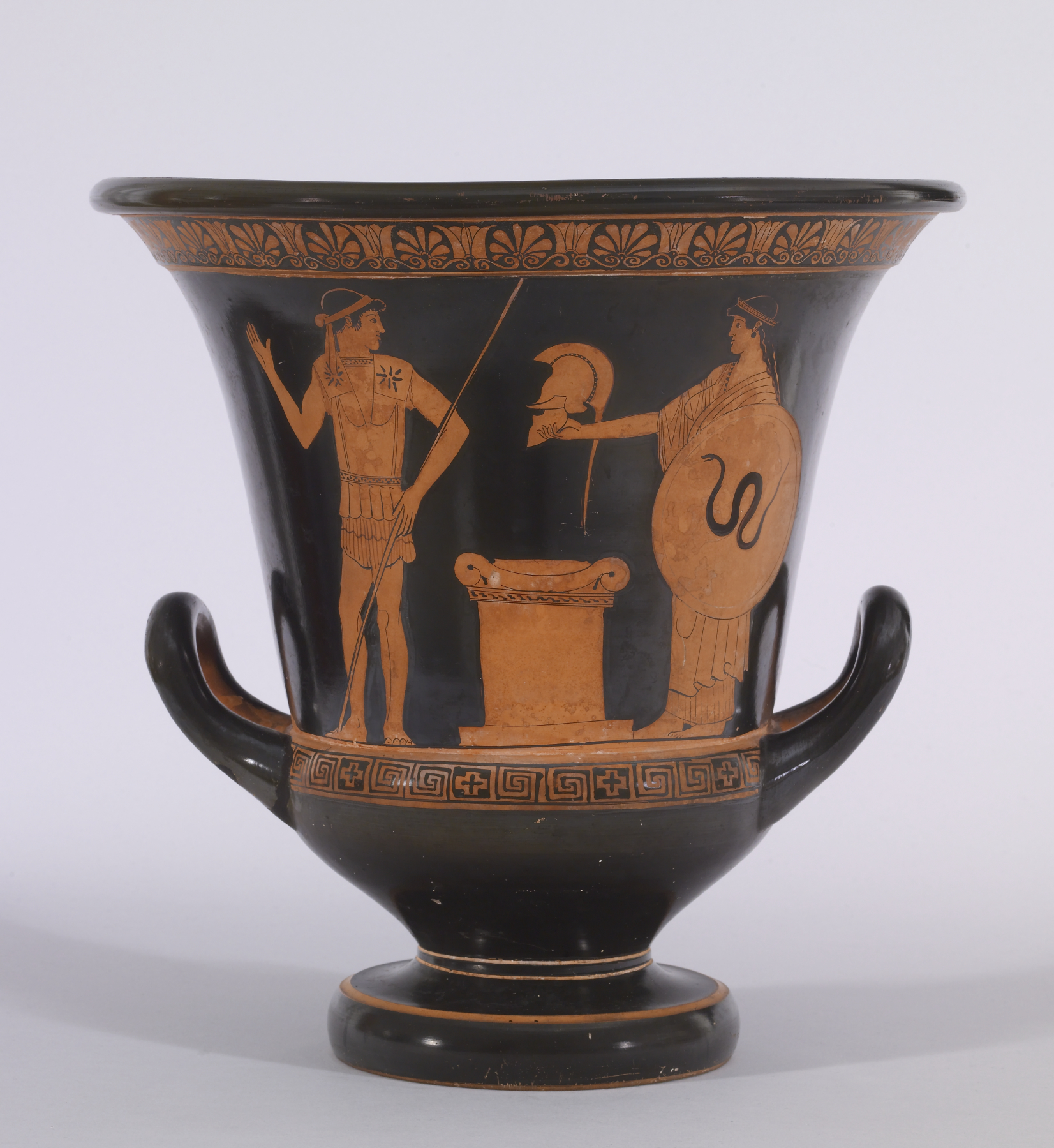
Greek red-figure vase in the krater shape, between 470 and 460 BC, by the Altamura Painter

Europe's oldest pottery, dating from circa 6700 BC, was found on the banks of the Samara River in the middle Volga region of Russia. These sites are known as the Yelshanka culture.

The early inhabitants of Europe developed pottery in the Linear Pottery culture slightly later than the Near East, circa 5500–4500 BC. In the ancient Western Mediterranean, elaborately painted earthenware reached very high levels of artistic achievement in the Greek world; numerous survivals from tombs remain. Minoan pottery was characterized by complex painted decoration with natural themes. Classical Greek culture began to emerge around 1000 BC, featuring a variety of well-crafted pottery that now included the human form as a decorative motif. The pottery wheel was now in regular use. Although glazing was known to these potters, it was not widely used. Instead, a more porous clay slip was used for decoration. A wide range of shapes for different uses developed early and remained essentially unchanged during Greek history.

Fine Etruscan pottery was heavily influenced by Greek pottery and often imported Greek potters and painters. Ancient Roman pottery made much less use of painting but relied on moulded decoration, enabling industrial-scale production. Much of the so-called red Samian ware of the Early Roman Empire was produced in modern Germany and France, where entrepreneurs established large potteries. Excavations at Augusta Raurica, near Basel, Switzerland, have revealed a pottery production site in use from the 1st to the 4th century AD.

Pottery was hardly seen on the tables of elites from Hellenistic times until the Renaissance, and most medieval wares were coarse and utilitarian, as the elites ate off metal vessels. Painted Hispano-Moresque ware from Spain, developing the styles of Al-Andalus, became a luxury for late medieval elites, and was adapted in Italy into maiolica in the Italian Renaissance. Both of these were faience or tin-glazed earthenware, and fine faience continued to be made until around 1800 in various countries, especially France, with Nevers faience and several other centres. In the 17th century, imports of Chinese export porcelain and its Japanese equivalent raised the market expectations of fine pottery, and European manufacturers eventually learned to make porcelain, often in the form of soft-paste porcelain. From the 18th century onward, European porcelain and other wares from many producers became extremely popular, reducing Asian imports.

==== United Kingdom ====
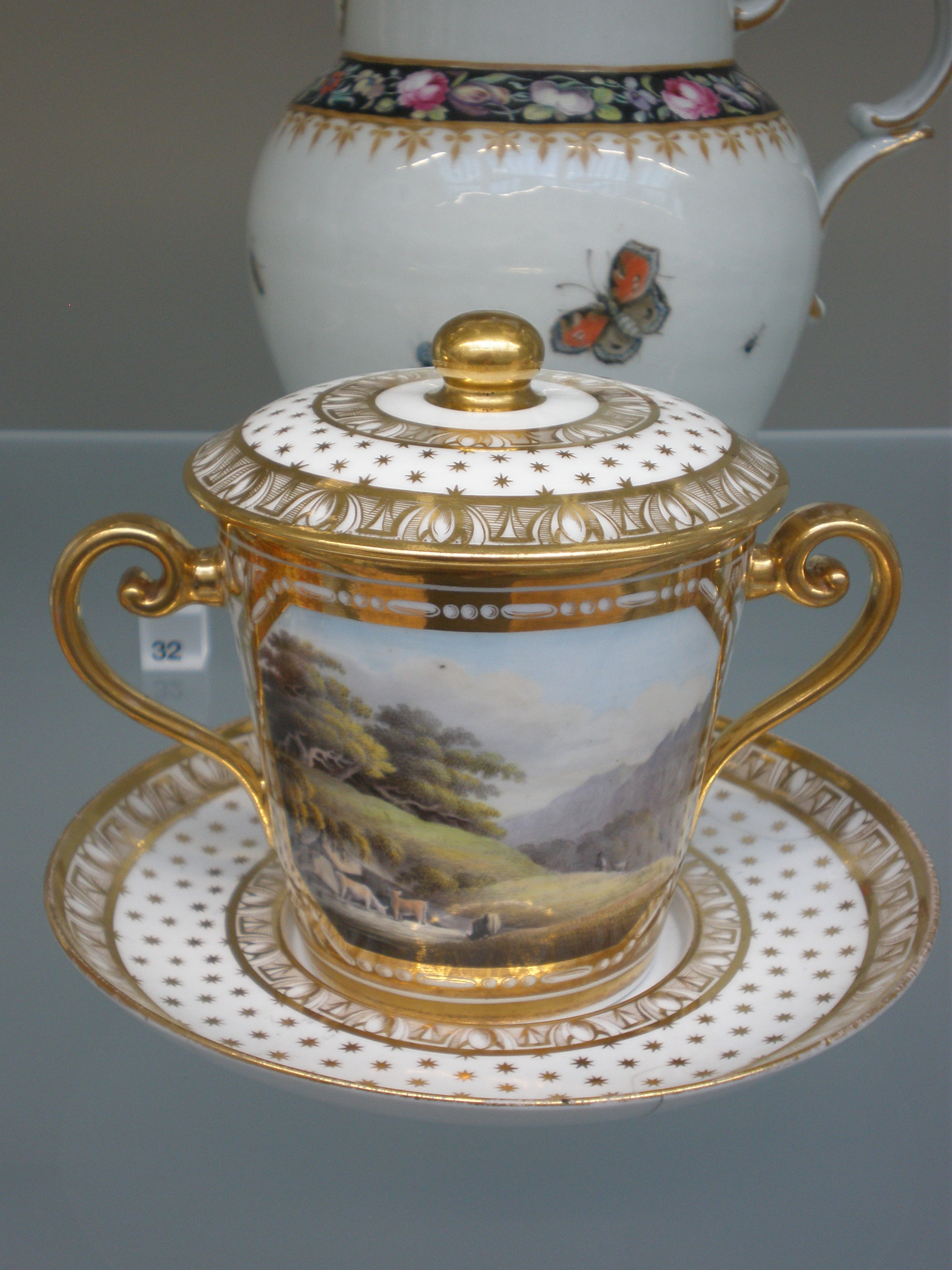
Handpainted bone china cup. England, 1815–1820

The city of Stoke-on-Trent is widely known as "The Potteries" because of the large number of pottery factories or, colloquially, "Pot Banks". It was one of the first industrial cities of the modern era, where, as early as 1785, 200 pottery manufacturers employed 20,000 workers. Josiah Wedgwood (1730–1795) was the dominant leader.

In North Staffordshire, hundreds of companies produced all kinds of pottery, from tablewares and decorative pieces to industrial items. The main pottery types of earthenware, stoneware, and porcelain were all made in large quantities. The Staffordshire industry was a major innovator in developing new varieties of ceramic bodies, such as bone china and jasperware, and in pioneering transfer printing and other glazing and decorating techniques. In general, Staffordshire was strongest in the middle and lower price ranges, though it also produced the finest and most expensive wares.

By the late 18th century, North Staffordshire was the largest producer of ceramics in the UK, despite significant hubs elsewhere. Large export markets took Staffordshire pottery around the world, especially in the 19th century. Production had begun to decline in the late 19th century, as other countries developed their industries, and declined notably after World War II. Employment fell from 45,000 in 1975 to 23,000 in 1991 and to 13,000 in 2002.

==== Arabic pottery ====
Early Islamic pottery followed the forms of the regions which the Arabs conquered. Eventually, however, there was cross-fertilization between the regions. This was most notable in the Chinese influences on Islamic pottery. Trade between China and the Islamic world occurred through a network of trading posts along the lengthy Silk Road. Middle Eastern nations imported stoneware and later porcelain from China. China imported the minerals for Cobalt blue from the Islamic-ruled Persia to decorate their blue and white porcelain, which they then exported to the Islamic world.

Likewise, Arabic art contributed to a lasting pottery form identified as Hispano-Moresque in Andalucia. Unique Islamic forms were also developed, including fritware, lusterware, and specialized glazes such as tin-glazing, which led to the emergence of the popular maiolica.

One major emphasis in ceramic development in the Muslim world was the use of tile and decorative tilework.

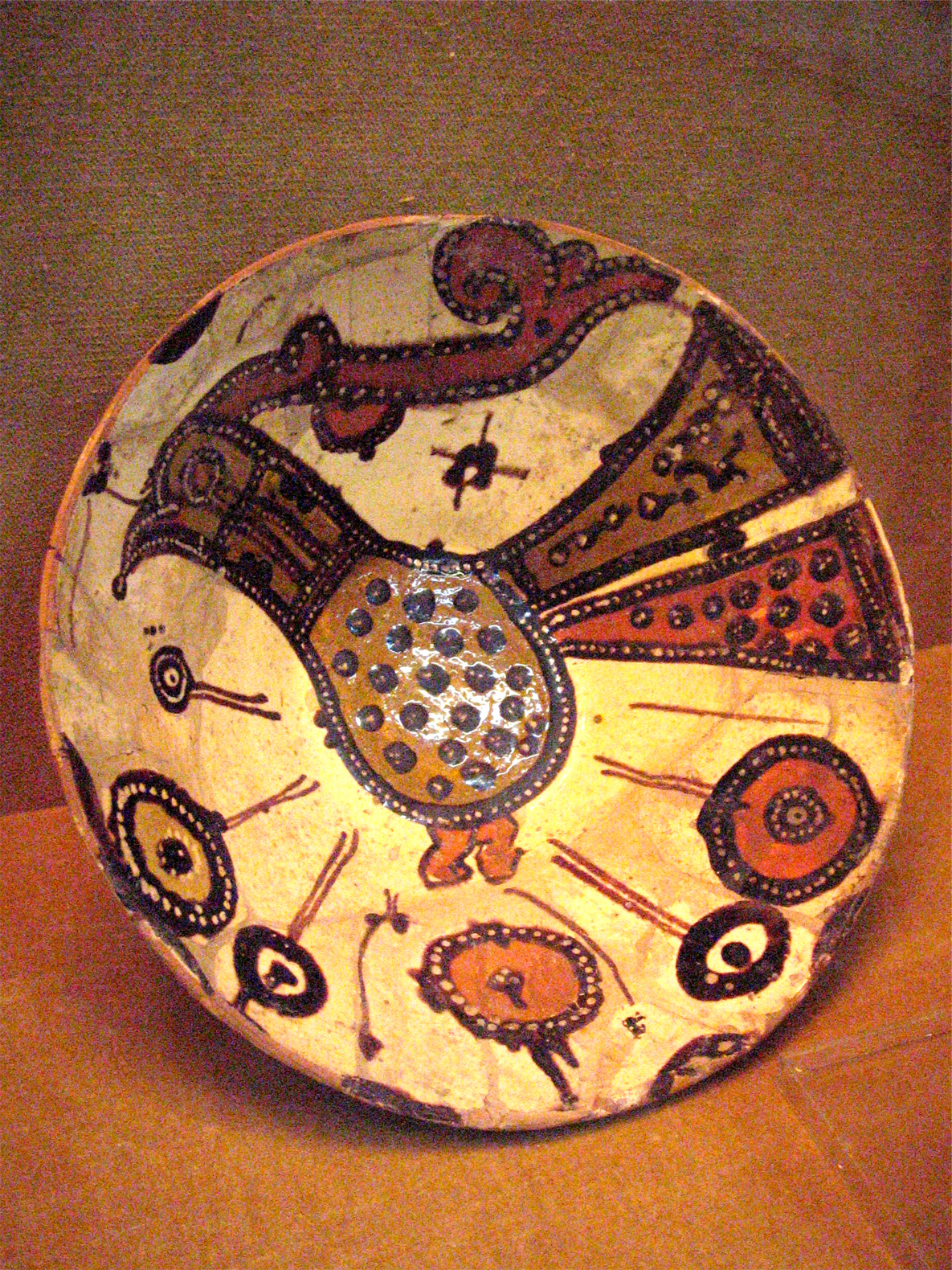
Bowl painted on slip under transparent glaze (polychrome), 9th or 10th century, Nishapur. National Museum of Iran

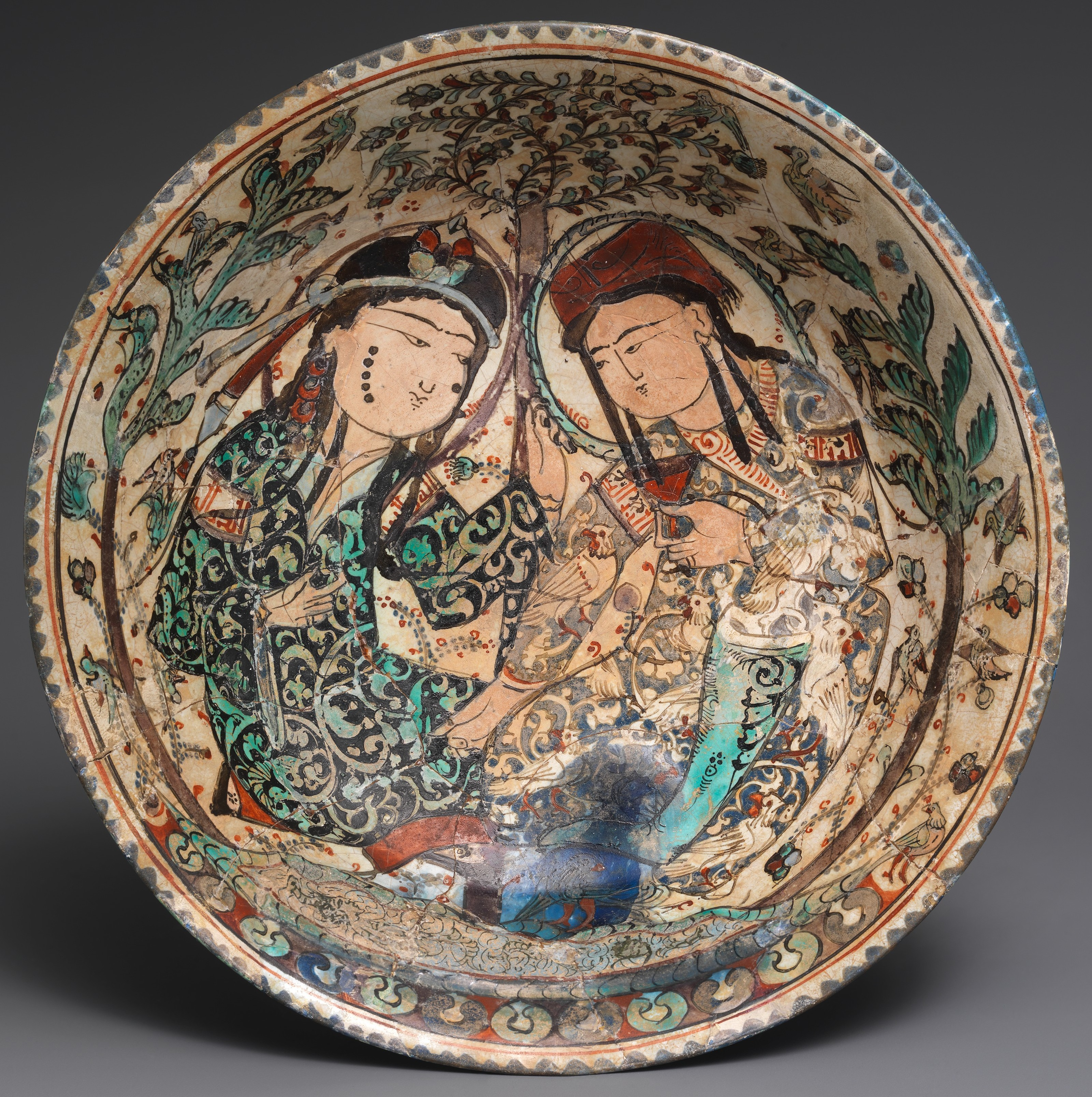
Persian mina'i ware bowl with couple in a garden, around 1200. These wares are the first to use overglaze enamel decoration.

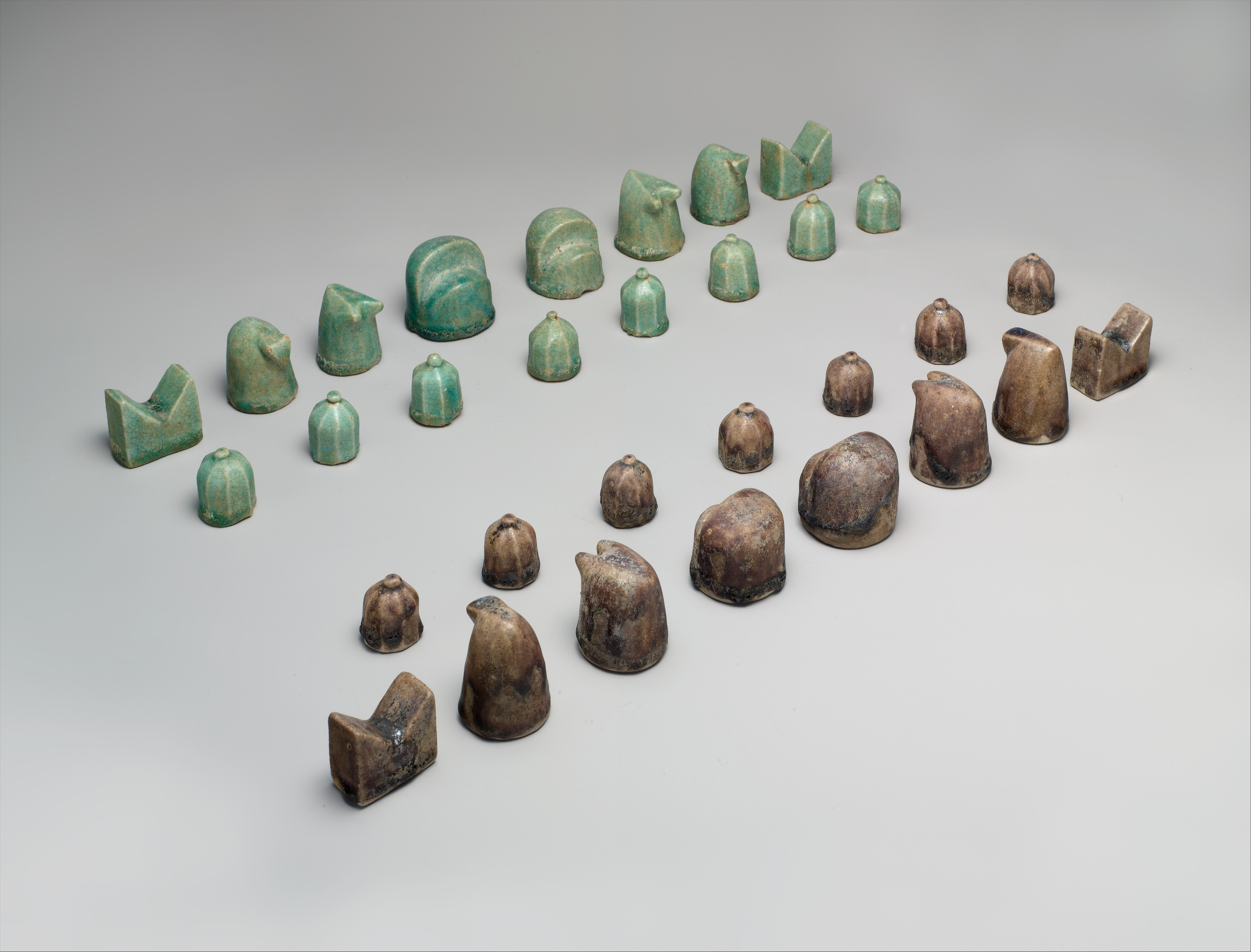
Chess set (Shatrang); Gaming pieces. 12th century, Nishapur glazed fritware. Metropolitan Museum of Art

==== Americas ====
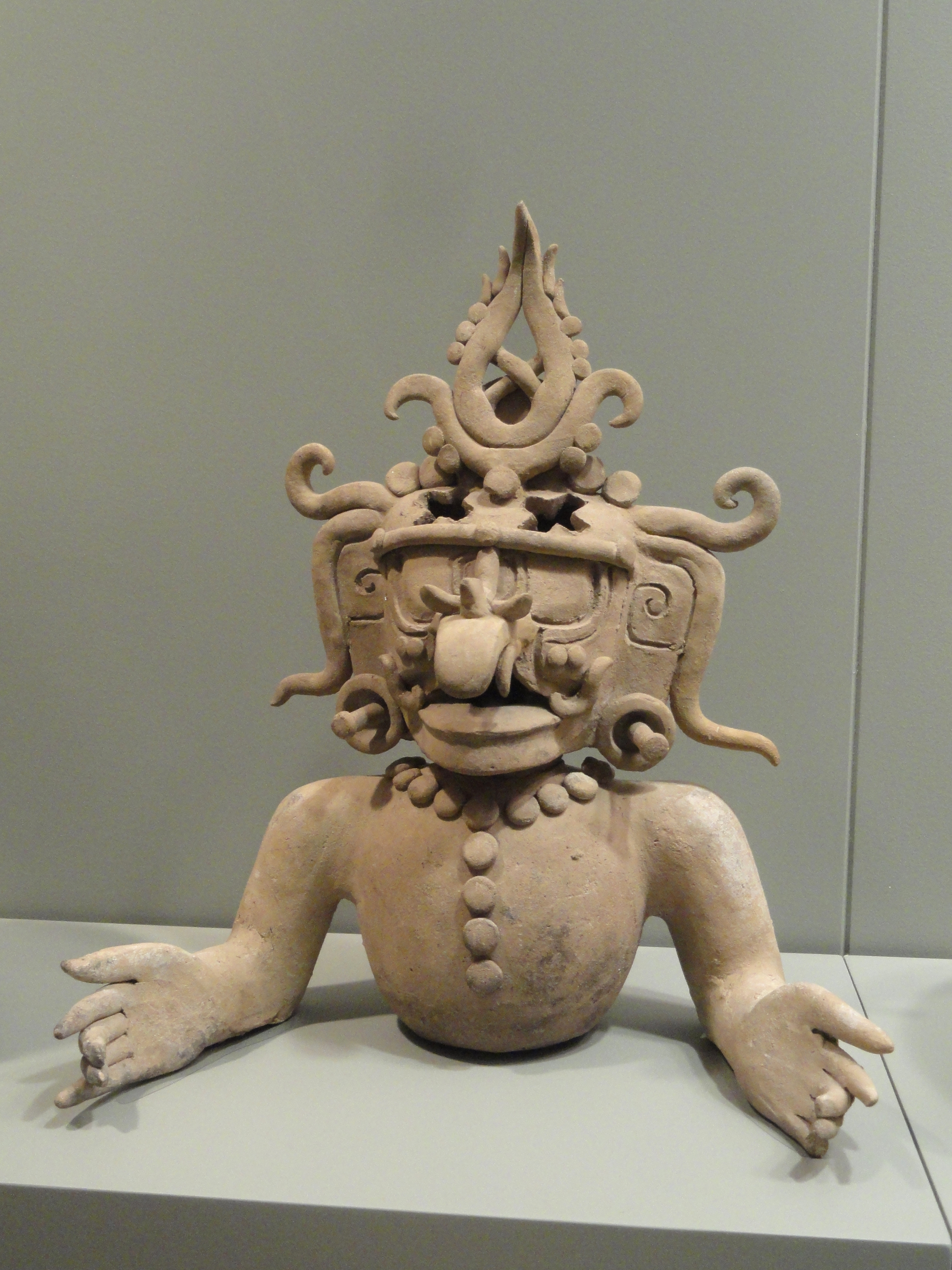
Earthenware effigy of the Sun God. Maya culture, 500–700 CE

Most evidence points to an independent development of pottery in Native American cultures, with the earliest known dates in Brazil ranging from 9,500 to 5,000 years ago and from 7,000 to 6,000 years ago. Further north in Mesoamerica, dates begin with the Archaic Era (3500–2000 BC), and into the Formative period (2000 BC – AD 200). These cultures did not develop the stoneware, porcelain, or glazes found in the Old World. Maya ceramics include finely painted vessels, usually beakers, with elaborate scenes with several figures and texts. Several cultures, beginning with the Olmec, made terracotta sculpture, and sculptural pieces depicting humans or animals that also serve as vessels are produced in many places, with Moche portrait vessels among the finest.

==== Africa ====
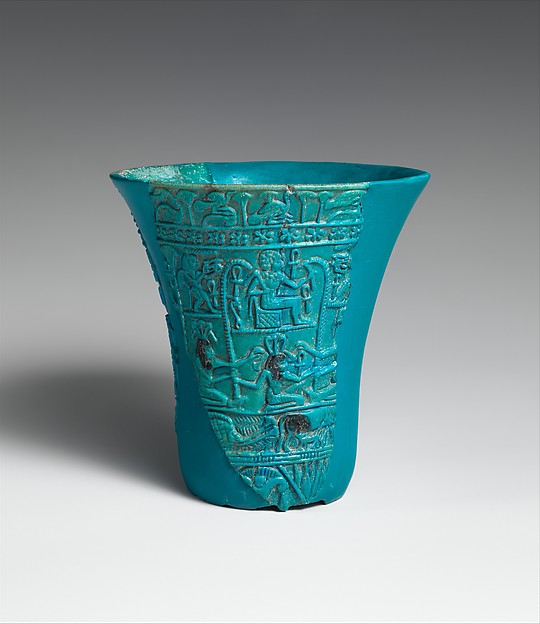
Faience lotiform chalice. Egypt 1070–664 BCE (reconstructed from eight fragments)

The oldest pottery in the world outside of East Asia can be found in Africa. In 2007, Swiss archaeologists discovered pieces of some of the oldest pottery in Africa at Ounjougou in the central region of Mali, dating to at least 9,400 BC. Excavations in the Bosumpra Cave on the Kwahu Plateau in southeastern Ghana, have revealed well-manufactured pottery using a variety of surface decoration techniques dating from the early tenth millennium cal. BC. Following the emergence of pottery traditions in the Ounjougou region of Mali around 11,900 BP and in the Bosumpra region of Ghana soon after, ceramics later arrived in the Iho Eleru region of Nigeria. In later periods, a relationship of the introduction of pot-making in some parts of Sub-Saharan Africa with the spread of Bantu languages has been long recognized, although the details remain controversial and awaiting further research, and no consensus has been reached.

Use of pottery was then found in the Bir Kiseiba region, with a surplus of pottery shards dated roughly 9,300 BC. Archaeological digs around Sub-Saharan Africa have continued to bring more history of ceramic use to light, including pottery shards found in Ravin de la Mouche, which were carbon-dated to roughly 7,500 BC. After 8,000 BC, the prevalence of ceramics in Sub-Saharan Africa surged, becoming a continent-wide phenomenon.

==== Oceania ====
Pottery has been found at archaeological sites across the islands of Oceania and is attributed to an ancient culture known as the Lapita. Another form of pottery, called Plainware, is found at sites throughout Oceania. The relationship between Lapita pottery and Plainware is not altogether clear. The need for pottery eventually diminished with the settlement of islands farther east into Polynesia, as people there adapted to cooking with earth ovens.

The Indigenous Australians never developed pottery. After Europeans came to Australia and settled, they found deposits of clay which were analysed by English potters as excellent for making pottery. Less than 20 years later, Europeans arrived in Australia and began making pottery. Since then, ceramic manufacturing, mass-produced pottery, and studio pottery have flourished in Australia.

== See also ==
- List of classifications of pottery
- Potter's wheel
- Glossary of pottery terms
- History of ceramic art
- Delftware
- Faience
- Majolica
