= Glossary of pottery terms =

This is a list of pottery and ceramic terms.

Definitions in Wiktionary are noted as "(W)".

== A ==
Absorbency
The ability of a material to soak up water.
Alumina
A major component of the chemical composition of clays, clay bodies and most glazes.
Ark
Large tank for the storage of slip. To prevent sedimentation it is gently agitated by slowly rotating blades.
Atmosphere
The gaseous environment within the kiln during the firing process. Can be oxidising (an excess of oxygen) or reducing (a deficiency of oxygen). Influences the fired colour of bodies and glazes.

== B ==
Backstamp
A small mark applied to the underside, the back, of articles to give information such as the identity of maker. Various techniques to apply the stamp exist.
Ball clay
A secondary clay. Ball clays invariably also contain various non-clay minerals, and sometimes organic matter. They commonly exhibit high plasticity and high dry strength.(W)
Ball mill
A cylindrical grinder used to grind, or mill, raw materials for use in ceramic bodies or glazes. Size reduction of the feed materials is achieved by a combination of impact and attrition resulting from the tumbling of hard media, such as pebbles, inside the mill during the rotation of the mill. Ceramic raw materials which are commonly milled include quartz, feldspar and calcined alumina. Ball mills can also be used to mix ceramic bodies.
Band
Lines marked around circular ceramic utensils (such as plates, jars or lids) using any method of decoration which can be applied at all stages of manufacture. Banding is the action of marking a band.
Batt
Less commonly also known as a "batterboard", thin slab of wood, plaster or plastic used to support ware during shaping. Also, a flat piece of kiln furniture on which ware is placed in a kiln.
Batt wash
A thin refractory coating, often calcined alumina, applied in slurry form to batts. Used to reduce the adherence of ware during firing. Also called kiln wash.
Bentonite
An extremely plastic clay rich in montmorillonite which can be added in small quantities to clays or clay bodies to increase plasticity.
Biscuit
Pottery that has been fired but not yet glazed. Occasionally also bisque.(W)
Bisque porcelain
Unglazed porcelain as a final product, with a matt surface resembling marble.
Biscuit firing
The first firing prior to glazing and subsequent additional firing.
Bloating
The permanent swelling of a ceramic article during firing caused by the evolution of gases.
Blunging
The energetic mixing of ceramic raw materials, especially clays, with water to produce slip or slurry. Undertaken in large tanks called blungers.
Body
The structural portion of a ceramic article, or the material or mixture from which it is made.
Bone ash
Calcined animal bone used in the production of bone china. Synthetic alternatives are available.
(W)
Bone china
Vitreous, translucent pottery made from a body of the following approximate composition: 45-50% calcined bone, 20-25% kaolin & 25-30% china stone.
(W)
Bone-dry
The final stage of greenware dried to a near or fully dry state and ready to be fired. In this state, the article is very fragile, non-plastic and porous.
Brongniart's formula
A mathematical formula developed by Alexandre Brongniart of Sèvres Porcelain which is used to determine the dry material content suspended in a clay or glaze slip.
Bullers ring
A type of pyrometric device. Is measured using a Bullers ring gauge.

== C ==
Calcine
To heat a material such that certain temperature dependant changes occur, examples being oxididation, reduction, phase changes or the loss of chemically-bound water. Ceramic raw materials which are calcined include clay, bone and talc.
Candling
The lower temperature stage of some firing cycles used to complete the drying of the ware.
Carbonizing
The permanent staining of a ceramic material by the introduction of carbon particles during firing.
Casting
slip casting
Celadon
A glaze originating from China containing iron which produce green, grey and grey-blue colours in reduction firing.
Ceramic
An inorganic, crystalline non-metallic solid formulated from metal or non-metal compounds whose irreversible formation occurred during heating to high temperatures.
Chamotte
A ceramic material formed by the high temperature firing of a refractory clay, after which it is crushed (and sometimes then milled) before being graded to size. Used as the a non-plastic component of some clay bodies. Grog is a similar material.(W)
Chattering
Making stylistic repeated markings on the side of the clay body by bouncing a trimming or other tool against the edge of the pot while spinning. The resulting repeated marking patterns can be controlled by the tool's applied force and the wheel's speed.
Chemical porcelain
A type of porcelain characterised by low thermal expansion, high mechanical strength and high chemical resistance. Used for laboratory ware, such as evaporating dishes and reaction vessels.
China clay
Synonym for kaolin: a raw material for many types of clay body, and is the main clay for porcelain.
China stone
A pottery stone that was formerly mined in Cornwall in the UK. Traditionally was used at around 25% in bone china bodies. Also known as Cornish stone.
Clay
A group of hydrous aluminium phyllosilicate minerals. Often also used to refer to the clay body, which sometimes may only contain small amounts of clay minerals. (W)
Clay body
The material used to form an article of pottery. Thus a potter might prepare, or order from a supplier, such an amount of earthenware body, stoneware body or porcelain body.
Coiling (pottery)
A hand method of forming pottery by building up the walls with coils of rope-like rolls of clay.
Cone
See pyrometric cone
Crackle glaze
A glaze intentionally crazed (minute cracks) for decorative effect.
Crawling
A parting and contraction of the glaze on the surface of ceramic ware during drying or firing, resulting in unglazed areas bordered by coalesced glaze. May be caused by uneven glazing, excessive glaze thickness or a greasy substrate. (W)
Crazing
A glaze fault characterised by the cracking of fired glazes and due to high tensile stresses. Can also be caused by the moisture expansion of porous bodies. (W)
Crock
synonym of pot. (W)
Crocker
synonym of a potter, one who creates pottery (archaic). (W)
Crockery
synonym of pottery. (W)
Crystalline glaze
Glazes characterised by crystalline clusters of various shapes and colours embedded in a more uniform and opaque glaze. Produced by the slow cooling of the glost fire.

== D ==
Deairing
The removal of entrapped air from a clay, clay body or slurry, often by the application of a vacuum. (W)
Deflocculate
To separate agglomerates in a slurry by the addition of small amounts of particular chemicals, and so decrease viscosity. Examples include sodium carbonate and sodium silicate.(W)
Delftware
A light-coloured pottery body covered with a tin glaze with overglaze decorations in cobalt on the unfired glaze. Developed in Holland to imitate Chinese blue and white porcelain.
Devitrify
When a glaze recrystallise during the cooling stage of firing. Results in a fault unless the intention is the formation of a crystalline glaze.
Dipping
Glazing pottery by immersion in a glaze suspension.
Dribbler
A teapot from which tea does not pour well, rather it dribbles, due to inferior design.
Dunt
A crack caused by thermal shock, especially if ware cooled too rapidly after it has been fired. (W)

== E ==
Earthenware
Porous pottery fired at comparatively low temperatures. Compositions vary considerably, and include both prepared and 'as dug'; the former being by far the dominant type for studio and industry. Always oxidation fired. Fired colours range from white to red, depending on the raw materials. (W)
Electrical porcelain
A type of porcelain which is used for electrical insulators. Is characterised by high plasticity and green strength when unfired, and high mechanical strength and high dielectric strength when fired.
Enamel
(W) Coloured, glass-like decoration applied to ceramic wares. Also called on-glaze decoration. Often made by mixing metal oxides with a flux. Enamels are usually fired to temperatures in the range of about 700 to 800 °C.
Eutectic
An invariant point on an equilibrium diagram. A mixture of two substances which has the lowest melting point in the whole series of possible compositions. (W)
Engobe
A slip coating applied to a ceramic body for imparting colour, opacity or other characteristics. Sometimes distinguished from slip by the addition of non-clay materials, and sometimes not. It may subsequently be covered with a glaze. (W)

== F ==
Faience
A type of tin-glazed earthenware (W)
Fat clay
Clay exhibiting high plasticity.
Feldspar
A group of alumino-silicate minerals. After crushing and grinding to give very fine particles are commonly used as fluxes in bodies and glazes.
Fettling
The removal, in the unfired state of excess body left in the shaping of pottery-ware at such places as seams and edges. (W)
Filler
A non-plastic material used in clay bodies to attenuate drying shrinkage. Finely milled quartz is a common filler.
Filter press
A piece of equipment used to separate liquid and solid from an aqueous suspension: a slurry, or slip, is pumped into the filter press and is dewatered via semi-permeable cloths whilst under fluid pressure. In pottery these are used to produce plastic clay body from a slip. Invariably the output from a press, called filter cakes, are then fed into pugs for de-airing and extrusion.
Fine Fireclay
A semi-vitreous ceramic used for very large pieces of sanitaryware. Despite the name most formulations do not use fireclay, but all use some chamotte. Sometimes abbreviated to FFC.
Fire clay
A highly heat resistant form of clay which can be combined with other clays to increase the firing temperature.
Firing
The process of heating pottery in a kiln to bring the glaze or clay body to maturity.
Flambé
A deep red glaze with characteristic flame-like streaks of other colours. Produced by reduction firing of copper-rich glazes.
Flatware
(W) Plates and dishes, as opposed to holloware vessels such as cups and jugs
Flint
Calcined flint, crushed then ground to fine particle size. A raw material in various ceramic bodies, used as a filler to attenuate drying shrinkage but it also modifies the fired thermal expansion. Traditionally used in the UK, but has largely been replaced by quartz.
Flocculate
The opposite of deflocculate. Calcium chloride is a common flocculant used for glazes.
Fluidity
The degree of flow of liquids, such as slips or glaze suspensions. The inverse of viscosity.
Flux
A material with a comparatively low melting point, and used to promote fusion in a given mixture of raw materials. Examples used in ceramics bodies and glazes include feldspar and nepheline syenite.
Frit
A product made by quenching and breaking up a glass of a specific composition. Common uses include as components of a glaze or enamel, or for the body of fritware, when it usually mixed with larger quantities of quartz sand. (W)
Fusion
A process in which the joining surfaces of clay and glaze interact during firing ending in a thin combined layer of the two. (W)

== G ==
Potter's gauge
A measuring tool used to ensure that thrown pots are of uniform size or shape.
Glaze
A coating that has been matured to the glassy state on a formed ceramic article, or the material or mixture from which the coating is made. Often consists of a flux, silica and colorant(W)
Glaze fit
How well the respective thermal expansions of a ceramic body and fired glaze match. A good fit is critical to avoid some glaze defects.
Glost firing
A firing in a kiln to convert the unfired glaze surface to a glassy surface coating. Also called glaze firing.
Greenware
Unfired clay articles(W)
Grog
See chamotte, above. (W)
Gum arabic
A natural gum used as a binder to enable the glaze to increase the adherence to the body. Also, small percentages can be added to bodies with low green strength, such as bone china, to increase their strength prior to firing.

== H ==
Hard-paste porcelain
Porcelain which had been fired up to 1400°C in a reducing atmosphere. Also called reduction porcelain.
Hollowware
(W) Vessels of any shape, as opposed to flatware such as plates

== I ==
Iron oxide
A common oxide in glazes and some clays. The fired colour depends on a number of factors, such as concentration and firing atmosphere.

== J ==
Jigger
A machine for the shaping of clay body into flatware by the differential rotation of a profile tool and mould. Also the process. (W)
Jolley
Similar to jigger except to shape hollowware. Also the process. (W)

== K ==
Kaolin
White or off-white firing kaolinitic clay, although rocks consisting of other kaolinite group minerals may also be called kaolin. Can be either of primary or secondary deposits. A key raw material for many pottery bodies. Also known as China clay.(W)
Kidney
A kidney-shaped tool made of flexible steel for finishing thrown pots, or made of stiff rubber for pressing and smoothing clay in a mould.
Kiln
A furnace for the firing of ceramics.
Kiln furniture
Refractory ceramic articles used to support ware during firing.
Kiln spurs
Supports, often in the shape of a tripod, used to maintain the shape and separate ware during the firing process. Made of refractory ceramic material.
Kneading
Preparing clay for shaping which involves manipulating the clay by hand in a fashion somewhat like kneading dough for bread. It ensures the even distribution of moisture in the body.

== L ==
Lawn
Another name for sieve.
Leather-hard
The condition of a clay or clay body when it has been partially dried to the point where all shrinkage has stopped. (W)
Loss of Ignition
The percentage of mass lost when a material is heated under specified conditions: 1,000 °C is common for ceramic raw materials
Lustre
A type of decoration originally developed in Persia which leaves a thin layer of metal on the decorated portions of pottery. Has an iridescent appearance. Similar to using gold leaf, it comes as a liquid and is a third firing completed after glaze. Common varieties are Pearl, Copper, Gold, Silver, and Platinum.
Luting
A method of joining together two pieces of dry or leather-hard clay with a slip.

== M ==
Magnesia porcelain
A type of porcelain, the raw materials of which contain a significant amount of talc, a magnesium silicate mineral. After firing it is characterised by low thermal expansion and high mechanical strength.
Maiolica
or majolica (W) Earthenware developed in Majorca, Spain and Italy which is tin-glazed and overpainted with oxides. Similar pottery is known in France as Faience and in UK and Netherlands as Deftware.
Majolica
(W) or maiolica Earthenware developed in France and England, which is made by applying temperature compatible coloured lead glazes simultaneously to the biscuit body, then firing.
Matte glaze
A dull-surfaced glaze with no gloss. Can also be achieved by sand blasting.
Maturing temperature
The temperature at which a body, and glaze, exhibits it required characteristics.
Maturity
The combined effects of firing time and firing temperature on ceramic wares in a kiln. Within limits, wares fired at low temperatures for extended periods may develop a degree of maturity similar to that achieved by applying higher firing temperatures for shorter periods. (W)
Metal release
The leaching of heavy metals, such as cadmium and lead, from a glaze: this can present a hazard to health. Can be eliminated or reduced to a safe level by the use of suitable glaze formulations and processing. Testing is commonly undertaken by reputable manufacturers to ensure ware meets nationally and internationally specified limits.
Modulus of Rupture
The maximum transverse breaking stress, or bending load, applied under specified conditions, that a material will withstand before fracture. It is a common quality control test used for both ceramic raw materials and ceramic bodies. (W)
Muffle kiln
A kiln used for firing enamelled decoration, constructed so as to protect wares from direct flame and from smoke, soot, ash and other contaminants.
Mullite
An alumino-silicate mineral. Can be formed in clay bodies if fired to an appropriate schedule. In such bodies, including porcelain, it is present as interlocking needlelike crystals, and these make important contributions to the mechanical properties.

== O ==
Once-fired, green-fired
(W) Glazed pottery that was not given separate biscuit and glost firings.
Opacifier
A group of raw materials used in glazes which, after firing, reduce the transmission of light; to make opaque. Useful to mask the colour of the underlying body.
Orton cones
A brand of pyrometric cone.
Overfired
When an article has been subject to excessive firing, either time or temperature, such that the physical properties have been adversely affected.
Overglaze
(W) See Enamel, above.
Oxidation
(W)
Oxidising firing
A firing in a kiln with an oxygen containing atmosphere.

== P ==
Paper Clay
Adding reconstituted paper pulp to ordinary plastic clay in proportions up to 50% of the total mass. This increases the unfired strength, giving an advantage to hand builders and sculptors. Careful firing is needed to avoid damage by the combustion of the paper.
Penetrometer
An instrument used to measure the hardness of a clay body. Various designs exist.
Pinholes
Faults in the surface of a ceramic body or glaze which resemble pin pricks. (W)
Plasticity
The property of clay that allows it to be manipulated and retain its shape without cracking after the shaping force has been removed.
Porcelain
A vitreous ceramic material. Generally considered to be white and if, of thin section, translucent. Compositions vary, but all are prepared by mixing selected raw materials; often kaolin can constitute around 50% of the recipe, with quartz and feldspar commonly also used.(W)
Potsherd
(W)
Potter
A person who makes ceramic articles. (W)
Potter's clay
The clay used by the potter (W)
(Potter's) Wheel
Pottery
All fired ceramic wares or materials which, when shaped, contain a significant amount of clay. Exceptions are those used for technical, structural or refractory applications. Pottery is also: (1) the art and wares made by potters; (2) a ceramic material (3) a place where pottery wares are made; and (4) the business of the potter. (W)

Published definitions of Pottery include:
- "All fired ceramic wares that contain clay when formed, except technical, structural, and refractory products."
- "China, earthenware and any article made from clay or from a mixture containing clay and other materials."
- "A class of ceramic artifacts in which clay is formed into containers by hand or in molds or with a potter's wheel, often decorated, and fired"
- "The term pottery includes many varieties of ware from the crudest vessels of prehistoric times to the most beautiful decorated porcelains, stoneware and earthenware; it also includes many articles such as large grain-jars used in ancient times for storing corn and other dry materials, wine-jars and modern sanitaryware and the large tanks for containing corrosive acids. Many kinds of earthenware, stoneware and porcelains are used for scientific and experimental purposes as well as electrical apparatus, insulators, switch-bases, sparking plugs and bases or frames for electrical heating appliances."

Production pottery
sometimes known as standardware, refers to systematic, large-scale production of identical wheel thrown pottery vessels.
Pug
Also pug mill. A machine for consolidating plastic clay or body into a firm column. It consists of a barrel which tapers at one end to a die, through which the clay or body is forced by knives mounted on a shaft which rotates centrally to the barrel. A vacuum system may be installed to de-air the clay or clay body. (W)
Pyrometer
a temperature indicator linked to a kiln via a thermocoupler.
Pyrometric cones
(W)

== Q ==
Quartz
Quartz inversion

== R ==
Recipe
The list of raw materials used to formulate a clay body or glaze. Invariably expressed as percentages, and totalling 100%. Also called formulation.
Roller-head machine
(W) Used for the mass production of pottery: a heated, rotating tool that replaces jigger and jolley to shape wares.
Raw
A clay, body or article that has not been fired.
Raw glazing
The application of a glaze to unfired ware and then firing both in a once-firing.
Reduction porcelain
Another name for hard-paste porcelain.
Reduction
Firing in an oxygen deficient atmosphere.
Refractory
Materials that are resistant to high temperature.
Rib tool
A wide, flat handheld tool used to shape, smooth or scrape clay surfaces. Usually made of wood, rubber, plastic or metal. Can be either rigid or flexible, with straight, curved or a profiled edge.

== S ==
Saggar
A refractory ceramic box used to protect wares from direct flame, fumes, fuel-ash or cinders during firing.(W)
Seconds
A finished article that has a fault, but no so grave that it is discarded. May be sold below the price of unfaulted ware. The final 's' is present even if used in the singular.
Short
Low plasticity.
Single-fired
Same as once-fired
Sintering
Solidification during firing of the individual materials in a body without the formation of any glass. This occurs in bodies with a low flux content or at low temperatures, such as in earthenware.
Slip
A suspension of clay, clay body or glaze in water.(W)
Slip casting
A technique for shaping an article by pouring a deflocculated, high-solids content slip into a porous, often plaster, mould
Slipware
pottery where decoration in slip is a main feature. Includes slip-painting, slip-trailing, and many other techniques
Slop
Another name for slurry.
Soaking
A period during a firing cycle when a set temperature is maintained. The period of time at the maintained temperature is called the soak, hold or dwell.
Soda ash
Another name for sodium carbonate, a common deflocculant.
Soda sil.
Another name for sodium silicate, a common deflocculant.
Soft-paste porcelain
Type of porcelain made with little kaolin or china clay, mostly in Europe 1720-1820. Also used for feldspathic porcelain fired in oxidising an atmosphere
Sprigging
Decoration technique whereby small moulded pieces of body are applied to an article before firing. Results in a relief decoration, such as is characteristic of Jasperware made by Wedgwood.
Spraying
Glazing pottery by the application of a glaze suspension via a compressed air gun, similar to that for applying paint to cars. Also called aerographing.
Stilt
small supports used to prevent glazes from fusing the pot to the kiln during firing.
Stoneware
A vitreous or semivitreous whiteware. Traditionally made primarily from nonrefractory fire clays. Compositions vary considerably, and include both prepared and 'as dug'; the former being by far the dominant type for studio and industry. Invariably darker coloured than porcelain and fired at higher temperatures than earthenware. (W)
Seger cone
A type of pyrometric device. Pyrometric cone
Slumping
The unwanted deformation of an article occurring at high temperature in a kiln. Also known as pyroplastic deformation.
Slurry
An aqueous suspension of clay and water. Generally lower solids content than slip.
Spangling
Fault similar to pinholes, although the term is generally only used with vitreous china sanitaryware.

== T ==
Terracotta
Earthenware, usually reddish in colour and often unglazed. Some disciplines define it by the type of object made rather than the material. Used for sculptures and in archaeology for fired clay objects that are not pottery vessels.(W)
Tin-glazed
A ceramic glaze that is white, glossy and opaque, which is normally applied to red or buff earthenware. Tin-glaze is plain lead glaze with a small amount of tin oxide added. Often brightly decorated.(W)
Tow
Coarse fibre used to fettle unfired ware. Traditionally natural materials, such as flax or hemp.
Thermal shock
High stress in an article due to the sudden creation of a large thermal gradient. If the stress is sufficiently high it can result in the formation of a crack, such as a dunt.
Throwing
Shaping an article from a clay body on a potter's wheel. (W)
Tile crank

== U ==
Underfired
When an article has been subject to insufficient firing, either time or temperature, such that the physical properties have been adversely affected.
Underglaze
Decoration applied to unglazed pottery and covered with a glaze. (W)

== V ==
Viscometer
An instrument used to measure the viscosity of a slip. Various designs exist.
Vitreous
For glaze: the presence of glass. For bodies: the absence of permeability to water.
Vitreous China
A vitreous ceramic used for sanitaryware, such as toilets. Often abbreviated to VC.
Vitrification
Process by which ceramic raw materials fuse to become non-permeable after firing.

== W ==
Wad box
A simple wall mounted piston extruder used to produce long coils from a single mass of clay body.
Water Absorption
The mass of water absorbed by a porous ceramic material, under specified conditions, expressed as a percentage of the mass of the dry material. It is a common quality control test used for both fired raw materials and fired ceramic bodies. Often abbreviated to WABS. (W)
Wax resist
A decorating technique where liquid wax is applied to ware to create a pattern. When an aqueous glaze suspension is then applied to the whole article the waxed areas repel the glaze, whereas unwaxed areas are coated. The wax burns away during firing.
Wedging
A procedure for preparing clay or a clay body by hand: the lump of clay is repeatedly thrown down on a work bench; between each operation the lump is turned and sometimes cut through and rejoined in a different orientation. The object is to disperse the water more uniformly, to remove lamination and to remove air. (W)
Whiteware
A term for ceramic bodies that are white in colour, whether because they fire to white, or have a white ceramic glaze.
