= Kiln furniture =

Devices put in furnaces when firing ceramics

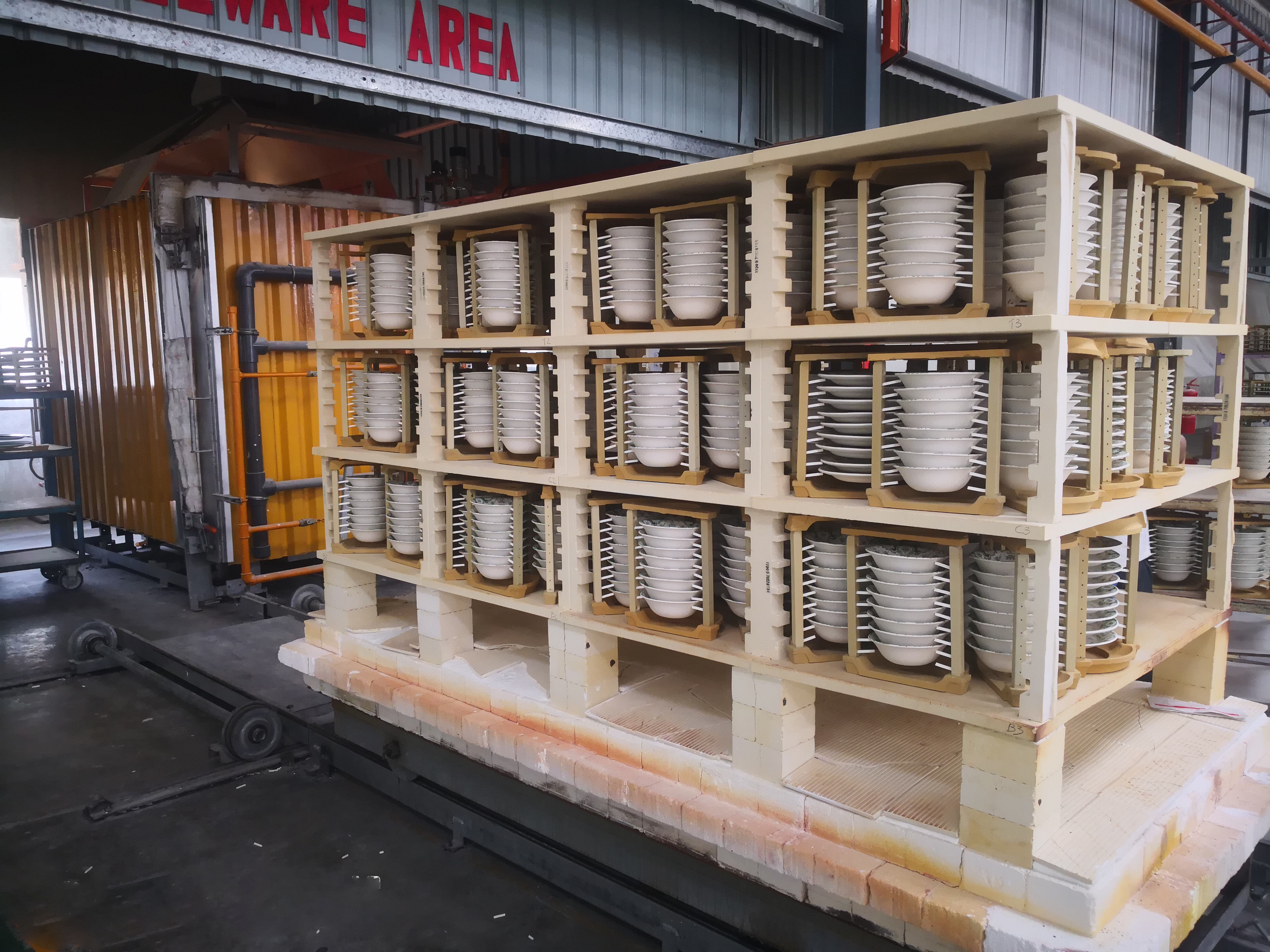
Kiln furniture before glost firing

Kiln furniture are devices and implements inside furnaces used during the heating of manufactured individual pieces, such as pottery, other ceramic or metal components. Kiln furniture is made of refractory materials, i.e., materials that withstand high temperatures without deformation. Kiln furniture can account for up to 80% of the mass of a kiln charge.

== Materials ==
Commonly used materials are cordierite (up to 1275 °C), mullite (up to 1750 °C), silicon carbide (up to 1500 °C), alumina (up to 1750 °C), zirconia (up to 1650 °C). The choice depends on cost, weight, and physical properties.

== Functions and effects ==
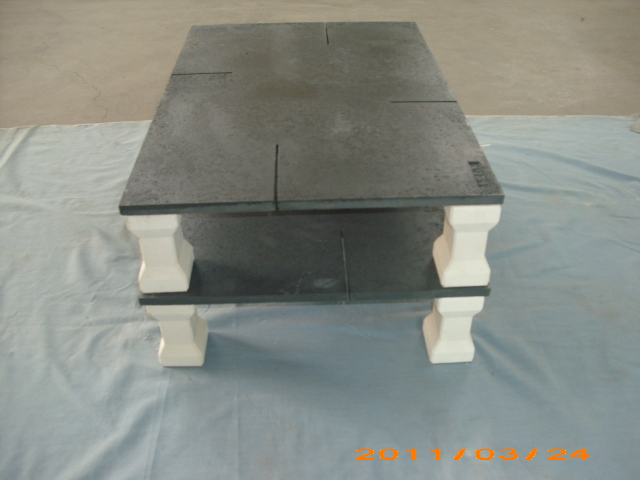
Two silicon carbide kiln shelves

Functions of kiln furniture include carrying the kiln/furnace load and protecting the load from various kinds of damage: open fire, smoke, debris, from deforming or sticking the components to each other. In addition to various carriers and plates, capsules with heating material may be used.

Kiln furniture influences the heat distribution in the furnace and the interaction of the load with the atmosphere in the furnace. Since the furniture is being heated along with the load, this increases energy consumption hence the operating costs increase. An additional increase of costs comes from wear of the furniture due to thermomechanical and chemical stresses. To decrease heat capacity porous materials or thinner furniture components may be used. However this calls for a trade-off with load-bearing capacity and stress resistance.

== Types of kiln furniture ==
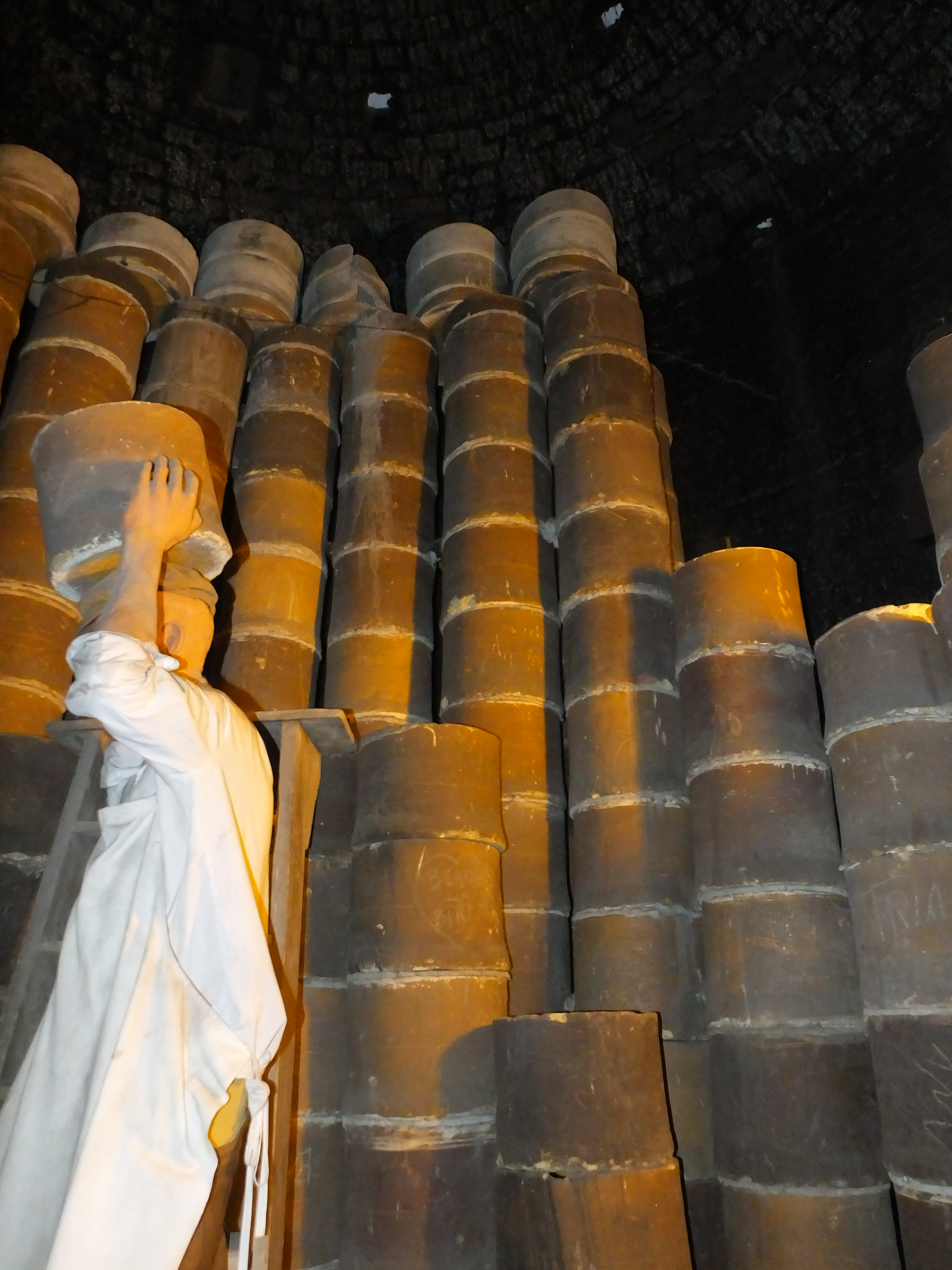
Bungs of saggars inside a bottle kiln

A saggar (also misspelled as sagger or segger) is a ceramic boxlike container used in the firing of pottery to enclose or protect ware being fired inside a kiln. Saggars have been used to protect, or safeguard, ware from open flame, smoke, gases and kiln debris. Traditionally, saggars were made primarily from fireclay. Modern saggars are made of alumina ceramic, cordierite ceramic, mullite ceramic silicon carbide and in special cases from zirconia.

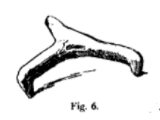
A pernette from an archaeological find. Placed into a kiln upside down with respect to the drawing

A pernette or stilt is a prop to support pottery in a kiln so that pottery does not touch each other or kiln's floor. In archaeology, they may be upside-down fired clay tripods, leaving characteristic marks at the bottoms of the pottery/porcelain. They expose the bottom of the fired piece to the full heat.

Other types of furniture and furniture systems include kiln cars, kiln shelves, batts, tiles, and plates; tubes and beams; props and fittings, profile setters, rollers, stools; T-cranks, Y-cranks, pin cranks. The design of kiln furniture system depends on the wares manufactured: structural clay products, dinnerware, tiles, electronics ceramics, sanitaryware, electrical porcelain, etc.
