= Majolica =

Term used to describe two types of pottery

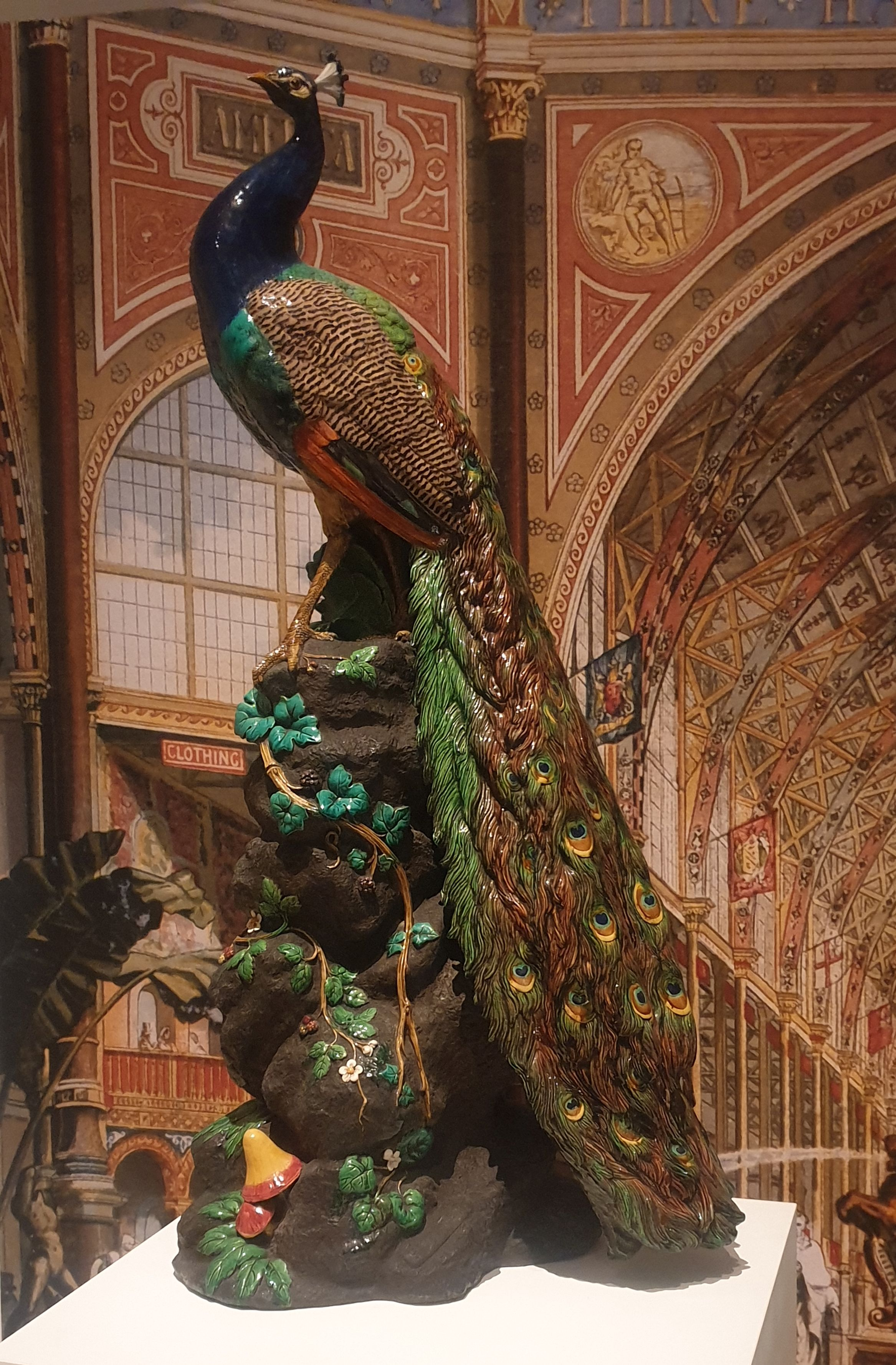
Minton majolica peacock, c. 1870

In different periods of time and in different countries, the term majolica has been used for two distinct types of pottery.

Firstly, from the mid-15th century onwards, maiolica was a type of pottery reaching Italy from Spain, Majorca and beyond. This was made by a tin-glaze process (dip, dry, paint, fire), resulting in an opaque white glazed surface decorated with brush-painting in metal oxide enamel colour(s). During the 17th century, the English added the letter j to their alphabet. Maiolica thereafter was commonly anglicized to majolica.

Secondly, from mid- to late 19th century, majolica was made by a simpler process (painting and then firing) whereby coloured lead silicate glazes were applied directly to an article, then fired. This resulted in brightly coloured, hard-wearing, inexpensive wares that were both useful and decorative, often with a naturalistic style. This type of majolica was introduced to the public at the 1851 Great Exhibition in London, later widely copied and mass-produced. Minton & Co., who developed the coloured lead glazes product, also developed and exhibited at the 1851 Exhibition a tin-glazed product in imitation of Italian maiolica which also became known as majolica.

== Terminology ==
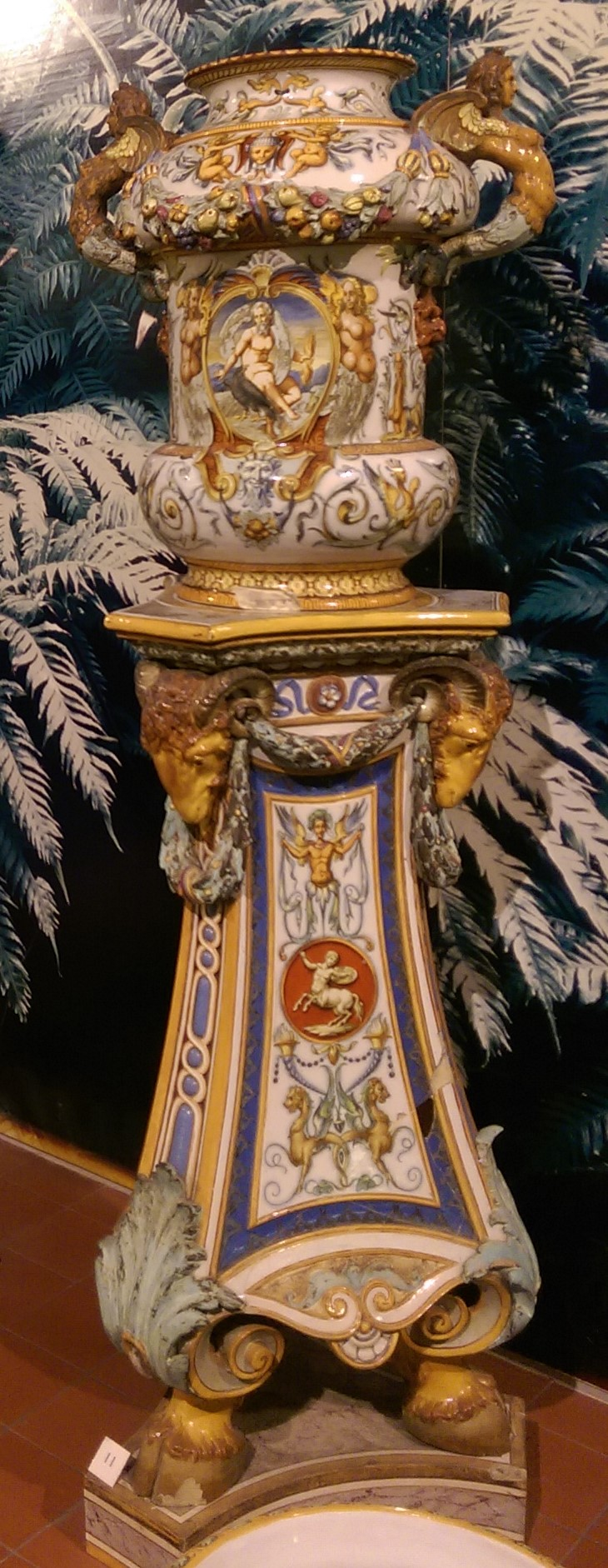
English tin-glazed majolica. First shown at the 1851 Exhibition by Minton & Co., Exhibit Number 74. Potteries Museum, Stoke-on-Trent, UK

The notes in this article append tin-glazed to the word meaning 'opaque white tin-glaze, painted in enamels', and coloured glazes to the word meaning 'coloured lead glazes, applied direct to the biscuit'.

=== Mintons' description ===
Leon Arnoux, the artistic and technical director of Mintons, wrote in 1852, "We understand by majolica a pottery formed of a calcareous clay gently fired, and covered with an opaque enamel composed of sand, lead, and tin...".

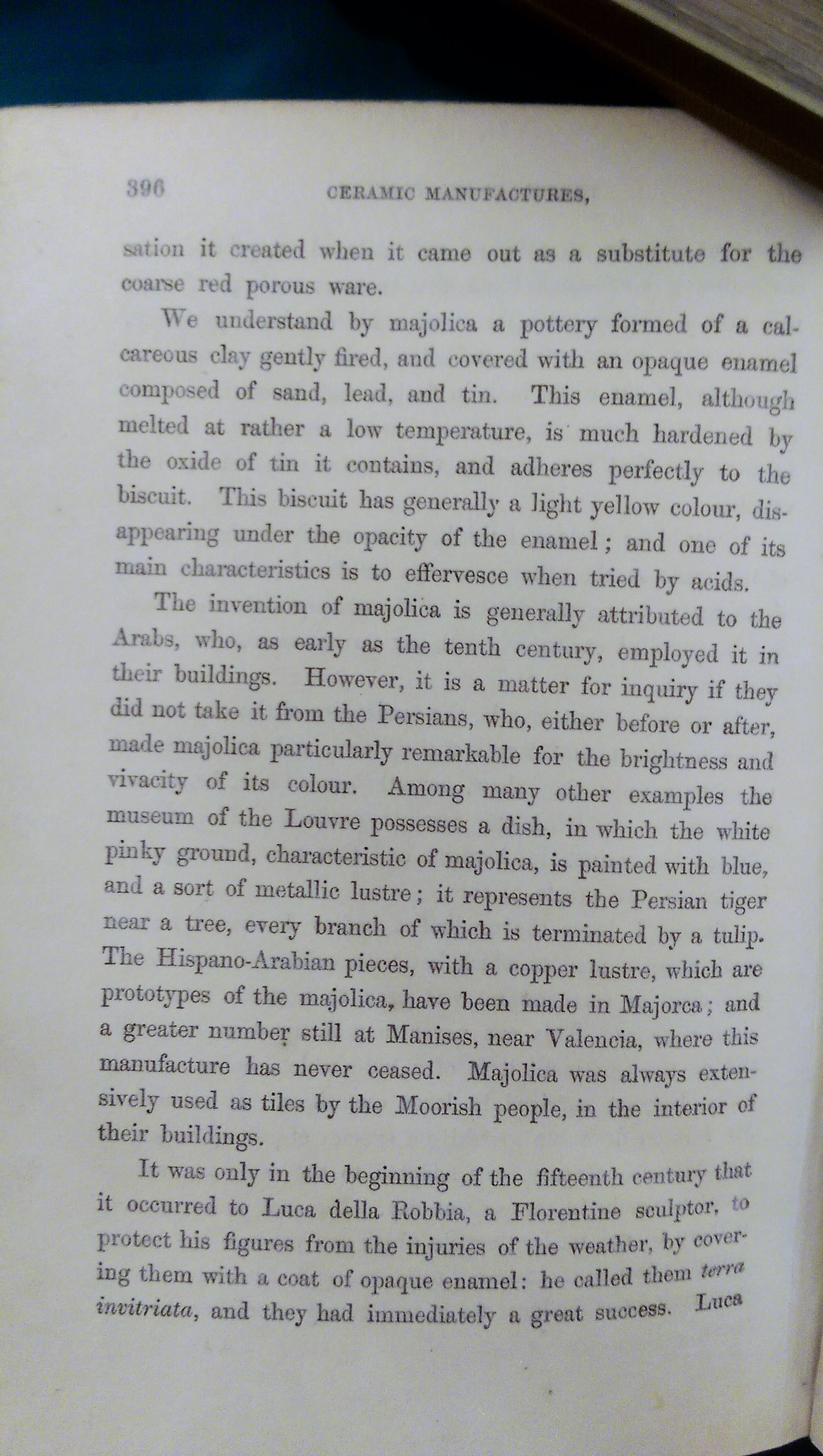
Leon Arnoux, 1853, describing Minton's tin-glazed product.

Arnoux was describing the Minton & Co. tin-glazed product made in imitation of Italian maiolica both in process and in styles. Tin-glaze is simply plain lead glaze with a little tin oxide added. His description is often referenced, in error, as a definition of Minton's other new product, the much copied and later mass-produced ceramic sensation of the Victorian era, Minton's coloured lead glazes, Palissy ware. The 16th-century French pottery of Bernard Palissy was well known and much admired. Mintons adopted the name 'Palissy ware' for their new coloured glazes product, but this soon became known also as majolica.

=== Majolica described according to design as opposed to process ===
Some authors describe Minton majolica as falling into two main design styles: wares inspired by the natural world (naturalistic), and those inspired by historical wares (revivalist).

=== Minton Archive first design for majolica ===
Thomas Kirkby's design G144 in the Minton Archive is inscribed "This is the First Design for Majolica...". The design is Italian Renaissance in style. Close-up images illustrate a design suited for fine brushwork on flat surfaces. The design is for Minton's rare tin-glaze majolica imitation of Italian tin-glaze maiolica. Minton's designs for Palissy ware, also known as majolica, were suited for 'thick' painting of coloured lead glazes onto surfaces moulded in relief to make best use of the intaglio effect.

== Coloured glazes earthenware ==
Earthenware coated with coloured lead glazes applied directly to an unglazed body has from the mid-19th century onwards been called majolica, e.g.: 20th-century majolica, Mexican majolica, Sarreguemines majolica, Palissy majolica, majolica-glazed Parian ware. The science involved in the development of multiple temperature compatible coloured lead glazes was complex, but the process itself was simple (paint, fire). This majolica is the vibrantly coloured, frequently naturalistic style of earthenware developed and named Palissy ware by Minton & Co. and introduced to the public at the 1851 Great Exhibition that was mass-produced throughout Europe and America and is widely available. In English this majolica is never spelt with an i in place of the j. It is, however, pronounced both with a hard j as in major and with a soft j as in maiolica. In some other languages i is indeed used for both coloured glazes earthenware and for tin-glazed earthenware: French maïolique (but also majolique) and Italian maiolica.

Examples of coloured glazes majolica (paint, fire)

Biscuitware was painted with thick coloured lead glazes simultaneously, then fired. The process requires just two stages and skill in painting. When fired in the kiln, every colour fuses to the body, usually without running into each other. The ceramic technology, which transformed the fortunes of Mintons, was developed by art director Leon Arnoux.

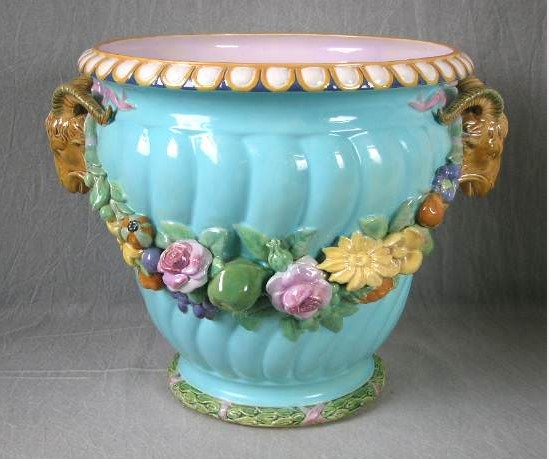
Coloured lead glazes majolica, flowers moulded in high relief. Shape first shown at the 1851 Exhibition by Minton & Co., Exhibit Number 60.

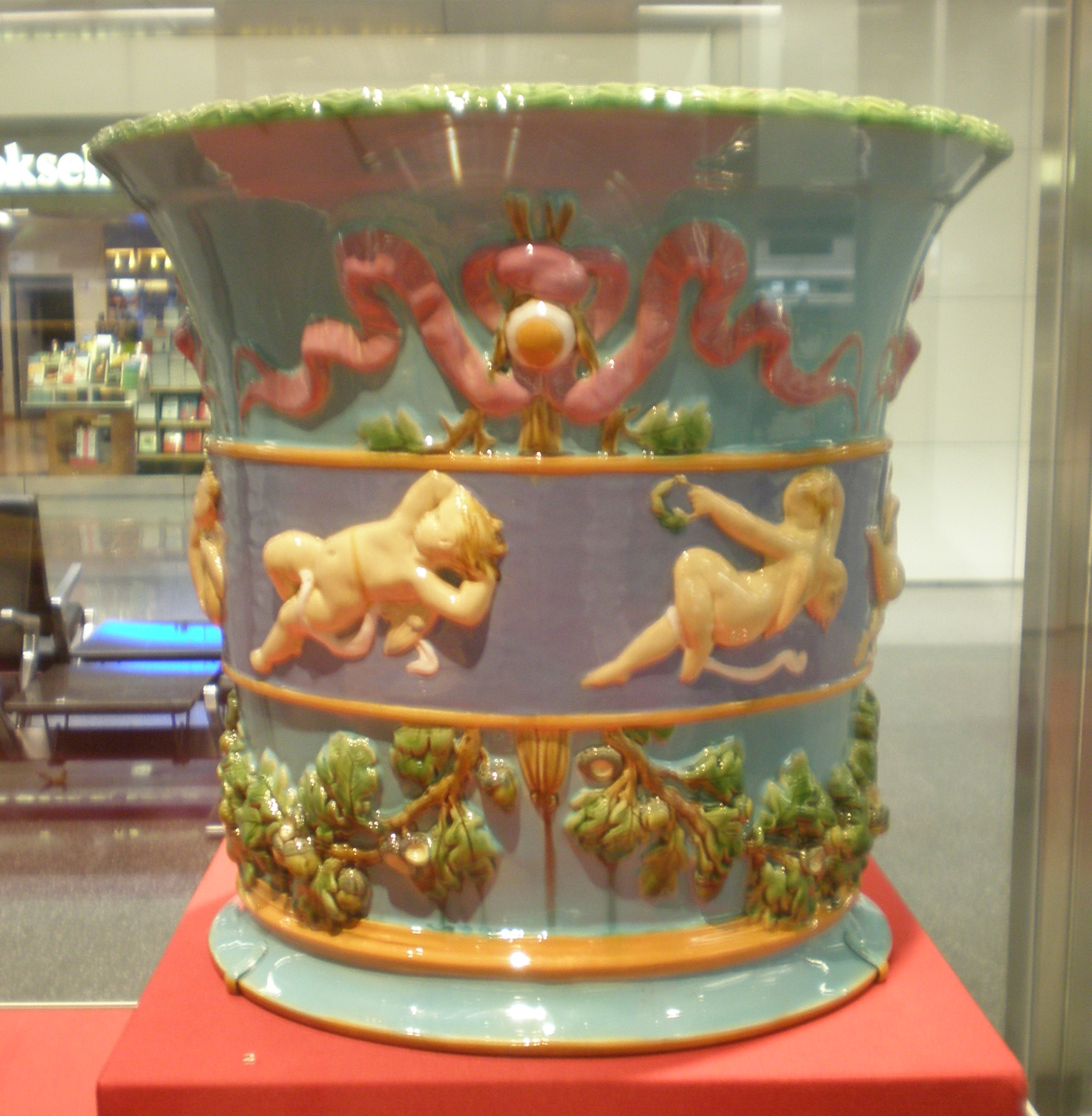
Coloured lead glazes majolica jardinière, moulded in high relief, Mintons, second half 19th century.

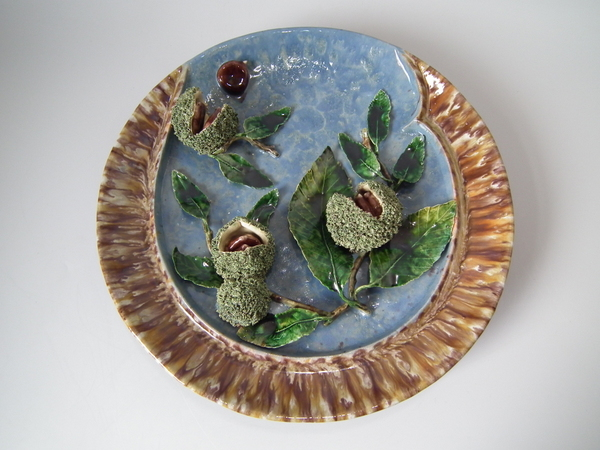
Coloured lead glazes Palissy majólica, mottled glazes, applied fruits, late 19th century, Elias, Portugal

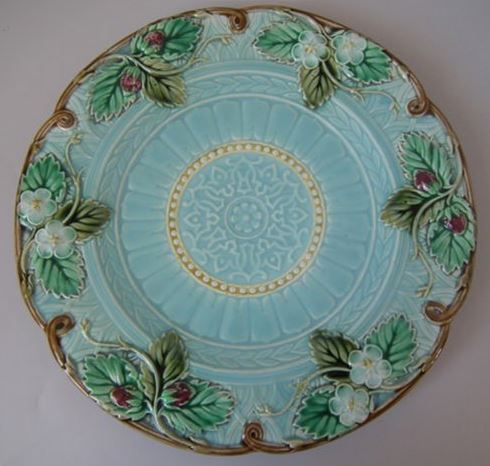
Sarreguemines Majolica Majolique plate, moulded in relief, late 19th century, France. Good example of intaglio effect.

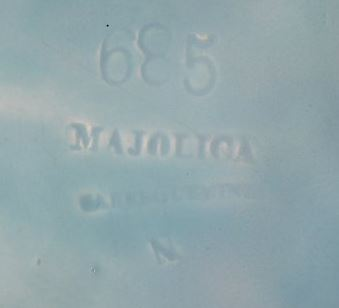
Sarreguemines Majolique plate, reverse. Impressed 'MAJOLICA' for English-speaking export markets.

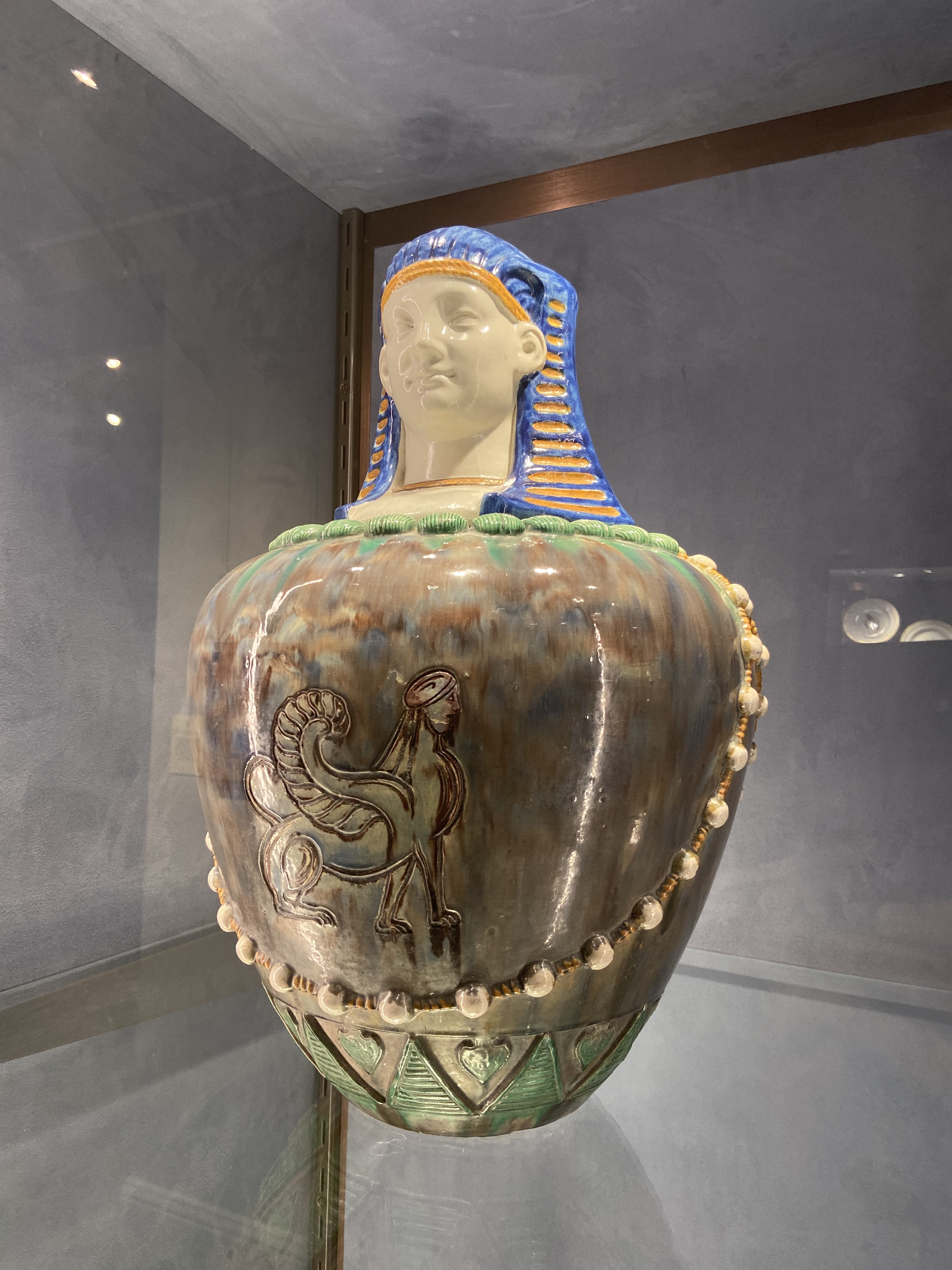
Majolica Canopic Jar

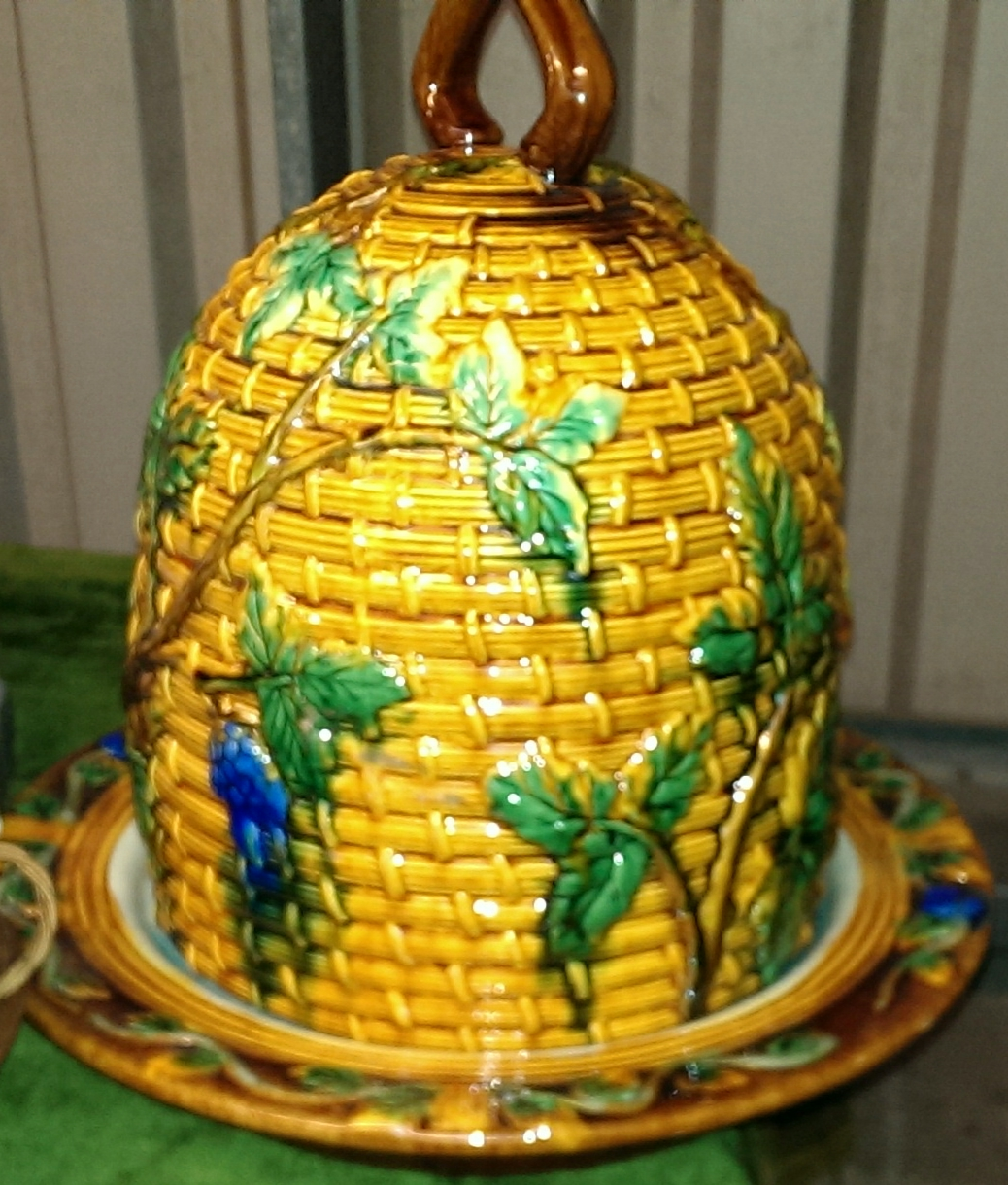
Late 20th century majolica, fake Minton, running glazes, wrong colours, fake makers marks.

== Tin-glazed earthenware ==
Tin-glazed earthenware having an opaque white glaze with painted overglaze decoration of metal oxide enamel colour(s) is known as maiolica. It reached Italy by the mid-15th century. It is frequently prone to flaking and somewhat delicate. The word is also spelt with a j, majolica. In contemporary England the use of maiolica spelt with an i tends to be restricted to Renaissance Italian maiolica. In the US majolica spelt with a j is used for both coloured glazes majolica and tin-glazed. In France and other countries, tin-glazed maiolica developed also as faience, and in UK and Netherlands as delftware. In France, Germany, Italy, Spain, Mexico and Portugal, tin-glazed wares are called maïolique (majolique), majolika, maiolica, mayólica, talavera, and majólica respectively.

Examples of tin-glazed maiolica (dip, dry, paint, fire)

Ware dipped (or coated) in tin glaze, set aside to dry, brush-painted on the unfired glaze, then fired. Process requires four separate stages and high skill in painting.

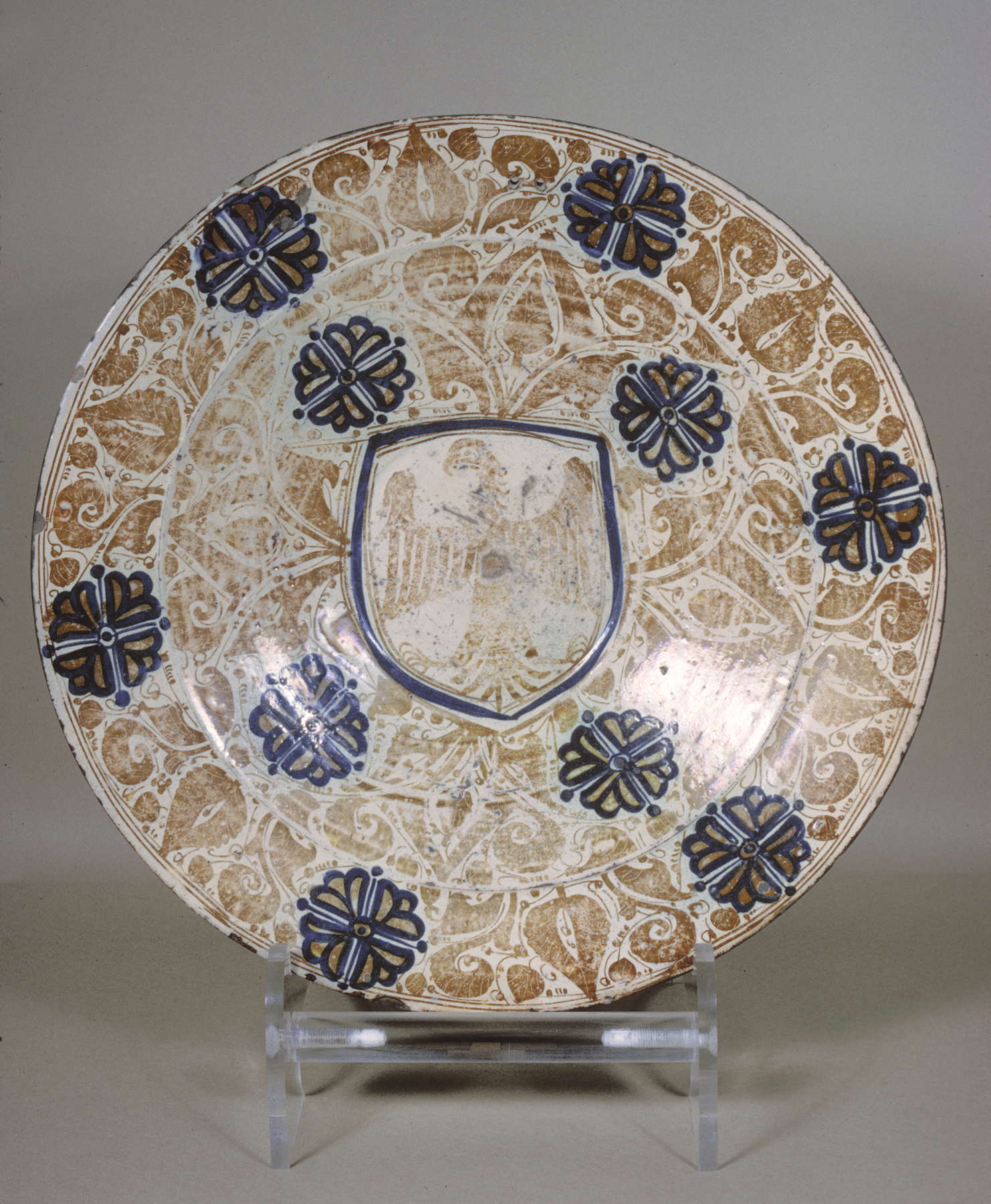
Hispano-Moresque maiolica, c. 1450, tin-glazed with lustre decoration, Moorish Spain.

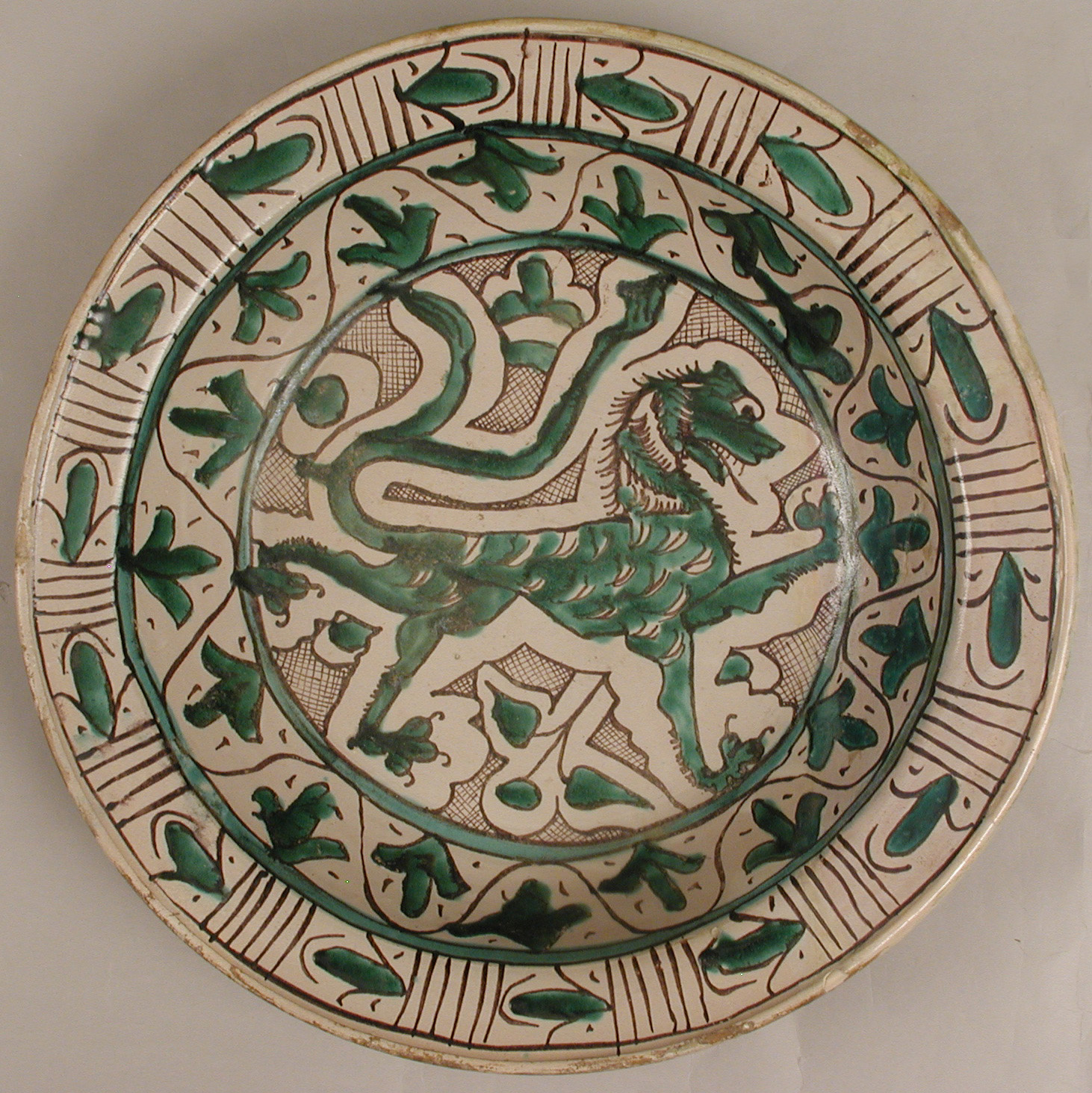
"Earthenware, tin-glaze (Majolica), early 15th century, Italy." Metropolitan Museum NY.

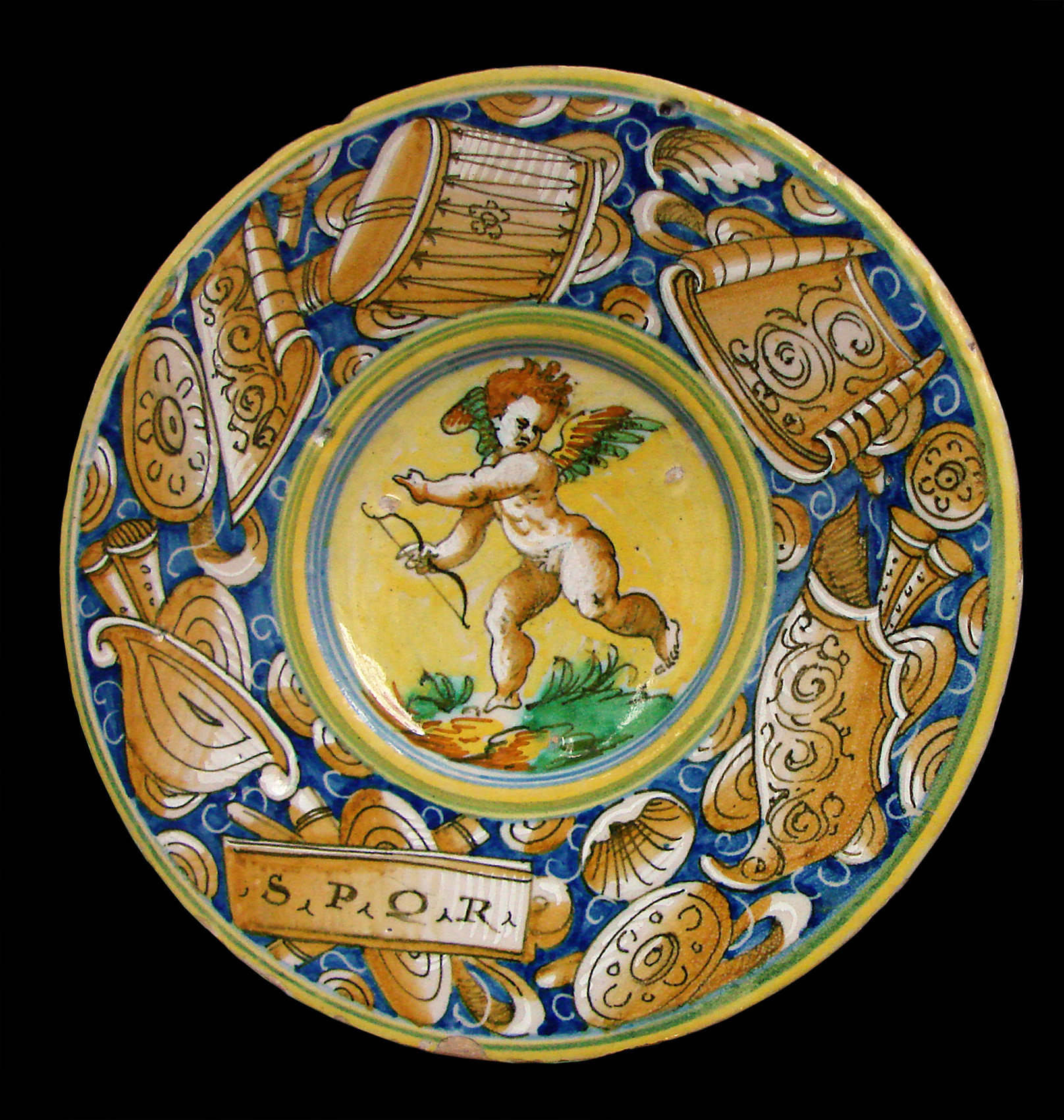
Tin-glazed Italian Renaissance maiolica, 1550–1570.

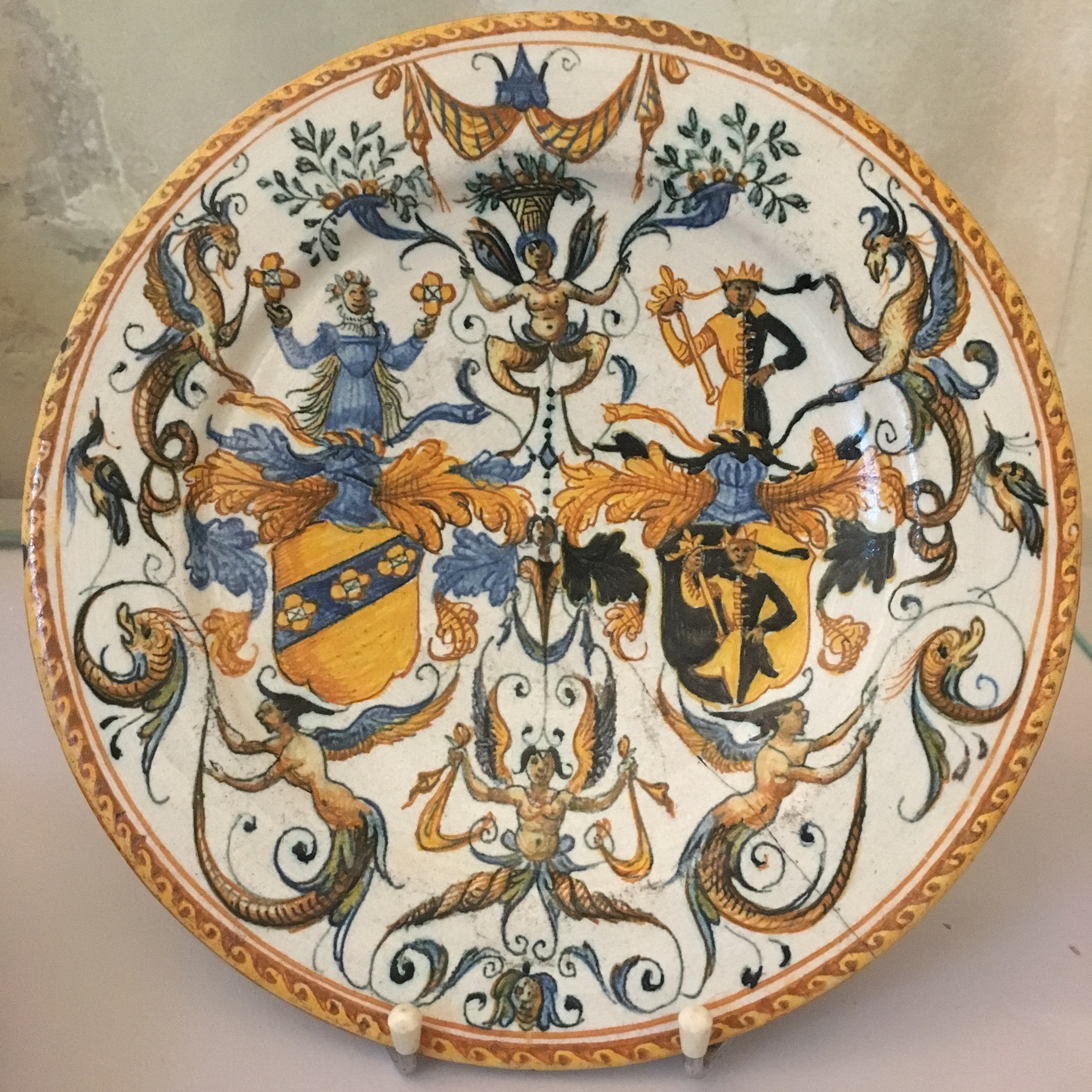
Tin-glazed majolique armoriée, France, late 16th century. Italian Renaissance Grotesque style.

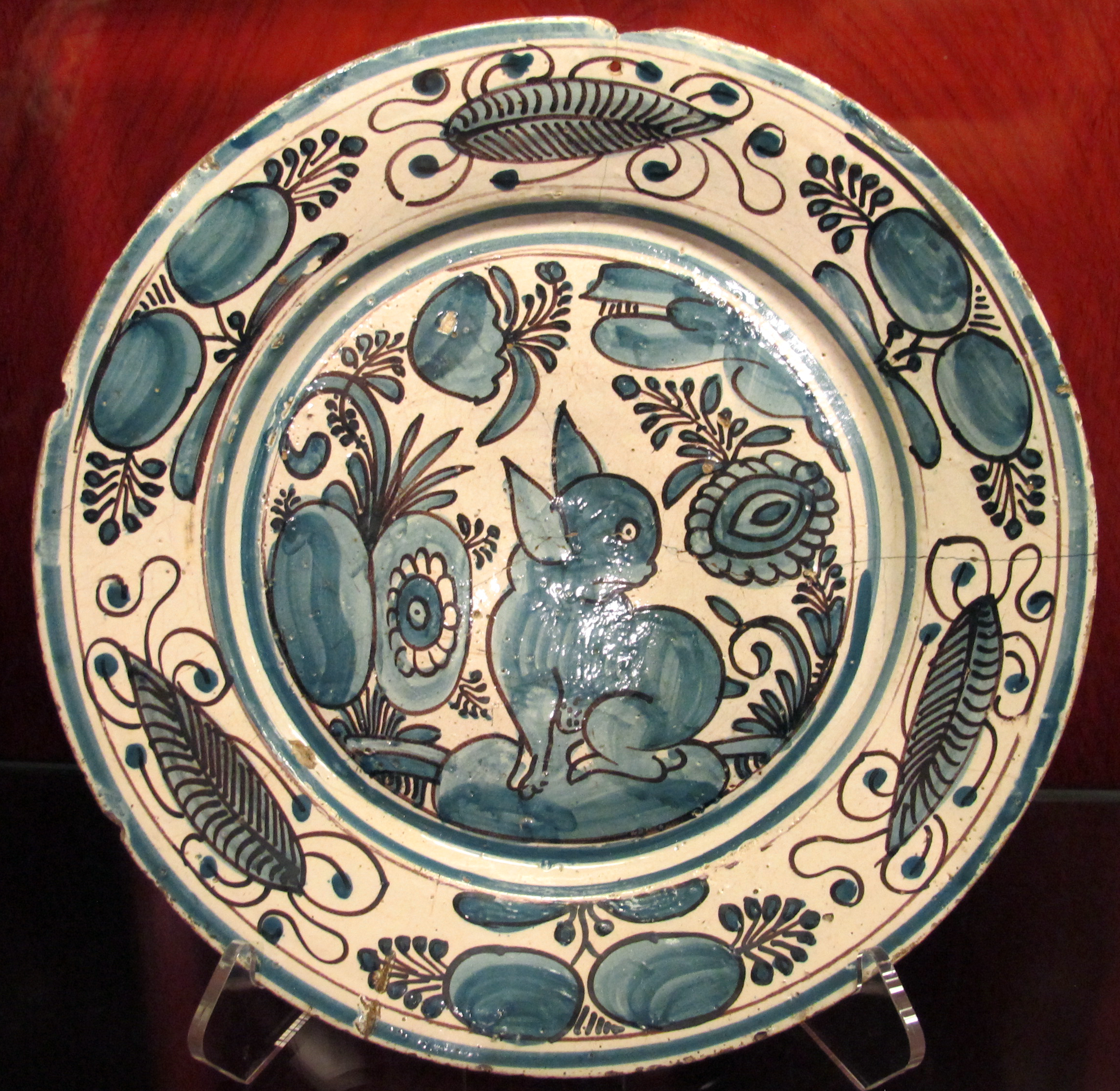
Tin-glazed Spanish maiolica, late 17th century.

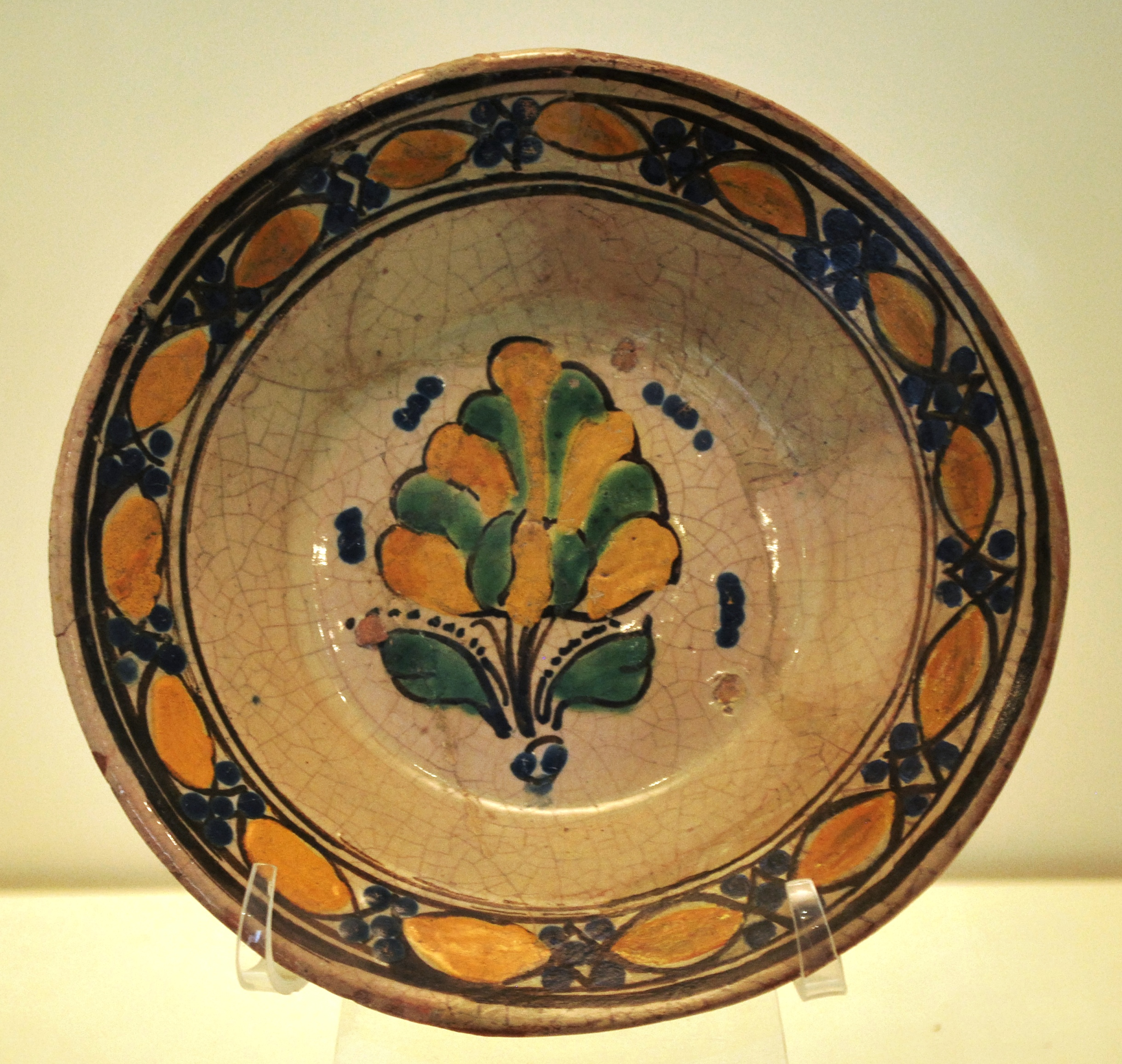
Tin-glazed 17th century Talavera, also called majolica, Mexico.

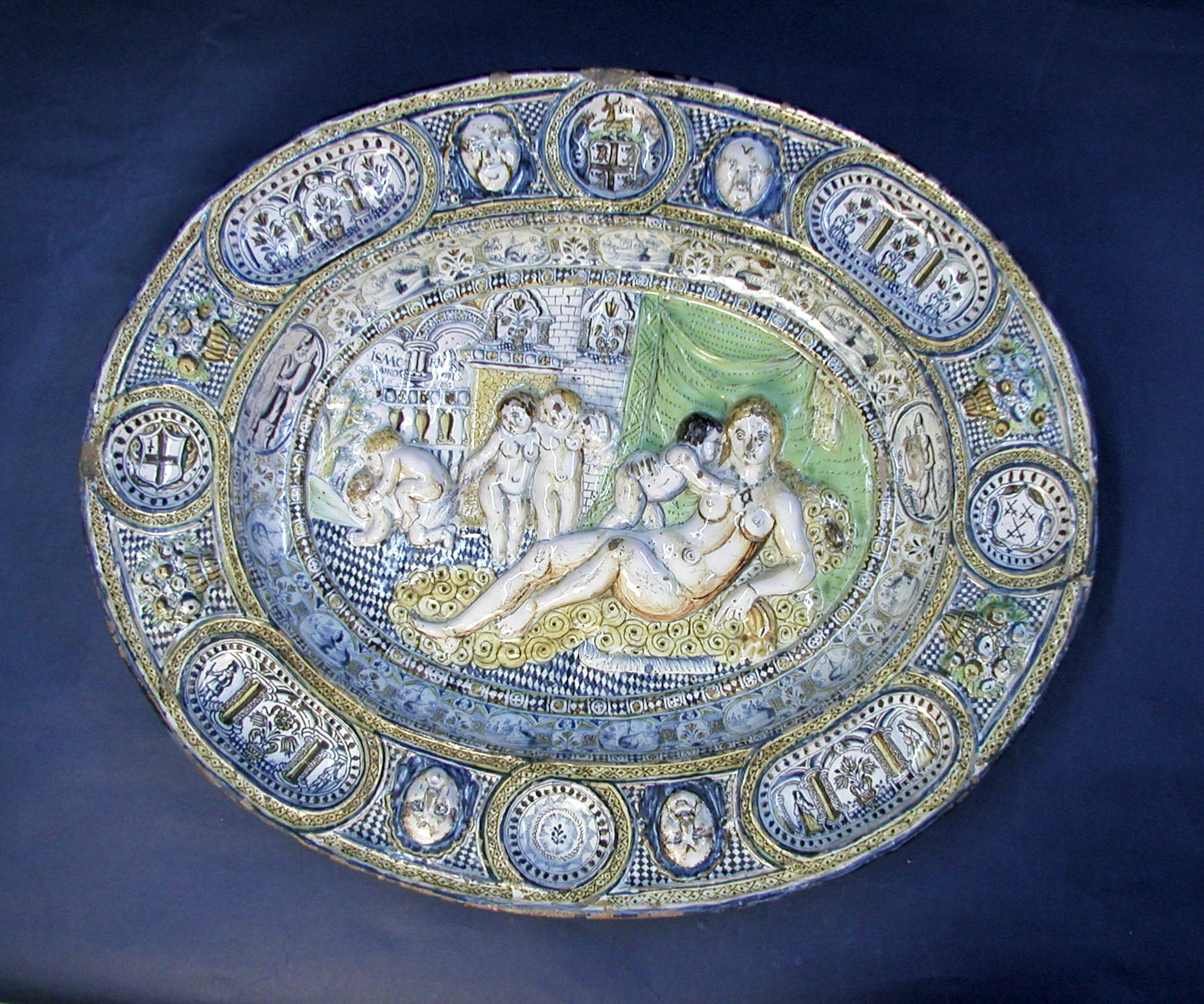
Tin-glazed London Delftware charger, mid-17th century, in imitation of mid-16th century Palissy coloured glazes charger 'La Fecundite'.

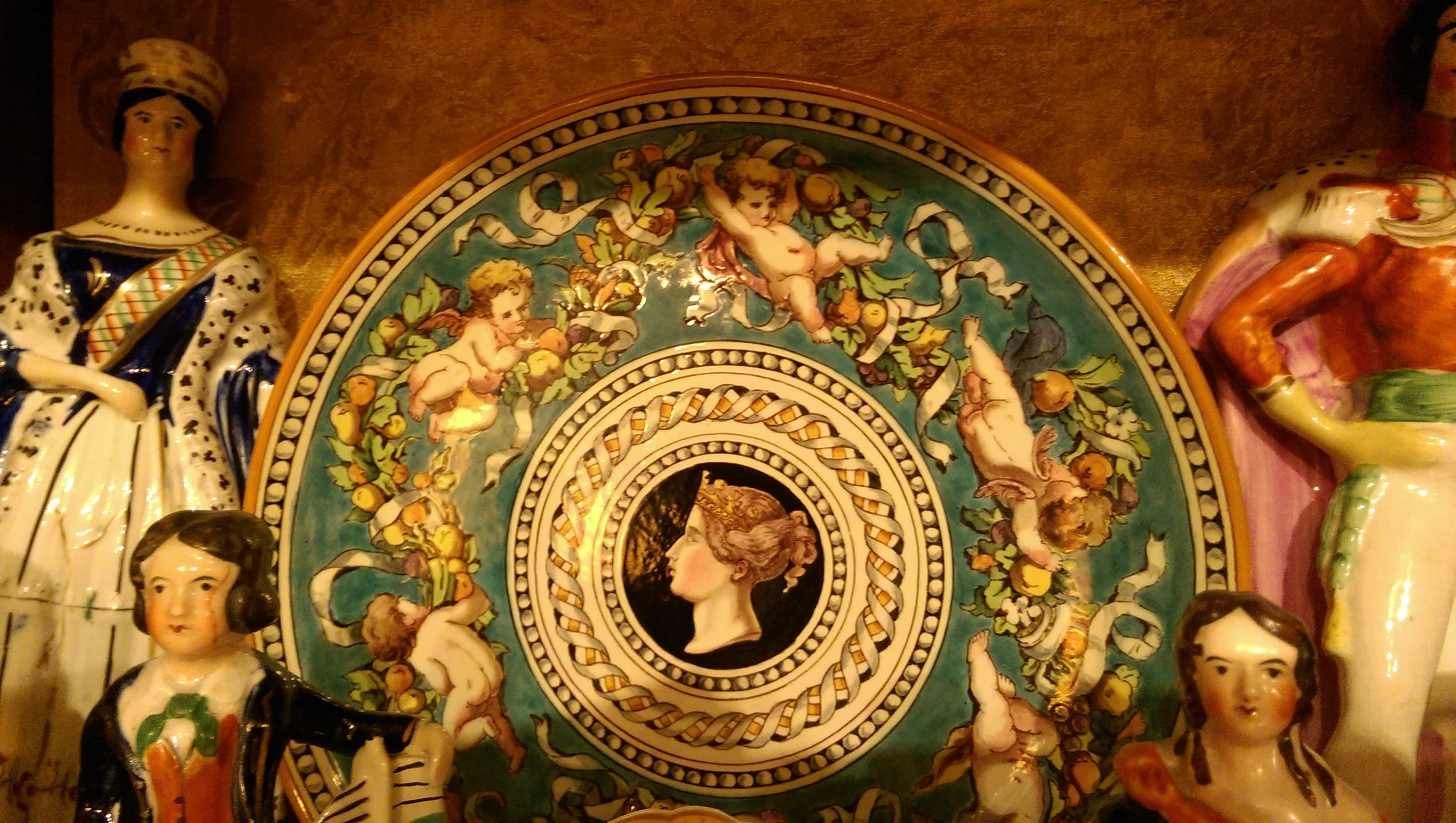
Rare tin-glazed Minton 'majolica' Victoria plate, brush-painted decoration on flat surface in Renaissance style, mid-19th century (1853).

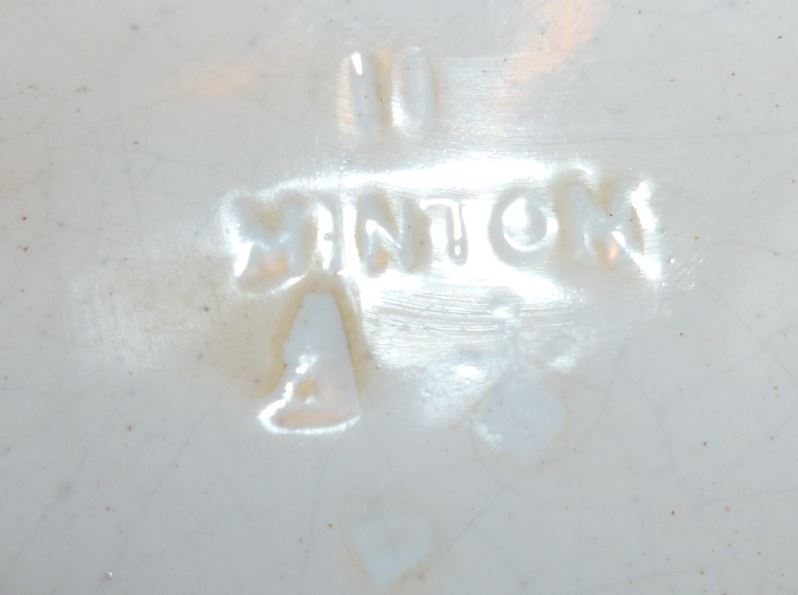
Rare tin-glazed Minton 'majolica' Victoria plate, reverse, opaque white tin-glaze.

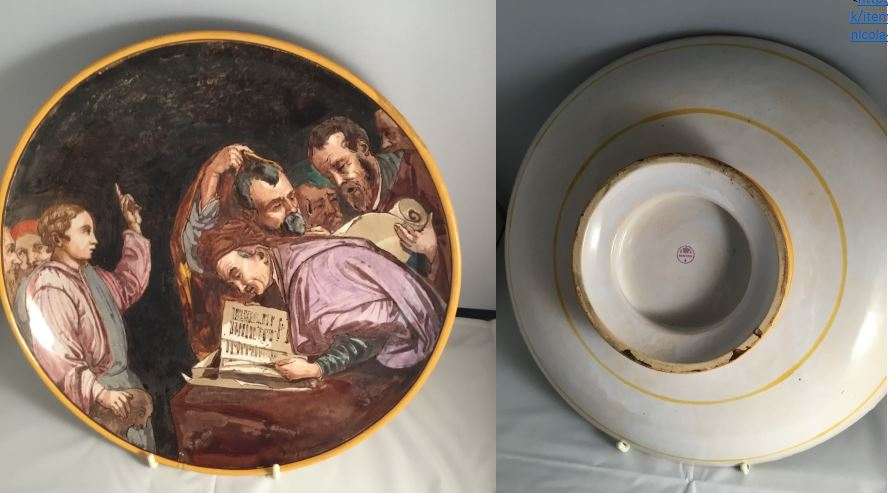
Rare tin-glazed Minton Majolica, mid-19th century (1870), in imitation of Italian Renaissance istoriato style maiolica.

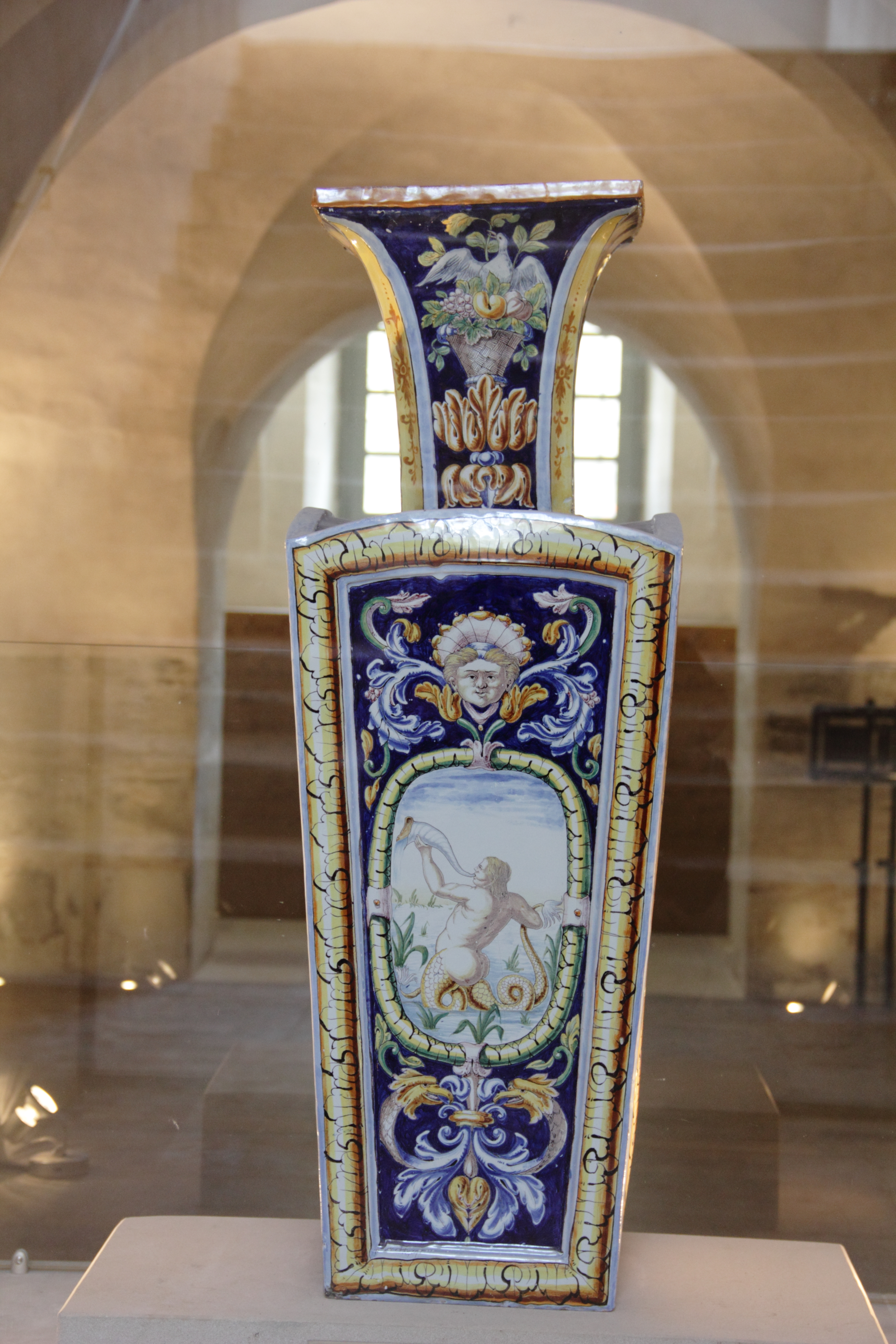
Tin-glazed faience, Luneville, France, late 19th century. Renaissance style.

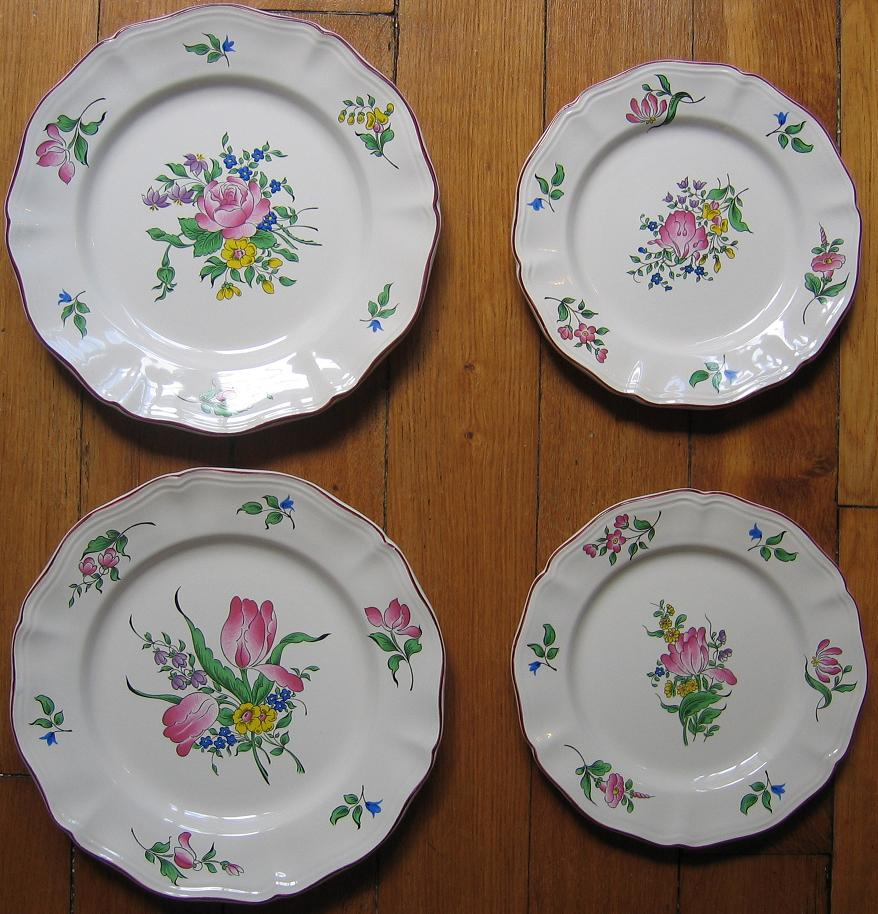
Tin-glazed faience, fine painted colours on opaque white tin glaze, France.

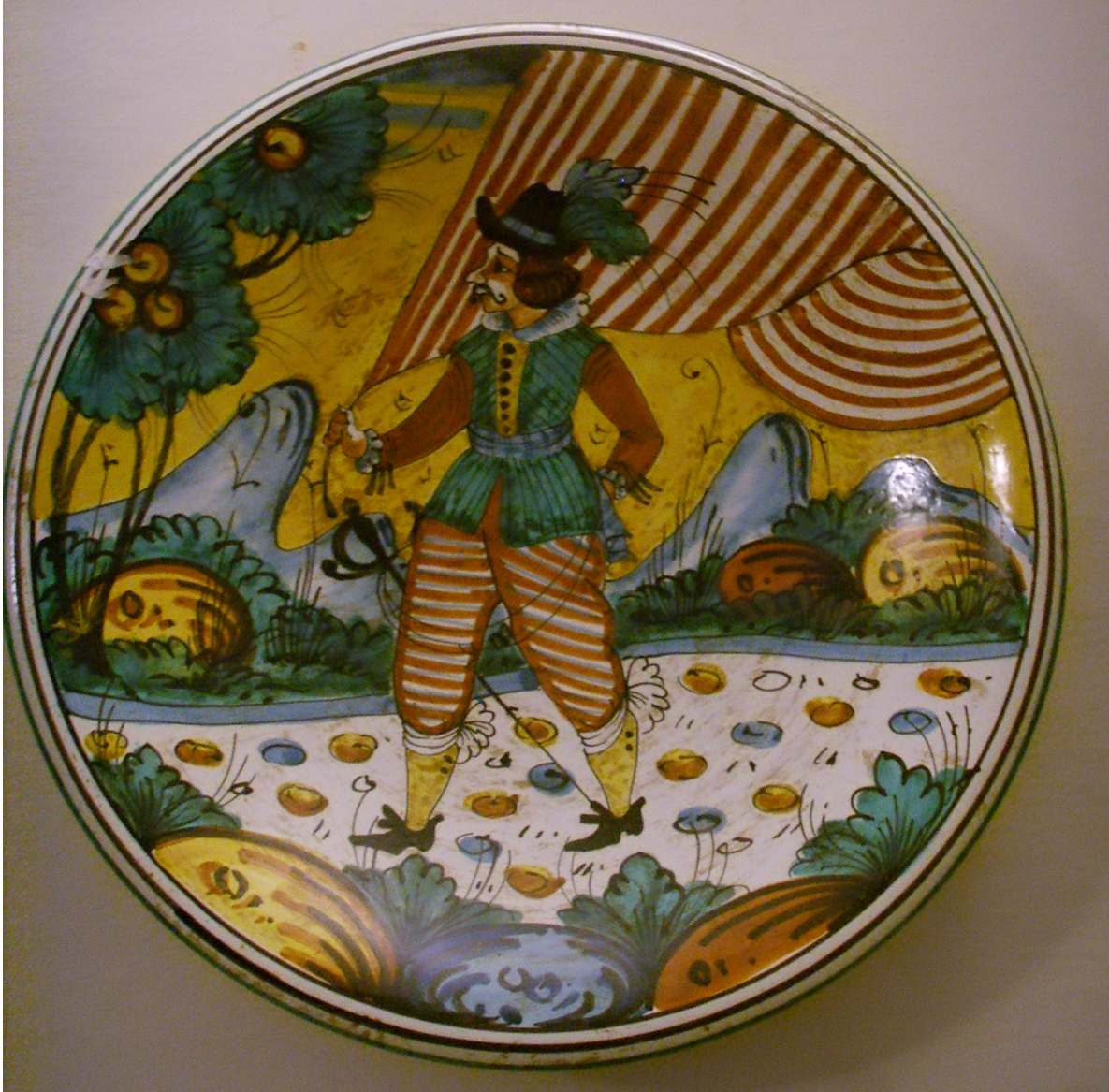
Tin-glazed 20th century maiolica, Italy.

== Majolica types, detail ==
Examples showing detail of coloured glazes majolica (paint, fire) versus tin-glazed majolica (dip, dry, paint, fire).

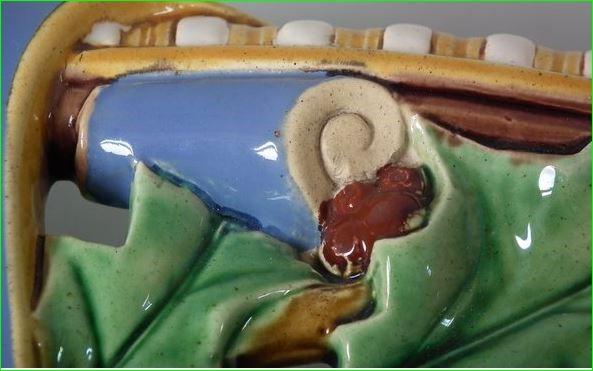
Coloured glazes (paint, fire) majolica, 'thick painted' on buff body (exposed by glaze miss), relief surfaces showing intaglio effect.

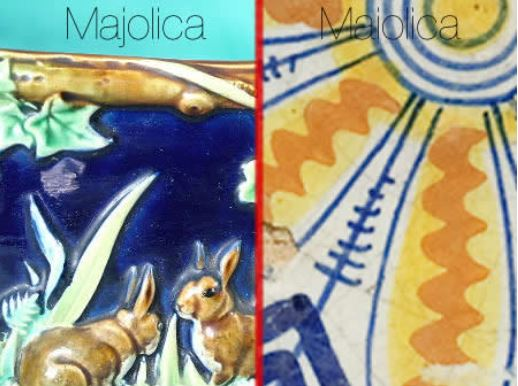
Left, Coloured glazes majolica, 'thick' painting on moulding in relief produces intaglio effect on green leaf. Right, tin-glazed majolica/maiolica, fine brush painting on flat surface, no intaglio effect.

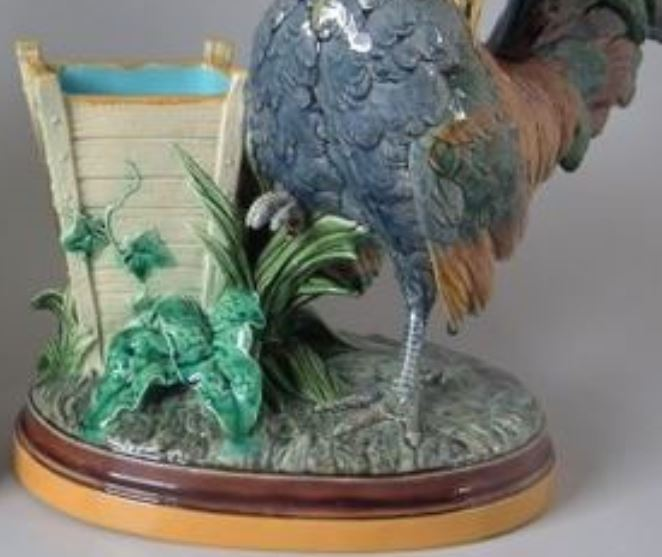
Minton coloured glazes (paint, fire) majolica, 'thick' painted coloured lead glazes on relief moulded surfaces making maximum use of intaglio effect. Naturalistic style.

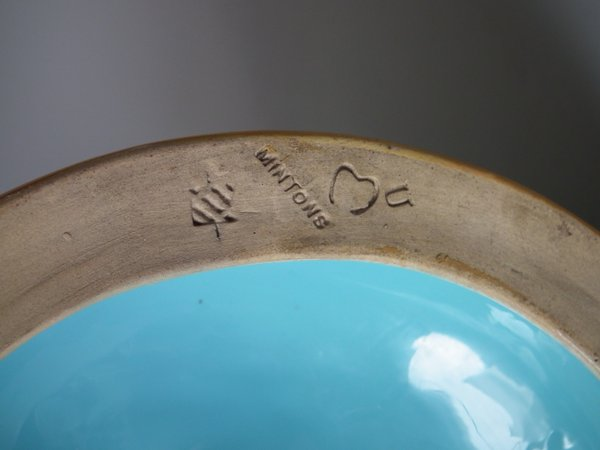
Minton coloured glazes (paint, fire) majolica cockerel/rooster base detail, 1875 cypher, unglazed base rim (not dipped), 'thick' painted coloured glaze, not fine brush-work.

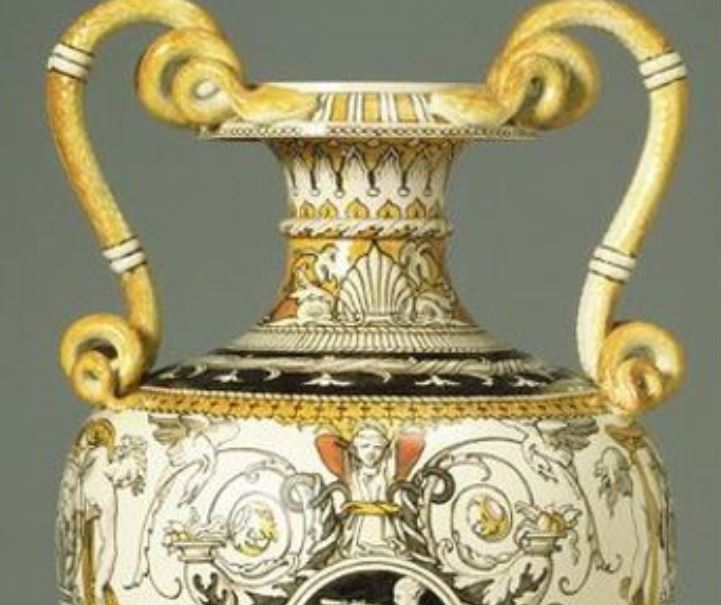
Minton tin-glazed (dip, dry, paint, fire) majolica, opaque white tin-glaze on flat surfaces, fine brush-painted decoration. Italian Renaissance style.

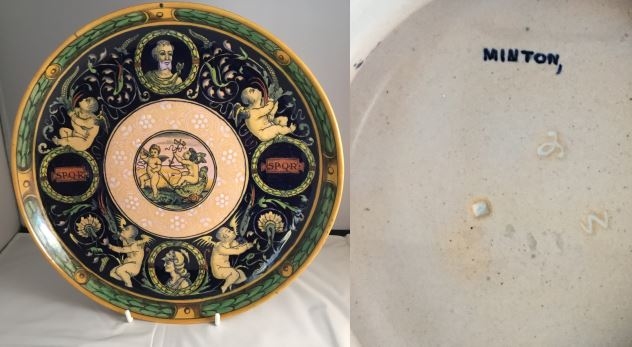
Minton tin-glazed (dip, dry, paint, fire) majolica, opaque white tin-glaze on flat surfaces, brush-painted 'MINTON', 1860 date cypher. Italian Renaissance style.

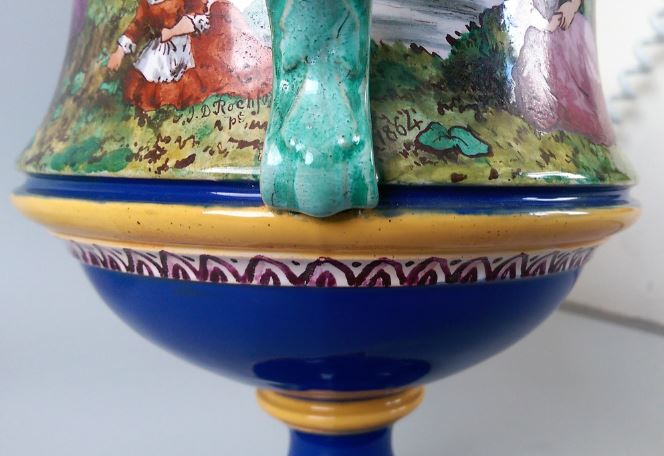
Tin-glazed Minton majolica, 1864, coated, brush-painted on flat surfaces, artist Rochfort. Possibly a combination of coloured glazes and tin-glaze decorated in enamels.

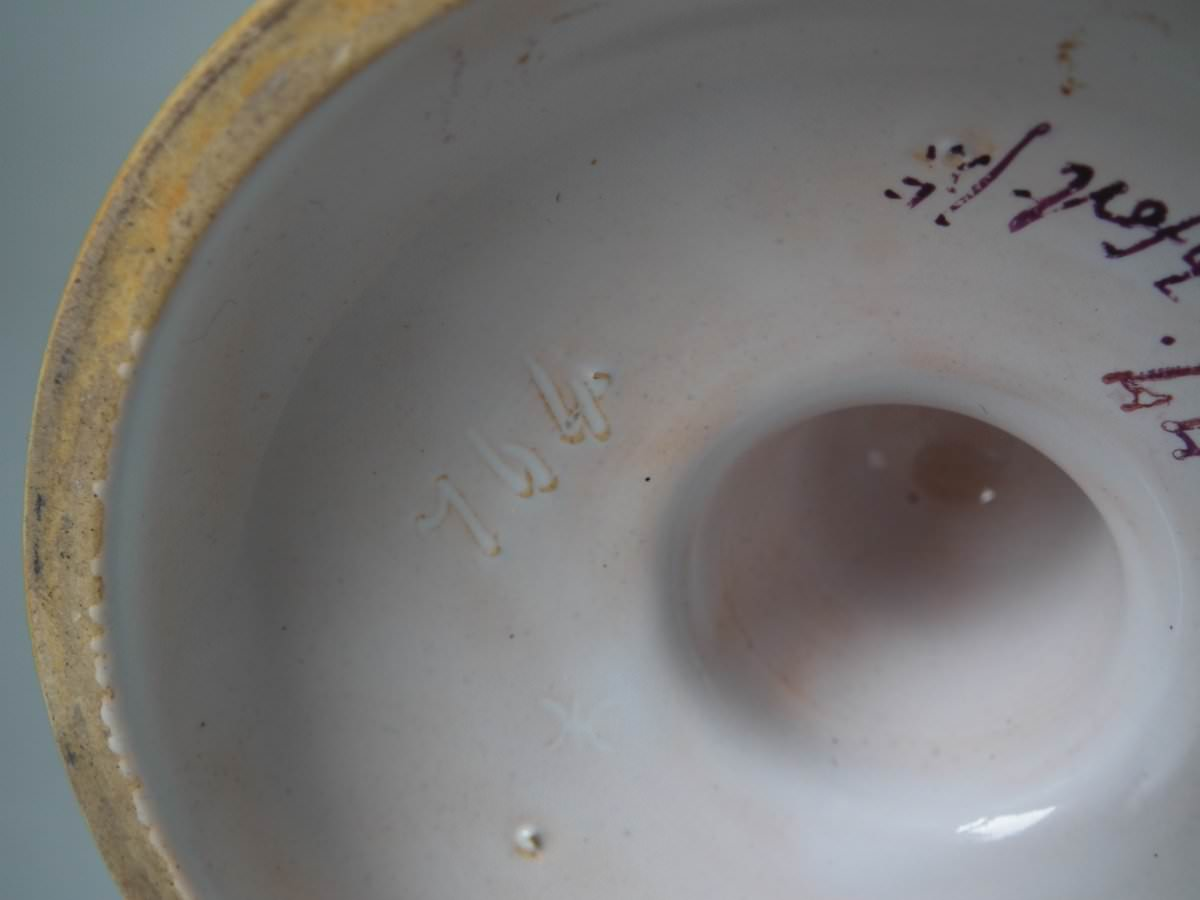
Tin-glazed Minton majolica, date cypher 1864, coated not dipped, opaque white glaze, brush-painted Rochford signature (artist).

== Collectors of majolica ==
Famous collectors of majolica include William Randolph Hearst, Mortimer L. Schiff, Alfred Pringsheim, Robert Strauss, and Robert Lehman.

== In contemporary fiction ==
- The Majolica Murders by Deborah Morgan

== See also ==
- Lustreware
- Talavera de la Reina pottery
- Tin-glazing
- Victorian majolica

== General and cited references ==
- Arnoux, Leon, British Manufacturing Industries, Gutenberg, 1877.
- Atterbury, Paul, and Batkin, Maureen, Dictionary of Minton, Antique Collectors' Club, 1990.
