= Stilt (ceramics) =

Support for firing glazed ceramics

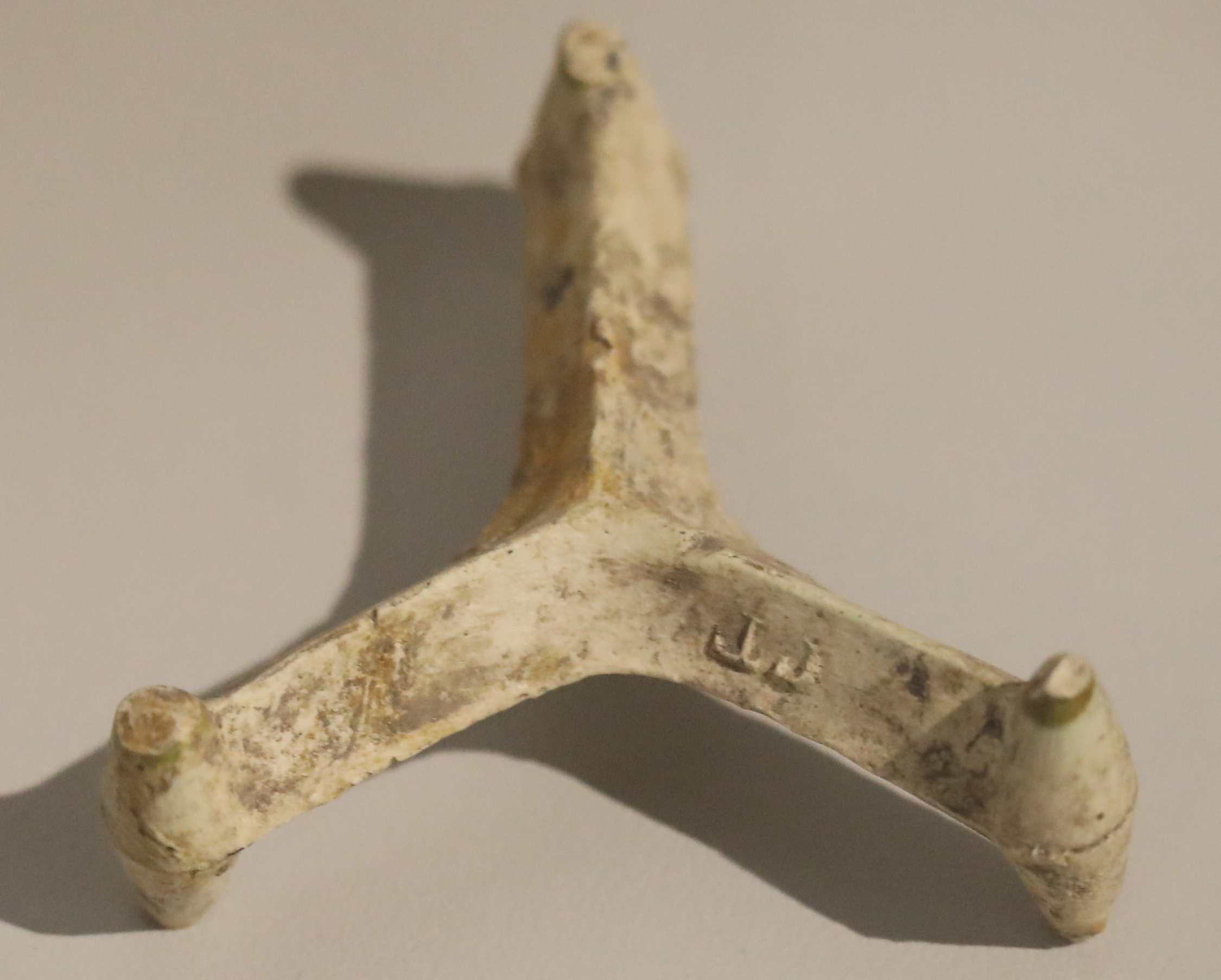
A tripod stilt found at the site of Linthorpe Art Pottery

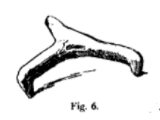
Tripod pernette (an archaeological find). Placed into a kiln upside down with respect to the drawing

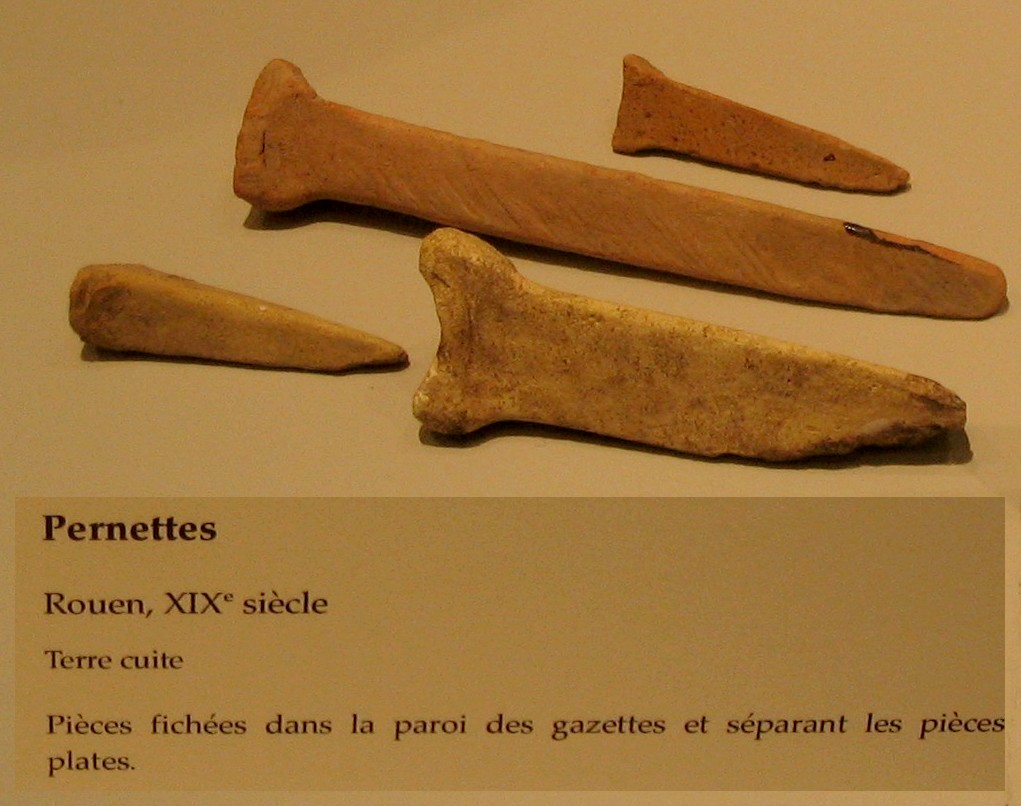
Pernettes stuck in the walls of the saggars to separate flat pieces

Stilts are small supports used when firing glazed ceramics to stop the melting glaze from fusing them to each other or the kiln. Stilts are a form of kiln furniture. Their presence in archaeological sites, where they may be known as pernette, along with other kiln furniture such as saggars and kiln bars can be used to support a case for local production. Some potters avoid the need for stilts by not glazing the bottom of their products. This is known as dry footing.

== History ==
Various types of stilts have been developed over the centuries:

=== Tripod stilt ===
The tripod stilt, which has three legs with a raised point on each end, appears to have been developed in China at least as far back as the third century AD. Tripod stilts have been found during excavations in Ur.

It was adopted by the Islamic world in the 9th century AD and was later adopted by the Byzantines around the start of the 13th century. The use of this stilt can be deduced from damage to the glaze where the three raised points were in direct contact with it. A similar type of stilt appears to have been used in the Staffordshire area and perhaps Scotland between the 1760s and 1850s.

=== Ring stilt ===
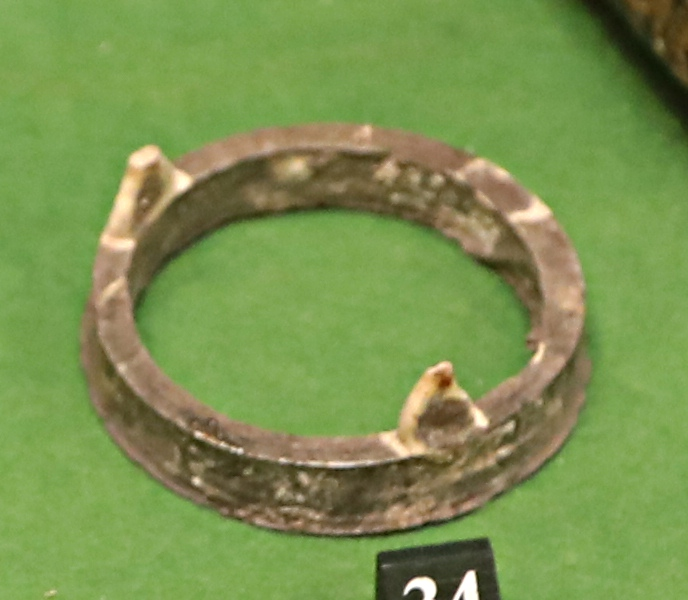
A slightly damaged ring stilt

Ring stilts, which consist of a ring with three raised points of clay placed at equal distances around the rim, were in use in the second half of the 18th century.

=== Crown stilt ===
Crown stilts were in use during much the same time period as ring stilts.

=== Other types ===
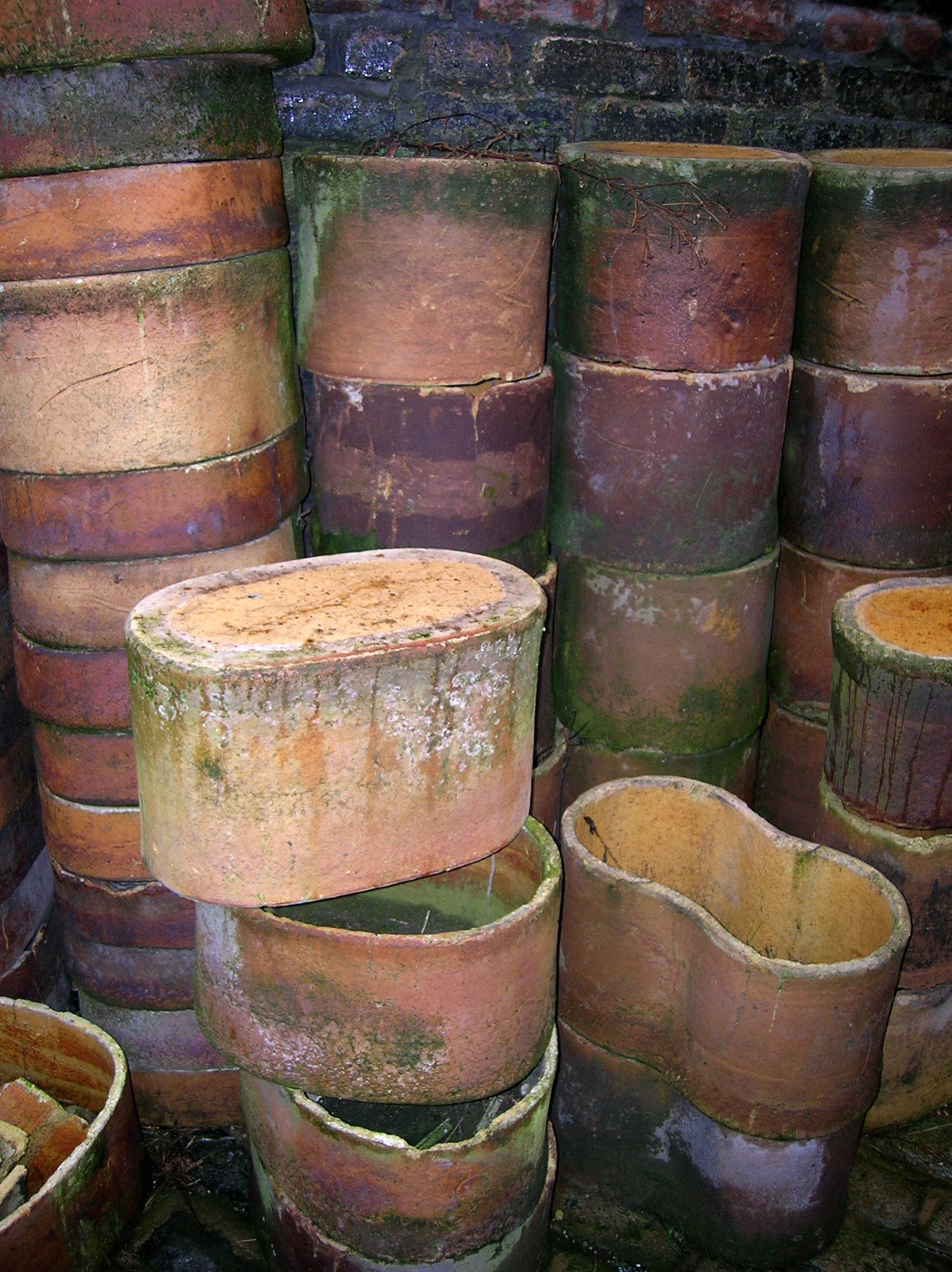
Saggars in the Gladstone Pottery Museum

A stilt has been found at a Roman kiln site near Holt, Wrexham County Borough dating to around the first or second century AD. It was designed to be used within a saggar and has clay pads supporting it within the saggar.

== Archaeology ==
In archaeology, they may be upside-down baked clay tripods, leaving characteristic marks at the bottoms of the pottery/porcelain. They expose the bottom of the fired piece to the full heat and prevent the pieces from sticking to each other.

== Manufacture ==
In the 19th century centralised industrial production of molded three-arm stilts began common in the UK with Staffordshire exporting them to other parts of the country. Some of the manufactures appear to have used distinctive mold designs.

Stilts are still used and produced today and are marketed by pottery suppliers.

== Non-pottery uses ==
Some researchers have used kiln stilts as a settlement substrate for coral larva including those of the species Dendrogyra cylindrus.
