= Saggar =

Type of kiln furniture

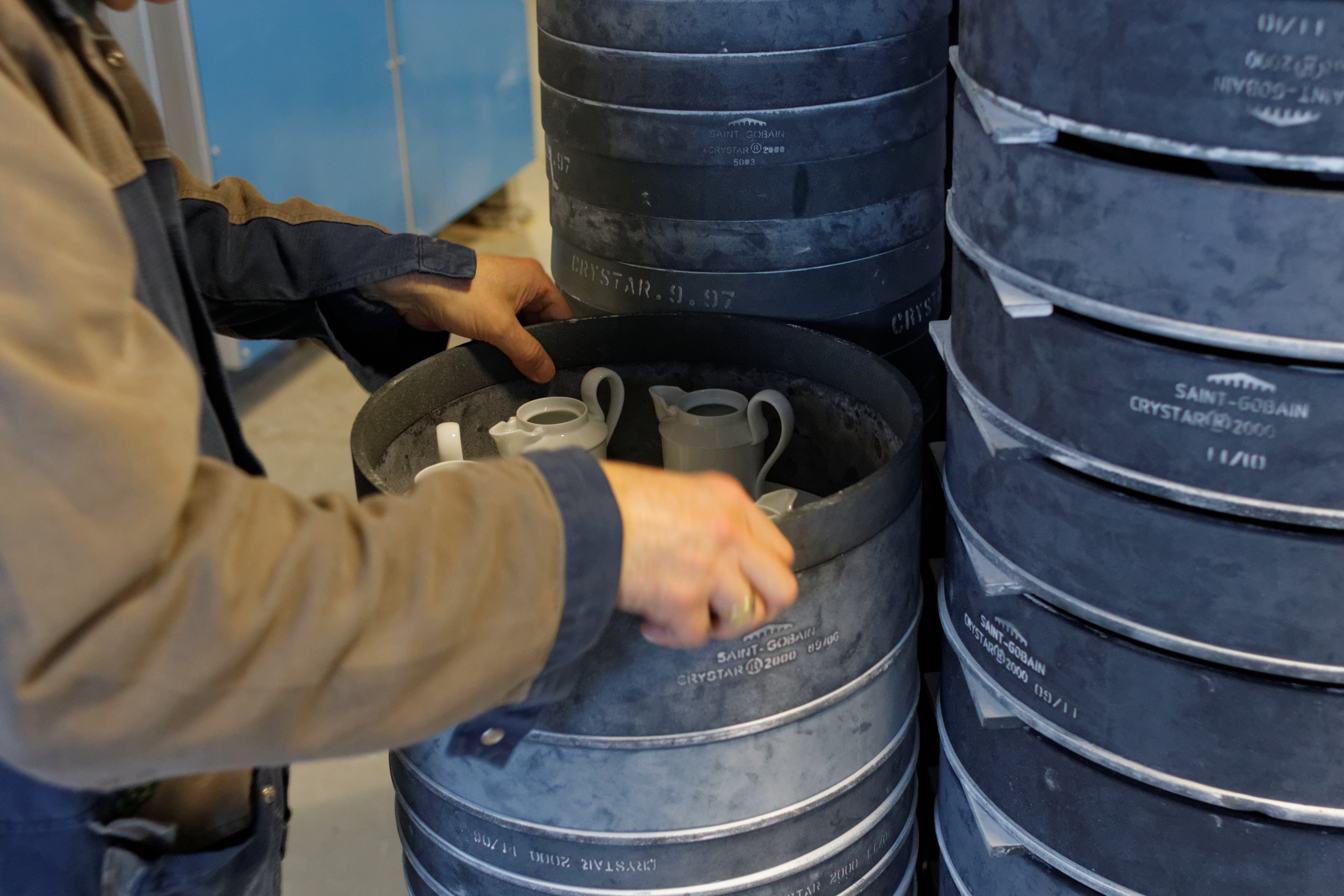
Saggars in use in the Manufacture nationale de Sèvres

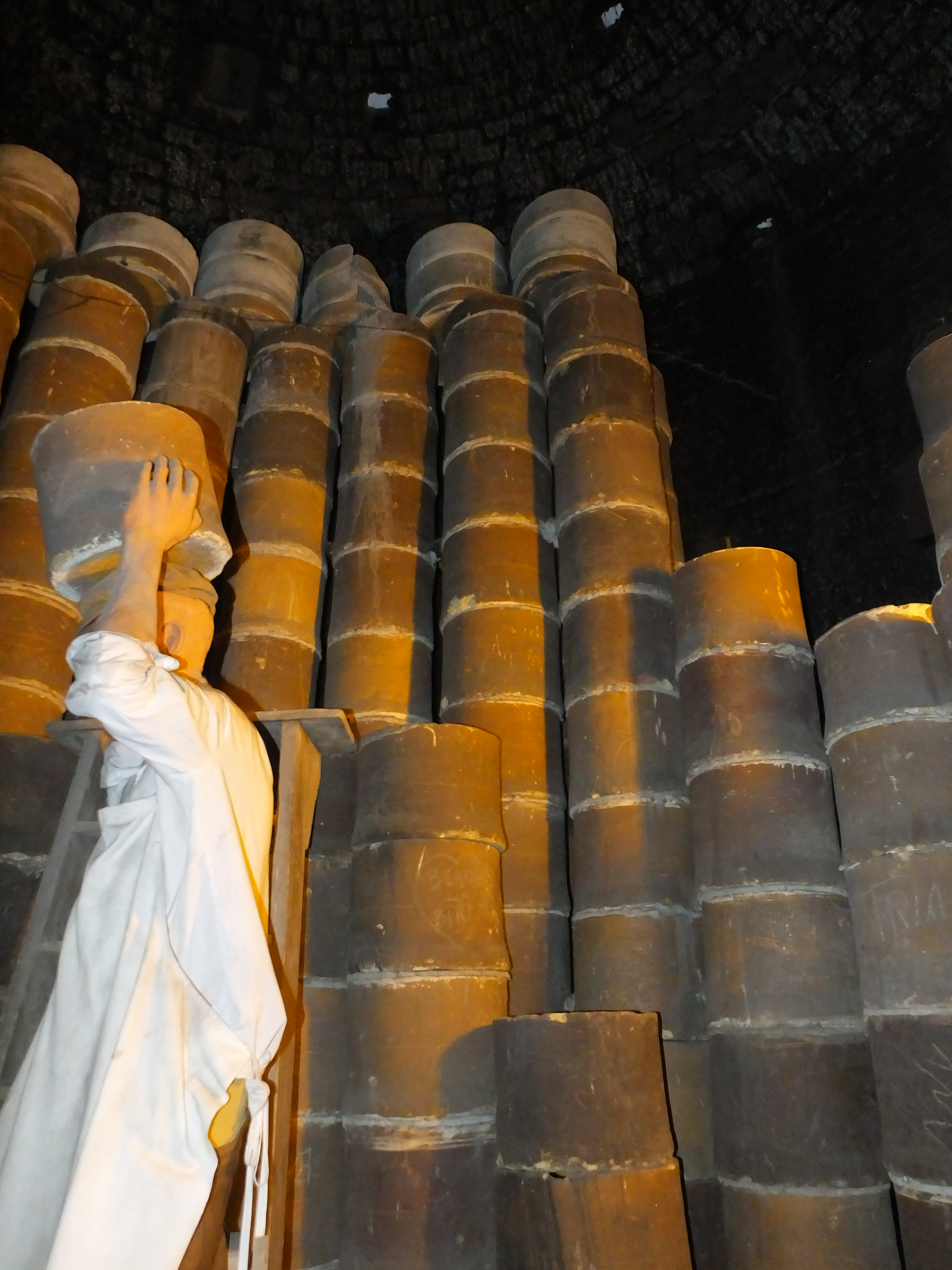
Bungs of saggars inside a bottle kiln

A saggar (also misspelled as sagger or segger) is a type of kiln furniture. It is a ceramic boxlike container used in the firing of pottery to enclose or protect ware being fired inside a kiln. The name may be a contraction of the word safeguard.

Saggars are still used in the production of ceramics to shield ware from the direct contact of flames and from damage by kiln debris.

Traditionally, saggars were made primarily from fireclay. Saggars have been used to protect, or safeguard, ware from open flame, smoke, gases and kiln debris: Modern saggars are made of alumina ceramic, cordierite ceramic, mullite ceramic, silicon carbide and in special cases from zirconia.

== Contemporary use ==
In industrial and technical ceramics, modern saggars serve as precision-engineered controlled environments rather than simple protective boxes. Their production is a highly specialised branch of materials science, focussing on chemical purity and extreme thermal stability to facilitate the sintering of components used in aerospace, telecommunications and high-performance engineering.

=== Precision sintering and contamination control ===
In the production of technical ceramics such as zirconia, alumina and silicon nitride, the saggar functions as a clean-room in miniature. At the molecular level, these ceramics are hypersensitive to vapour-phase contaminants. Modern saggars are manufactured to be chemically inert, ensuring that no elements from the kiln’s heating elements or refractory lining—such as iron, silica or alkalis—leach into the technical components. For the manufacturing of phosphors used in high-end optical sensors and LEDs, saggars are often lined with high-purity alumina or even platinum to prevent even parts-per-million contamination that would ruin the material's refractive properties. In some ultra-high purity applications, the saggar itself may be composed of yttria to prevent any reaction with rare-earth doped ceramics during high-temperature processing.

=== Surface protection of whiteware ceramics ===
While advanced applications exist, saggars remain indispensable in the high-volume production of modern whiteware, such as fine porcelain, hotel-grade stoneware and sanitaryware. In these industrial settings, the saggar is a precision-engineered tool designed to ensure surface perfection and structural integrity during rapid firing cycles. They are primarily used to create a "micro-environment" that protects the sensitive glaze from the high-velocity air currents found in modern gas-fired shuttle kilns and tunnel kilns. Even in clean environments, the movement of combustion gases can carry minute particles of refractory dust. For high-end whiteware, a single speck of dust landing on a molten glaze results in a "pinhole" or "speck," rendering the piece a second-grade product. Modern saggars are manufactured with low-dusting, high-density surfaces to ensure the interior remains pristine.

=== Structural stability and stack loading ===
Modern whiteware saggars are produced using cordierite-mullite or silicon carbide blends, materials chosen for their high strength-to-weight ratio. Because industrial kilns are optimised for maximum density, saggars are designed to be "self-nesting." This allows manufacturers to stack products vertically without the need for heavy external kiln furniture. By acting as both the protective chamber and the structural support, modern saggars allow for a much higher "setting density," meaning more plates or bowls can be fired in a single cycle using less energy. This is critical for the economic viability of large-scale ceramic factories. The evolution of finite element analysis in design has allowed for the production of saggars with thinner walls that maintain structural integrity under the massive weight of a full kiln stack.

== Production ==
The production of modern saggars has shifted toward high-pressure dry pressing, isostatic pressing and CNC machining. These manufacturing methods ensure that every saggar is dimensionally identical, a necessity for the robotic loading systems used in modern factories. In these facilities, robotic arms must be able to stack and unstack saggars with sub-millimetre precision. Furthermore, many modern saggars feature "labyrinth seals"—interlocking grooves on the lids—that allow for the maintenance of a specific protective atmosphere (such as pure nitrogen or argon) inside the saggar while the kiln itself operates in a different environment. The consistency of the saggar's thermal expansion coefficient is strictly controlled during production to ensure that automated systems can safely handle them even as they transition through varying heat zones in the factory.

== Historic use ==
=== Ming porcelain ===
The manufacturer of saggars in the fifteenth and sixteenth centuries occupied a large proportion of space, labour and material (fuel and clay) at the imperial manufactury, and there were more kilns devoted to creating them than to firing the final product.

=== Staffordshire potbanks ===
By far the largest number of UK pottery manufacturers were based in and around Stoke-on-Trent in a region known as The Potteries. Their businesses, locally known as potbanks, fired their wares in distinctive bottle ovens. At the turn of the twentieth century over 4,000 of these were in use, although by 2014 only 47 survived, all of which are no longer in production but are listed buildings.

The saggars were used for the biscuit and the glost firing. They were expected to last for about 40 firings; each potbank made their own in a saggar making workshop. Saggars were made from fireclay, by a saggar maker and two assistants: the framemaker and the bottom knocker. The framemaker beat the clay into a sheet on a metal table using a large mallet, the mow or mawl. Using a frame he would cut it to size, sprinkle it with sawdust and wrap it around a wooden block to make the walls. The framemaker was usually an apprentice in his late teens. The bottom knocker, usually a boy in his early teens, did the same on a smaller scale, constructing the round or banjo-shaped bottom. Again the mow was used to beat the air out of the clay and flatten the sheet. The saggar maker was an experienced craftsman who paid his assistants out of his piece-work earnings: he took the bottom and the sides onto a wheel and using his thumbs joined the sides to the bottom. The green saggars were dried and then placed on the top of bungs during the next firing of the kiln.

The unfired ceramic ware was placed in saggars on a bed of silica sand or flint dust and then biscuit fired, before being glazed and again placed in saggars separated by kiln furniture prior to being glost fired. Ware may then be decorated, and placed on refractory bats and fired again such as in a muffle kiln.

A saggar maker's bottom knocker was a job title considered sufficiently amusing for it to be featured on the television panel show What's My Line?. Whilst saggar making was a skilled craft, bottom knocking was far less skilled, consisting of beating clay into a metal ring.

== Studio pottery ==
From the twentieth century studio potters have used saggars to create decorative ceramic pieces. In this use saggars are used to create a localised reducing atmosphere, or concentrate the effects of salts, metal oxides and other materials on the surface of their ware.

Some pots may be carefully prepared for saggar firing. One method creates a smooth surface covered with clay slip, terra sigillata, which responds particularly well to the saggar technique. This slip covering may be burnished to achieve a gloss. Prepared pots are nestled into saggars filled with beds of combustible materials, such as sawdust, less combustible organic materials, salts and metals. These materials ignite or fume during firing, leaving the pot buried in layers of fine ash. Ware produced in filled saggars may display dramatic markings, with colours ranging from distinctive black and white markings to flashes of golds, greens and red tones. Porcelain and stoneware are ideal for displaying the surface patterns obtained through saggar firing. In addition to the use of saggars, some studio potters bundle pots and burnable materials within a heavy wrapping of metal foil.

== Saggar clay ==
Saggar clay is a coarse grained fire clay which gets its name from the saggars which it is used to make.
