= Tile crank =

A tile crank is used in a pottery kiln to hold a stack of ceramic tiles apart while they are fired. This allows multiple tiles to be fired at once under uniform heating. Ledges on either side of the tile crank are tilted upwards so as to only touch the unglazed back of the tile, allowing the edge of the tile to be glazed.
