= Fire clay =

Refractory clays used in ceramics manufacturing

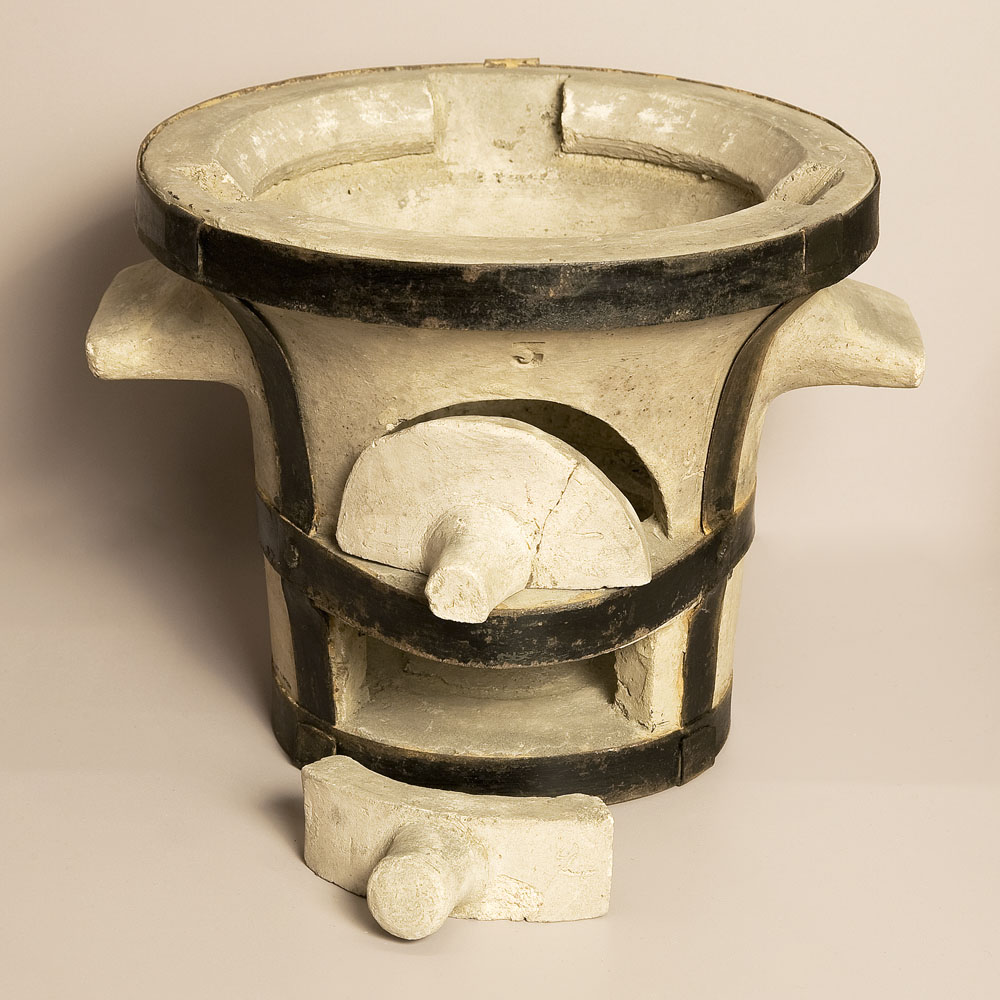
Fire clay furnace

Fire clay is a range of refractory clays used in the manufacture of ceramics, especially fire brick. The United States Environmental Protection Agency defines fire clay very generally as a "mineral aggregate composed of hydrous silicates of aluminium (Al_{2}O_{3}·2SiO_{2}·2H_{2}O) with or without free silica."

== Properties ==
High-grade fire clays can withstand temperatures of 1,775 °C (3,227 °F), but to be referred to as a "fire clay" the material must withstand a minimum temperature of 1,515 °C (2,759 °F). Fire clays range from flint clays to plastic fire clays, but there are semi-flint and semi-plastic fire clays as well. Fire clays consist of natural argillaceous materials, mostly kaolinite group clays, along with fine-grained micas and quartz, and may also contain organic matter and sulphur compounds.

Fire clay is resistant to high temperatures, having fusion points higher than 1,600 °C (2,910 °F); therefore it is suitable for lining furnaces, as fire brick, and for manufacture of utensils used in the metalworking industries, such as crucibles, saggars, retorts, and glassware. Its stability during firing in the kiln means that it can be used to make complex items of pottery such as pipes and sanitary ware.

== Chemical composition ==
The chemical composition typical for fire clays are 23-34% Al_{2}O_{3}, 50-60% SiO_{2}, 6-27% ignition loss and various amounts of Fe_{2}O_{3}, CaO, MgO, K_{2}O, Na_{2}O, and TiO_{2}. Chemical analyses from two 19th-century sources, shown in table below, are somewhat lower in alumina although a more contemporary source quotes analyses that are closer.

Fire clay compositions
	Thorpe			King			Shackelford
	Stonebridge	Eisenberg I	Eisenberg II	Newcastle 1	Newcastle 2	Newcastle 3	N/A
SiO_{2} (%)	65.10	89.8	64.7	51.1	47.6	48.6	58.1
Al_{2}O_{3} (%)	22.2	5.40	24.0	31.4	29.5	30.2	23.1
MgO (%)	0.18	0.09	0.40	1.54	0.71	1.91	1.00
CaO(%)	0.14	0.20	0.37	1.46	1.34	1.66	0.08
Iron Oxides (%)	0.18	0.09	0.40	4.63	9.13	4.06	2.40
K_{2}O (%)	0.18	0.61	2.40	not given in the text			

== Extraction ==
Unlike conventional brick-making clay, some fire clays (especially flint clays) are mined at depth, found as a seatearth, the underclay associated with coal measures. Though many are extracted through open pit methods. Many fireclay deposits are associated with coal even if the seam is small and of low quality but not all fire clays form around coal. While many commercial mines focus on huge deposits sometimes spanning hundreds of miles wide and meters thick found in sedimentary rocks associated with coals, formed by primary clay that has been eroded and transported downstream in a somewhat pure form or has been chemically weathered after deposition(from ground water itself or from the organic acids from said coal). These deposits are similar to ball clay deposits in every way except iron content, particle size, and fired color. Although smaller deposits occur in innumerable spots across almost every U.S. state, as well as every country, these can occur as primary clay deposits from chemical weathering, much like kaolin deposits but from parent rocks with more iron. More commonly they occur in a wide variety of sedimentary rocks and can vary quite differently in terms of plasticity, color, sand content, and mineral content and can be found next to or within meters of clays of other or similar types. Many of these deposits were abandoned during the turn of the 20th century and lay abandoned still or covered by development.
