= Potbank =

Colloquial name of a pottery factory

A potbank is a colloquial name for a pottery factory in north Staffordshire used to make bone china, earthenware and sanitaryware.

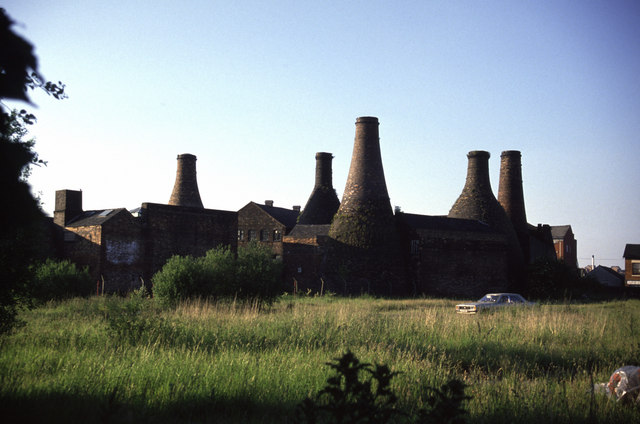
The Gladstone Pottery Museum

== Etymology ==
The term potbank has been used for generations; traditionally it is believed to originate in a business strategy employed by Josiah Wedgwood, the famous early industrialist. Unable to meet the demand for his creamwares, he sub-contracted other potters to make shapes to his specification, and to hold these in stocks until he required them. Their warehouses were called banks, and the word "potbank" is thought to derive from the practice.

== Process ==
The raw materials of pottery include clay, quartz and feldspar. These are mixed sieved and filtered to make slip, which is pressed to make a workable body. Bowls are jolleyed on a wheel, plates are jiggered on a wheel and fancies moulded in plaster moulds. This greenware is dried, and placed into saggars which are stacked into a bottle oven for the first or biscuit) firing at 1,000C. The resulting "biscuit ware" can be decorated with an underglaze transfer and coated with a glaze. These are then placed in a saggar with kiln furniture thimbles to separate them and fired for a second time, the glost firing can be up to 1,400C, in another bottle oven. Depending on ware, the item could be decorated and gilded by hand and be fired for a third time in a muffle kiln at 1,250.

== Stoke-on-Trent ==
The six towns of the Potteries were the centre of the ceramic industry in the United Kingdom. The Trent and Mersey Canal which opened in 1777 provided cheap transport for the china clay from Cornwall, the bones and the coal from local collieries, and a smooth passage to Liverpool to export the finished goods.

== Occupational diseases ==
- Potter's rot
- Lead poisoning

== Preservation ==
There are 46 standing bottle ovens in Stoke-on-Trent, all now listed buildings. Bottle ovens can be seen at the Gladstone Pottery Museum, Burleigh Pottery and the Ironbridge Gorge Museum.

== See also ==
- Gladstone Pottery Museum
- Bottle oven

== Bibliography ==
- Copeland, Robert (2009). Manufacturing Processes of Tableware during the Eighteenth and Nineteenth Centuries. Northern Ceramic Society. ISBN 978-0-9563159-0-8.
- Woolliscroft, Terry (2014). "Potbank Dictionary". www.woolliscroft.org.uk.
