= Monastery of Santa Maria de las Cuevas =

Religious building on the Isla de La Cartuja in Spain

Monasterio de Santa María de las Cuevas Monastery of Our Lady of the Caves
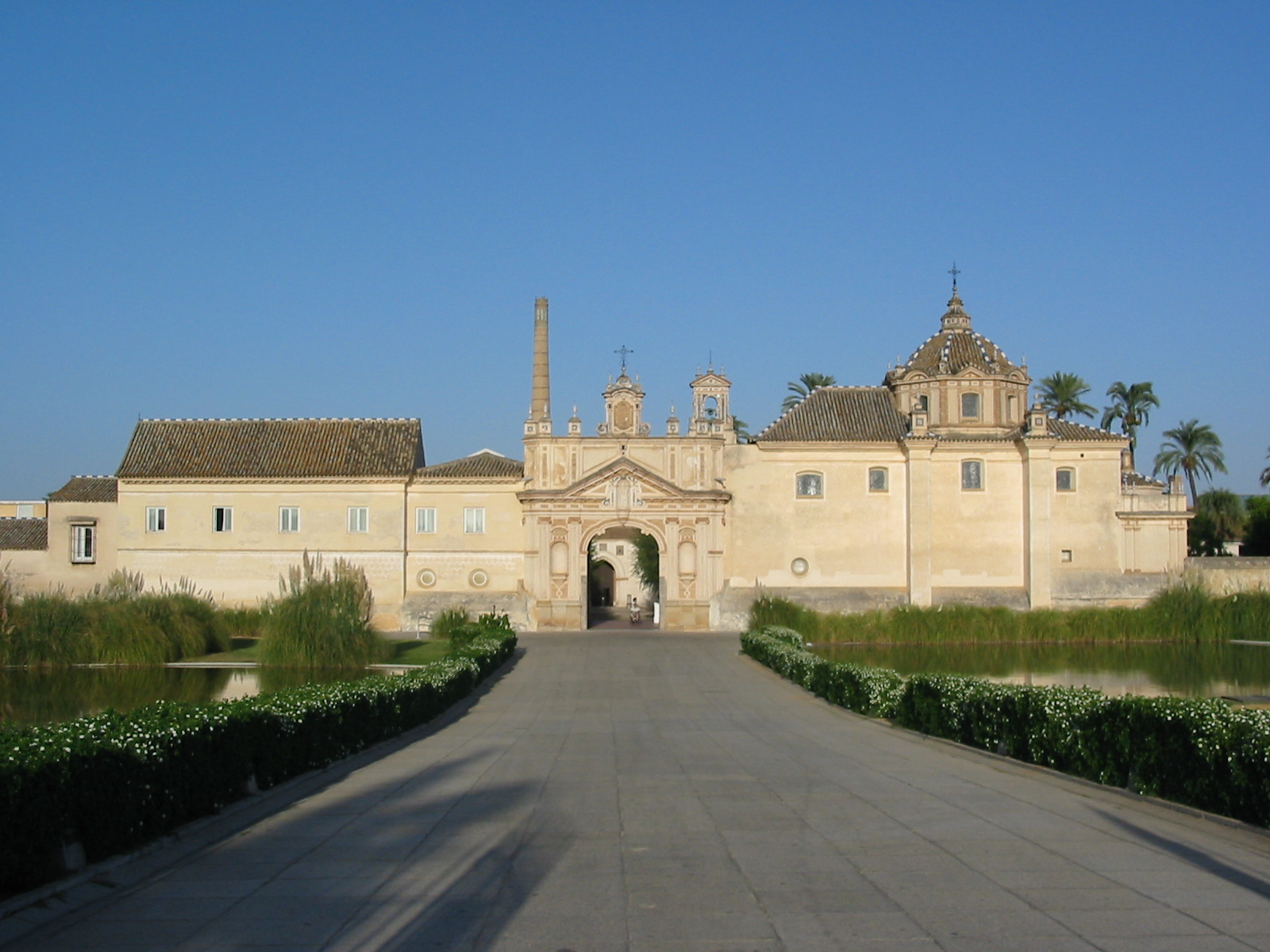
- Monastery of the Cartuja

Religion
- Affiliation: Secularized
- Status: CAAC (Andalusian Center of Contemporary Arts)

Location
- Location: Seville, Andalusia, Spain
- Interactive map of Monasterio de Santa María de las Cuevas; Monastery of Our Lady of the Caves
- Coordinates: 37°23′55″N 6°0′32″W

Architecture
- Type: Monastery
- Style: Mudéjar-Gothic-Reinaissance-Baroque

Website
- www.caac.es

The Monastery of Santa María de las Cuevas, also known as the Monastery of the Cartuja (Charterhouse), is a religious building on the Isla de La Cartuja in Seville, southern Spain. The Andalusian Contemporary Art Center (The Centro Andaluz de Arte Contemporáneo (CAAC)) is now located on this site.

== History ==
=== Monastery ===
Legend holds that the area, in Moorish times, was honeycombed with caves made by potters for ovens and to obtain clay, and that after the capture of the city by Christians in the thirteenth century, an image of the virgin was revealed inside one of the caves, where supposedly it had been hidden. It prompted the construction of a chapel of Santa María de las Cuevas to house the venerated icon. In the 15th century, the archbishop of Seville, aided by the noble family of Medina, helped found a Franciscan monastery at the site. Later constructions were patronized by don Perafán de Ribera (who built the Casa de Pilatos). In the 15th century, monks of the cloistered order of Saint Bruno were housed in the monastery.

Christopher Columbus' remains were first interred at Valladolid, then at the Monastery of the Cartuja by the will of his son Diego. In 1542 the remains were transferred to Colonial Santo Domingo.

During the Napoleonic invasion, the monastery was sacked and used as barracks. After returning in 1812, the monastery was finally vacated with the general closure of monasteries in 1835–36 (Desamortización de Mendizábal).

=== Ceramics Factory ===
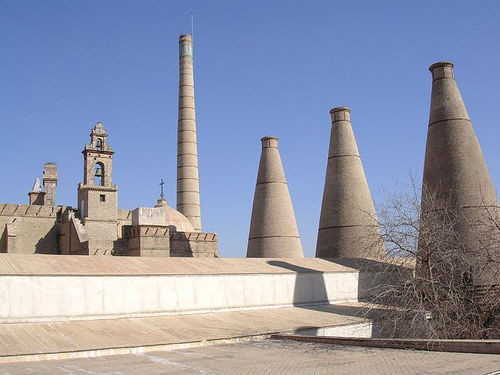
Monastery of Santa María de las Cuevas The chimney and bottle shaped kilns are the remnants of the ceramics factory

Following the confiscation of church property decreed by Juan Alvarez Mendizabal, Englishman Charles Pickman (1808–1883), acquired the Carthusian Monastery of Santa Maria de las Cuevas in 1839. Commencing production in 1841, Pickman established innovative manufacturing methods such as importing raw materials, the use of molds, using specialised machinery, mechanical arms and presses, utilising British ceramist experience while employing pottery workers from nearby Triana. The initial success of the factory led to La Cartuja de Sevilla becoming one of the most popular brands in Europe and in Latin American countries.

La Cartuja de Sevilla received numerous awards in international exhibitions: Paris (1856, 1867 and 1878), London (1862), Porto (1865), Vienna (1872), Seville (1858, 1929 and 1949), Barcelona (1888), Bayonne (1864), Philadelphia (1876), and in 1871 was named Provider of the Royal House of Spain by Amadeo I of Savoy who later granted the title of Marquis of Pickman founder of La Cartuja de Sevilla. Charles Pickman is also distinguished by his admission to the Most Noble Order of the British Garter, which is used as a trademark in some models from the factory.

Production continued until 1984. The bottle shaped kilns and tall chimney are the legacy of the ceramics factory.

=== National Monument and museum of contemporary art ===
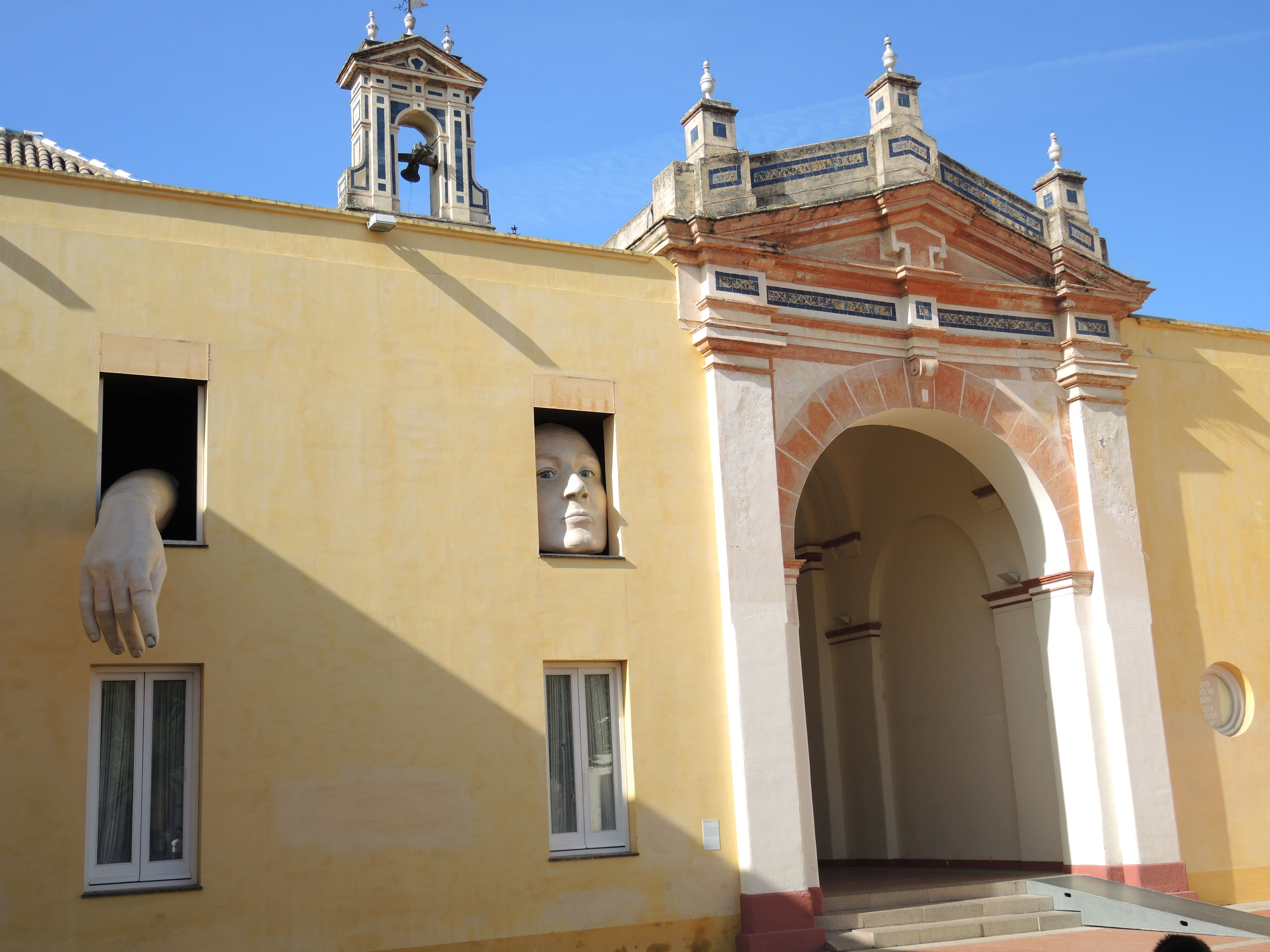
Inside the entrance gateway

In 1964, the monastery was declared a national monument, and now is owned by the government of Andalusia, which created a new institution called "Monumental Ensemble of the Monastery of Santa María de las Cuevas". Restorations were made for the Seville Expo '92, directed by Bartolomé Ruiz González, the first and only one director of the Monumental Ensemble from 1989 to 1994. In 1997, the older part of the monastery became the site of a museum of contemporary art, the Centro Andaluz de Arte Contemporáneo (CAAC).

== The Centro Andaluz de Arte Contemporáneo (CAAC) ==
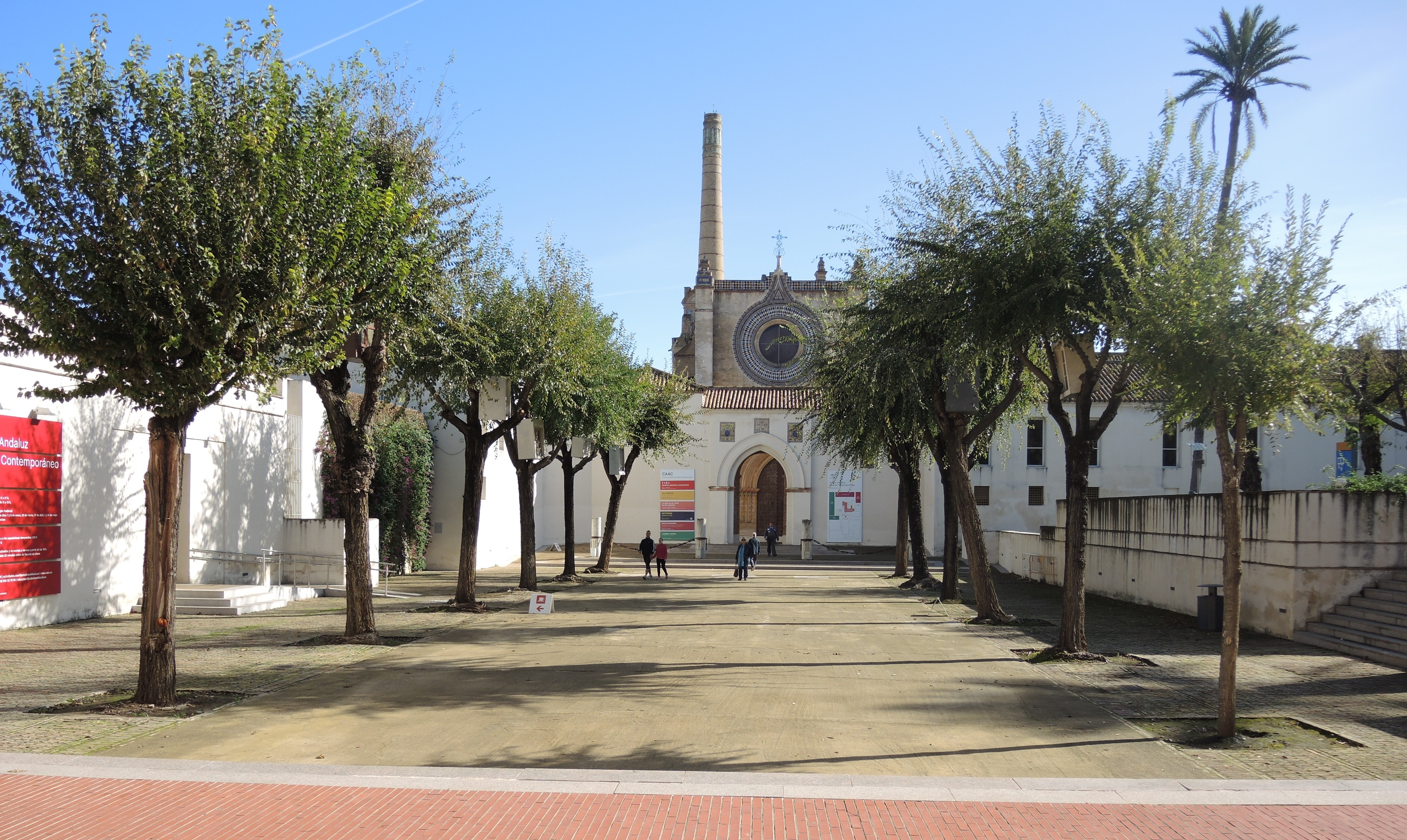
Approach through courtyard

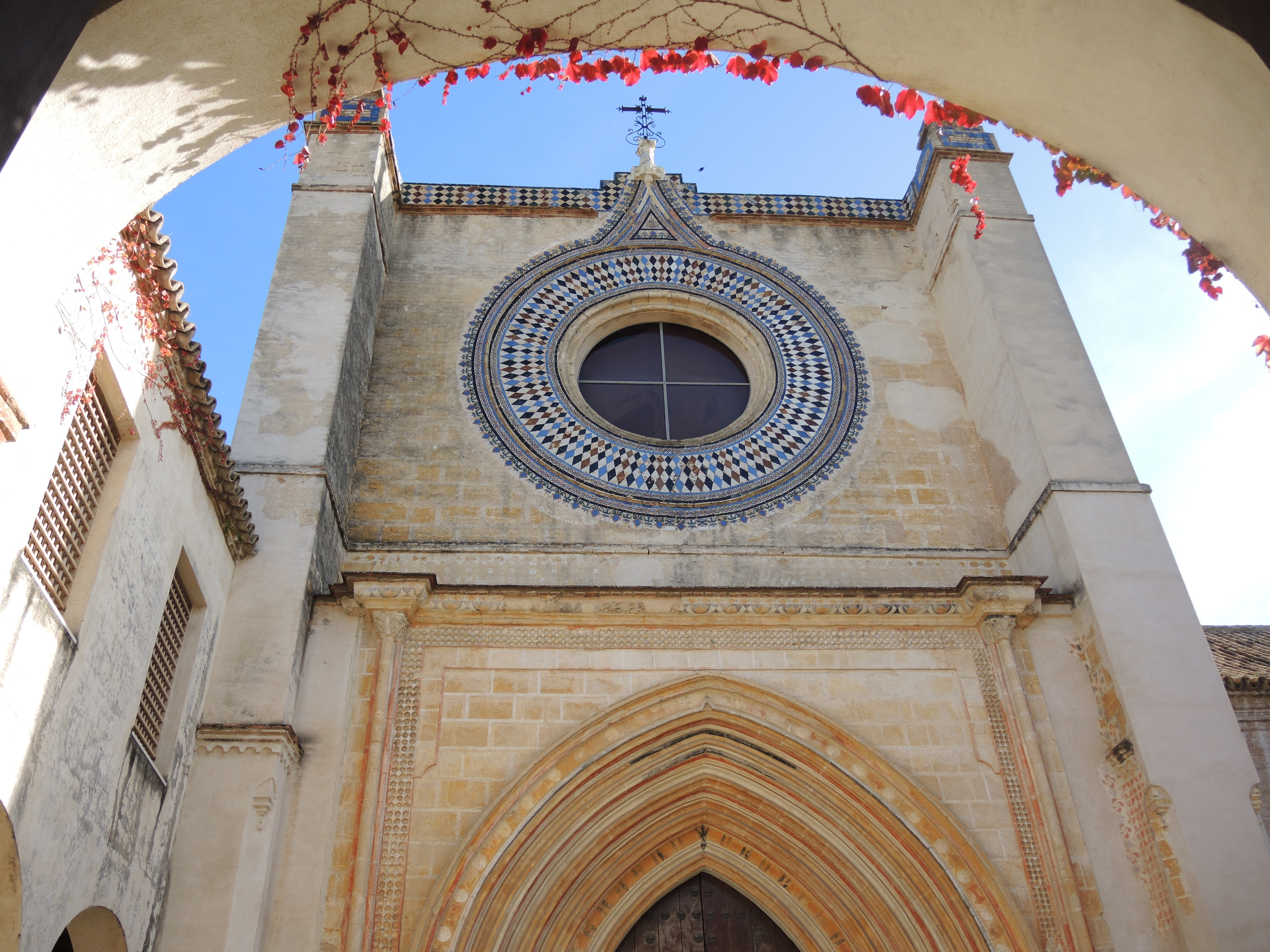
Rose window to chapel

The Centro Andaluz de Arte Contemporáneo (CAAC) was created in February 1990 with the aim of giving the local community an institution for the research, conservation and promotion of contemporary art. In 1997 the Cartuja Monastery became the centre's headquarters. The CAAC, an autonomous organisation dependent on the Andalusian Government (Junta de Andalucía), took over the collections of the former Conjunto Monumental de la Cartuja (Cartuja Monument Centre) and the Museo de Arte Contemporáneo de Sevilla (Contemporary Art Museum of Seville).

One of the main aims of the centre has been to develop a programme of activities attempting to promote the study of contemporary international artistic creation in all its facets. Temporary exhibitions, seminars, workshops, concerts, meetings, recitals, film cycles and lectures have been the communication tools used to fulfil this aim.

The permanent collection includes pieces by Luis Gordillo, Candida Hofer, Rebecca Horn, Pablo Palazuelo, Joseph Kosuth and Louise Bourgeois. It focuses in particular on the history of contemporary Andalusian creativity and its relationship with other national and international artistic contexts. Since 1994 the centre has organised a series of themed exhibitions relating to different aspects of the Monastery in which pieces from its archives address relevant events in contemporary aesthetic creation.

Visitors to the museum may also see the historical grounds of the former monastery which includes the old chain door, atrium, chapels of Santa Catalina, San Bruno, Santa Ana, Profundis and la Magdalena, the priory cell, church, the sacristy, cloisters, monks' chapter, refectory, gardens and orchards.
