= Burleigh Pottery =

British pottery manufacturer

- Type: Private limited company
- Industry: Pottery
- Predecessor: Hulme and Booth
- Founded: 1851
- Founder: F R Burgess & W Leigh
- Headquarters: Middleport, Stoke-on-Trent, England
- Area served: Worldwide
- Key people: William Leigh & Frederick Rathbone Burgess (founders), Edmund Leigh (chairman)
- Products: Earthenware pottery
- Owner: Denby Pottery Company
- Number of employees: Unknown
- Website: www.burleigh.co.uk

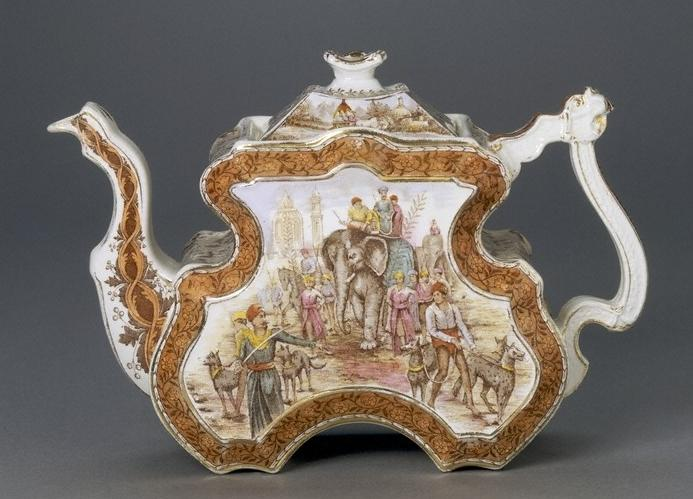
Teapot, 1896, Burgess & Leigh, V&A Museum

Burleigh Pottery (also known as Burgess & Leigh) is the name of a pottery manufacturer in Middleport, Stoke-on-Trent. The business specialises in traditionally decorated earthenware tableware.

The factory is a nineteenth-century Grade II* listed buildings known as the Middleport Pottery. In addition production facilities at site, which is next to the Trent and Mersey Canal, has a visitor centre and a factory shop.

== History ==
The business was established in 1851 at the Central Pottery in Burslem as Hulme and Booth. The pottery was taken over in 1862 by William Leigh and Frederick Rathbone Burgess, and traded from that date as Burgess & Leigh. The trademark "Burleigh", used from the 1930s, is a combination of the two names.

Burgess and Leigh moved to different works, first in 1868 to the Hill Pottery in Burslem and then in 1889 to the present factory at Middleport, regarded at the time of its construction as a model pottery. Its scale and linear organisation contrast with the constricted sites and haphazard layout of traditional potteries such as the Gladstone Pottery Museum.

In 1887 Davenport Pottery was acquired. It was of interest in part for its moulds. Burleigh retains a notable collection of historic moulds which are still used.

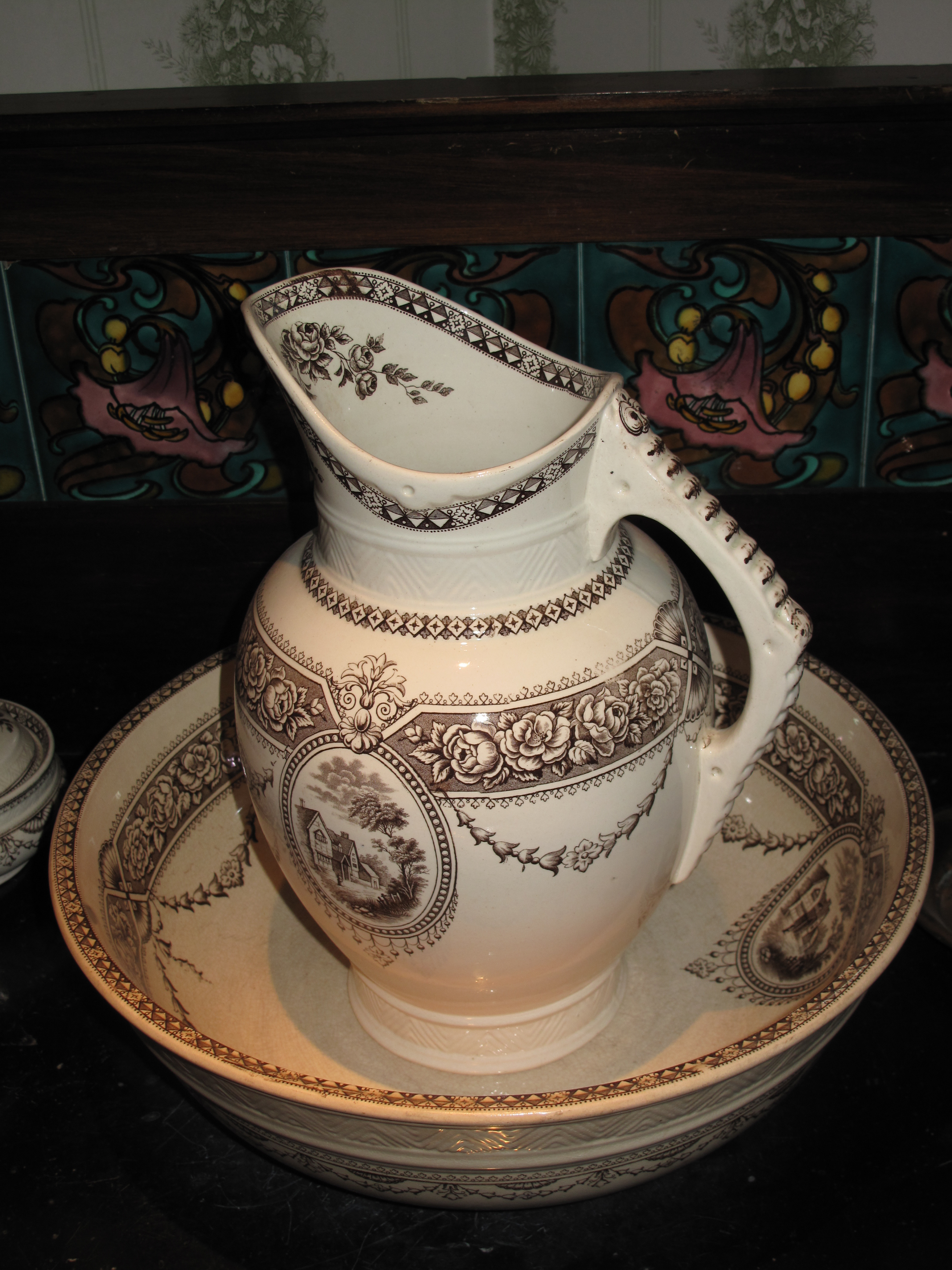
Wash basin & jug

Leigh and Burgess died in 1889 and 1895 respectively, and were succeeded by their sons, Edmund Leigh and Richard Burgess. On Richard's death in 1912, the business passed entirely into the ownership of the Leigh family. In 1919 it became private limited company, Burgess & Leigh Limited.

The years between the wars are often regarded as the company's "golden age", with a number of extremely talented designers and artists such as Harold Bennett, Charles Wilkes and Ernest Baily. Perhaps the best known was Charlotte Rhead, who worked here between 1926 and 1931, noted particularly for her work in tubelining. By 1939, the factory was employing over 500 people.

From as early as 1987 the company developed a thriving export network, concentrating primarily on the Empire (later Commonwealth) and American markets, but later also focussing on Europe.

After a run of financial difficulties, the company was sold in 1999 to Rosemary and William Dorling, and traded as Burgess Dorling & Leigh. In 2010 it was acquired by Denby Holdings Ltd, the parent company of Denby Pottery.

== Conservation status ==
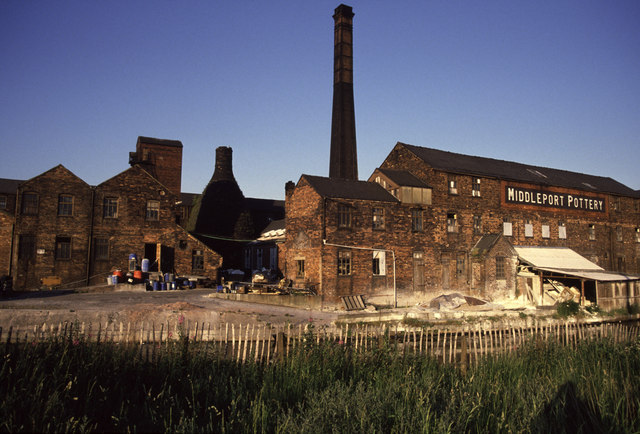
Middleport Pottery, Burslem

The Middleport Pottery was listed in the 1970s. By this time six of the seven bottle ovens on the site had been demolished. The surviving bottle oven was given its own listing. In 1988 the course of the Trent and Mersey Canal through Stoke-on-Trent was designated a linear Conservation Area.

=== Decline ===
English Heritage put the canal Conservation Area on the "Conservation Areas at Risk" Register in 2010, in large part because of urban decay caused by the decline of traditional industries. A 2011 review of the Conservation Area noted that the Middleport Pottery was a building at risk.

=== Restoration ===
The Prince's Regeneration Trust offered to renovate the buildings, allowing their continued use as a working pottery. The project involved a sale and lease-back deal via the United Kingdom Historic Building Preservation Trust (UKHBPT). In 2014 Prince Charles visited the pottery to open a visitor centre.

== Media appearances ==
The factory was the location for four series of The Great Pottery Throw Down, and was featured in an episode of Peaky Blinders.

== Bibliography ==
- Historic England. "Middleport Pottery (Burgess and Leigh) (Grade II*) (1297939)". National Heritage List for England.
- Mckeown, Julie, 2003. "Burleigh: The Story of a Pottery". Richard Dennis. ISBN 0-903685-80-9
