= Wetheriggs Pottery =

Pottery in Clifton, Cumbria, England

Coordinates: 54.629723°N 2.690814°W

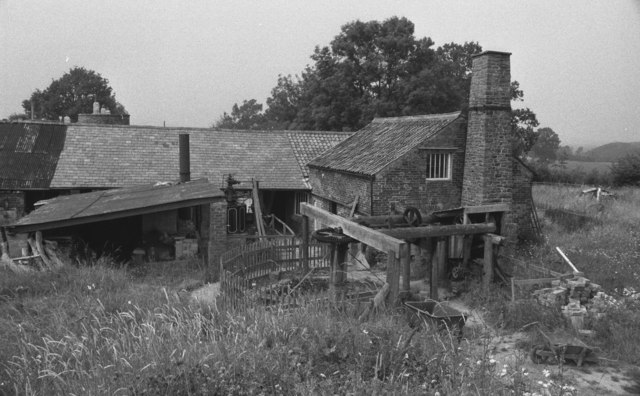
The pottery in 1983, prior to renovation

Wetheriggs Pottery is a former pottery on the C3047 road, east of the hamlet of Clifton Dykes, in Clifton, Cumbria, 5 miles (8.0 km) southeast of Penrith in England. It opened in the mid 19th century providing farm and housewares for local consumption; later the business diversified into craft pottery. The property is Grade II listed.

== History ==
The pottery developed on a site belonging to the Brougham estate. Its beginnings can be traced to 1855 when local clay from Clifton Dykes was used for the production of bricks, tiles and pipes. Production of pottery began in 1860 when John Schofield and Margaret Thorburn moved to the site from Stepney Bank Pottery in Newcastle. John Schofield died in 1917, and Margaret Thorburn in 1937. The pottery remained in the Schofield and Thorburn family's hands until 1973. It was given Ancient Monument status in 1973.

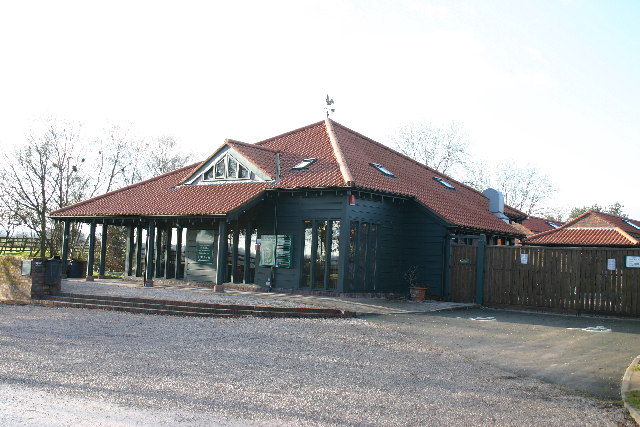
Wetheriggs Pottery visitor centre, now demolished

The enterprise was provided with fuel (coal) via a siding from the Eden Valley railway line. When the railway closed in 1962, the pottery kiln fell out of use. The beehive kiln remains, as does a blunger for preparing suitable clay. The steam engine used to drive the pottery machinery was restored in the 1990s by Fred Dibnah.

Pottery making was revived at Wetheriggs, as the only remaining steam-powered pottery in the country. Jonathan and Dorothy Snell took over the pottery and continued the production of slip decorated earthenware for a number of years, training and employing a number of potters who went on to set up their own potteries. Mary Chappelhow became the master potter at Wetheriggs in 2003. Production has since ceased at the site, and Chappelhow moved her studio to Brougham Hall.

From 2006 to 2014 Wetheriggs Zoo and Animal Sanctuary operated on the site until it moved to another location.

In 2016, a developer was seeking planning permission to reopen the site as a holiday village. The application included:

"The kiln, workshops, drying shed, kiln room, steam house and blunger are Grade II listed. The old kiln and existing clay pit are recognised as scheduled monuments. Although these historic buildings are in a relatively dilapidated state, it is considered these make a positive contribution to the area and would benefit vastly from upheaval and restoration back to their original character."

In 2020, Eden District Council approved a plan for conversion to a dwelling, granting "Listed Building Consent for the redevelopment of the beehive kiln, associated drying sheds, workshops and engine room to a dwelling and the demolition of adjoining buildings and structures".

== See also ==
- Listed buildings in Clifton, Cumbria
