= William Boulton (engineer) =

William Boulton (1825-1900) was an engineer in Burslem, Staffordshire. He was an inventor with many patents and played an important role in the mechanisation of the pottery industry. He was an alderman, Chief Bailiff of Burslem in 1875 and on two occasions Mayor of Burslem (1881 and 1892), and a Justice of the Peace.

== Family history ==
Boulton was born in Seabridge, Staffordshire in 1825 to Thomas and Hanna Boulton. He was married three times, his first wife was most likely Emma Barker married 31st Dec 1853, his second wife was Elizabeth Arrowsmith (1832-1868) who he married at Wolstanton in Dec 1856, and his third wife was Mary Dunning (1844-1920) who he married in Wolstanton in June 1870.

He was an apprentice engineer in Madeley, and later moved to Burslem where he started in business with a Mr Brough, before creating his own company. He was a Wesleyan Methodist, and became treasurer for the district Nonconformist Evangelical Council and he was an advocate of Temperance. He was active in local affairs, and when the borough (of Burslem) was incorporated in 1878 he was made an alderman shortly afterwards. Apart from being Mayor on 2 occasions and a magistrate, he was also governor of the Haywood Charity (supporting the original Haywood Hospital built in 1886–1887).

He died in his sleep on the night of October 28, 1900, and his funeral was a large affair with all members of the town council present and thousands lining the streets.

The family had some tragedies - including the loss of William's first two wives. In 1883 their 9-year-old son, Thomas Emanuel died, and in August 1897 they lost their 26-year-old son William Henry Boulton who drowned while bathing at Barmouth, and on 7 December the same year they lost their 17-year-old son Charles Edward.

When Boulton died he left three sons and two daughters, however their son Herbert Stanley Boulton, who was a gunner with the Royal Artillery during WW1, died in April 1918 in Italy, aged 35. William's wife, Mary, died in 1920.

== Engineering contributions ==
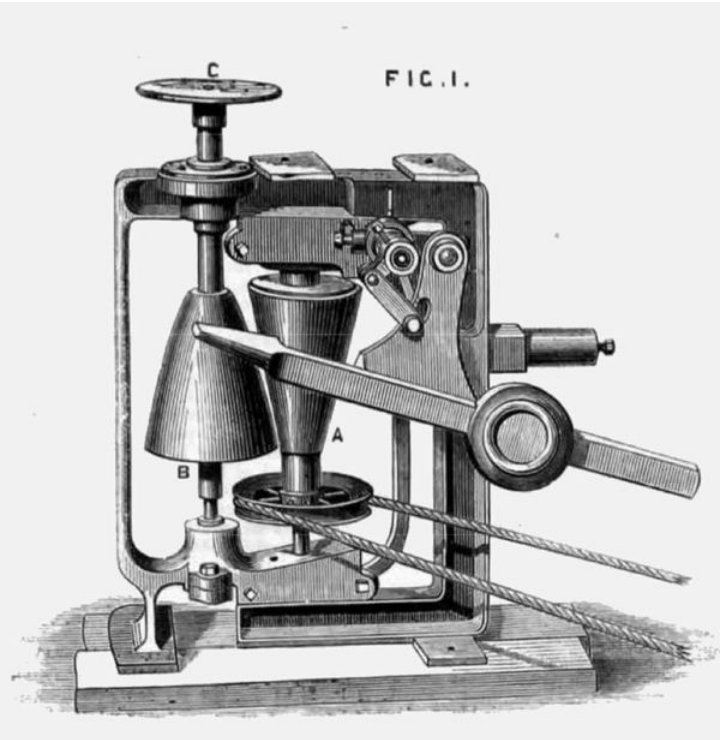
Boulton Variable Speed Potters Wheel

William Boulton created William Boulton Ltd in 1852, and decided to focus his engineering talents on the mechanisation of the pottery industry which was still using methods that had remained unchanged for generations. Production of his new machinery for the pottery industry was based at the company's Providence Foundry in Burslem.

Adverts in 1881 listed William Boulton Ltd as patentee and sole maker of :

- Patent Blungers
- Patent Throwing Wheels
- Patent Jiggers
- Patent Press Pumps
- Patent Clay Presses
- Patent Lathes

He also had systems for drying pots using waste steam (from the steam engines used to power his machines) rather than the coal fires previously used, and he also built systems where the waste steam was used for heating the workplace.

Middleport Pottery is an example of a new pottery equipped by William Boulton in 1888, and much of the original equipment remains, including the steam engine, clay blungers, slip pumps and filter presses of the slip house, the jolleys, jiggers and steam dryers of the production areas, and the print presses in the transfer shop.

In many cases Boulton's machinery was replacing heavy manual labour. He promoted (and patented) the use of cotton rope to drive machinery such as throwing wheels replacing the hand cranking by a potters assistant (and as an alternative to overhead line-shafting). The rope drive ran continuously, but the potter could control the speed of the wheel (or stop it) by a variable speed (double cone) drive mechanism operated by foot pedal. For other equipment the rope drive could be engaged or dis-engaged by moving a pinch wheel. He mechanised the blungers, which used to be a heavy job of mixing raw clay with water to separate pure clay. He promoted the use of presses rather than drying ponds to turn clay slip into potters clay. In 1866 he patented a rope-driven jigger (a machine for making flatware such as plates and saucers) and this developed into a fully automated plate making machine. From steam engines and boilers, drive systems, and to every part of production, William Boulton could provide equipment, much of which was covered by his patents.

Some of Boulton's patents :

- 1860 William Boulton "An Improvement in the Construction of Potters' Drying Stoves and workshops, and in apparatus for preparing the clay for the moulds used by the potter, so as to render the process of drying more effectual"
- 1863 William Boulton and Joseph Worthington "An Improved method for inlaying encaustic tiles or other plastic articles and substances"
- 1865 William Boulton and Joseph Worthington "An improved method of and apparatus for making mortars, bowls, spill pots, jelly cans, galvanic troughs and other similar articles"
- 1866 William Boulton and Joseph Worthington "Improvements in apparatus for manufacturing dishes, plates or other similar articles, from pulverised clay, or dust, or other suitabe materials"
- 1866 William Boulton and Joseph Worthington "Improved Method of Manufacturing Tiles etc"
- 1867 William Boulton "An Improved Method of Transmitting Motive Power to Potters' Wheel, lathes, jiggers and other similar machinery for the manufacture of pottery and other articles made from clay"
- 1868 William Boulton "Method of and machinery or apparatus for manufacturing oval and irregular shaped articles of pottery"
- 1874 William Boulton "Improvements in Machinery or Apparatus to be used in the Working or Manufacture of Potter's Clay or other Plastic Material"
- 1875 William Boulton "An Improved Machine or Apparatus for Pressing or Forming Articles in Pottery, or in the Brick and Tile Trade"
- 1878 William Boulton "Improvements in Machinery or Apparatus and means for or connected with the Manufacture of Tiles and other articles of Pottery"
- 1880 William Boulton "Improvements in Machinery or Apparatus for preparing and treating potters' clay and other similar materials, which apparatus is also applicable to other useful purposes"
- 1894 William Boulton "Improvements in Machinery for Making Pottery"
- 1897 William Boulton "Improvements in or Applicable to Filter Presses for Treating Potter's Clay and other Substances."
- 1897 William Boulton "Improvements in or applicable to Sifting Machines for Potter's Clay or other Substances"
