= Listed buildings in Clifton, Cumbria =

Clifton is a civil parish in Westmorland and Furness, Cumbria, England. It contains 15 buildings that are recorded in the National Heritage List for England. Of these, one is listed at Grade II*, the middle of the three grades, and the others are at Grade II, the lowest grade. The parish contains the village of Clifton, and is otherwise rural. Most of the listed buildings are houses, farmhouses, and farm buildings. The other listed buildings include a church, a cross in the churchyard, a boundary stone, and a pottery.

== Key ==
| Grade | Criteria |
|---|---|
| II* | Particularly important buildings of more than special interest |
| II | Buildings of national importance and special interest |

== Buildings ==
| Name and location | Photograph | Date | Notes | Grade |
|---|---|---|---|---|
| St Cuthbert's Church; 54.63634°N 2.72676°W | | 12th century | The chancel was added in the 13th century and the aisle in the 14th century. The church was partly rebuilt in 1846, and repaired after a gas explosion in 1943. It is built in red sandstone and calciferous sandstone with some limestone, and has a green slate roof with stone coping and a cross finial. The church consists of a nave with a south porch, a north aisle, and a chancel, with a bellcote on the west gable. | II* |
| Churchyard cross 54.63624°N 2.72664°W | — | Medieval | The cross is in the churchyard of St Cuthbert's Church, and has been converted into a sundial. It is in calciferous sandstone, and has a square base with a socket. On the base is a chamfered shaft carrying an inscribed 18th-century bronze plate without a gnomon. | II |
| Bainbridge Gate and barn 54.61824°N 2.71660°W | — | Late 17th century | The farmhouse was extended to the left in 1709. The house is rendered, the original part has a green slate roof, and roof of the extension is in Welsh slate. There are two storeys and four bays. The windows in the upper floor are original and mullioned; in the lower floor they have been enlarged and contain casements. The barn to the right is in mixed limestone and sandstone, and it contains a central plank door with a wooden lintel. | II |
| Town End; 54.62938°N 2.71983°W | — | Early 18th century | Originally a farmhouse, later a private house, it was extended in the late 18th century. The house is rendered with quoins and a green slate roof. There are two storeys and two bays, a single bay extension to the right, and a rear wing with an outshut, giving the house a T-shaped plan. The doorway has a chamfered surround. The windows in the original front have three lights and are mullioned, in the extension they are casements, and in the rear wing they are sashes. | II |
| Low Dykes with barn and stable 54.63384°N 2.69918°W | — | Mid 18th century | The farmhouse with stables to the right and a barn to the left are in sandstone under a common roof of green slate. The house has two storeys, three bays, and a rear extension. There is a central doorway with a stone surround, above which is a datestone. The windows in the ground floor are mullioned, and in the upper floor they are sashes. The stable has two bays, a central doorway with a sandstone lintel, and a casement window, and in the barn is a segmental-arched opening. (Note: Street View in March 2010 shows that the barn has been converted for residential use.) | II |
| Town End Farmhouse and barns 54.62908°N 2.71986°W | — | Mid 18th century | The farmhouse is rendered and has a green slate roof. There are two storeys and five bays. The central doorway and casement windows have atone surrounds. The barn to the left is in sandstone and has a roof of sandstone flags and green slate. There are three bays, and the barn has an L-shaped plan. It contains plank doors, loft doorways and ventilation slits. | II |
| High Dykes and barn 54.63828°N 2.71079°W | — | 1772 | A farmhouse with a barn to the right in sandstone with quoins and a green slate roof. The house has two storeys and two bays. The central doorway has a rusticated surround, the ground floor windows have three lights and are mullioned, and the windows in the upper floor are sashes. The barn has two bays and contains a doorway, a casement window and a loft door, all in stone surrounds. | II |
| Clifton Dykes Cottages and barn 54.63795°N 2.70902°W | — | Late 18th century | Originally a farmhouse, later divided into two dwellings, and the barn to the right, have green slate roofs. The house is rendered and has two storeys and three bays. Some of the windows are sashes, and others are horizontally-sliding sashes; these and the two doorways have stone surrounds. The barn is in stone, it is lower, and has a segmental-headed cart entrance and a flat-headed doorway. | II |
| Brownhow; 54.62484°N 2.68534°W | — | Late 18th or early 19th century | A farmhouse that is roughcast with angle pilasters and a hipped green slate roof. There are two storeys and three bays. The windows have two lights with round heads in flat-headed surrounds, and with hood moulds. The doorway on the left return has a stone porch with a hipped roof and above the door is a round-headed fanlight. | II |
| Clifton Hall Farmhouse; 54.63669°N 2.72729°W | — | Late 18th or early 19th century | The farmhouse is stuccoed with quoins and a green slate roof. There are two storeys, three bays, and a single-bay lean-to extension. The central door has a fanlight, and the windows are sashes, all with stone surrounds. | II |
| Clifton Rectory; 54.63662°N 2.72641°W | — | Late 18th or early 19th century | The rectory is roughcast with sandstone dressings and a hipped roof. There are two storeys, three bays, and extensions at the rear. In the centre of the front is a prostyle porch with fluted Ionic columns, flanked by two-storey canted bay windows containing sashes. In the rear extension are round-headed stair windows and sash windows. | II |
| Whitrigg House and Park Gate; 54.63339°N 2.72471°W | — | Late 18th or early 19th century | A pair of stuccoed houses on a chamfered plinth, with quoins and a green slate roof. They have two storeys and three bays each. Park Gate, on the left, has a prostyle Tuscan porch, and Whitrigg House, to the right, has a prostyle pilastered porch. The windows are sashes in stone surrounds. | II |
| Mount Clifton; 54.62442°N 2.71714°W | — | Early 19th century | The farmhouse is rendered with quoins and a hipped green slate roof. There are two storeys and three bays. On the front is a cast iron porch and a doorway with a stone surround and a fanlight. The windows are sashes, also with stone surrounds. | II |
| Parish boundary stone 54.63802°N 2.70905°W | — | 1847 | The stone marks the boundary between the parishes of Clifton and Brougham. It is in cast iron supported by sandstone, and has a triangular plan with a plate on each side containing the names of the parishes. One plate also has the date, and this is repeated on the top. | II |
| Wetheriggs Pottery; 54.62966°N 2.69108°W | | 1855 | The pottery originated as a brick and tile works for the Brougham estate. The buildings comprise a circular beehive kiln 20 feet (6.1 m) high, workshops, a drying shed, a kiln room, a steam house with a chimney stack 15 feet (4.6 m) high, and a blunger. They are in red brick with pantile roofs, with the chimney stack in brick and stone. The buildings are arranged in a U-shape around a courtyard. The pottery continues to be productive, and is open to the public. The kiln at the pottery is designated as a Scheduled Monument. | II |

== Notes and references ==
=== Sources ===
- Historic England, "Church of St Cuthbert, Clifton (1348695)", National Heritage List for England
- Historic England, "Cross south of Church of St Cuthbert, Clifton (1326779)", National Heritage List for England
- Historic England, "Bainbridge Gate and adjoining barn, Clifton (1099899)", National Heritage List for England
- Historic England, "Town End immediately north-east of Town End Farmhouse, Clifton (1326780)", National Heritage List for England
- Historic England, "Low Dykes with barn and stable adjoining, Clifton (1145364)", National Heritage List for England
- Historic England, "Town End Farmhouse and barns adjoining, Clifton (1348689)", National Heritage List for England
- Historic England, "High Dykes and barn adjoining, Clifton (1326781)", National Heritage List for England
- Historic England, "Clifton Dykes Cottages and barn adjoining, Clifton (1145363)", National Heritage List for England
- Historic England, "Brownhow, Clifton (1348694)", National Heritage List for England
- Historic England, "Clifton Hall Farmhouse, Clifton (1145361)", National Heritage List for England
- Historic England, "Clifton Rectory, Clifton (1099922)", National Heritage List for England
- Historic England, "Whitrigg House and Park Gate, Clifton (1099930)", National Heritage List for England
- Historic England, "Mount Clifton, Clifton (1145362)", National Heritage List for England
- Historic England, "Parish boundary stone in front of Clifton Dykes Cottages, Clifton (1099905)", National Heritage List for England
- Historic England, "Wetheriggs Pottery, Clifton (1145365)", National Heritage List for England
- Historic England, "The Old Kiln, Wetheriggs Pottery, Clifton (1007120)", National Heritage List for England
- Historic England, Listed Buildings
- Hyde, Matthew; Pevsner, Nikolaus (2010) [1967], Cumbria, The Buildings of England, New Haven and London: Yale University Press, ISBN 978-0-300-12663-1
