= Middleport Pottery =

Pottery manufacturer in Stoke-on-Trent (UK)

Middleport Pottery (Burgess and Leigh)
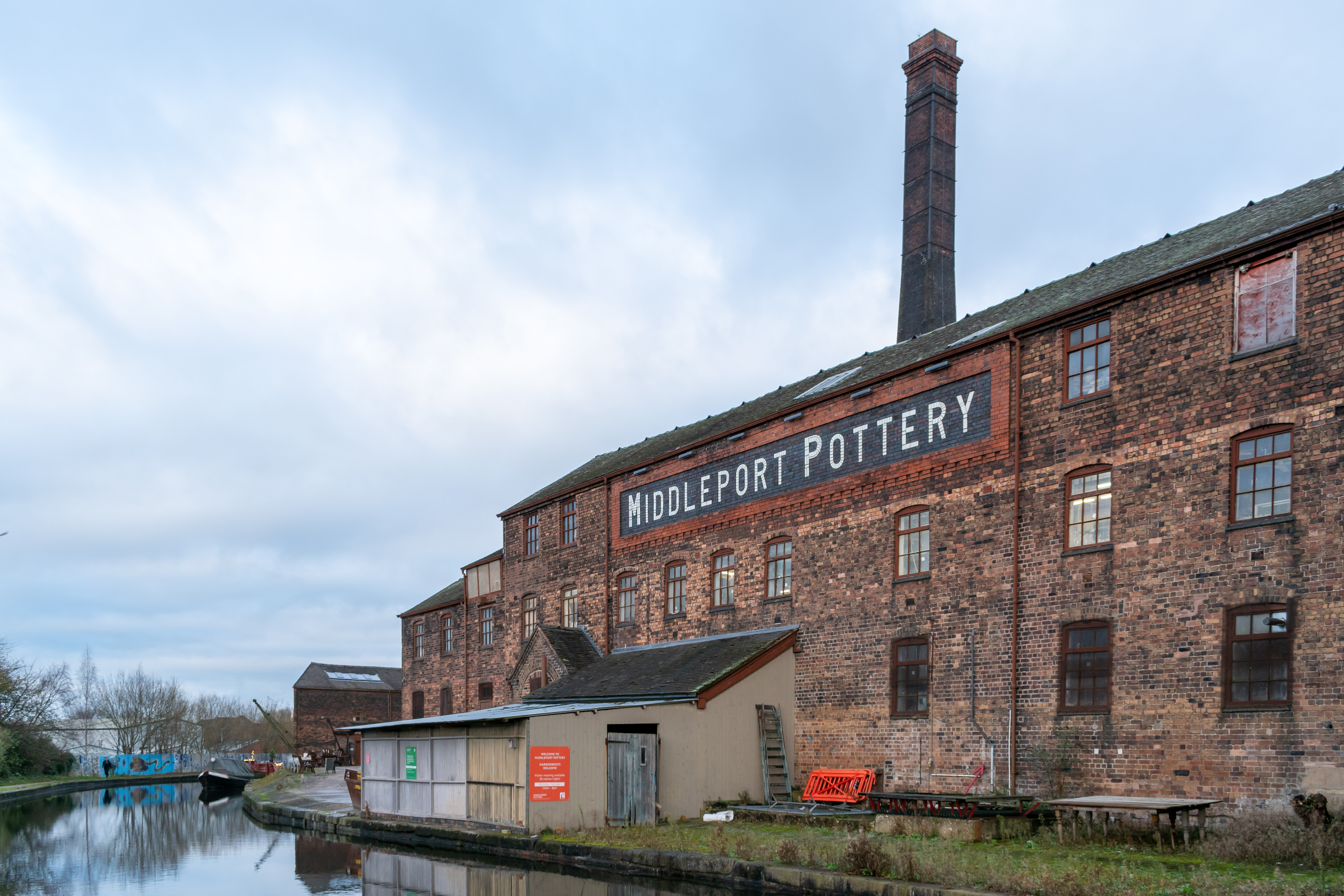
- Location: Middleport, City of Stoke-on-Trent, United Kingdom
- Website: Official website

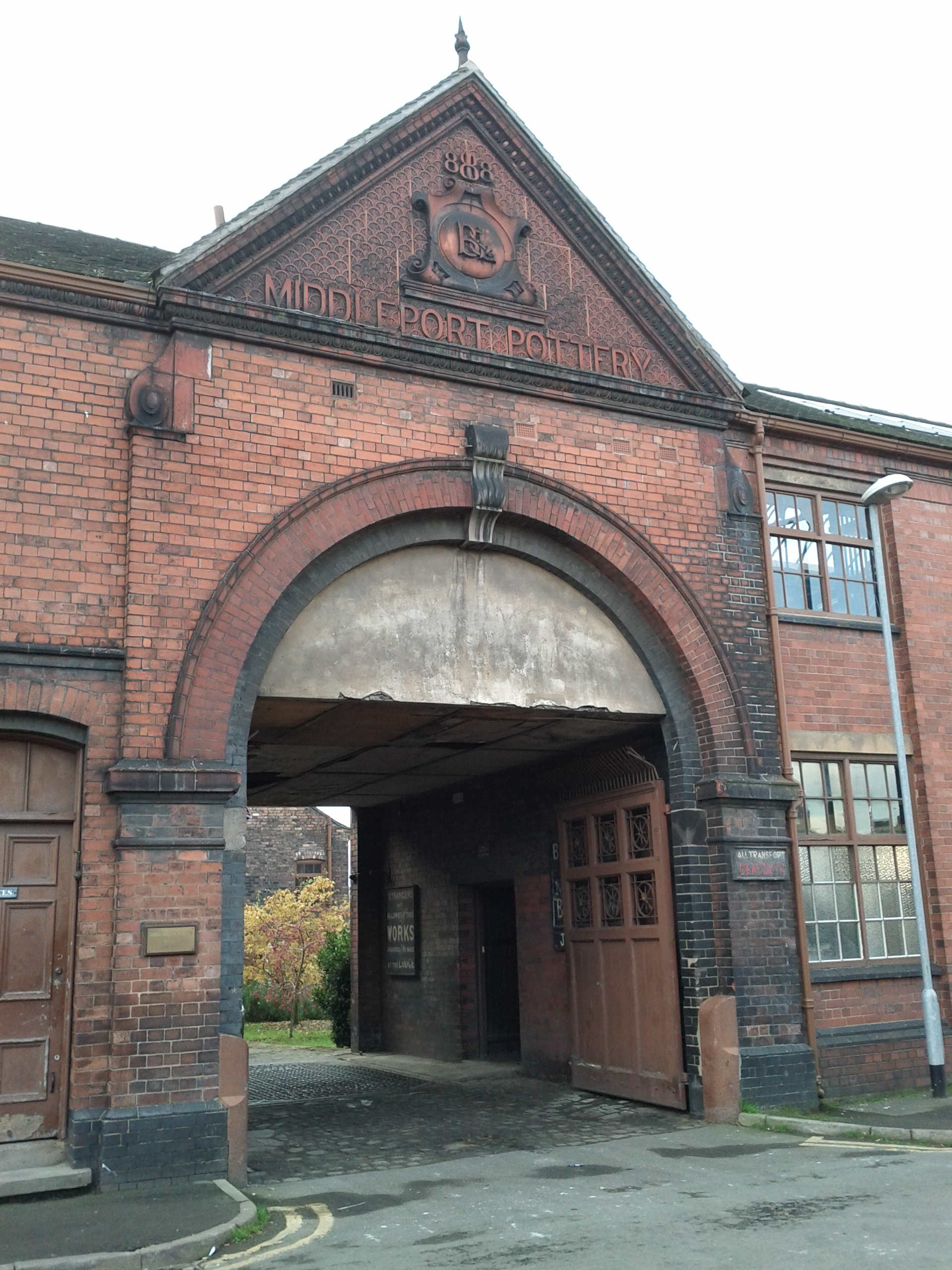
Middleport Pottery, entry (2014)

Middleport Pottery was built in 1888 by Burgess & Leigh Ltd (founders William Leigh and Frederick Rathbone Burgess). It is located at Middleport, Stoke-on-Trent, England. The buildings, which still house an active pottery, are protected for their historic interest. Middleport Pottery is owned and operated by Re-Form Heritage.

== History ==
Middleport Pottery has been described as a “model pottery" of the Staffordshire pottery industry at the time of its construction. Its scale and linear organisation contrast with the constricted sites and haphazard layout of traditional potteries such as the Gladstone Pottery Museum.

It was designed to make all production processes more efficient and to improve conditions for the workforce. The passageways between the ranges were just wide enough for a cart to get through, and for the easy movement of workers and pottery. Finished pottery was placed, using the crane next to the packing house, directly onto barges on the Trent and Mersey Canal waiting to take the ceramics out to the coast for international export. Alternatively they were sent out by horse and cart via the road.

The Boulton steam engine powered the machinery for mixing clay and continued to be in use until the coal strike of the 1970s. It was fed by a large boiler that also provided steam for heating and drying pottery. The steam engine has now been restored to working order.

Middleport Pottery had many pre-eminent designers over the years. Charlotte Rhead worked there from 1926 to 1931 producing her tube-lined designs, and David Copeland worked at the pottery in the 1960s, bringing modern designs while still using traditional copperplate engraving technique.

The pottery went into bankruptcy in 1999. Three offers were considered. Two wished to demolish the pottery for its land, while one offer was from William and Rosemary Dorling who wished to save the pottery and continue production. They revitalized the inventory with new colors and were moving forward, but unfortunately, a bookkeeper was embezzling funds and not paying taxes. In 2010, the Dorlings sold the pottery to Denby Holdings Limited, the parent company of Denby Pottery based in Derbyshire. The Dorlings remained on staff as consultants for three months. After a year, Denby sold the pottery to the Prince's Regeneration Trust so it could be restored and renovated.The Dorlings were a key part of the history of the pottery. Had it not been for their efforts, there would have been no pottery left to be renovated.

== Conservation status of Middleport Pottery ==
The pottery was given listed building status in the 1970s. By this time six of the seven bottle ovens on the site had been demolished. The surviving bottle oven was given its own listing. In 1988 the course of the Trent and Mersey Canal through Stoke-on-Trent was designated a linear conservation area.

=== Urban decay ===
English Heritage put the canal conservation area on the "Conservation Areas at Risk" register in 2010, in large part because of urban decay caused by the decline of traditional industries. A 2011 review of the conservation area noted that Middleport Pottery was a building at risk.

== The Prince’s Regeneration Trust / Re-Form Heritage involvement ==
By 2010 Middleport Pottery was at serious risk of permanent closure because of the very poor state of repair of the buildings and an inefficient layout of manufacturing. This would have seen the loss of jobs and substantial buildings of historic significance would have been left to further degenerate. In the same year The Prince's Regeneration Trust, a charity founded by Charles III, stepped in to buy and save the buildings with a back-to-back deal with Denby Holdings Ltd., the owner of Denby Pottery. It began a £9 million project to restore the structures, partly funded by the National Lottery Heritage Fund and Historic England. When the work of The Prince's Regeneration Trust was divested to several other non-profits its interest in Middleport Pottery was transferred to Re-Form Heritage, an independent charity that had previously been the property-owning wing of the Trust, and which is now the heritage development trust for Stoke-on-Trent.

The restoration work was led by Feilden Clegg Bradley Studios and included a varied and extensive programme of training and educational activities to support the local community in skills provision with an emphasis on traditional British craftsmanship. The pottery opened to the public as a visitor destination in July 2014 following the three-year regeneration.

The restoration enabled Burleigh Pottery to remain on-site, saving local jobs and craftsmanship. In total the restoration has saved 50 local jobs and created 70 more. The unused buildings have been developed to provide accommodation for workshops, enterprise space, craft and community areas, a café, a gallery and a heritage visitor centre. Areas of the site no longer in use for pottery manufacture provide visitor facilities and workspaces for rent.

== Change of ownership in 2026 ==
Sixteen years after acquiring Burleigh, Denby Pottery filed for administration in 2026. Although Burleigh entered administration alongside Denby, it was rescued separately. Burleigh was acquired by the fashion designer Christopher Bailey. Burleigh continues to operate in the factory as a tenant of Re-Form Heritage, and as a result the production of Burleigh Pottery has continued uninterrupted at this site since it opened in 1889.

== Visitor destination ==
Following renovations, Middleport Pottery was opened to visitors in 2014. The pottery has enjoyed rising visitor numbers, and a number of businesses are based at the site. Burleigh Pottery is still produced at the site using traditional craftsmanship.

=== Prince of Wales Studios ===
The Old Packing House was refurbished and became the new Prince of Wales Studios that is open as a business home for craftspeople to work and exhibit their products. The Prince's Regeneration Trust granted £200,000 to the Pottery towards the conversion. Prince Charles, who had previously visited the pottery, made a return visit to help open the Studios in January 2016, including unveiling some signs. He also visited in 2017.

=== Awards ===
Since it opened as a visitor destination, the pottery has won eight awards: a RIBA National Award for architectural excellence; three RIBA West Midlands Awards; a Europa Nostra Award for heritage; a Civic Trust AABC Conservation Award for building conservation; a Placemaking Award for heritage; and a Heritage Open Days’ Community Champions Award.

=== Filming ===
It was the location for four series of The Great Pottery Throw Down, and was featured in an episode of Peaky Blinders.
