= Wetheriggs Zoo and Animal Sanctuary =

British animal welfare charity

Coordinates: 54.632°N 2.693°W

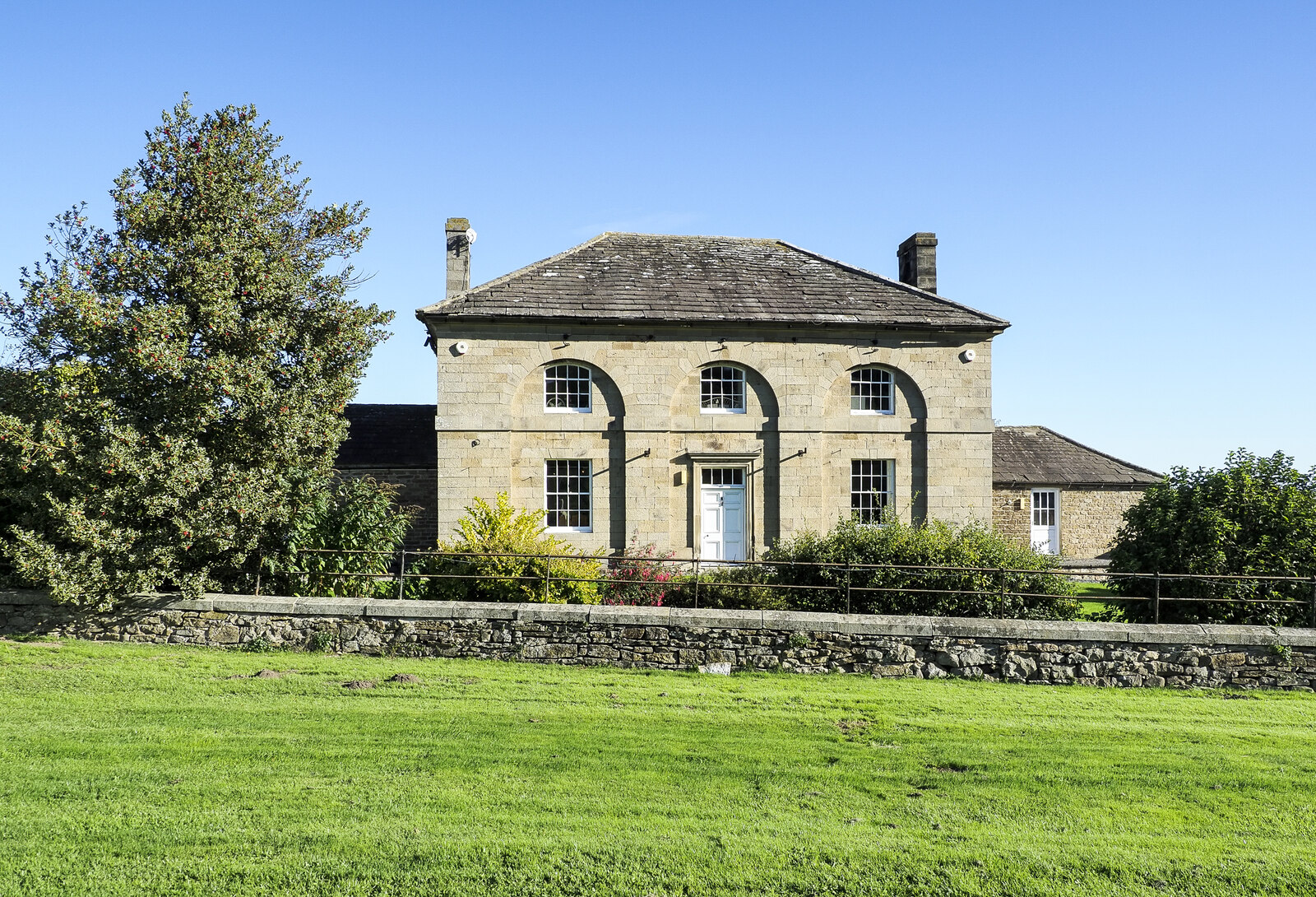
Entrance

Wetheriggs Animal Rescue (previously called Wetheriggs Zoo and Animal Sanctuary) is a registered UK charity. Wetheriggs is an international animal rescue centre now located on the A66 just outside Barnard Castle in County Durham, England. The rescue centre takes in a wide range of animals apart from domestic cats and dogs. Many of the animals were previously pets which could no longer be looked after. The majority of the other animals have been rescued from around the UK. Some of the animals have also come from other animal centres on the world as part of swaps.

== History ==
The animal rescue was opened on the historic Wetheriggs Pottery site in 2006 by Terry Bowes, a zookeeping veteran for 45 years. In 2008, because of its work in the attempted re-creation of the Cumberland Pig, its work with rare poultry breeds, and work with native newts, it became the Wetheriggs Animal Rescue and Conservation Centre. It was re-branded to Wetheriggs Zoo and Animal Sanctuary in 2011. In 2014, the animal rescue relocated to a new home at Thorpe Farm Centre near Barnard Castle in County Durham, and was renamed Wetheriggs Animal Rescue and Conservation Centre.

== Animals ==
The centre is home to alpacas, sheep, goats, cows, horses, chickens, ducks, geese, turkeys, pigs, donkeys, rabbits, guinea pigs, rats, mice, gerbils, hedgehogs, budgies, quails, skunks, tarantulas, reptiles and more.

Currently, some of the exotic animals the centre cares for are off display to visitors.

The centre depends on the generosity of the general public to keep running. Visitors to the site pay admission into the site and all the money goes directly to the animal welfare work. People can also donate money directly to the centre.
