= Middleport, Staffordshire =

Coordinates: 53.0436°N 2.2034°W

Middleport
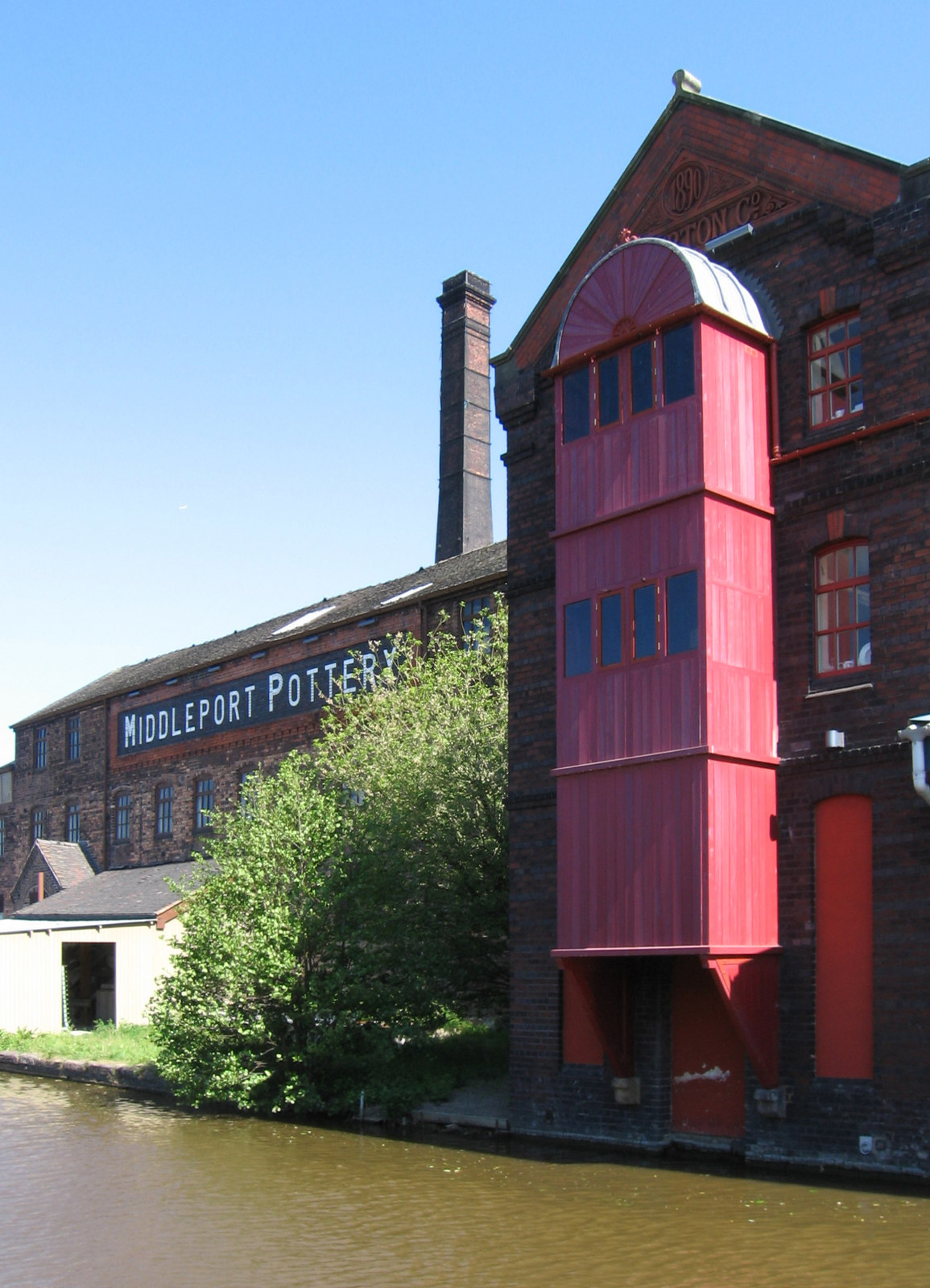
- Middleport – Pottery

- Location within Staffordshire
- OS grid reference: SJ864496
- Unitary authority: Stoke-on-Trent
- Ceremonial county: Staffordshire
- Region: West Midlands
- Country: England
- Sovereign state: United Kingdom
- Post town: STOKE-ON-TRENT
- Postcode district: ST6
- Dialling code: 01782
- Police: Staffordshire
- Fire: Staffordshire
- Ambulance: West Midlands
- UK Parliament: Stoke-on-Trent North

Middleport is a residential and industrial district in the city of Stoke-on-Trent, England. Middleport lies to the west of Burslem, between Burslem and the Newcastle-under-Lyme district of Porthill. To the north is Tunstall and to the south Cobridge and Etruria. Middleport conjoins Longport.

Middleport is primarily residential, with distinctive Victorian terraced houses. However, it also a working industrial district and contains several potteries: ranging from Middleport Pottery, owned by Re-Form Heritage and claimed to be the only working Victorian pottery remaining in the city, and Steelite, a large manufacturer of hotelware.

The Trent and Mersey Canal and a key path of the National Cycle Network run through Middleport. The line of the canal through the City of Stoke-on-Trent is a linear conservation area. Middleport contains one of the nation's richest stretches of canalside industrial heritage. Since 1990 the canal area has benefited from around £1m of Groundwork funding, and £4m of Townscape Heritage funding. Clarice Cliff's Newport Pottery, where she produced some of her most famous work, was adjacent to the canal and an artist-designed 12-foot steel markerpost identifies the location.

Middleport is an area that is strategic to the regeneration of the city, as it sits in the centre of a ring of imminent projects totalling around £250m: the Chatterley Valley scheme, the Etruria Valley scheme, the regeneration of Burslem town centre, and a proposed major "park and ride" interchange and business-park on the site of the old Shelton Bar steel rolling-mill.

Middleport piloted a community warden service in 2002 & 2003; as a result, crime dropped by 80 per cent. The service was subsequently extended across Stoke-on-Trent and adopted in other cities.

Middleport features in several of the novels of Arnold Bennett, and the film version of his The Card was filmed in Middleport with Alec Guinness.

Middleport Park Bowling Club has a national reputation and has won several national trophies.

Middleport Matters (founded 2015) is a local community action group dedicated to improving the lives of those who live and work in Middleport and the surrounding areas.
