= Bartolomé Ruiz González =

Spanish archaeologist

Bartolomé Ruiz González (born 1954 in Casabermeja, Málaga) is a Spanish archaeologist who has been involved in cultural management in Andalucia since the late 1970s. He currently runs the Archaeological Ensemble of the Antequera Dolmens and is the director of the Royal Academy of Fine Arts of Antequera.

== Education and research activity ==
He received his Philosophy and Arts degree in Geography and History from the University of Málaga in 1977. He was unanimously granted the distinction of Cum Laude for his undergraduate Thesis entitled “La Carta Prehistórica de la Provincia de Málaga”, overseen by Professor Antonio Arribas Palau at the University of Granada in 1980. Throughout those years, under the guidance of Professors José Enrique Ferrer Palma and Ignacio Marqués Merelo, Ruiz González carried out archaeological excavation work at different prehistoric necropolises in the provinces of Málaga -Casabermeja, Ronda and Antequera-, Cádiz -El Gastor-, and Granada -Fonelas-, as well as a series of excavation campaigns at the cave of Las Palomas de Teba (Málaga). He later worked at the Cave of Nerja with Prehistory Professors Manuel Pellicer Catalán and Francisco Jordá Cerdán. In 1988 he visited the Royal Academy of Spain in Rome as a Resident in order to gain a better understanding of the Italian management model for the guardianship of cultural and environmental assets. His research activity thus focused on three areas: archaeology, heritage and cultural management.

Nowadays he is a scientific collaborator in the research on the cave of El Toro (El Torcal, Antequera, Málaga), conducted within the framework of the R&D&I Projects: HAR2011-29068 (2012-2015, Lead Investigator Dimas Martín Socas) ‘’Society, Technology and Artisan Specialisation. The first rural societies and social hierarchy in the south of the Iberian Peninsula (5th – 3rd millennium B.C.)’’; and HAR2012-38857 (2013-2016, Lead Investigator María Dolores Camalich Massieu) ‘’Technology and Society: specialisation and artisan diversification in eastern Andalusia between the 6th – 3rd millennium B.C.’’ He is also a Researcher on the project R&D&I HAR2013-45149-P (2014-2017, Lead Investigator Leonardo García Sanjuán) ‘’Nature, Society and Monumentality: High Resolution Archaeological Investigations on the Megalithic Landscape of Antequera".

== Career ==
He is a civil servant of the Senior Governmental Body of the Regional Government of Andalusia, serving as a Historical Heritage Curator and Archaeologist and having held various senior positions in the Administration of the Provincial Government of Málaga and the Regional Government of Andalusia with the duties of Expert Technician, Management and Senior Management on issues concerning cultural management and actions for the guardianship of Historical Heritage (administration, research, protection, preservation and dissemination).

=== Archaeologist for the Architecture, Urban Development and Territorial Planning Service of the Provincial Government of Málaga (1979-1983) ===
He established the Department of Archaeology of the Provincial Government of Málaga, developing Provincial Archaeology Plans, several “archaeological reports” for different planning instruments and the “Catalogue of Archaeological Sites in the Province of Málaga” as an instrument for the protection of Archaeological Heritage. There started to be talk about urban and preventive archaeology, planning and rescue excavations…; in short, new terminology that was quickly incorporated into archaeological language. This “Archaeological Methodology for urban planning”, ground-breaking in Andalusia and Spain, led to the award of the National Urban Planning Prize in 1980.

=== Director General of Cultural Heritage for the Ministry of Culture of the Regional Government of Andalusia (1983-1984) ===
With Rafael Escudero Rodríguez as president of the Regional Government of Andalusia and Rafael Román Guerrero as the Minister for Culture.

The first regional Governing Council, formed in July 1982, began to negotiate the transfer of functions and services for cultural matters in order to enable the powers conferred by the Spanish Constitution and the Statute of Autonomy of Andalusia, while at the same time preparing a legislative package on heritage institutions with the collaboration of professional Archivists, Librarians and Museum Curators. In June 1983, with the Alhambra and the Generalife on the negotiating table, Bartolomé Ruiz was put in charge of the General Direction of Cultural Heritage following the resignation of the director up until that point, Juan Antonio Lacomba Avellán. He thus participated in the design and creation of the new historical heritage administration of Andalusia. He assisted in the processing and publication, by the Parliament of Andalusia, of Law 8/1983 of November 3 on Libraries (in effect until 2003), Law 2/1984 of January 9 on Museums (in effect until 2007) and Law 3/1984 of January 9 on Archives (in effect until 2011). This was ground-breaking cultural legislation in Spain that even pre-empted Law 16/1985 of June 25 on Spanish Historical Heritage itself.

Additionally, he promotes the contemporary art magazine FIGURA (spring 1983 - October 1988), which echoed in national and international artistic fields as a result of its prestigious editorial board and top-level artistic collaborations on its covers and in its articles.

=== Director General of Fine Arts for the Ministry of Culture of the Regional Government of Andalusia (1984-1986) ===
With José Rodríguez de la Borbolla Camoyán as president of the Regional Government of Andalusia and Javier Torres Vela as the Minister for Culture

The negotiation with the Government of Spain ended with the unblocking of the Alhambra and the Generalife and Ruiz González was in charge of managing the duties regarding historical heritage as a result of the transfer of functions and services passed on to the Regional Government of Andalusia under Royal Decree 864/1984 of February 29 and Decree 180/1984 of June 19, and thus assigned to the Ministry of Culture. In order to transfer the management of Museums, an Agreement was signed between the Spanish Government and the Regional Government of Andalusia in October 1984; this agreement regulated the rules concerning collections and properties as well as the legal framework for staff and all aspects related to organisation and communication.

Among the responsibilities transferred, special attention must be paid to the functions and services that the Government of Spain had been exercising with regard to the Monumental Ensemble of the Alhambra and Generalife in Granada, either directly or via the regional body that was established for this purpose under the Decree of March 9, 1940. This regional body of the Administration, called the Council of the Alhambra and Generalife, continued to exercise its duties until Royal Decree 565/1985 of April 24 expressly prohibited this in its first additional provision. Upon eliminating this legal entity, the aforementioned Royal Decree required that the assigned functions be taken over either by a new entity or directly by the Administration. From this moment onwards, the Ministry of Culture of the Regional Government of Andalusia took on the functions and services of the eliminated Council and began drafting the corresponding Bill, aware of the need to create its own autonomous legal Entity to carry out these functions and, under a system of decentralisation, allocate the unique actions involved in the guardianship, preservation and administration of the Alhambra and Generalife. But this process was slow, thus making it necessary to temporarily establish, while the aforementioned Bill was being drafted, an agile and functional administrative body without legal status that could effectively address all of the services corresponding to the Monumental Ensemble of the Alhambra and Generalife in Granada. Pending the establishment by Law of an autonomous body responsible for the guardianship of the Alhambra and Generalife of Granada, a Commission was created to manage and control its services as well as affiliate all the human and material resources of the eliminated Council's administrative structure with this Commission. In late 1985 the Monumental Ensemble of the Alhambra and Generalife was created as an autonomous organism, and in 1986 the Statutes were approved, establishing participation of the different Public Administrations responsible for the protection of this historical heritage site in the governing and executive organisms of the Entity. The Statutes also established the participation on the Entity’s advisory body of experts renowned in the field of Historical Heritage. This was all carried out with the basic purpose of giving effect to the principles of efficiency, decentralisation and coordination included in article 103.1 of the Spanish Constitution.

In 1985 Ruiz González launched the Special Plan of Action for the Fine Arts (PAEMBA) (in Spanish: Plan de Actuación Especial en Materia de Bellas Artes) with a budget that amounted to 3 million euros. The fundamental objective was to analyse what kind of conditions the cultural properties were in. 1,284 people were hired for this purpose, of which 202 were curators, 180 assistants, 205 auxiliary technicians, 66 administrative assistants and 631 subordinate employees. The development and implementation of this employment plan made it possible to make progress on the General Plan for Cultural Properties; the distribution of this document among heritage professionals and social agents gave rise to an intense debate.

Also it promotes, jointly with the Council of Education, the creation of the Pedagogical Cabinets of Fine Arts to essentially bring students closer to historical heritage properties. This complied with the legislation that stated that “in a democratic Country these properties must be appropriately made available to the community, with the firm conviction that their enjoyment is culturally enriching and that this is, in short, the sure way towards achieving the freedom of peoples.” (Preamble of Law 16/1985 of June 25 on Spanish Historical Heritage). This dissemination of historical heritage became the most solid project that had ever been carried out in Spain.

In 1986, the creation of the joint Committee for Cultural Heritage between the Regional Government of Andalusia and the Bishops of the Catholic Church of Andalusia was agreed upon.

=== Director General of Cultural Properties for the Ministry of Culture of the Regional Government of Andalusia (1986-1988) ===
With José Rodríguez de la Borbolla Camoyán as president of the Regional Government of Andalusia and Javier Torres Vela as the Minister for Culture

Law 6/1985, on the Organisation of the Public Function of the Regional Government of Andalusia stated that the list of employment positions is the instrument with which the public administration is balanced and arranged. Decree 395/1986 approved the first list of employment positions in the Regional Government of Andalusia, thus defining its central, local and institutional administration (Archives, Libraries, Museums and Monumental and Archaeological Sites); all civil servants as well as non-civil servant staff appeared on this list. This list of employment positions would be developed from the personnel that were transferred, by recovering the vacancies and transforming them into new, specialised positions for historical heritage, archives, libraries and museums. The guardianship of historical heritage was also professionalised by establishing senior specialised bodies and assistants to heritage professionals, museum professionals, archivists, librarians and documentation specialists; thus, it was the first Autonomous Community in Spain to regulate the creation of specialised bodies and assistants in historical heritage.

The precedent of PAEMBA allowed strategic planning to be driven with the advancing development of the First General Plan for Cultural Properties (in Spanish, I Plan General de Bienes Culturales), in effect from 1989-1995. The Plan included four fields (Ethnology, Archaeology, Movable Property and Real Estate) for each of which five important lines of action needed to be carried out (Research, Restoration, Preservation, Protection and Dissemination). Approved unanimously by all parliamentary groups, it was the first document of these characteristics in Spain Its development involved: the publication of Law 1/1991 on Historical Heritage of Andalusia, the promotion of strategic planning on guardianship, the creation of institutions (such as the General Archive of Andalusia in 1987, the Andalusian Institute of Historical Heritage, the Monumental Ensembles of Santa María de las Cuevas and the Alcazaba of Almería and the Archaeological Sites of Medina Azahara, Italica and Baelo Claudia in 1989 and Carmona in 1992). The Plan was set up as an organisational tool for Cultural Administration in the field of Historical Heritage. It addressed the conceptual issues regarding the guardianship of Cultural Heritage, guidelines and fundamental principles of actions in this field; it also defined the administrative instruments necessary for carrying this out by establishing the basic organisation of the specialised management of historical Heritage in addition to planning actions. The seven programmes dealt with different aspects of the guardianship of historical heritage, understood as the comprehensive work ranging from protection to preservation and restoration, from dissemination to the enhancement of cultural properties; this way, the programmes would be the large groups that were formed by the plans integrated into them.

Particularly important was the archaeological research programme known in scientific literature as the “Andalusian Model of Archaeology”. It was based on considering archaeology as an instrument for researching history that was tied to the management of heritage, contributing to site preservation and facilitating yearly dissemination of the results. The model started to be implemented in 1984 with the creation of the Andalusian Commission of Archaeology, the definition of the figure of provincial archaeologists and the publication of the order to regulate the granting of authorisations to carry out archaeological activities. in 1985. The originality of this commission was that, as an advisory body composed of independent archaeologists, its agreements were always taken into consideration for the authorisation of the so-called systematic archaeological actions and projects. Coordination with provincial archaeologists was furthered via a series of regular meetings for exchanging experiences, consolidating criteria for activities and receiving suggestions concerning the management model. A whole new generation of young university professors, led by Arturo Ruiz Rodríguez, carried out a process of establishing a practice of archaeological management, an example in the Spain of the autonomous regions and a subject of observation and study in other countries. The model was extremely flexible, but as it developed it exposed the real disconnect between the fields of pure research and management, between the interest in preserving heritage as a property in and of itself and the speculation of urban projects, the difficulty in assigning responsibilities and roles among the different local and regional administrations acting together in practice… The situation which would finally speed up the crisis of the model in October 1987 was the conflict that arose in La Marina Plaza in Málaga, when the city council started to tear down some spectacular walls for the construction of an underground car park. The General Direction of Cultural Properties paralysed construction work and carried out an extensive archaeological intervention that justified the need to preserve the aforementioned walls. The administrations tried to reach an agreement, but political criteria finally took precedence over technical criteria; the result was the immediate dismissal of Bartolomé Ruiz in May 1988.

=== Technical Support Archaeologist for the Area of Cooperation of the Provincial Government of Málaga (1988-1989) ===
Having returned to his position as an Archaeologist with the Provincial Government of Málaga, Bartolomé Ruiz visited the Royal Academy of Spain in Rome as a Resident in order to gain a better understanding of the Italian management model for the guardianship of cultural and environmental assets.

=== Director of the Monumental Ensemble of the Monastery of Santa María de las Cuevas (1989-1994) ===
Bartolomé Ruiz launched this newly created institution, directing the process of guardianship and assessment of the Monument of the Monastery of Seville. For this purpose he developed the Restoration Project for the monumental ensemble, converting it into the headquarters of the Royal Pavilion for the Seville Expo '92, thus laying the foundation in Andalusia for the first heritage project (with five architectural projects) to be carried out by an interdisciplinary team (restorers, archaeologists, art historians, documentation specialists and botanists), within the framework of a Master Plan that planned for the site’s subsequent transformation into the headquarters for three cultural institutions: the Andalusian Centre for Contemporary Art (CAAC), the Andalusian Institute of Historical Heritage (IAPH) and the International University of Andalusia (UNIA). As a result, the site obtained the “National Award for Monument Restoration” (in Spanish: Premio Nacional de Restauración de Monumentos) granted by the Royal Foundation of Toledo in 1993 (3rd edition, 1991).

=== Deputy Minister for Culture for the Regional Government of Andalusia (1994-1996) ===
With Manuel Chaves González as president of the Regional Government of Andalusia and José María Martin Delgado as the Minister for Culture

Bartolomé Ruiz facilitated the drafting of the II General Plan for Cultural Properties (1996-2000) and advanced the Regulations for Protecting and Enhancing the Historical Heritage of Andalusia and the creation of Museums and the Management of Museum Materials.

=== Director of the Monumental Ensemble of the Monastery of Santa María de las Cuevas and General Curator of the Andalusian Centre for Contemporary Art (1996-2004) ===
Having returned to his position as Director of the Monumental Ensemble of the Monastery of Santa María de Las Cuevas in Seville he was incorporated as General Curator in the autonomous organism, also headquartered here, called the Andalusian Centre for Contemporary Art. He formed part of the Centre’s Technical Commission and collaborated in the creation of its Master Plan.

=== Director of the Archaeological Ensemble of the Antequera Dolmens (2004-2010) ===
He launched the process of institutionalising the guardianship of the Archaeological Zone, facilitating the drafting of its I Master Plan (2011-2018) as well as the Restoration and Enhancement Project. Thus, the Antequera Dolmens was declared a Property of Cultural Interest (in Spanish, Bien de Interés Cultural, or BIC) with the category of Archaeological Area; the institution became an independently managed administrative service and several scientific outreach initiatives were promoted (Menga - Journal of Andalusian Prehistory, Millenary Antequera Autumn Courses and Conferences on Andalusian Prehistory). Bartolomé Ruiz oversaw the application process for the ensemble’s entry onto the European Heritage Programme List “The Great Stones of Andalusian Prehistory: the Megalithic Sites and Landscapes of Andalusia”.

=== Secretary General for Cultural Policies for the Ministry of Culture of the Regional Government of Andalusia(2010-2012) ===
With José Antonio Griñán as president of the Regional Government of Andalusia and Paulino Plata Cánovas 37 38 as the Minister for Culture

Bartolomé Ruiz promoted the so-called Cultural Policy Planning System of the Regional Government of Andalusia, which included the creation of the following general plans: the III General Plan for Cultural Properties , the General Plan for Cultural Institutions (Plan General de las Instituciones Culturales), the General Plan for Artistic and Literary Creation (Plan General de Creación Artística y Literaria) and the General Plan for Cultural Assets (Plan General de Recursos Culturales). He also promoted the application process for the Antequera Dolmens Site entry onto the Tentative World Heritage List.

Law 7/2011 of November 3rd on Documents, Archives and Documentary Heritage of Andalusia40 was published which, in point 2 of its third final provision adds a second section to article 78 of Law 14/2007 of November 26 on the Historical Heritage of Andalusia, reading as follows: ‘’Cultural complexes shall be governed by the provisions of regulatory laws for museums, notwithstanding the provisions included in this law, in its implementing regulations and in any provisions of the relevant regulations for creating the complex’’; its fourth final provision modifies the first section of article 2 of Law 8/2007 of October 5th on Museums and Museum Collections of Andalusia, reading as follows: ‘’Additionally, the law shall apply to cultural complexes, notwithstanding the provisions included in the regulatory laws for historical heritage and in the regulations for creating the complex.’’ In our legal system this involved adapting cultural complexes to the definition of ‘museum’ provided by the International Council of Museums (ICOM), in anticipation of the drafting of the relevant regulations of these laws which are still pending today.

=== Director of the Archaeological Ensemble of the Antequera Dolmens ( (2012-actuality) ===
Bartolomé Ruiz oversees the application process for entry of the Antequera Dolmens Site onto the Representative UNESCO World Heritage Site List.

=== Professional organisms and institutions ===
Bartolomé Ruiz has held membership in the following professional organisms and institutions: Provincial Board for the Historical Heritage of Málaga, Urban Planning Board of Andalusia, Council of the Alhambra and the Generalife of Granada, Spanish Historical Heritage Council, Technical Commission for the Andalusian Centre for Contemporary Art, Governing Council of the Andalusian Institute of Historical Heritage, Governing Council of the Andalusian Agency of Cultural Institutions, Board of the Picasso Málaga Museum Foundation. The Paul, Christine and Bernard Ruiz-Picasso Legacy and the Committee of the Federico García Lorca Centre.

== Prizes and recognitions ==
National Urban Planning Prize in 1980 from the Government of Spain for his ground-breaking work in urban archaeology in the province of Málaga

Málaga Citizen of the Year Award in 1983 from the Cadena SER radio network in Málaga for his archaeological activity carried out in Málaga.

National Award for Monument Restoration and Preservation from the Royal Foundation of Toledo in 1993 for the Master Plan on restoration of the Monastery of Santa María de Las Cuevas in Seville.

Director of the Royal Academy of Fine Arts of Antequera since 2013, and member of the Management Committee that promotes its refoundation alongside the poet José Antonio Muñoz Rojas from Antequera.

Adopted Son from Antequera 2014

Academic Member of the European Academy of Sciences, Arts and Letters (AESAL) since 2016

VII León Prize of the Lions Club of Antequera in 2016

X Villa de Casabermeja Award in 2017

Medal of Merit of the Royal Academy of Fine Arts of Granada in 2017

Estrella Feniké Award for Culture 2019, Heritage section, awarded by the Zegrí Cultural Association in Málaga

== Publications ==
Relation of publications indexed in the database DIALNET, of which stand out :

- Memorial Luis Siret. I Congreso de Prehistoria de Andalucía. La tutela del patrimonio prehistórico. Seville: Ministry of Culture of the Regional Government of Andalusia, 2011 (coordinator with Margarita Sánchez Romero)
- El Conjunto Arqueológico Dólmenes de Antequera: definición, programación e institucionalización: documento de avance del Plan Director. Seville: Ministry of Culture of the Regional Government of Andalusia, 2011. Volume 1: Definition . Volume 2: Programming . Volume 3: Institutionalization (coordinator)
- The large stones of Prehistory. Megalithics sites and landscapes of Andalusia. Seville: Ministry of Culture of the Regional Government of Andalusia, 2010 (coordinator with Leonardo García Sanjuán)
- La reinstauración cultural de la Cartuja de las Cuevas como legado para Andalucía. Proceso administrativo de la transformación. In Actas preliminares del Seminario Internacional sobre Eventos Mundiales y Cambio Urbano. Seville: University of Seville, 2010; pp. 167–169
- Dólmenes de Antequera. Tutela y valorización hoy. Cuaderno PH XXIII. Seville: Ministry of Culture of the Regional Government of Andalusia, 2009 (coordinator)
- La Alhambra. 25 Años de tutela patrimonial efectiva (1984/2009). Tribuna de El Correo December 3, 2009
- El patrimonio, más cerca de la escuela. Tribuna de Diario SUR June 20, 2006
- El Plan General de Bienes Culturales de Andalucía para el período 1996-1999. In Revista PH n12. Seville: IAPH, 1995; p. 11
- La Cartuja recuperada. Sevilla 1986-1992. Seville: Ministry of Culture and Environment of the Regional Government of Andalusia, 1992 (coordinator)

== Bibliography ==
- Ben Andrés, Luis (2012). La planificación estratégica en la Consejería de Cultura de la Junta de Andalucía (1985-2011) (in Spanish). Cadiz: University of Cadiz. pp. 185–192.
- Pérez Yruela, Manuel; Vives, Pedro A. (2012). La política cultural en Andalucía (in Spanish). Vol. 11, 3. Santiago de Compostela: Faculty of Political and Social Sciences. pp. 65–87.
- Rico Cano, Lidia (2009). La difusión del patrimonio en los materiales curriculares. El caso de los Gabinetes Pedagógicos de Bellas Artes (PDF) (in Spanish). Doctoral dissertation, University of Malaga.
- Lara-Barranco, Paco (2008). 21 años después de la revista Figura (in Spanish). Seville: Cajasol Foundation, Ministry of Culture of the Regional Government of Andalusia. Archived from the original on 2016-06-29.
- Rodríguez Temiño, Ignacio; Rodríguez de Guzmán Sánchez, Sandra (1997). Excavaciones arqueológicas en Andalucía: 1984-1995 (in Spanish). Vol. 54. Seville: University of Seville. pp. 57–70.
- Peral Bejarano, Carmen (1994). La arqueología urbana en Málaga (1986-1992): una experiencia a debate (PDF) (in Spanish). Jaen: University of Jaen. pp. 101–116.
- Salvatierra Cuenca, Vicente (1994). Historia y desarrollo del modelo andaluz de arqueología (in Spanish). Vol. 51, 1. Seville: University of Seville. pp. 1–13.
- Antonio J. Guerrero (2014-07-02). "Bartolomé Ruiz será nombrado Hijo Adoptivo de Antequera" (in Spanish). Diario SUR.
- Francisco Gutiérrez (2010-04-10). "Un pionero en la protección del patrimonio" (in Spanish). Diario SUR.
- Gema González (2010-03-30). "Bartolomé Ruiz regresa a Sevilla para dirigir Políticas Culturales" (in Spanish). Diario de Sevilla.
- Entrevista a Bartolome Ruiz González, Director de Bellas Artes de la Consejería de Cultura de la Junta de Andalucía (in Spanish). Vol. 13. Seville. 1984. pp. 4–11. ISSN 1695-8934.
