= Blunger =

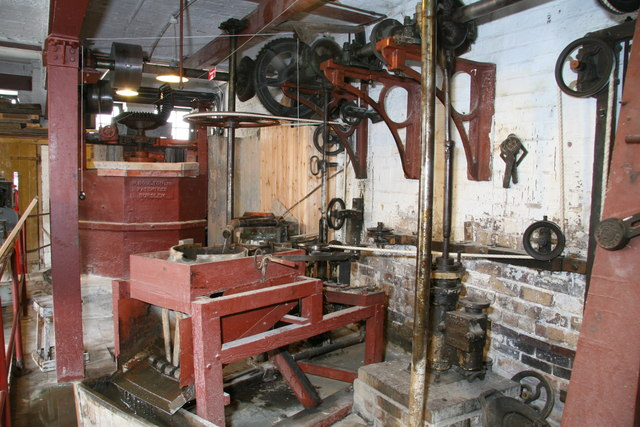
The octagonal tank of a blunger is seen in this photo of the Slip Room at the Gladstone Pottery Museum in Staffordshire, England

A blunger is a machine commonly used in the pottery industry for mixing slip, a mixture of clay and water. A blunger usually consists of a round or octagonal tank with a mixer. Clay is added to the water-filled blunger and then mixed into a slurry, which is also called slip. The electrical charge of the clay particles is neutralized by the addition of a deflocculant, which assists in keeping the particles in suspension. This slip can be sieved as it is emptied from the blunger.

In the potbanks around Stoke-on-Trent the blunger was fed by the "sliphouse blunger charger", who was often assisted by the "sliphouse blunger charger's mate". Different types and amounts of clay and marl had to be shoveled in manually to be mixed with water. Blungers are often used in the kaolin mining industry to mix certain grades of kaolin clay with water.
