= Gladstone Pottery Museum =

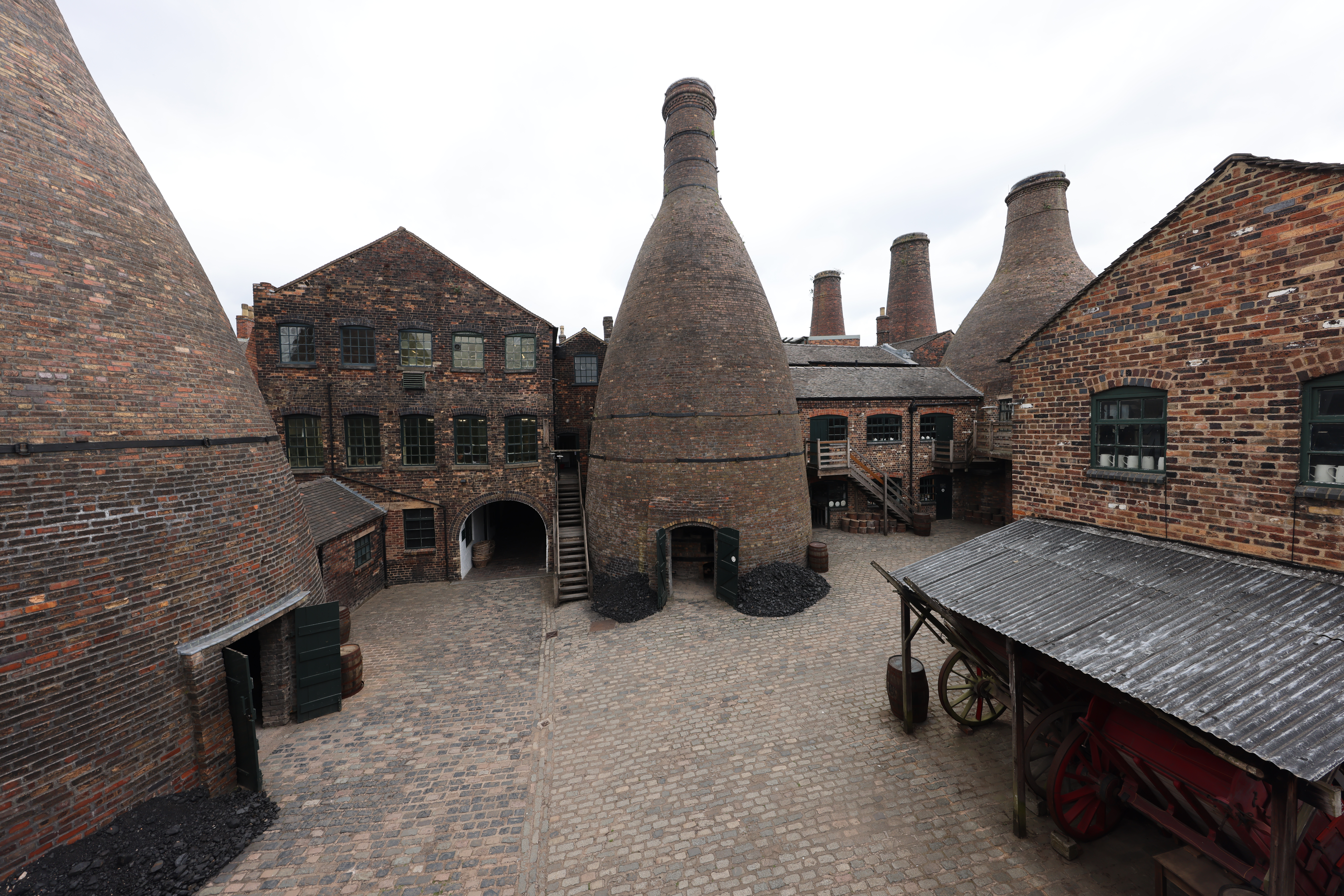
- The courtyard and bottle kilns

- Location within Staffordshire
- Established: 1974
- Location: Longton, Staffordshire, England
- Coordinates: 52.98667°N 2.131488°W
- Type: Industrial museum
- Public transit access: Longton railway station 10 mins by foot
- Website: http://www.stokemuseums.org.uk/visit/gpm/

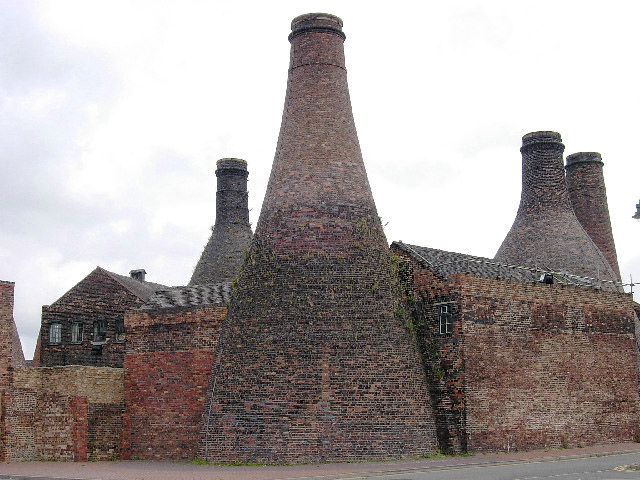
Exterior of Gladstone Pottery Museum

The Gladstone Pottery Museum is a working museum of a medium-sized coal-fired pottery, typical of those once common in the North Staffordshire area of England from the time of the Industrial Revolution in the 18th century to the mid-20th century. It is a grade II* listed building.

The museum is located in Longton, Stoke-on-Trent, Staffordshire. It is also included in one of the regional routes of the European Route of Industrial Heritage. Despite the name of the museum, it is a complex of buildings from two works, the Gladstone and the Roslyn. The protected features include the kilns. As there are fewer than 50 surviving bottle ovens in Stoke-on-Trent (and only a scattering elsewhere in the UK), the museum's kilns along with others in the Longton conservation area represent a significant proportion of the national stock of the structures.

In 1976, the Gladstone Pottery Museum was awarded National Heritage Museum of the Year.

== History ==
A pottery factory first opened on the site in 1787. It was run by the Shelley family who produced earthenware and decorated plates and dishes produced by Josiah Wedgwood in Etruria. The site was purchased in 1789 by William Ward who split it into two pot banks: the Park Place Works subsequently named the Roslyn works, and the Wards Pot Bank which was sold to John Hendley Sheridan in 1818. In the 1850s Sheridan had rented out the site to Thomas Cooper who employed 41 adults and 26 children to produce china and parian figures.

By 1876 the Wards site had passed into the hands of R. Hobson and Co. and had been renamed Gladstone, after the politician William Ewart Gladstone.

The factory opened as a museum in 1974, the buildings having been saved from demolition in 1970 when the pottery closed (some ten years after its bottle ovens were last fired). In the 1990s ownership passed to Stoke-on-Trent City Council.

The museum has shown its commitment to industrial heritage by functioning as a working pottery. However, production has had to be curtailed for financial reasons and the museum is therefore less of a "living" museum than it was. As at 2014 the Middleport Pottery in Burslem, which is used for commercial production, is arguably the only working Victorian pottery in the city of Stoke-on-Trent.

== Process of making table-ware ==
The clay and ground bone were mixed in the sliphouse. Bowls, plates and saucers were pressed, jiggered and jolleyed or moulded from the slip. The green (un-fired) china was left to dry in the greenhouse. At the same time the saggars that would hold them in the kiln were made.

The bottle oven kiln is protected by an outer hovel, which helps to create an updraught. The biscuit kiln was filled with clay sealed saggars of green (un-fired) flatwares (bedded in flint) by placers. The doors (clammins) were bricked up and the firing began. Each firing took 14 tons of coal. Fires were lit in the firemouths and baited every four hours, flames rose up inside the kilns, heat passed between the bungs of saggars. They controlled the temperature of the firing using dampers in the crown. The temperature was gauged by watching the contraction of bullers rings (a pyrometric device placed in the kiln). A kiln would be fired to 1250C.

The biscuitwares are glazed. They fired again in the bigger glost kilns- again they are placed in sealed saggars, items separated by kiln furniture such as stints, saddles and thimbles. The table-ware would then be decorated by transfers or by painting and placed in the muffle kiln.

The enamel kiln (or muffle kiln) is of different construction- it fired at 700C. The pots were stacked on 7 or 8 levels of clay bats (shelves). The door was iron lined with brick.

When the kiln cooled the product was transported in basket and exported to different parts of the country and empire using the canal network and the ports on the River Mersey.

== Buildings ==
The museum is centred on the Roslyn pottery. It contains two biscuit ovens and two larger glost ovens. In addition are two enamel kilns. A tandem compound steam engine by Marshall & Sons, of Gainsborough, Lincolnshire is in place but it is turned by an electric motor. The two muffle kilns came from elsewhere.

== Displays ==
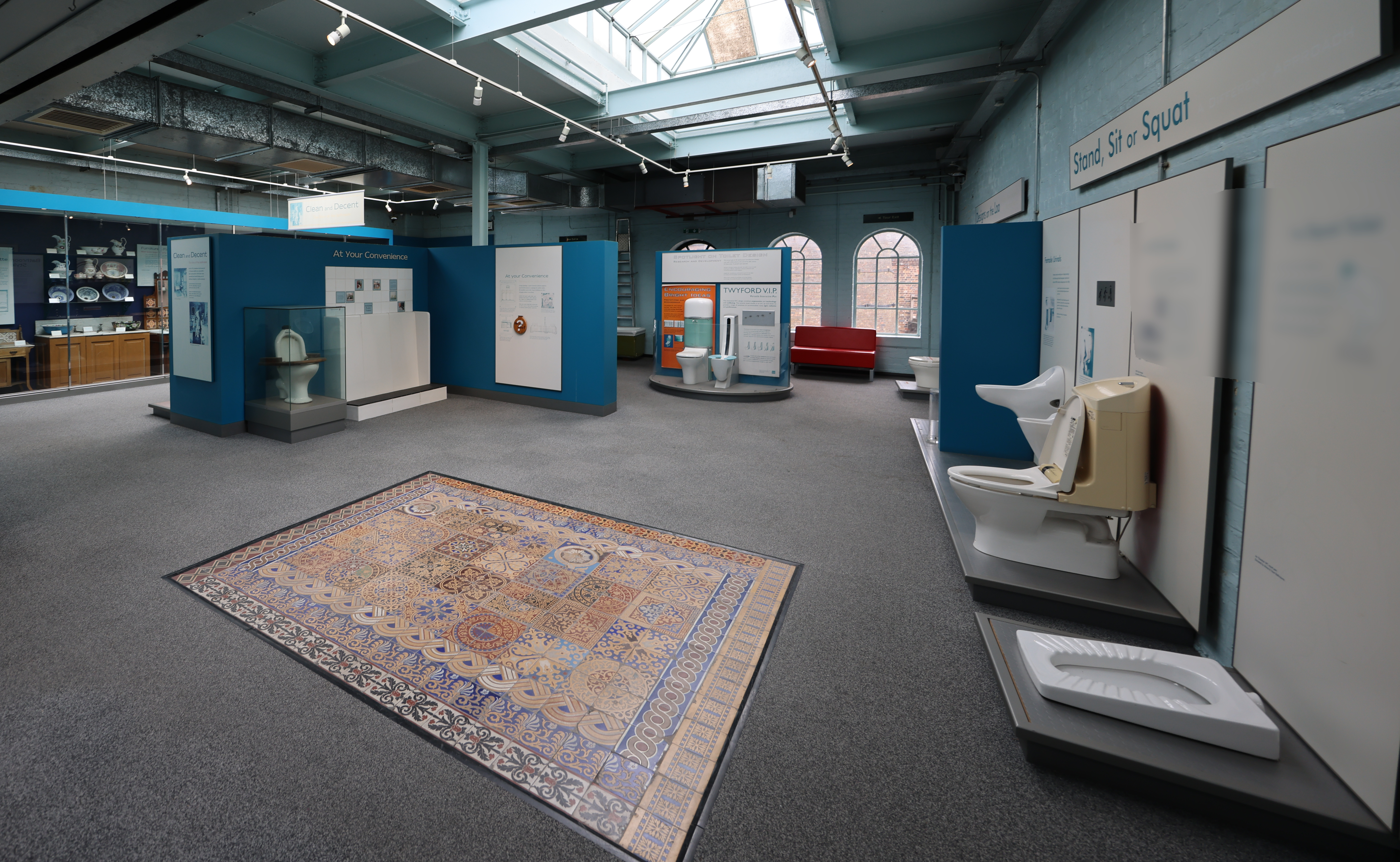
Part of the sanitary ware galleries

The museum allows the visitor to explore the bottle kilns and exhibits the principal ancillary rooms: the engine house, the slip room, saggar making workshop. It shows aspects of working with clay- including hands on displays of throwing, moulding and decorating. Colour and gilding is presented as interpretive panels.

There is a gallery explaining the history of the tile: how it was pressed glazed and decorated. In one tableau the "Gladstone Vase" by Frederick Alfred Rhead is displayed. (Note: The Gladstone Vase was decorated in pâte-sur-pâte. It was presented to W.E. Gladstone by the Liberals of Burslem in August 1888. Contemporary sources describe it as: "In the centre is a symbolic figure of Liberty seated on a dais, and holding in one hand the scales of justice and in the other a broken chain. On the right is Homer and on the left Dante offering a poet’s tribute. Next to the central figure on the left are figures of a vestal in a pleading attitude and a historian recording the deeds done in the name of freedom. On the back of the vase in the centre is a figure of St. George, supported on one side by William Wallace and on the other by Brian Boru. There are figures of Ireland with bowed heads and Poland with mournful look and hair unbound. There are also figures of saucy children and a maiden bringing offerings of flowers. The figures are executed in white on a blackish or bottle green ground, and the general ground of the vase is of heliotrope tint, with quiet ornamentation". It is on loan from the Gladstone family.)

There is also a gallery charting the history of sanitary ware, privies, earth closets and water closets.

The museum has a display of ceramics from the shipwreck of the Josephine Willis which sank in the 1850.

== In popular culture ==
Gladstone has seen its share of celebrity interest, from Tony Robinson filming for a BBC documentary 'The Worst Jobs in Britain' and from Alan Titchmarsh. It also has regular visits from the Blue Peter crew, and numerous children's TV programmes. In 1986, parts 13 and 14 of the Doctor Who serial The Trial of a Time Lord were shot at the museum. In the early 1990s it was featured on Noel's House Party with a live 'gunging' outside of the bottle kilns.

Gladstone Pottery Museum was featured on Living TV's popular series Most Haunted. It featured Yvette Fielding the shows host, and Gladstone’s Operations Manager, Ian Watson, who described various paranormal activity at the site. It has been the subject of many local paranormal groups interest throughout the years.

The museum featured in the third episode of the BBC One programme 24 Hours in the Past featuring six celebrities working in the Victorian era. The episode aired on 12 May 2015.

The Great Pottery Throw Down has been filmed on location there since 2020, having moved from Middleport Pottery.

In 2021, it was used as a regular location for Netflix series The Irregulars, based on the characters from the Arthur Conan Doyle Sherlock Holmes novels, and The Colour Room, about the local pottery designer Clarice Cliff.

== Celebrations and events ==
The museum holds annual events from Halloween ghosts walks and tours, to Christmas Carol concerts and seasonal festivals. It also caters for children with Easter egg hunts and summer pottery workshops.

== See also ==
- Burleigh Pottery

== Bibliography ==
- Historic England. "Gladstone Pottery Museum (Grade II*) (1195854)". National Heritage List for England.
