= Bottle oven =

Type of kiln

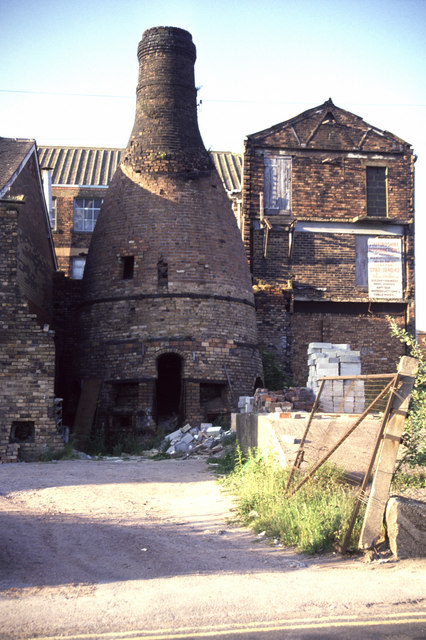
Bottle oven at Minkstone Works, Longton

A bottle oven or bottle kiln is a type of kiln. The word 'bottle' refers to the shape of the structure and not to the kiln's products, which are usually pottery.

Bottle kilns were typical of the industrial landscape of Stoke-on-Trent, where nearly 50 are preserved as listed buildings. They were mostly built in the later 18th and the 19th centuries, although the surviving ones include examples from the 20th century. Their association with Stoke-on-Trent reflects the fact that the British ceramic industry was mainly based in that city. Bottle kilns are found in other locations in England, for example at Coalport porcelain and the Fulham Pottery in London. Abroad they can be found at the Monastery of Santa Maria de las Cuevas.

Although the thermal efficiency of the bottle oven was low, with approximately 70% of the energy derived from fuel being lost as waste heat, these kilns remained the primary method of firing pottery until the mid-twentieth century. Their decline was ultimately precipitated by the Clean Air Act 1956 and a systemic transition within the industry away from coal-fired processes in favour of cleaner, alternatives such as gas tunnel kilns. Seven years were given from the passing of the act for bottle oven firings to cease and as a result firings stopped by the end of 1963. A single firing of pottery in a bottle oven was documented and recorded for posterity in 1978.

The continued use of bottle ovens for flint calcination at Furlong Mills in Burslem in Stoke-on-Trent, England is a rare survival of traditional industrial technology into the late 20th century. While the 1956 Clean Air Act effectively ended the use of coal-fired pottery ovens by the early 1960s, Furlong Mills successfully adapted its two calcining bottle ovens to meet modern environmental standards by switching from raw coal to smokeless fuel, specifically coke. These specialised kilns remained operational for the calcination of flint pebbles, heating them to approximately 1,000°C, well into the 1990s. This made Furlong Mills the last commercial site in the United Kingdom to use the bottle ovens.

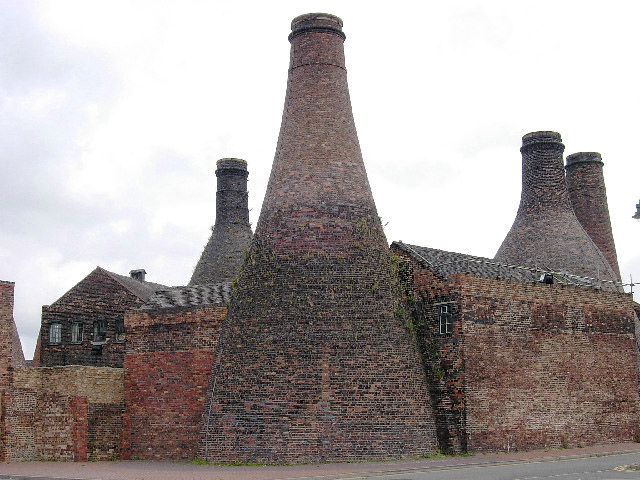
Exterior of bottle ovens at the Gladstone Pottery Museum that was formerly a pot-bank in Longton

== Description ==
A bottle oven is protected by an outer hovel which helps to create an updraught. The oven itself is inside the hovel and is cylindrical in shape with domed roof and foot (30cm) thick walls. The brick structure of the oven was reinforced with iron bands that ran around the circumference. More iron was used around the access door known as the wicket or clammin. At the base of the kiln there were a number of fire mouths.

A type known as the updraft stack oven dispensed with most of the hovel and mounted the chimney directly on top of the kiln. Another type known as downdraft bottle oven directed the hot gases back through the kiln before venting them through flues in the base of the oven. This made them more efficient and provided more even heating within the oven.

The enamel kiln (or muffle kiln) is of a different construction, with external flues, and was fired at 850C. The pots were stacked on seven or eight levels of batts, or refractory shelves. The door is iron lined with brick.

== Construction ==
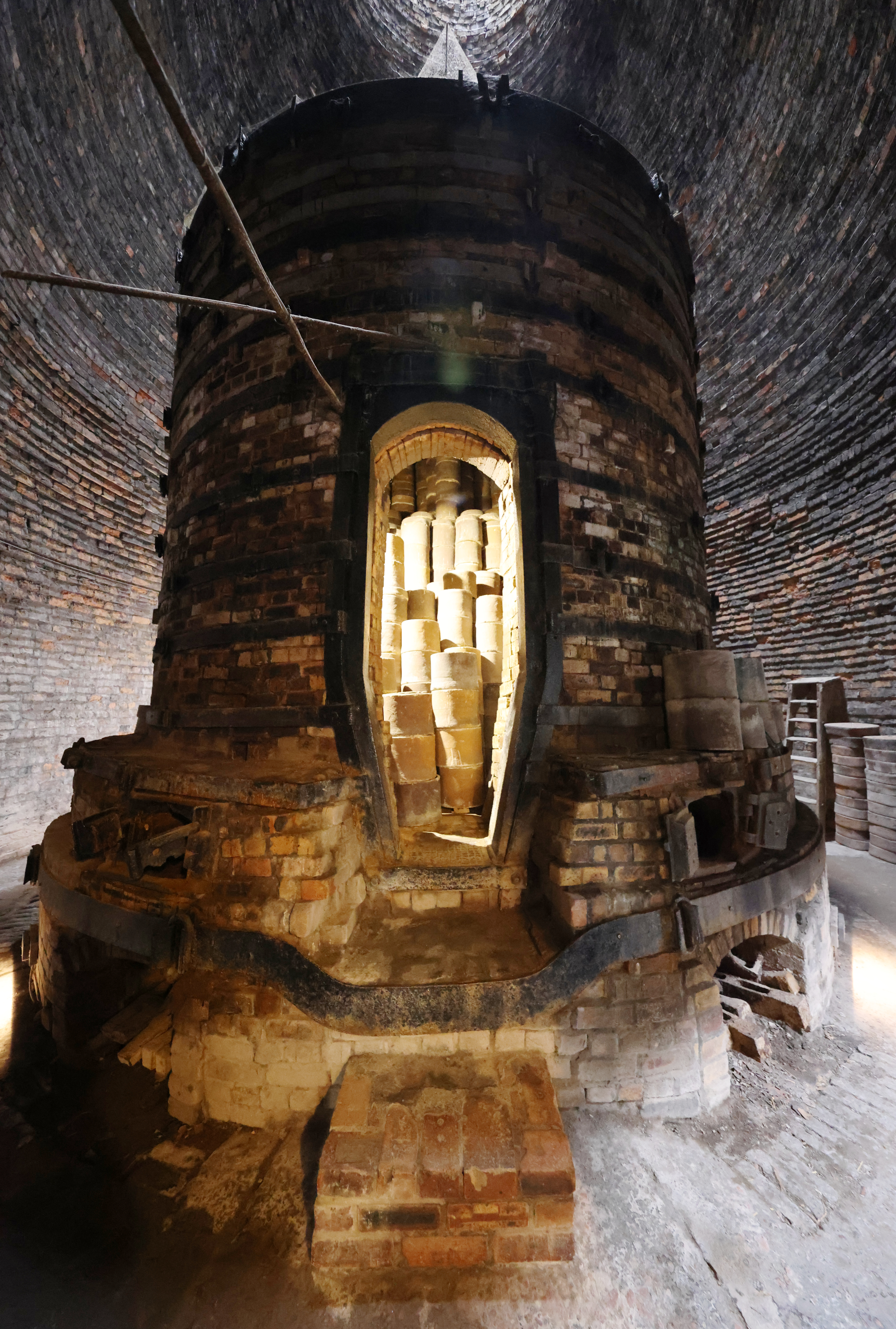
Looking at the kiln from inside the hovel

The internal walls of the kiln are constructed from brickwork approximately 300 mm thick, reinforced externally by iron bands known as "bonts". The structure comprises a circular chamber topped with a high, domed roof and a floor that rises slightly towards a central well-hole. Positioned around the internal circumference are several low brick chimneys, referred to as "bags".

Heating was achieved through coal fires situated beneath the structure and stoked via external firemouths. Flues extended from these firemouths beneath the floor to the central well-hole, radiating heat upwards through the base of the kiln. Simultaneously, the bags located directly above the firemouths served as internal conduits, directing the intense heat and flames from the fires up the walls to ensure even distribution.

The specific dimensions of a kiln, including its height and diameter, determined the total number of firemouths required. Access to the interior was provided by a "clammin", an opening sized to allow a placer (a worker carrying a saggar) to enter. These kilns were typically protected by an outer brick shell called a hovel, which could either stand as an independent structure.

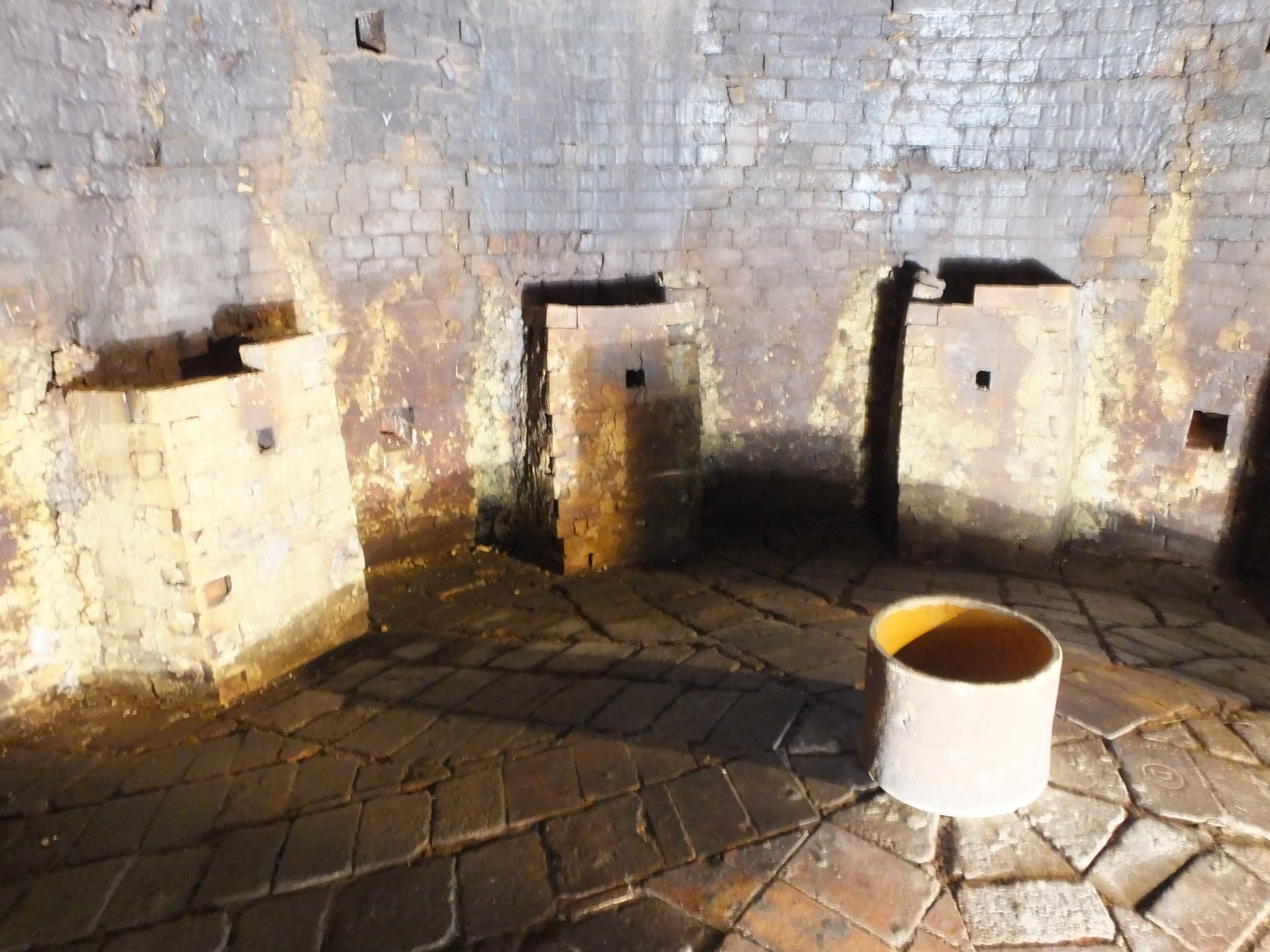
Kiln floor, the well-hole and bags

== Saggars ==
Each pot bank made its own saggars from fire clay. In the saggar maker's workshop, clay would be rolled around a wooded form by the saggar maker, while a lad would knock the bottom using a mawl and an iron mould. A saggar could be expected to last for around 40 firings after which it had to be replaced. During biscuit firing, (Note: Physical archive copy; details the industrial evolution of biscuit kilns and saggar placement.) tableware cups and bowls were put on a fine layer of calcined flint dust on the bottom of the saggar, while flatware was supported like a sandwich between layers of calcined flint powder. They had to be stacked carefully to prevent distortion during firing. Then the saggar was topped and sealed to prevent any fumes or kiln debris entering the saggar and discolouring the wares. During the second firing, the glost firing, the glazed ware was held by pins, saddles, spurs and thimbles, as any contact point would leave a blemish on the glaze. Sorting the thimbles for reuse was one of the lowest jobs in the potbank.

== Operation ==
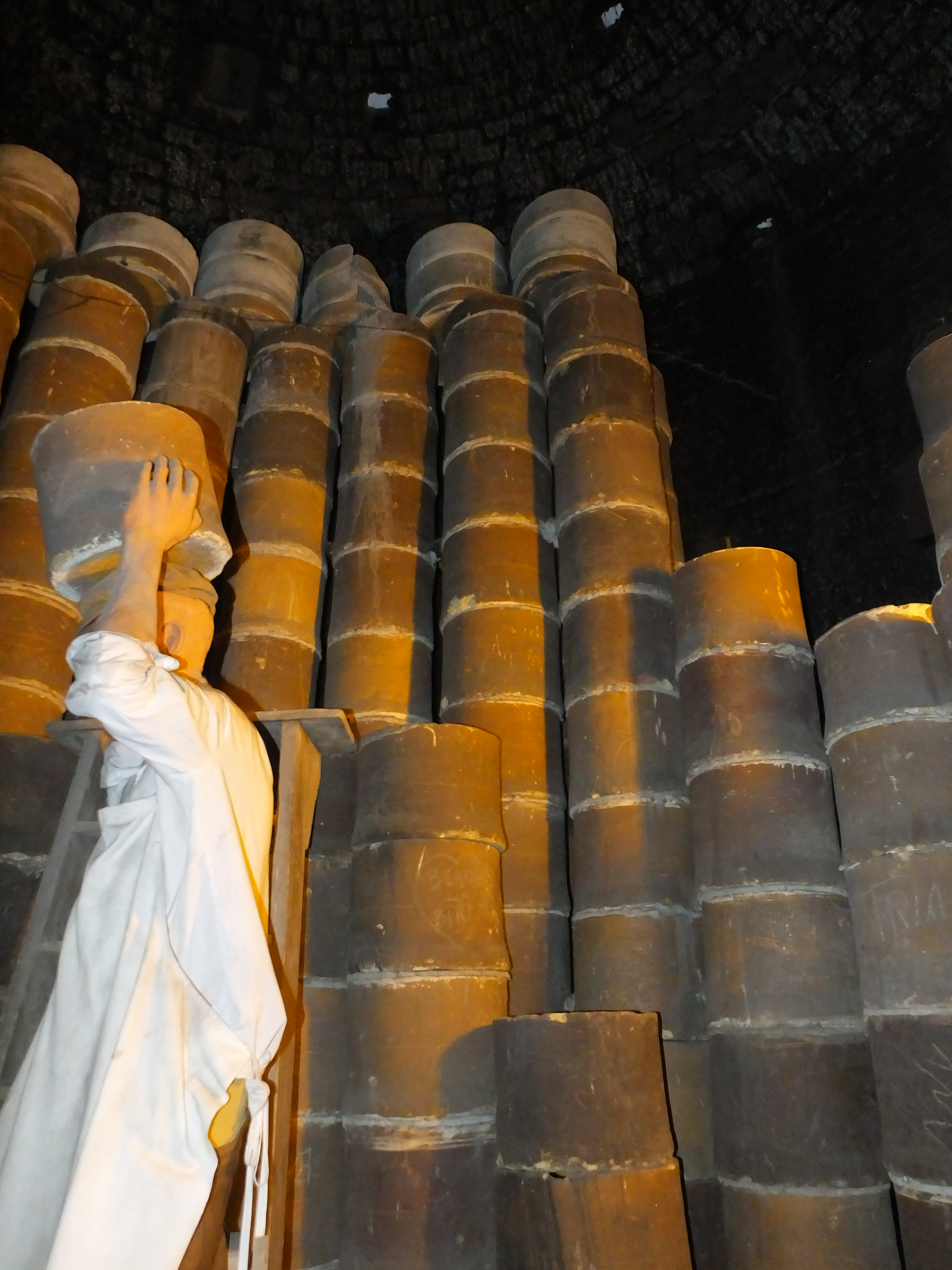
Bungs of saggars inside the kiln

The process of loading and unloading a bottle oven, known respectively as placing and drawing, was the specialised responsibility of workers termed placers. These labourers transferred unfired ceramic vessels, or greenware, from drying areas or glost shops into protective fireclay boxes called saggars. Once the ware was secured, the saggars were sealed and carried into the bottle oven balanced upon the placers' heads; a laden saggar typically weighed approximately 25 kilogrammes.

Inside the oven, saggars were arranged in vertical columns known as bungs, positioned strategically to shield the most delicate items from direct heat. Each bung reached a height of twelve or thirteen units, often topped with newly moulded, unfired saggars. A specific arrangement called the pipe-bung was constructed directly over the central well-hole of the oven; this column consisted of bottomless saggars that functioned as a chimney to facilitate the draught required for combustion.

After the kiln was fully packed, the entrance, or clammins, was bricked shut. A single aperture, or spyhole, was left open to allow the firemen to monitor Buller’s rings, which served as indicators to gauge the internal temperature during the firing process.

The potbank employed a cod placer to supervise the work, but placers who were paid by the job used to wait outside the potbanks for work. Drawing would be done 48 hours after firing finished but in hard times placers were sent into a kiln that was still glowing red after 24. The men wore five layers of clothing and wet cloths over their heads. Life expectancy for a placer was low.

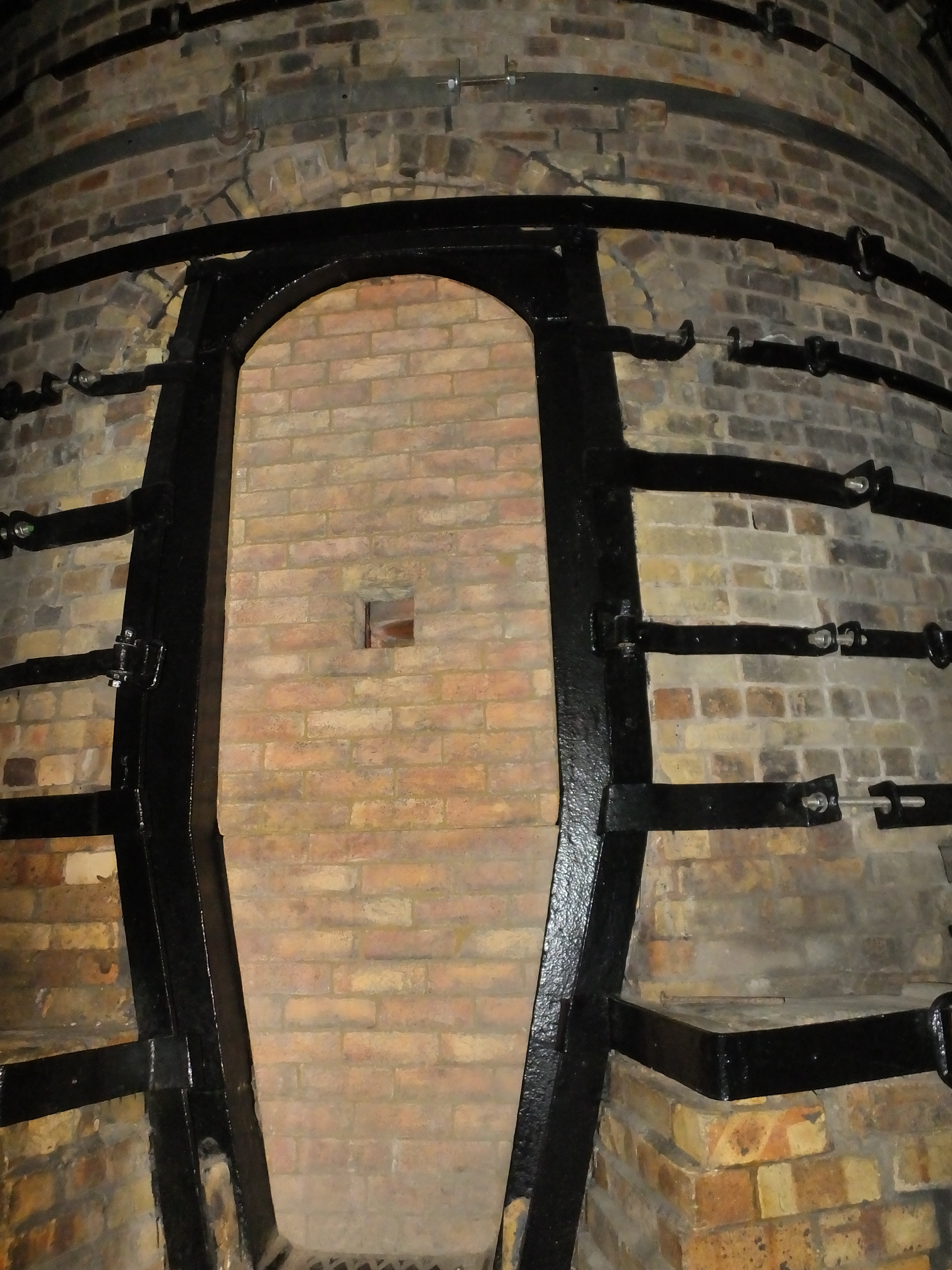
The clammin bricked up ready for firing

A bottle oven would typically be fired once a week. The fires were set in each of the firemouths by the firemen. Once alight the kiln would be heated slowly as the moisture was burned out of the clay, this was known as "smoking". Then the kiln would be taken to full temperature, and kept there for three hours then allowed to cool. A biscuit firing took three days and a glost firing took two days. After 48 hours the kiln had cooled sufficiently to be drawn by the placers, and the wares checked. The placers' earnings were dependent on the success of the firing.

Each firing would use 14 tons (13 tonnes) of coal. It was very energy inefficient, a 1937 British Pottery Manufactures Federation publication stated that in an updraught oven only 11% of the energy produced by burning the coal heated the saggers and the pottery they contained. Coal burning is a very dirty process; the smoke from a bottle kiln would eddy around the kiln top, and curl down to ground level either into the yard of the pot bank or into the streets and houses around.

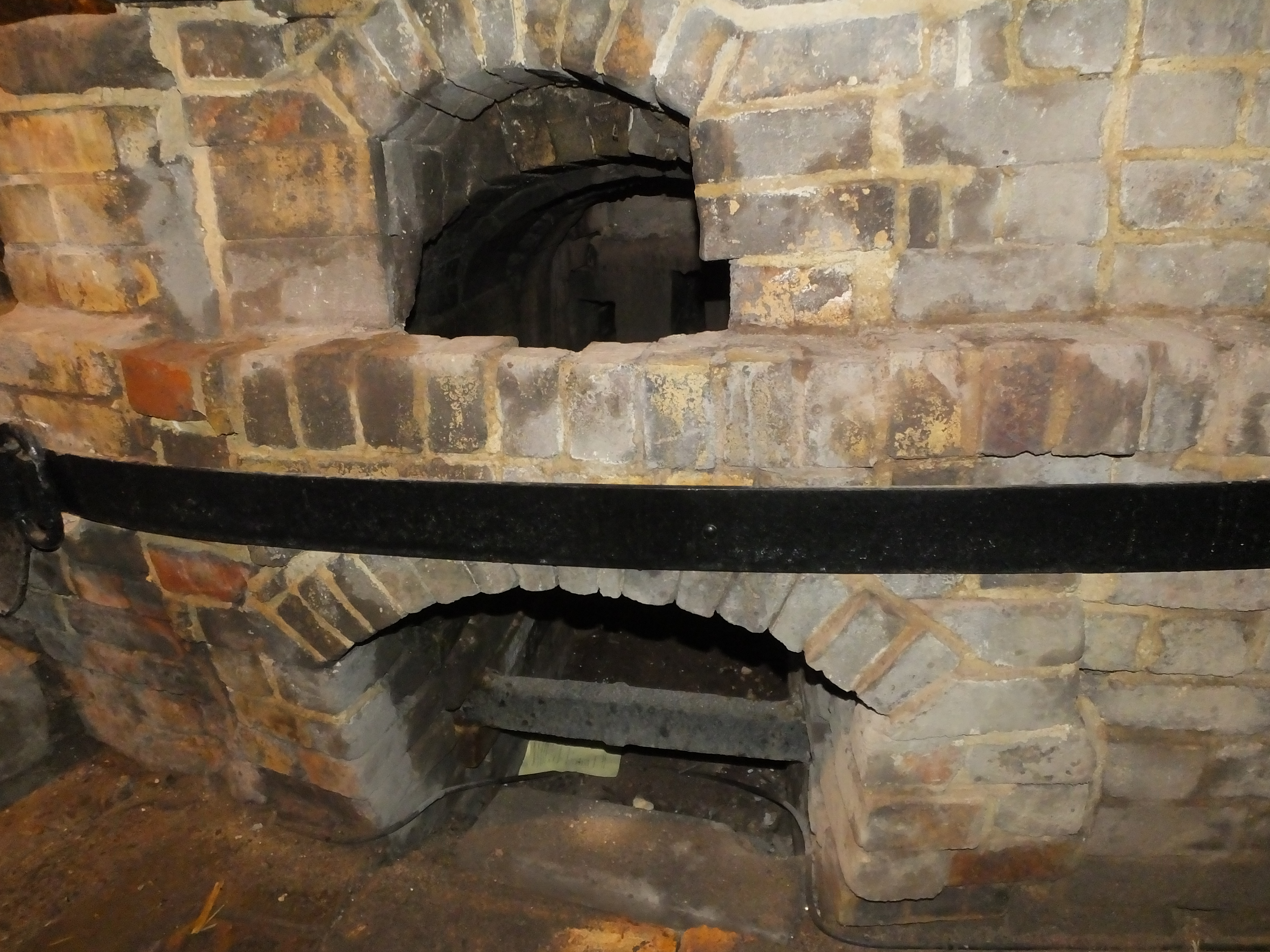
A firemouth (in museum conditions)

== Preservation ==
There are 47 standing bottle ovens in Stoke-on-Trent, all are now listed buildings. The largest group is to be found in Longton within its conservation area which protects a number of 19th century pottery works.

Bottle ovens open to the public include those at:

- Gladstone Pottery Museum in Longton. Stoke-on-Trent.
- Sharpe's Pottery Museum in Swadlincote, Derbyshire.
- The Middleport Pottery, Burslem, Stoke-on-Trent.
- The Coalport China Museum, part of Shropshire's Ironbridge Gorge.

=== Regeneration ===
The condition of some of Longton's historic buildings has been deteriorating, and to reverse this a Heritage Action Zone was designated in 2017. These zones aim to breathe "new life into old places", and this particular one, the Stoke-on-Trent Ceramic Heritage Action Zone is intended to have a double function of regenerating Longton and surviving bottle ovens throughout the city.
