= Leather-hard =

Partially dried clay

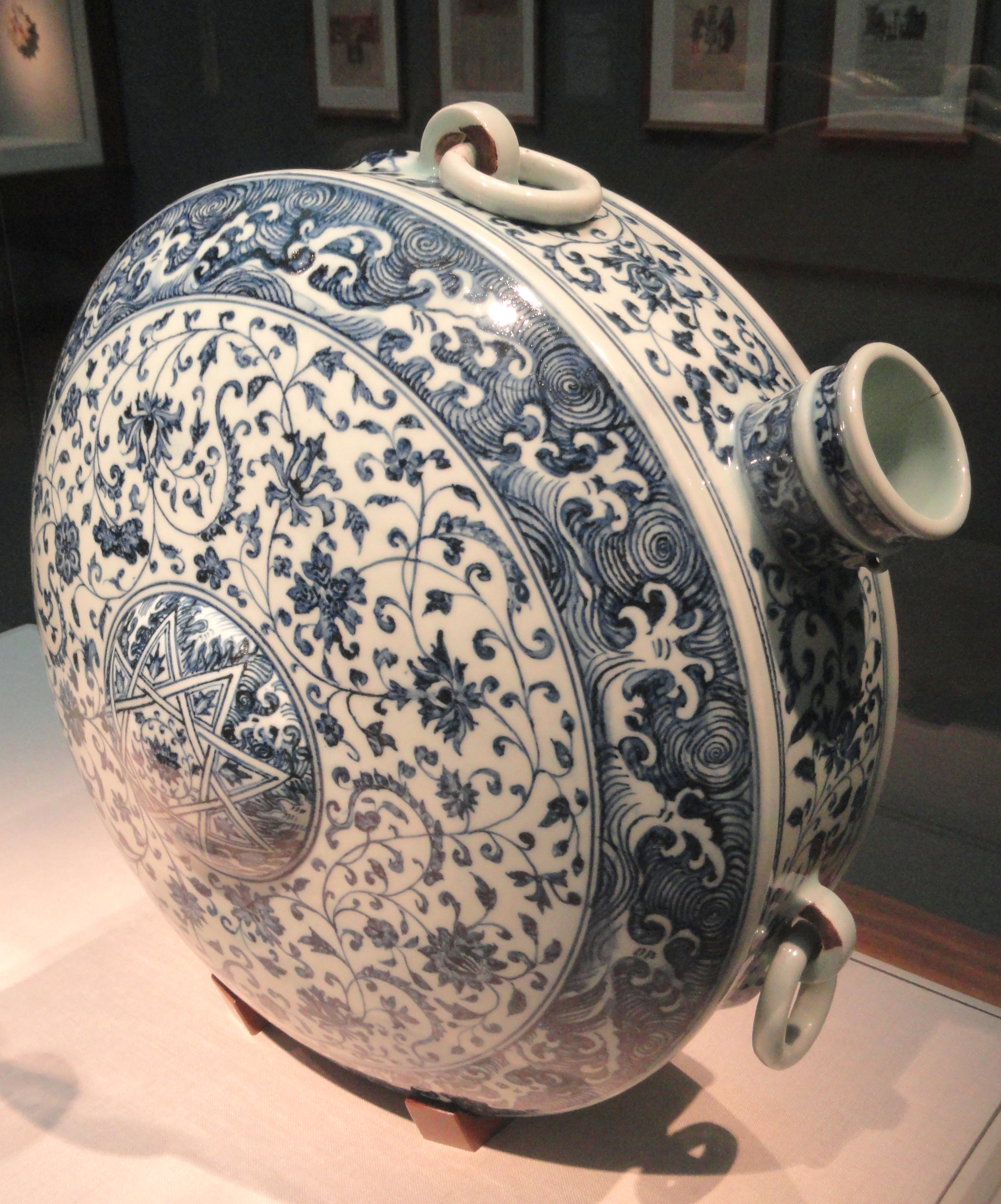
Canteen, China, Jiangxi Province, 15th century, porcelain with cobalt under colorless glaze. As with nearly all Chinese blue and white porcelain, this was painted when leather-hard, and probably the spout and rings were added.

In pottery, leather-hard is the condition of a clay or clay body when it has been partially dried to a consistency similar to leather of the same thickness as the clay. At this stage, the clay object has approximately 15% moisture content. The clay is still visibly damp (normally a darkish grey, if it began whiteish) but has dried enough to be able to be handled without deformation. The body is able to be gouged or incised without breaking.

The leather-hard stage is the easiest place to add on extension material that cannot be dried with the rest of the pot without causing some issues to occur. For instance, in some cases when handles are added before the base and sides have been dried, the handle can dry before the sides do and cause cracking, as the weight of the dried portion is no longer at the same equivalence with the wet side. The same goes for other additions to the pot that will not dry at the same rate as the rest of the pot. These include bases that are not the same shape as the rest of the vessel, hand-built additions, or decorations on the sides.

The leather-hard stage is a critical time in a clay body's drying process. Without getting it to a stage where most water is gone from the surface, the future ceramic is much more likely to crack or blow up in the firing. This additional step in the drying process also allows for a certain room for error. In the leather-hard stage, the clay can be returned to a plastic form by adding water. The certain amount of water is determined by its water of plasticity level. The water of plasticity is determined when the clay is at optimal plasticity, which means that it can be shaped by hand or wheel without it becoming too wet to hold together. This nature of the leather-hard state is what allows for it to be a safety net for both novice and experienced potters who want to ensure that no vessel is ruined in a fire when it could have been prevented by drying it in sunlight or in a space with uniform humidity and temperature first.

The leather-hard stage is the best for carving decorations onto the vessel as well. This will not crack the pot, but it also will not require trying to force the clay apart while still wet. It is possible to change the perception of the texture of the pot during this stage by either highlighting the clay's natural textures, or by smoothing over to make it into a pore smooth finish. These decorations are often how scene depictions are shown on a vessel. Glazes or ceramic glaze and paints may be subject to higher wear with use, whereas carved decorations will last as long as the vessel itself. Decorations on vessels have been a common trend throughout the history of ceramics.

Other processes that can occur while the pot is in the leather-hard state include both glazes and slips. Slips can form when water is added to clay at a level higher than the rate of plasticity. However, one must be careful when working with slips as it is a fine, silica based material that could be hazardous if inhaled. This can add a layered effect onto the pottery itself. Glazes are a glassy coating that can be applied like a paint to a vessel when it is either leather-hard or briefly fired. When glazes are applied in the leather-hard stage, they tend to run less risk of cracking the pot when they are fired. However, there are still instances when the glaze will crack no matter what is done to prevent it due to any number of changes that could happen during a firing. When the pots have been fired before the glazes are put on, they are referred to as biscuits. Although leather-hard and biscuit may seem similar, only a leather-hard vessel can return to a plastic state. In fact, a biscuit vessel, while looking similar to the leather-hard vessel, has fired to around 1652–2012°F, and is therefore a fired ceramic, not unfired clay. Another process that can occur while a vessel is in the leather-hard state is to fettle the vessel. This refers to what happens when trimming is done to the edges or casting marks that are on the pot from the initial molding of the vessel, allowing it to gain a smoother texture.

While in the leather-hard stage, vessels can be modified to give extra desired characteristics. One additional aspect to a vessel that can be made is to make the vessel into a lute. This refers to two pieces of leather-hard clay placed together with a slip acting as a glue. Lutes increase the overall strength of the pot, which allows it to withstand more stress. This stress can be measured on a stress–strain curve. Another aspect that can be added to a leather-hard state a process referred to as burnishing. This is produced when a hard object, often a highly polished stone or glass, is rubbed on the surface of a leather-hard vessel. Burnishing smooths all the clay particles into facing the same direction, allowing light to reflect off them. Polishing is similar to burnishing, but instead of trying forcing the particles of the clay into facing the same direction, it smooths over the edges to make it glossier in nature without an actual glaze. This gives rise to similar styles but ultimately is not as stylized as burnishing. Another option is combing—the use of a tool scraped down the side of a vessel to make indentations that are uniform throughout the vessel in width and length.
