= Slip (ceramics) =

Slurry of clay and water

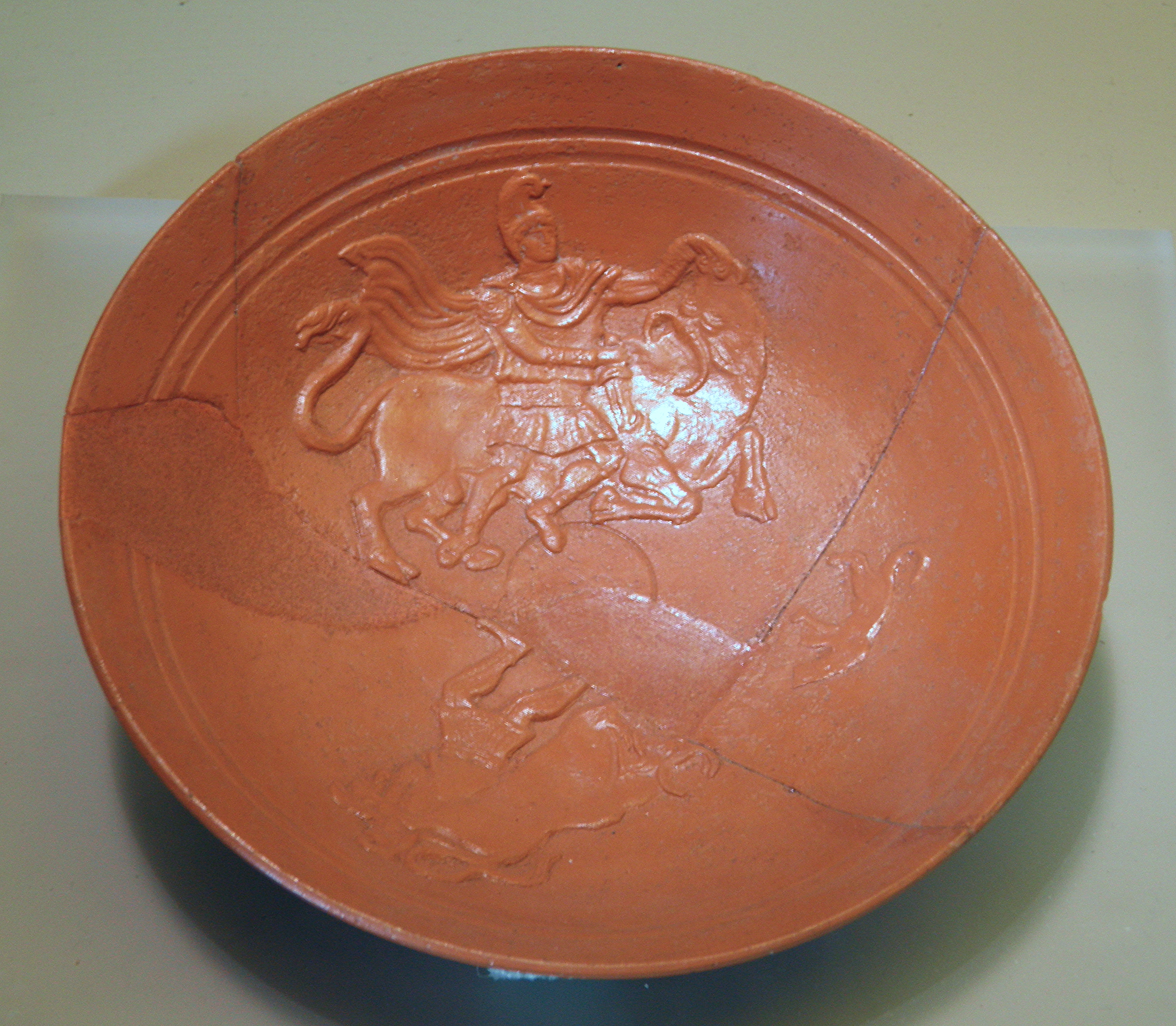
African red slip ware: moulded Mithras slaying the bull, 400 ± 50 AD.

A slip is a clay slurry used to produce pottery and other ceramic wares. Liquified clay, in which there is no fixed ratio of water and clay, is called slip or clay slurry which is used either for joining leather-hard (semi-hardened) clay body (pieces of pottery) together by slipcasting with mould, glazing or decorating the pottery by painting or dipping the pottery with slip. Pottery on which slip has been applied either for glazing or decoration is called slipware.

Engobe, from the French word for slip, is a related term for a liquid suspension of clays and flux, in addition to fillers and other materials. This is in contrast to slips, which are historically considered to be a liquid suspension of only clay or clays in water.

Engobes are commonly used in the ceramic industry, typically to mask the appearance of the underlying clay body. They can be sprayed onto pieces in a similar method to glaze and through the addition of coloring oxides they can achieve a wide variety of colors, though not with the same vibrancy as glazes. Among artists engobes are often confused with slip, and the term is sometimes used interchangeably.

== Usage ==
=== Joining and molding ===
An additive with deflocculant properties, such as sodium silicate, can be added to disperse the raw material particles. This allows a higher solids content to be used, or allows a fluid to be produced with a minimal amount of water so that drying shrinkage is minimised, which is important during slipcasting. Usually the mixing of slip is undertaken in a blunger although it can be done using other types of mixers or even by hand.

- To join sections of unfired ware or greenware, such as handles and spouts.
- To fix into place pieces of relief decoration produced separately, for example by moulding. This technique is known as sprigging; an example is Jasperware.
- When slip is used to join two pieces of greenware together, it is generally used with a technique known as scratch and slip, whereby the contact points on both pieces are scored with multiple criss-crossing lines and slip painted on one piece over the scores.

=== Decoration and protection ===
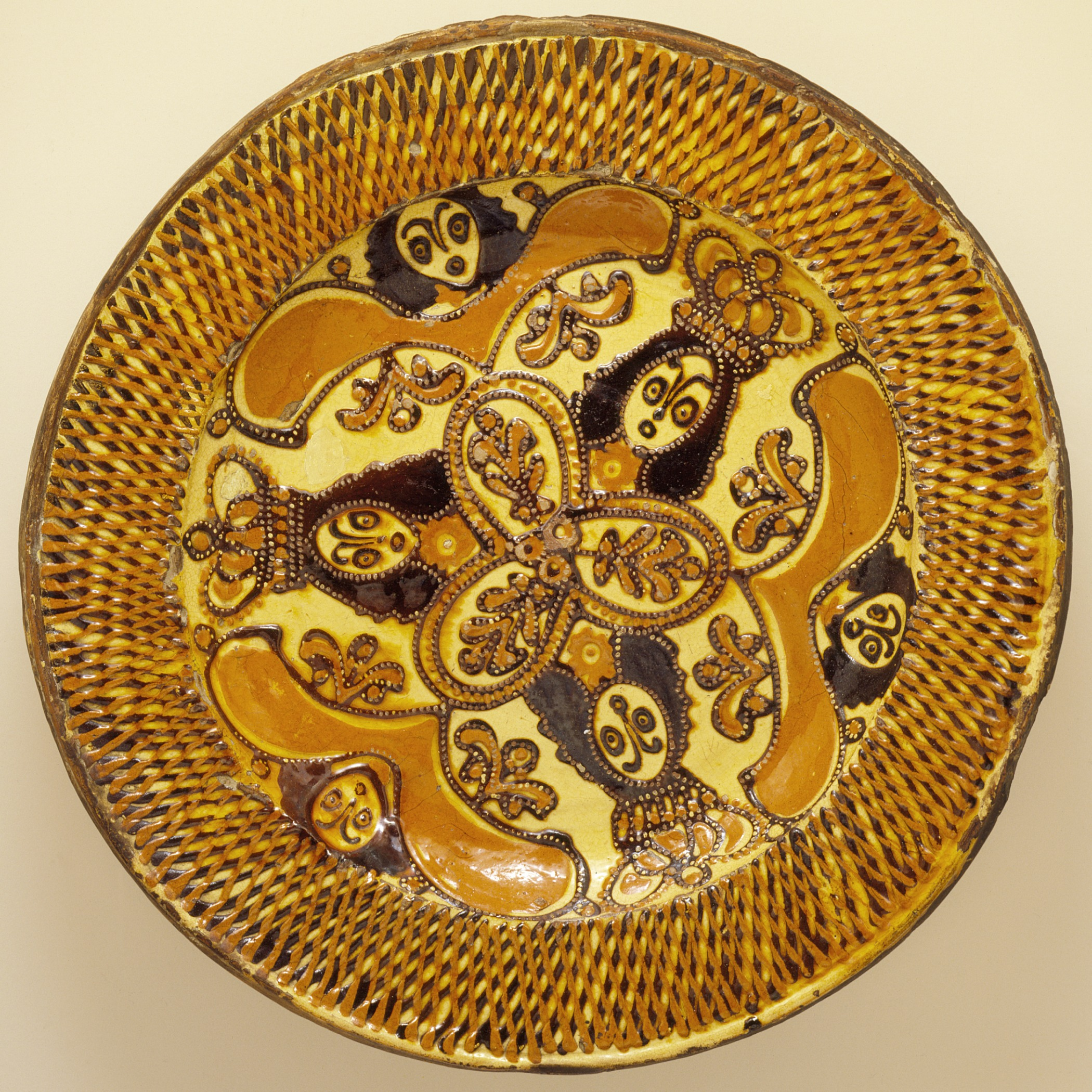
Charger with Charles II in the Boscobel Oak, English, c. 1685. The plate's diameter is 43 cm; such large plates, for display rather than use, take slip-trailing to an extreme, building up lattices of thick trails of slip.

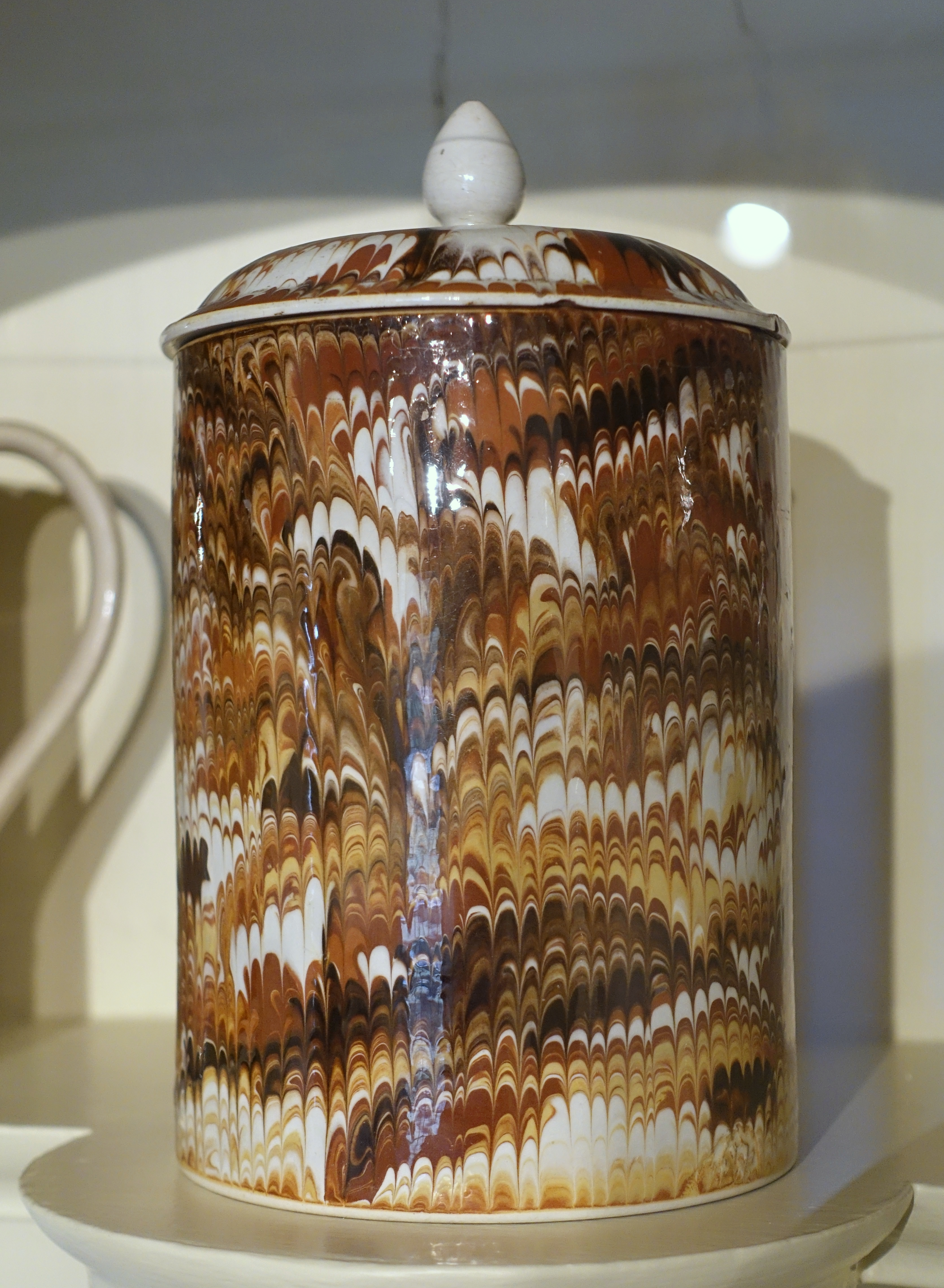
Chinese porcelain sugar bowl with combed, slip-marbled decoration, c. 1795

Slipware is pottery decorated by slip placed onto a wet or leather-hard clay body surface by dipping, painting or splashing. Some slips will also give decreased permeability, though not as much as a ceramic glaze would give. Often only pottery where the slip creates patterns or images will be described as slipware, as opposed to the many types where a plain slip is applied to the whole body, for example most fine wares in Ancient Roman pottery, such as African red slip ware (note: "slip ware" not "slipware"). Decorative slips may be a different colour than the underlying clay body or offer other decorative qualities such as a shiny surface.

Selectively applying layers of colored slips can create the effect of a painted ceramic, such as in the black-figure or red-figure pottery styles of Ancient Greek pottery. Slip decoration is an ancient technique in Chinese pottery also, used to cover whole vessels over 4,000 years ago. Principal techniques include slip-painting, where the slip is treated like paint and used to create a design with brushes or other implements, and slip-trailing, where the slip, usually rather thick, is dripped onto the body. Slip-trailed wares, especially if Early Modern English, are called slipware.

Chinese pottery also used techniques where patterns, images or calligraphy were created as part-dried slip was cut away to reveal a lower layer of slip or the main clay body in a contrasting colour. The latter of these is called the "cut-glaze" technique.

Slipware may be carved or burnished to change the surface appearance of the ware. Specialized slip recipes may be applied to biscuit ware and then refired.

Barbotine (another French word for slip) covers different techniques in English, but in the sense used of late 19th-century art pottery is a technique for painting wares in polychrome slips to make painting-like images on pottery.

=== Other uses in pottery ===
A slip may be made for various other purposes in the production and decoration of ceramics, such as slip can be used to mix the constituents of a clay body.

== Gallery ==
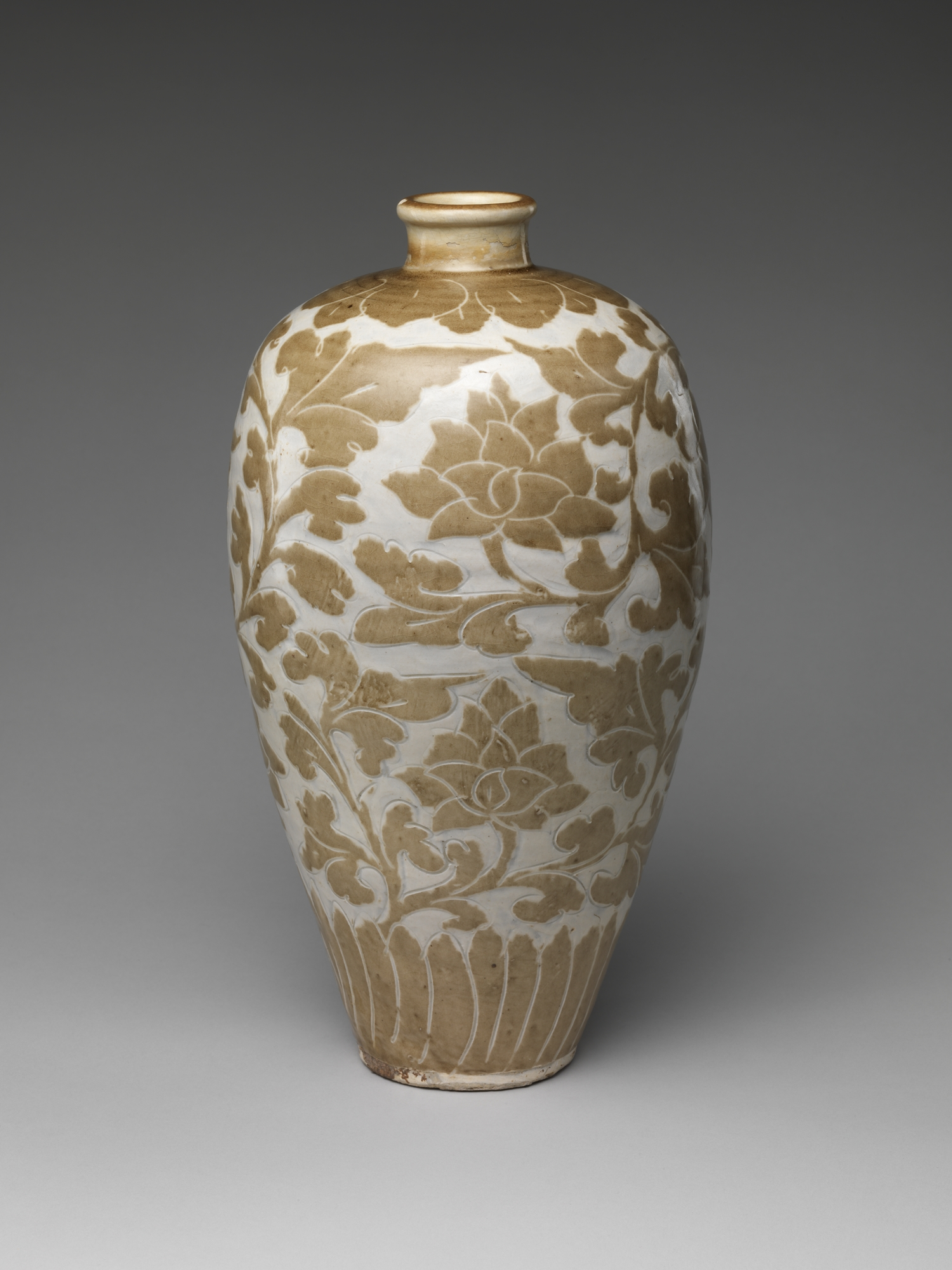
Chinese Cizhou ware vase with cut-glaze decoration

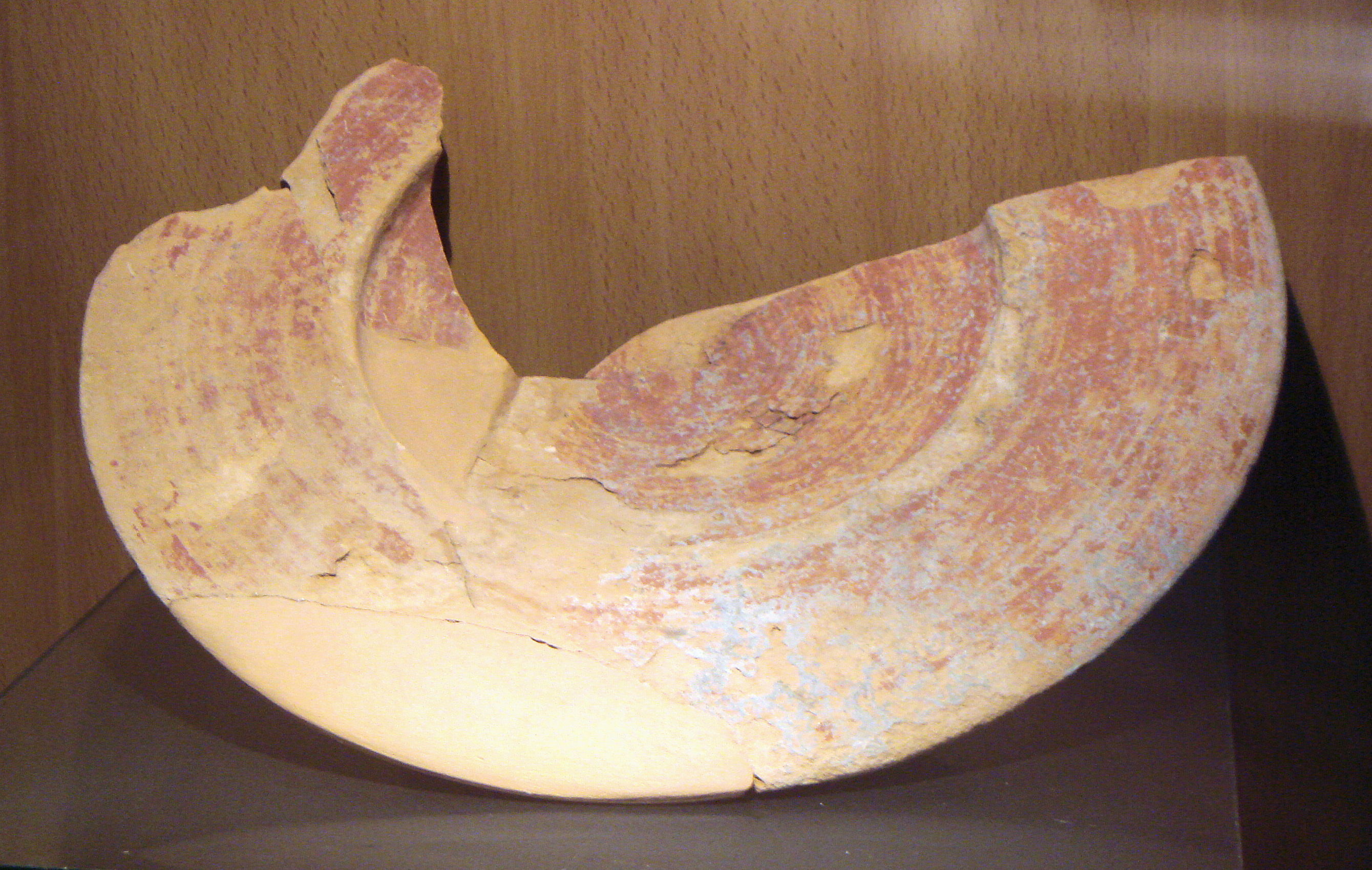
Phoenician plate with red slip, now wearing away, 7th century BC, excavated at Mogador Island near Essaouira

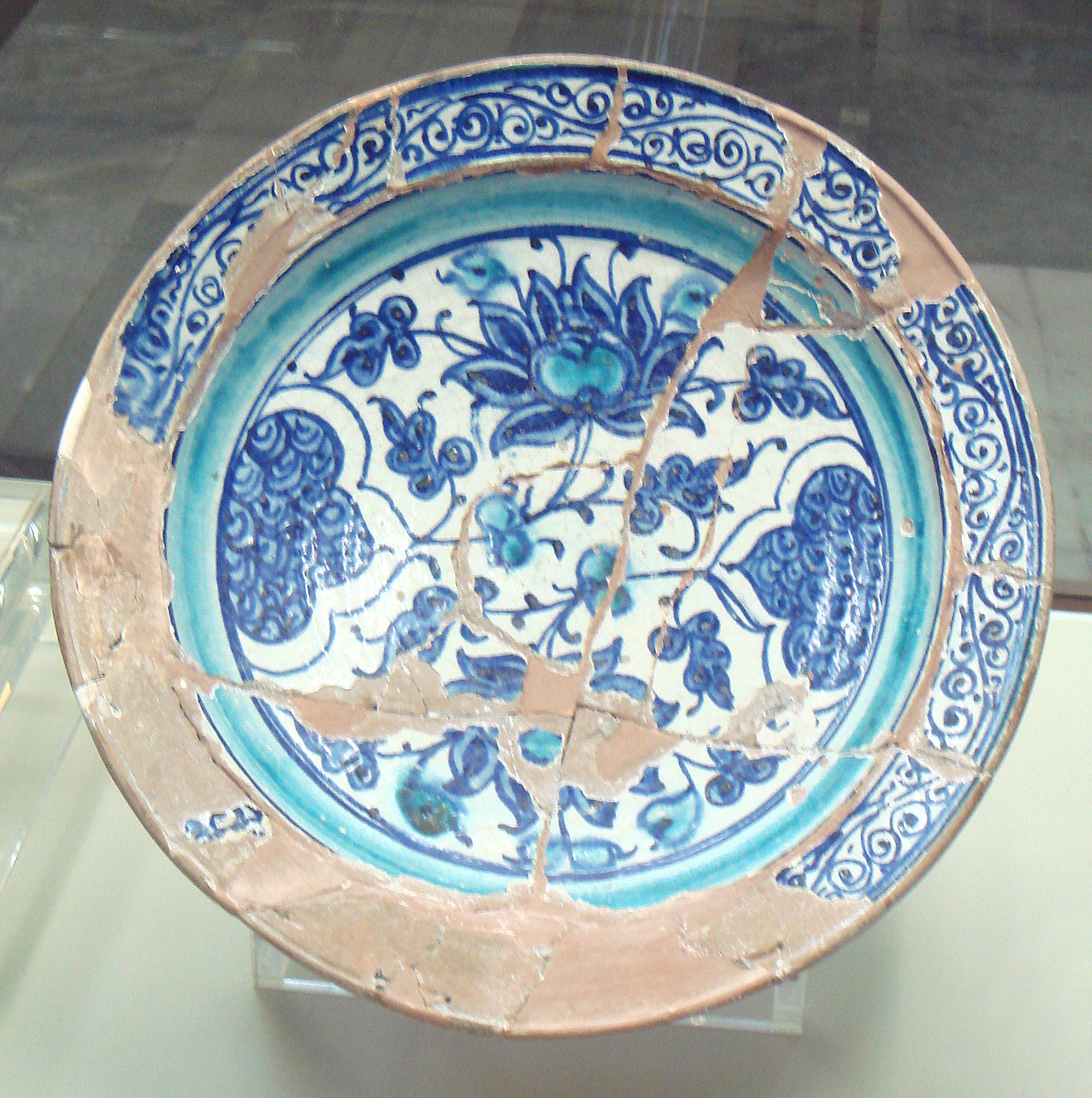
Miletus ware showing a red body covered by white slip, then painted in blue, c. 1400, Turkey

== See also ==
- Ceramics
- Ceramic glazes
- Glossary of pottery terms
- Porcelain
- Pottery
- Slipware
