= Miletus ware =

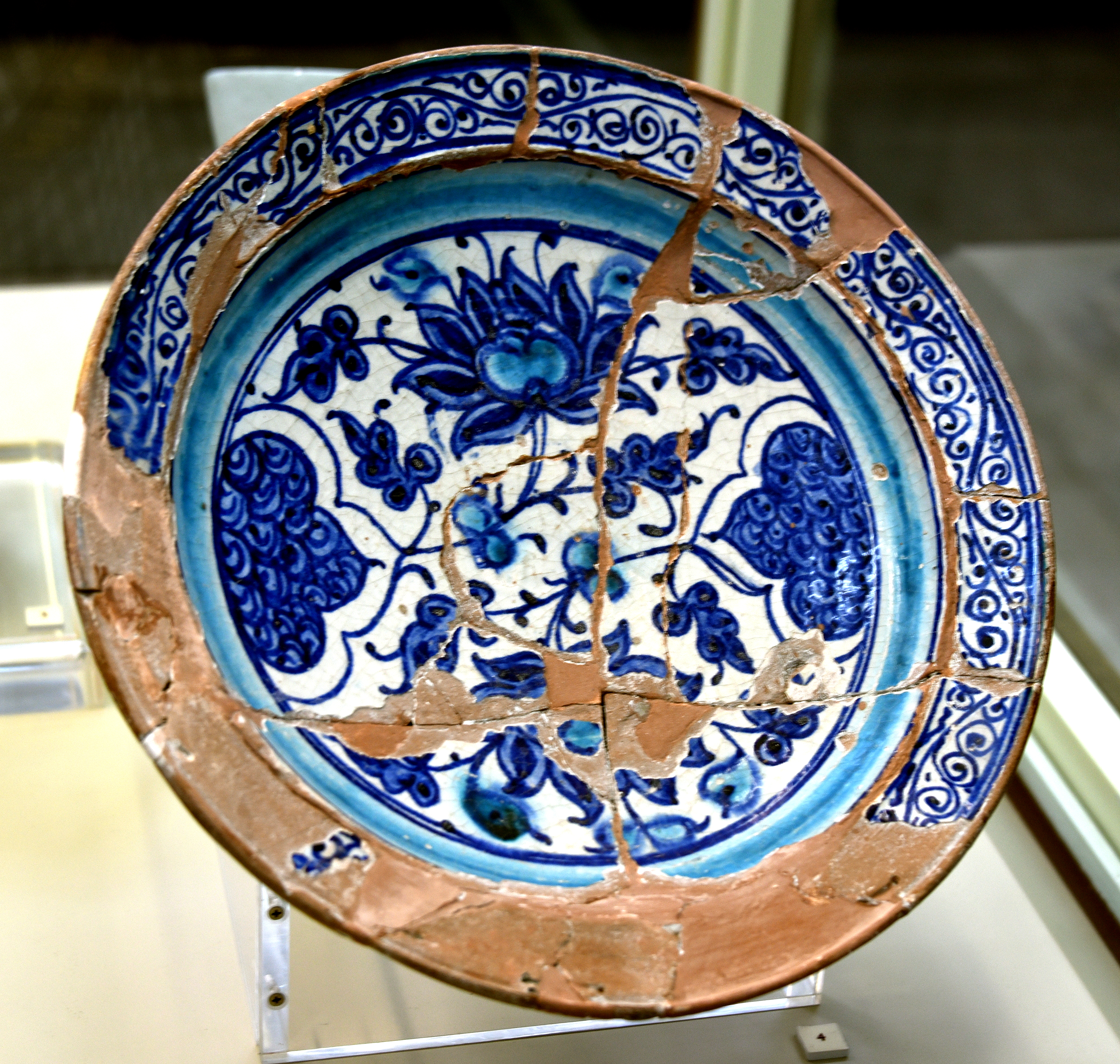
Plate excavated at İznik, c. 1400

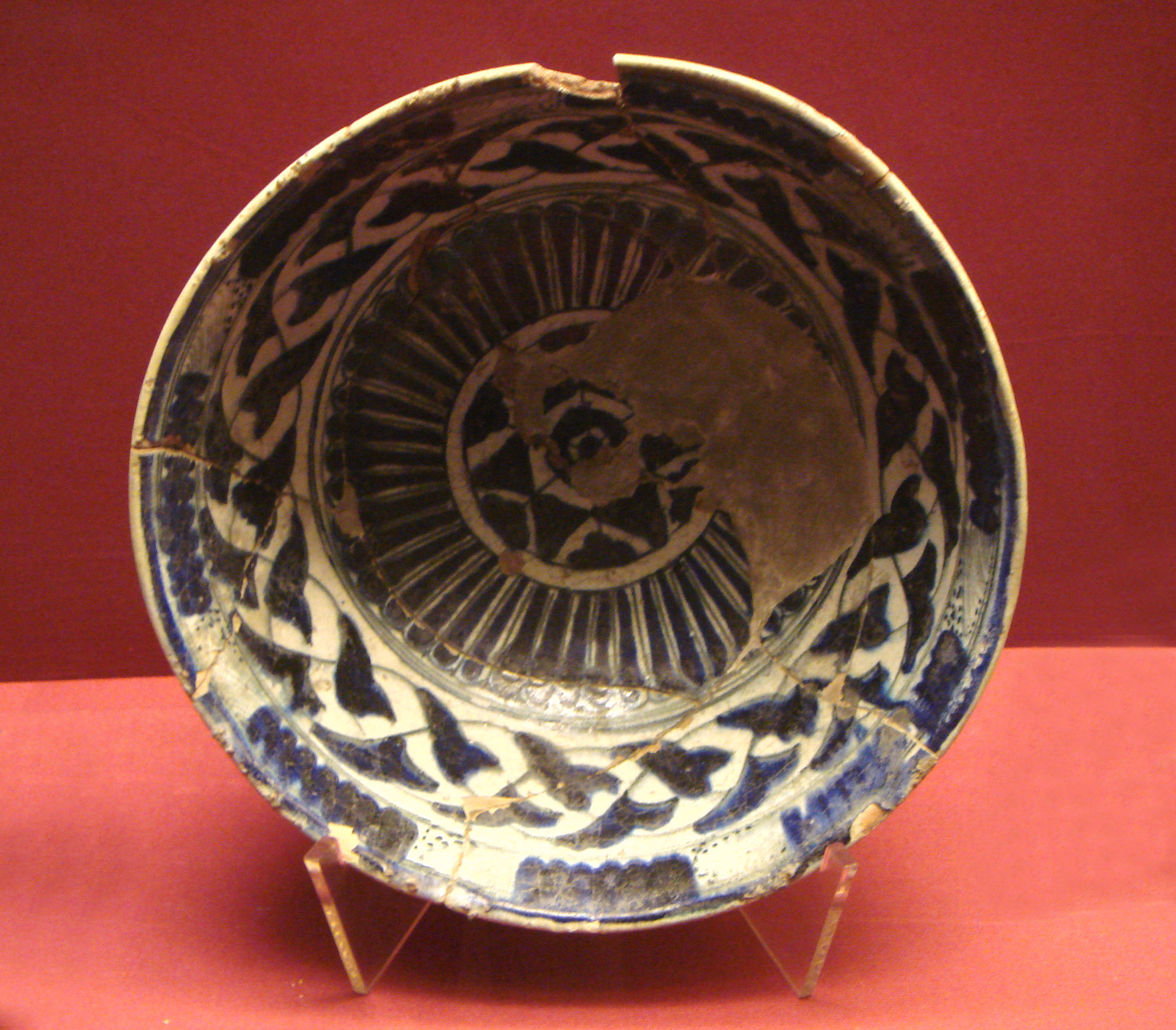
İznik pottery, "Miletus ware", 14-15th century. Turkish and Islamic Arts Museum.

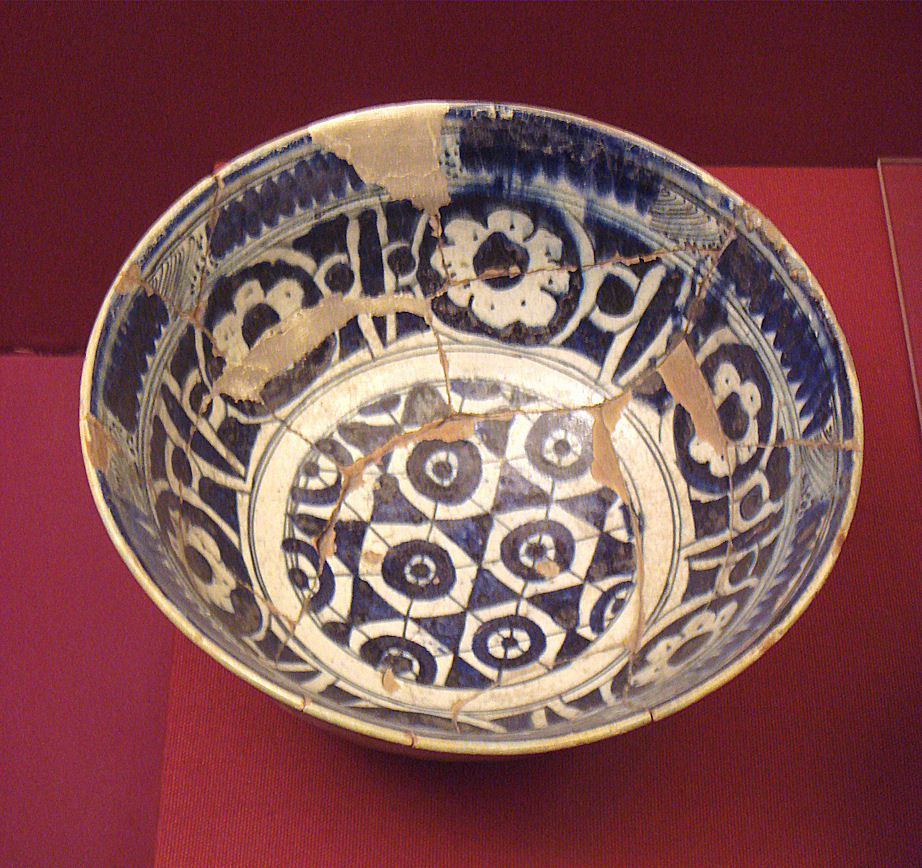
İznik pottery, "Miletus ware", 15th century. Turkish and Islamic Arts Museum.

Miletus ware is a type of pottery that was produced in various locations in Anatolia between the late 14th and mid 15th centuries. The pottery type was excavated in quantity in the 1930s by Friedrich Sarre at Balat, Didim, ancient Miletus, hence the ware's name. It has long been realized that this pottery type was not produced at Balat, but in other towns such as İznik, the main centre, and Kütahya.

Miletus ware used red clay as a base, covered with white slip, with simple designs in blue, turquoise and purple, and a clear lead glaze on top. The shapes were mostly bowls or deep dishes. The painted designs often incorporated "sunburst" and vegetal patterns.

Miletus ware was superseded in the later 15th century by Iznik pottery, with the introduction of white bodies instead of the red clays. However, there is a certain continuity in the colours used for the decoration.

== Gallery ==
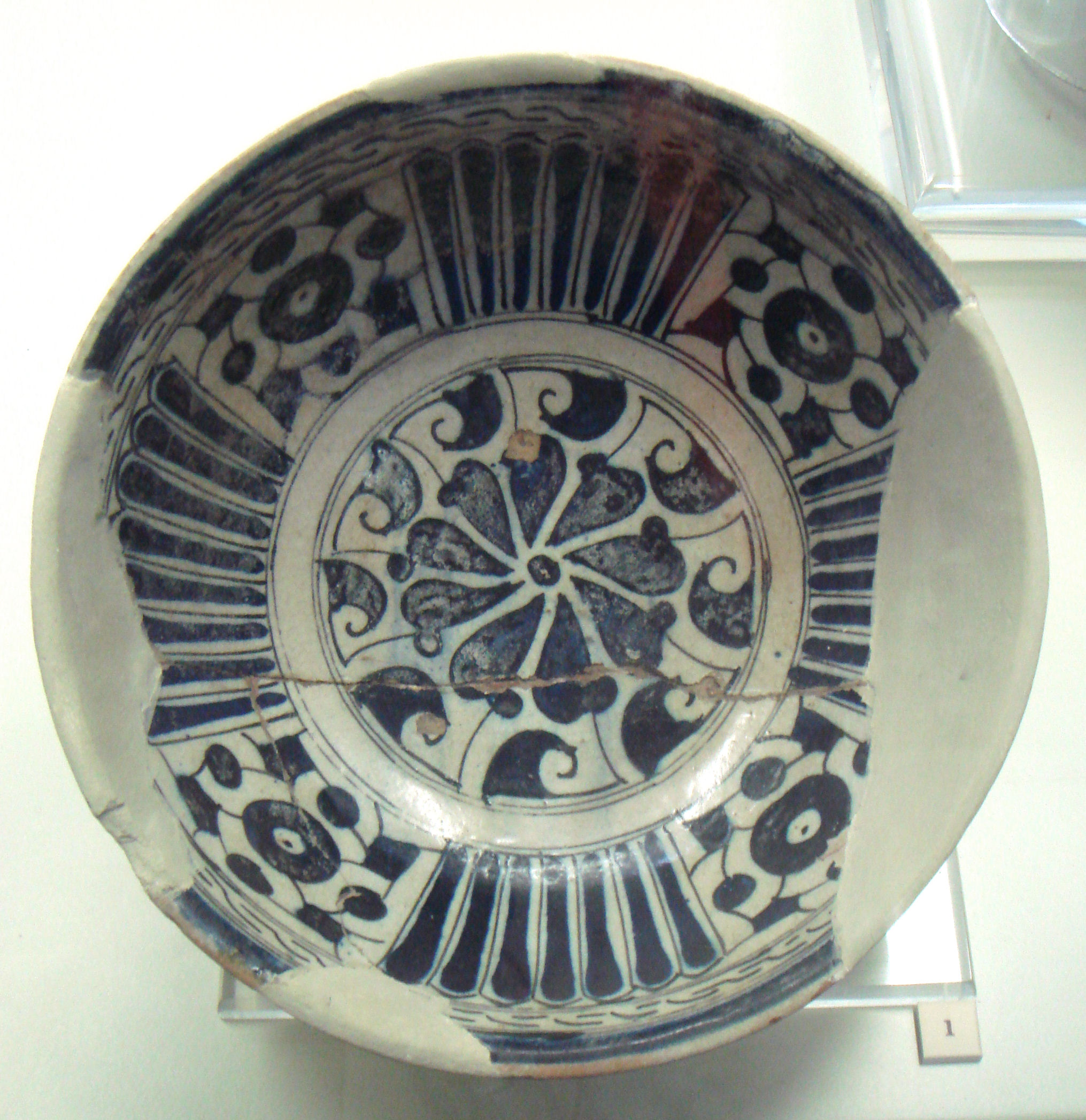
Blue and white Miletus ware. Istanbul Archaeology Museums.

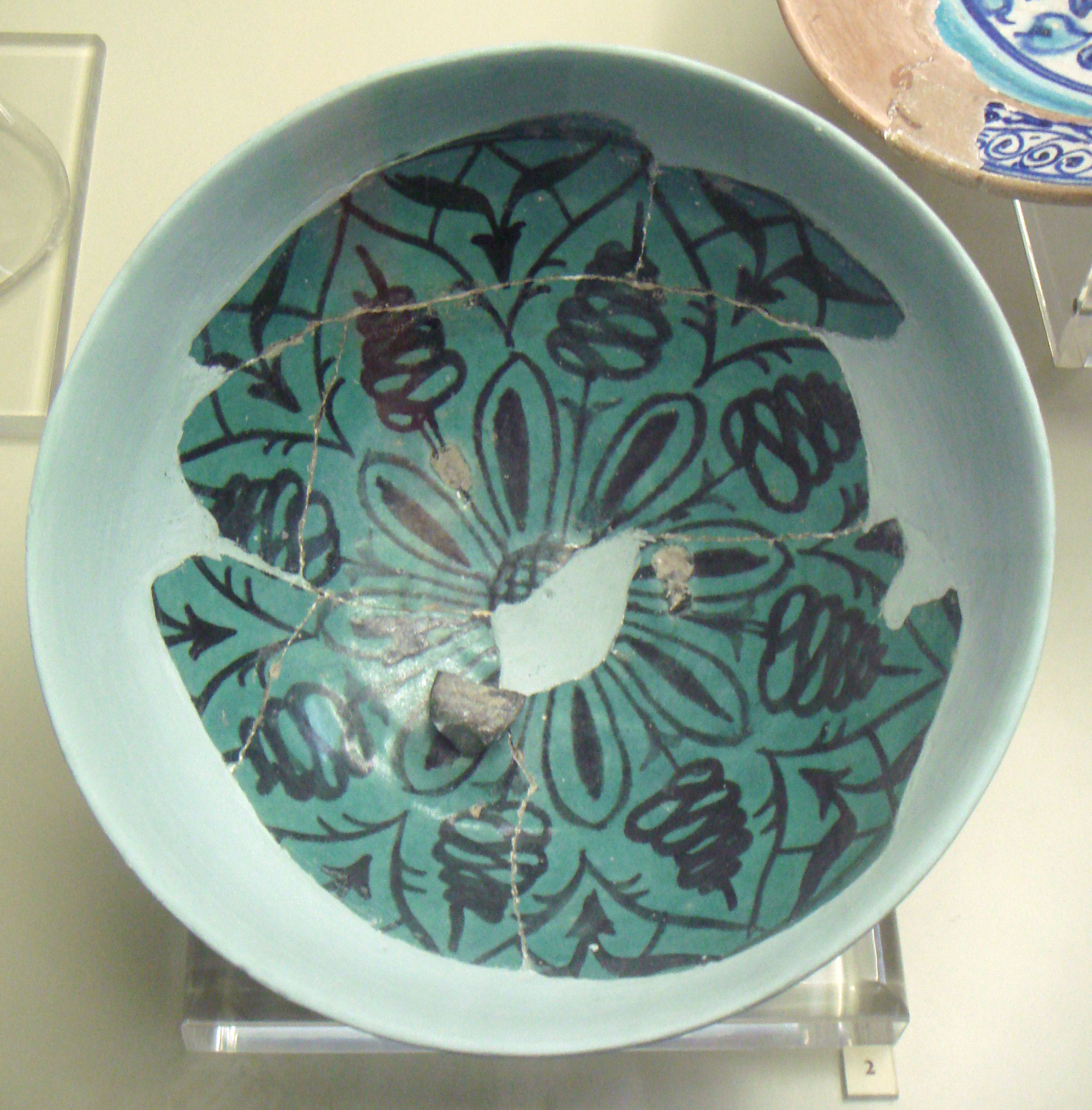
Green Miletus ware. Istanbul Archaeology Museums.

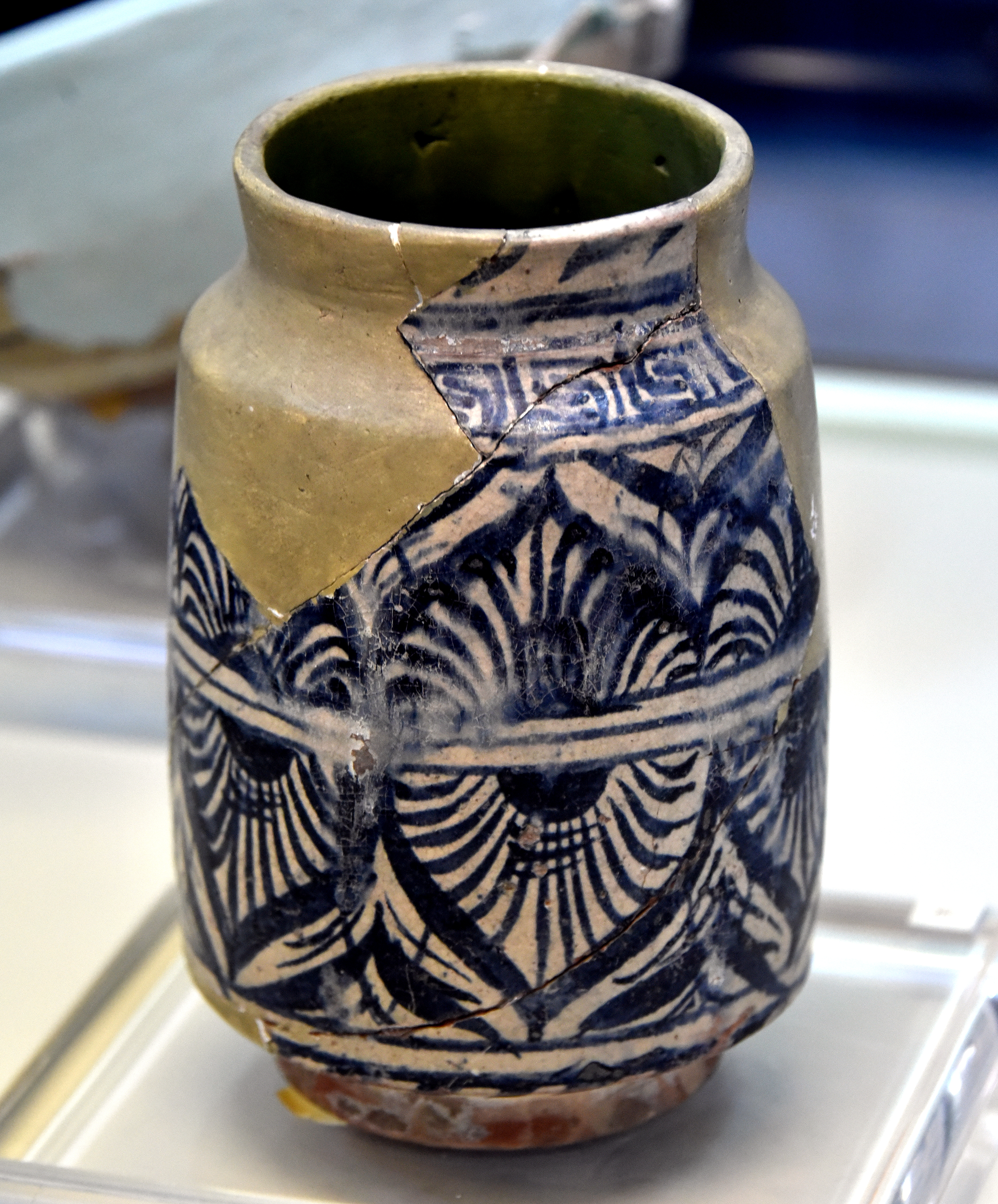
Jar, excavated at Iznik
