= Turkish and Islamic Arts Museum =

Museum in Istanbul, Turkey

- Türk ve İslam Eserleri Müzesi
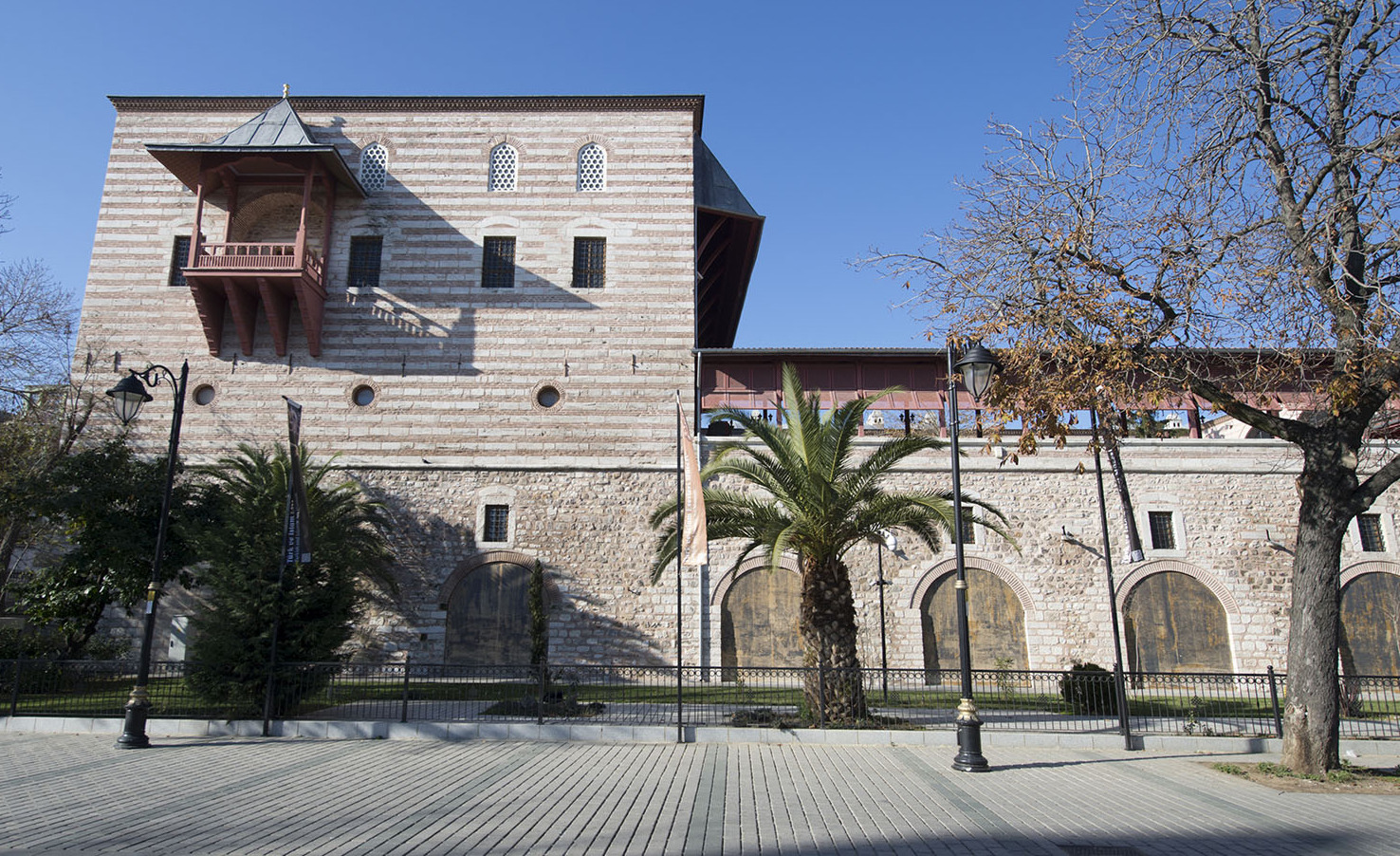
- Former name: Museum of Islamic Endowments
- Established: 1914
- Location: Istanbul, Turkey
- Coordinates: 41°0′22.68″N 28°58′28.42″E
- Type: Museum

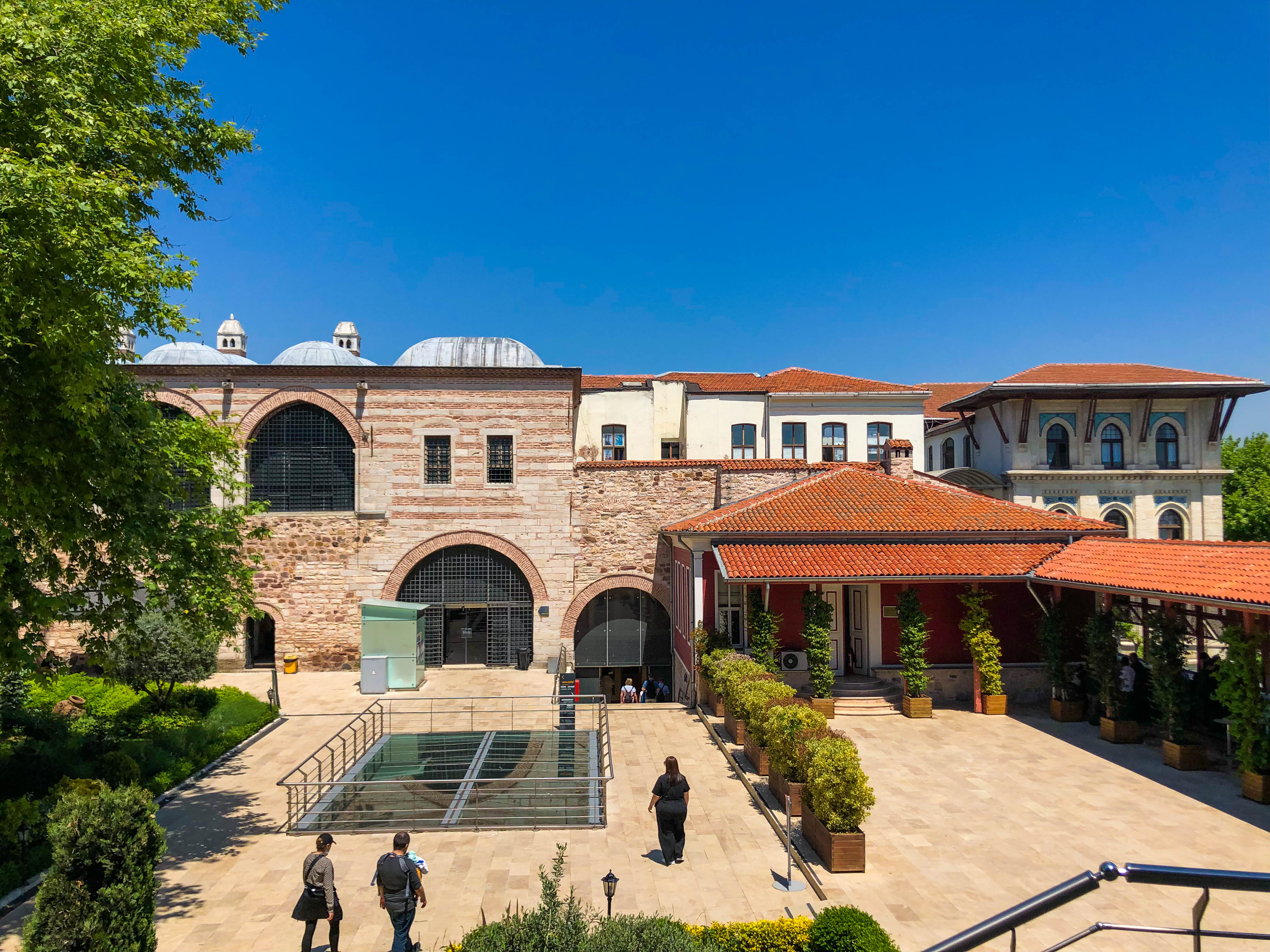
Inner courtyard of Pargalı Ibrahim Pasha palace, where the museum of Turkish and Islamic Arts is located.

The Turkish and Islamic Arts Museum (Turkish: Türk ve İslam Eserleri Müzesi) is a museum in Sultanahmet Square in Fatih district of Istanbul, Turkey which first opened in 1914 and in 1983 moved into the palace of Pargalı Ibrahim Pasha, the second grand vizier of Suleiman the Magnificent. The building was constructed in 1524. The collection includes notable examples of Islamic calligraphy, tiles, and rugs as well as ethnographic displays on various cultures in Turkey, particularly nomad groups. These displays recreate rooms or dwellings from different time periods and regions.

The space utilized for the museum was once a ceremony hall for the original Palace. Many of the sections of the museum contain notable influences from the palaces well kept setting, making it an impressive art sanctuary dedicated to displaying the culture of Islamic art from various periods. The museum houses over 40,000 works of art that range from carpet art, wooden works, and stone art collections. The museum is one of the largest museums in Turkey. The Turkish and Islamic Arts Museum is culturally rich in various areas, including its location, as it sits across from the famous Blue Mosque in Istanbul. The Turkish and Islamic Arts Museum is well respected for its cultivation of art, culture, and history. Over the many years of its existence, the museum has received acknowledgement for being Islamic art hub that narrates the relationship between art history and material culture. The museum was the first to bring together all Islamic arts of Turkey. The museum notably creates and participates in temporary national and international exhibitions since its establishment. In 1984 the museum was awarded Special Jury Award of Museum of the Year Competition of the European Council and a prize given by European Council - Unesco for its studies for making the children love the culture inheritance.

== History ==
In 1914 it originally opened as the Museum of Islamic Endowments housed in the Süleymaniye Complex. Süleymaniye Complex, built by the great Turkish architect Sinan in the 16th century. Eventually, the museum renamed as the Turkish and Islamic Arts Museum after the establishment of the Republic of Turkey in 1923 which shifted society with the status of the nation. Along with the transition of society came its influence in exhibition spaces which shifted from representing the Ottoman Empire and more of the overall Islamic world. As Ottoman museums emerged aligning with Turkish Nationalism Turkish society began adopting Western practices in art. In 1983 the museum moved to the İbrahim Pasha Palace. The well preserved building has architectural influences from the 16th century Ottoman civil architecture. The historic stone building was repaired between 1966- 1983. The Turkish and Islamic Arts Museum was the first museum in Turkey to include Islamic art together The function of the beautiful building has varied from serving as a space for grand viziers, barracks, embassy palace, register office, Janissary band house, sewing workshop and prison.

== Exhibitions ==
In January 2015 the museum closed for renovation and re-opened in April 2015 with new exhibits. The collection's major theme is religious art history from the Ottoman Empire during the 20th century. It also exhibits works of art from the Ottoman Empire includes notable examples of Islamic calligraphy, tiles, and rugs as well as ethnographic displays on various cultures in Turkey, particularly nomad groups. These displays recreate rooms or dwellings from different time periods and regions.

=== Current ===
Today the museum contains some of the finest carpets from the Islamic world as well as over 17,000 manuscripts, 3,000 Qur’ans, and 250,000 early Qur’anic fragments from the Umayyad Mosque in Damascus. Its collection provide an ethnographic approach to the Islamic world. The exhibitions are structured by floor and center around themes; the first floor is dedicated to traditional Turkish life and the second floor is dedicated to Islamic art.

== See also ==
- Hippodrome of Constantinople
- Istanbul Archaeology Museums
- List of Intangible Cultural Heritage elements in Turkey
- Istanbul Modern

== Collection highlights ==
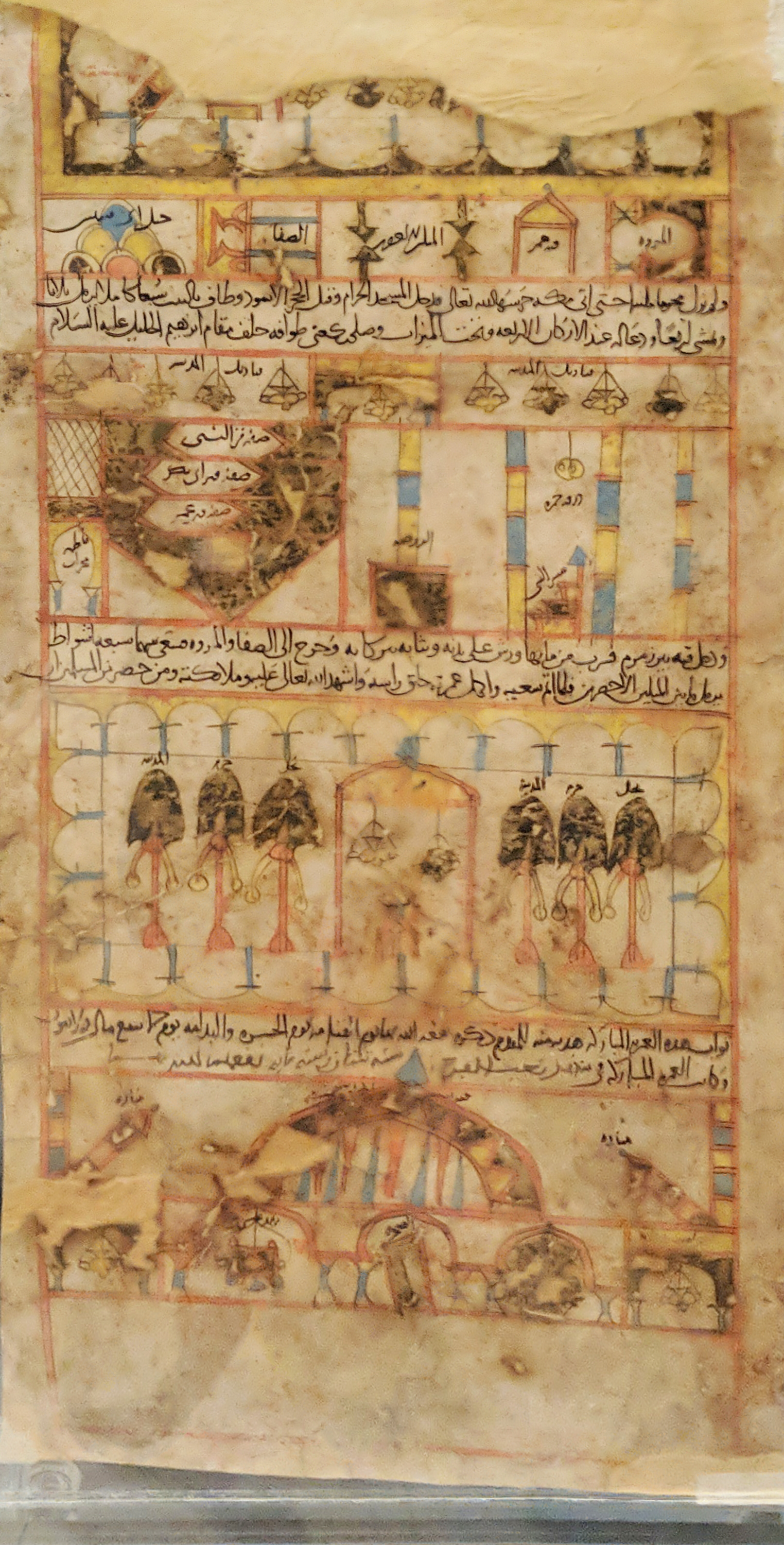
Pilgrimage proxy scroll, dated 1206. Ayyubid dynasty

Doors of the Cizre Mosque (doorknob), beginning of the 13th century. Artuqid dynasty

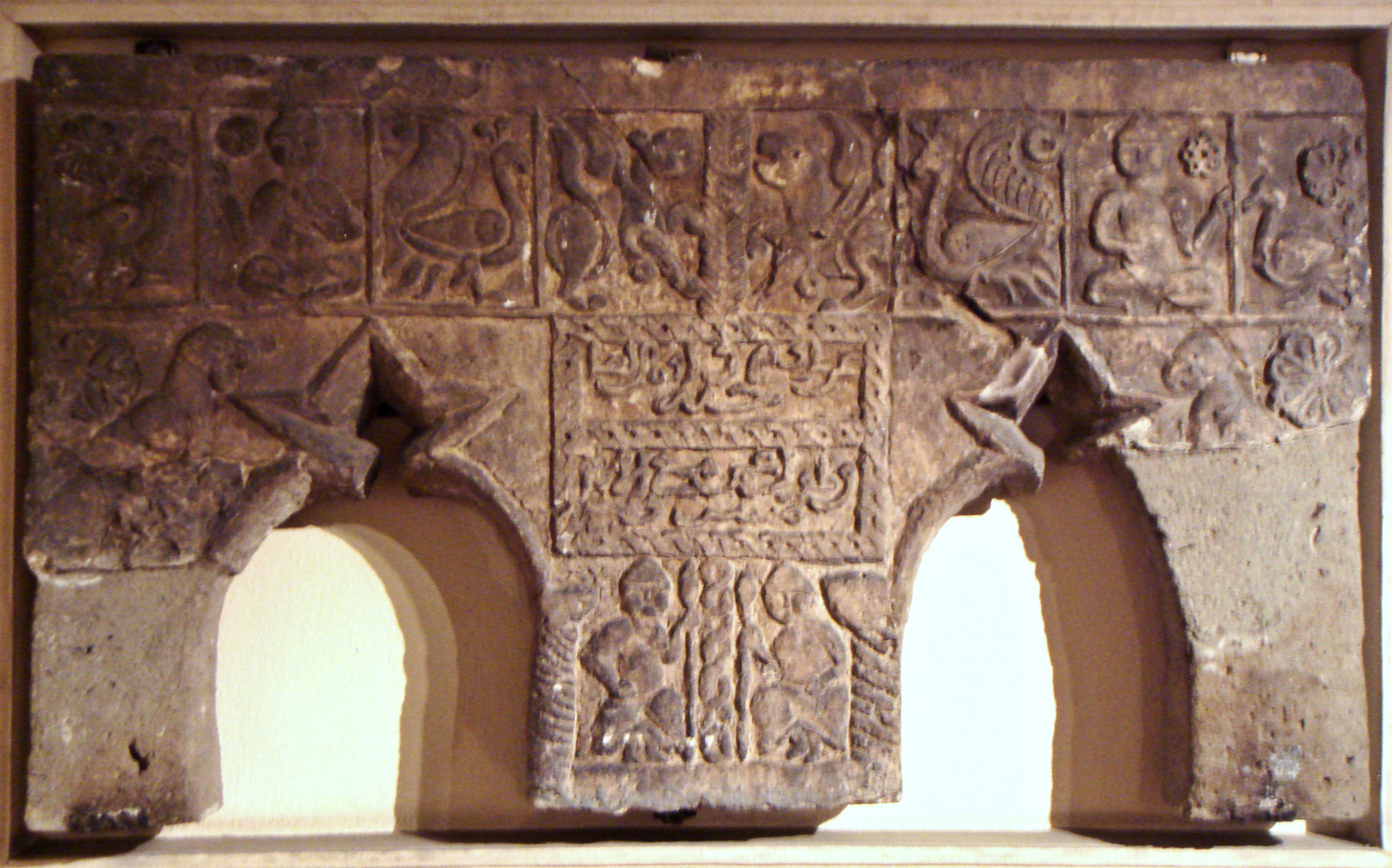
Figurative architectural fragment, 13th century. Artuqid dynasty

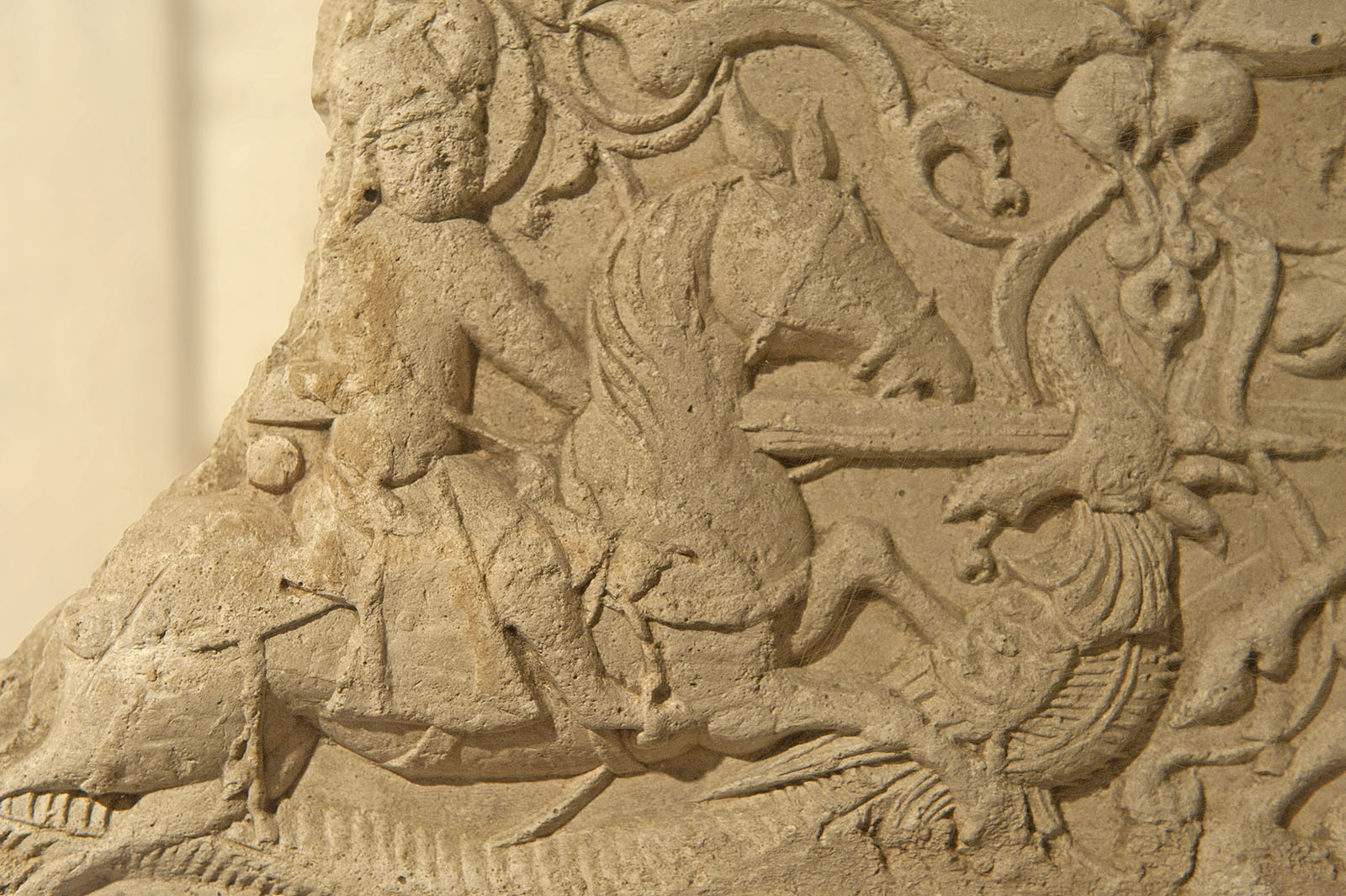
Plaster relief, 13th-14th century. Sultanate of Rum

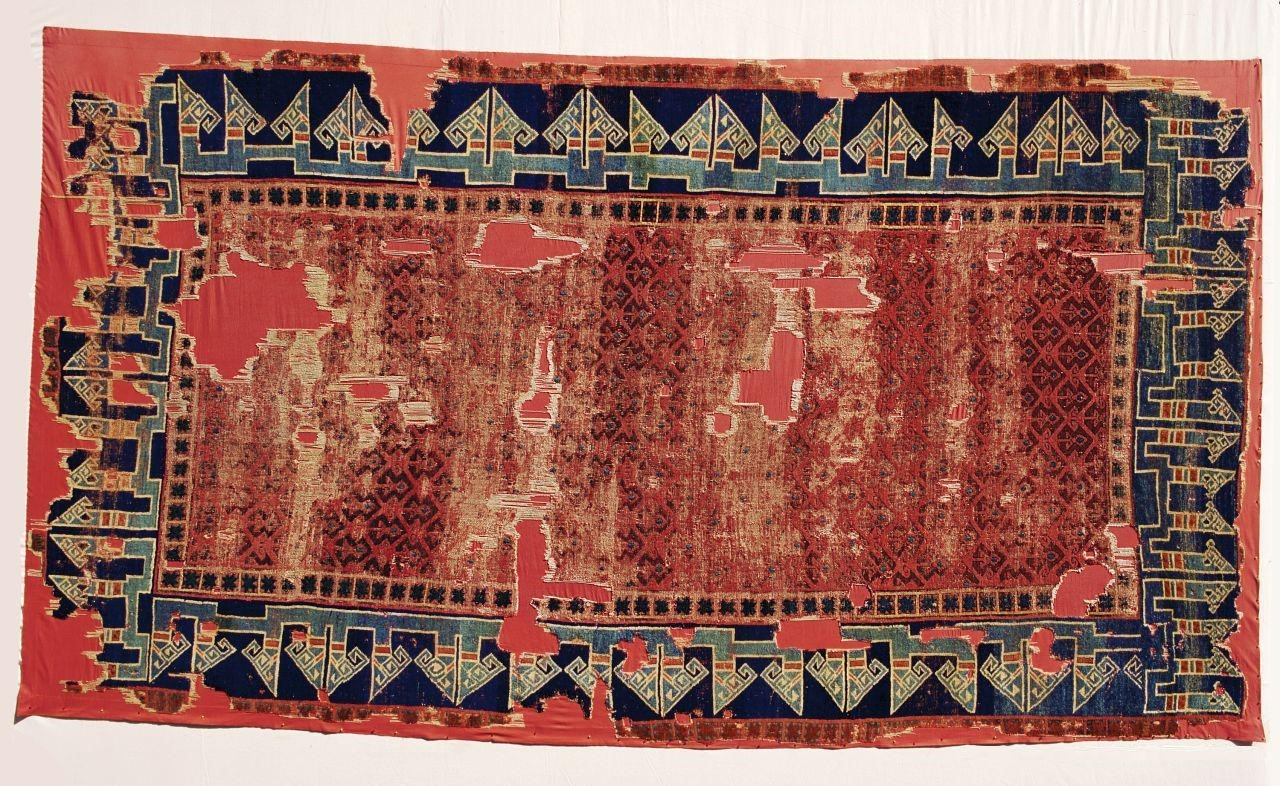
Rug from the Alâeddin Mosque, 13th century

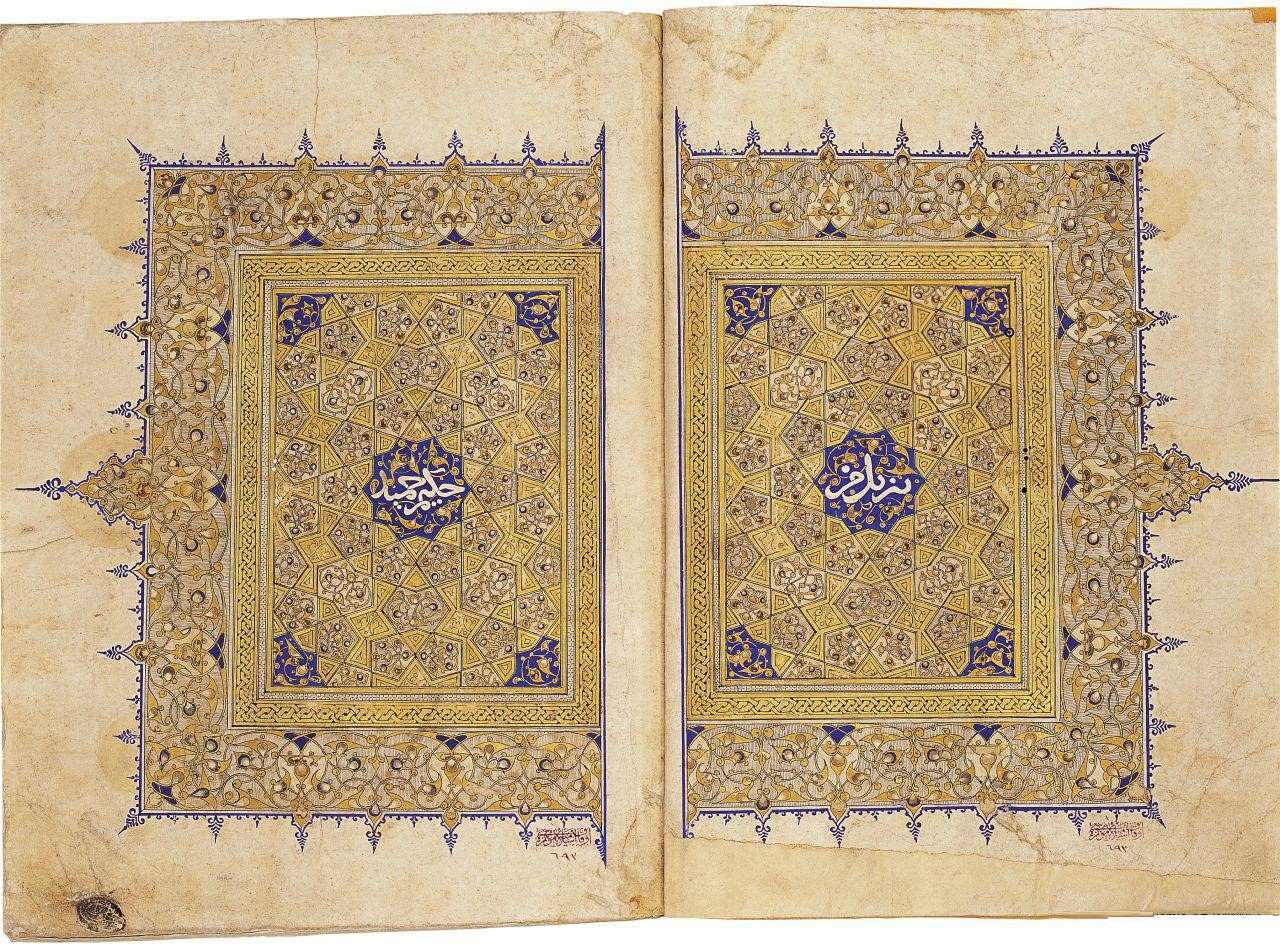
Al-Nasir Muhammad Qur'an. Cairo, 1313–1314

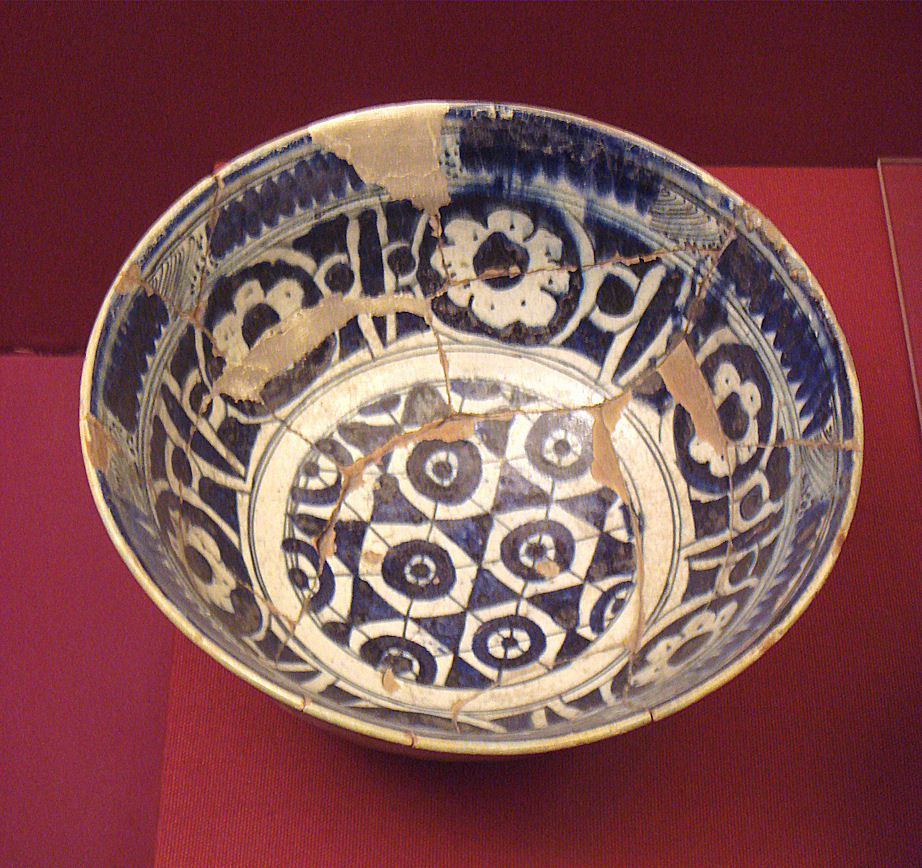
Miletus ware, 15th century

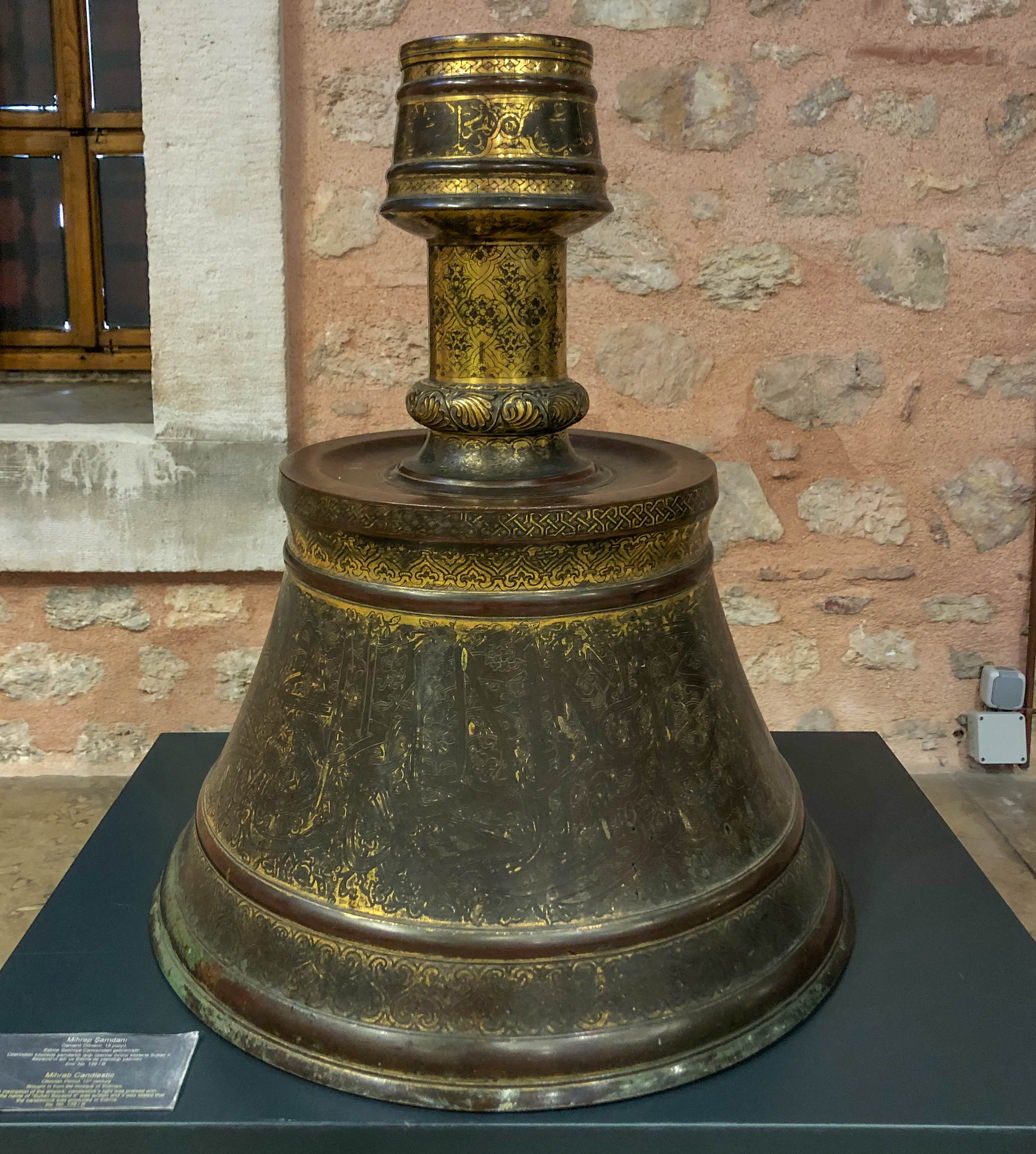
Mihrab candlestick made for sultan Bayezid II, c. 1488

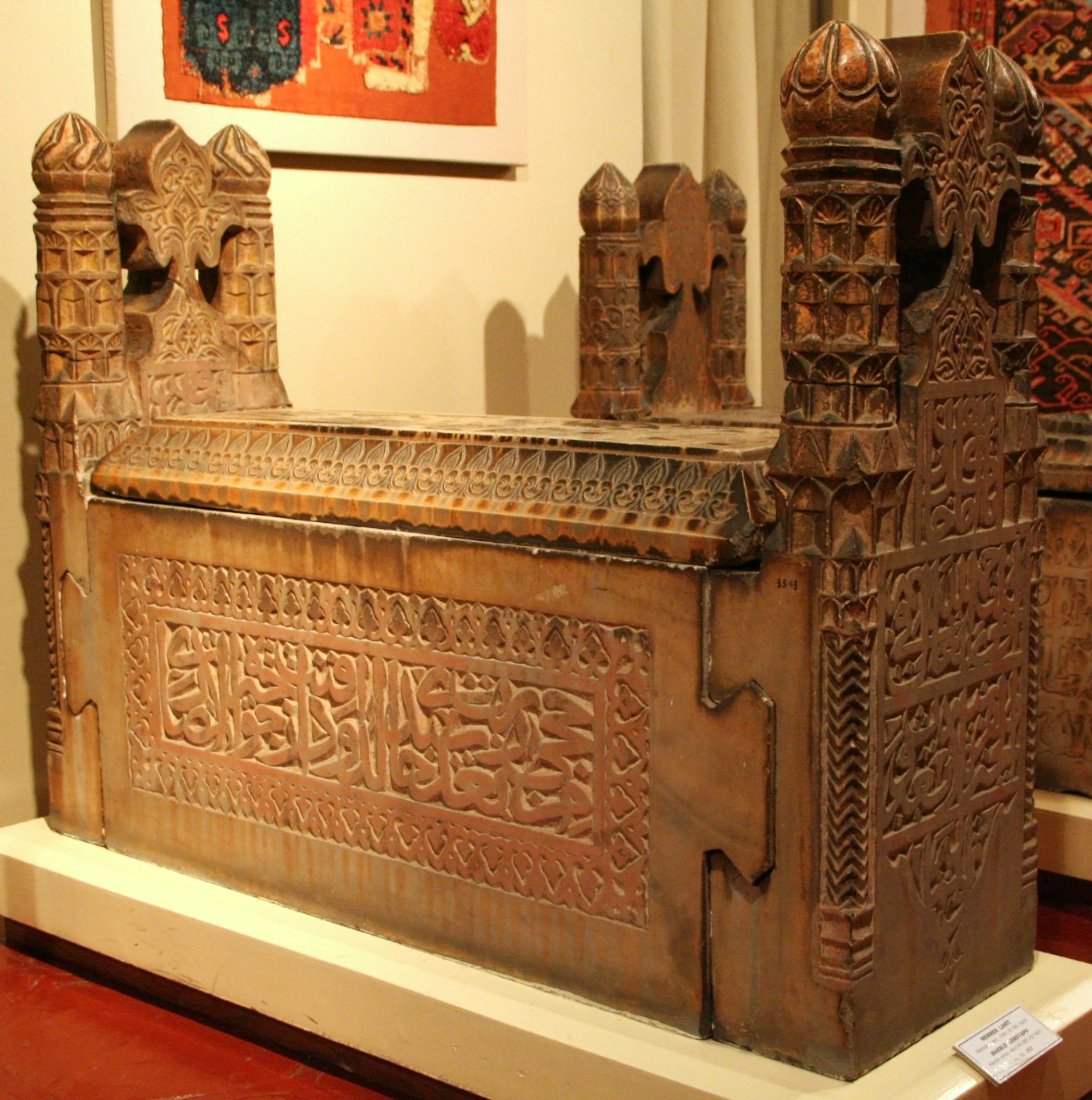
Marble Cenotaph from the tomb of Özdemir Bey (d. 1493), Mamluk governor of Aleppo

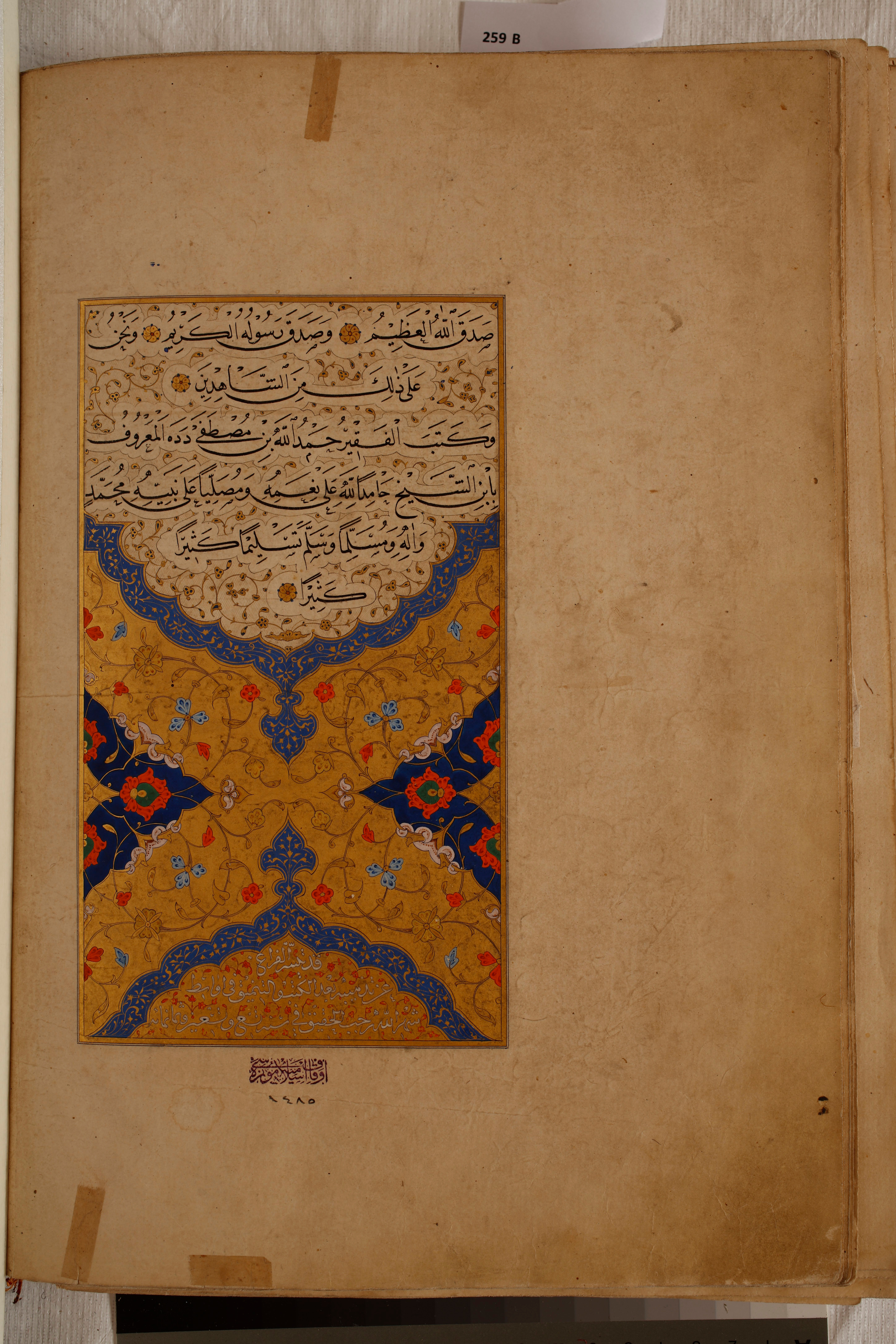
Qur'an manuscript copied by Şeyh Hamdullah, dated April 1494

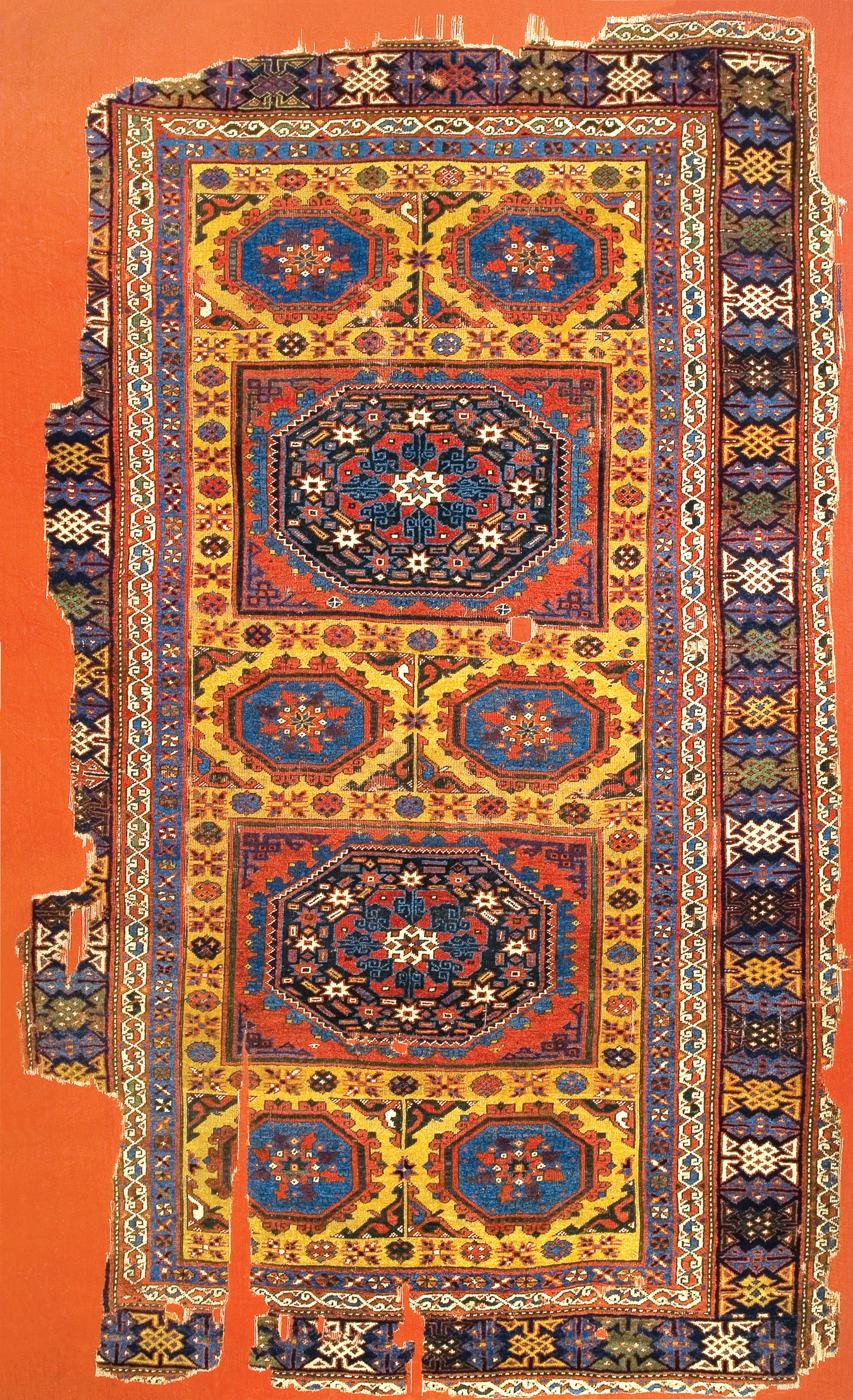
Holbein carpet, Bergama region, 16th century

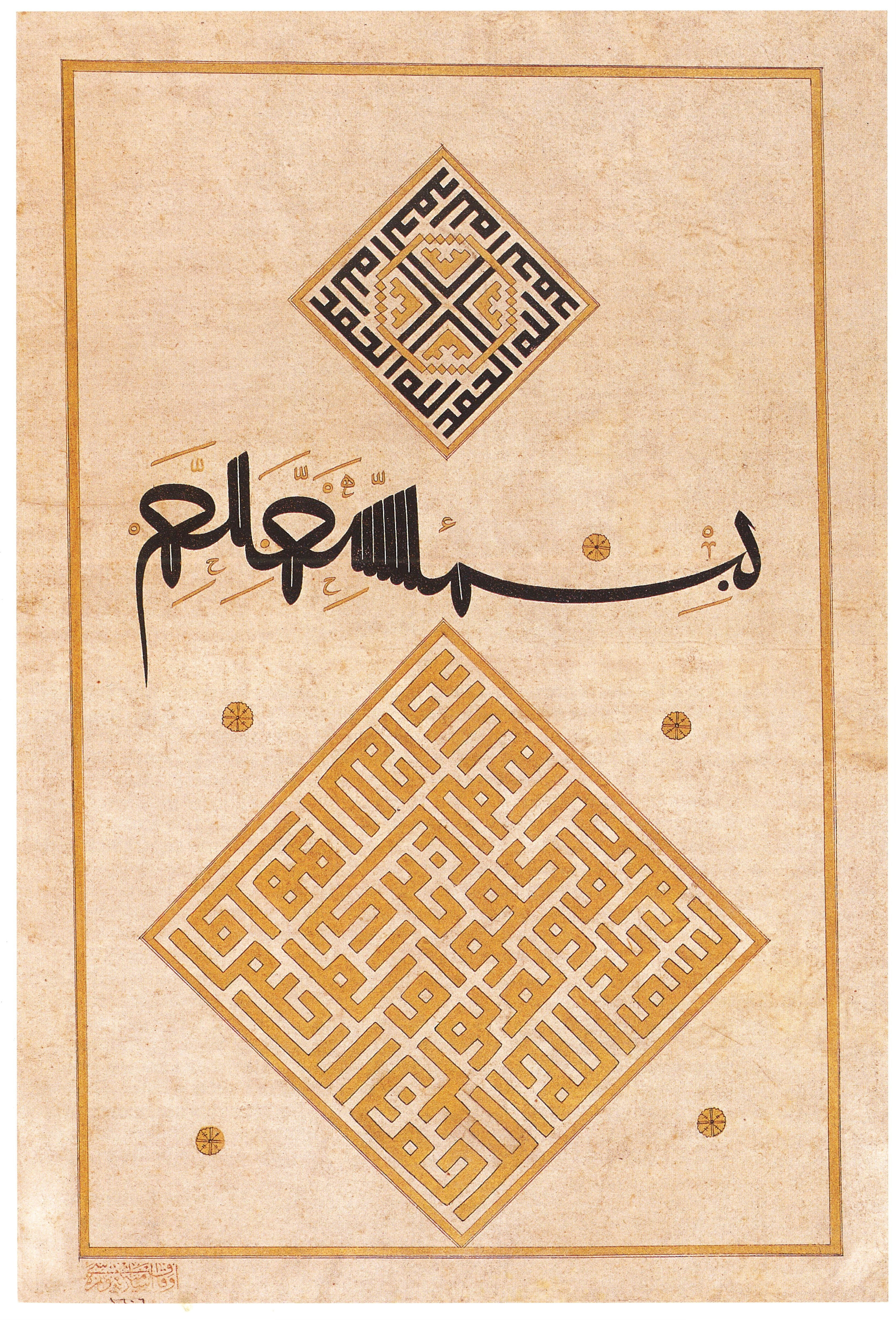
Calligraphic album ('muraqqa') of Ahmed Karahisari. Istanbul, c. 1550

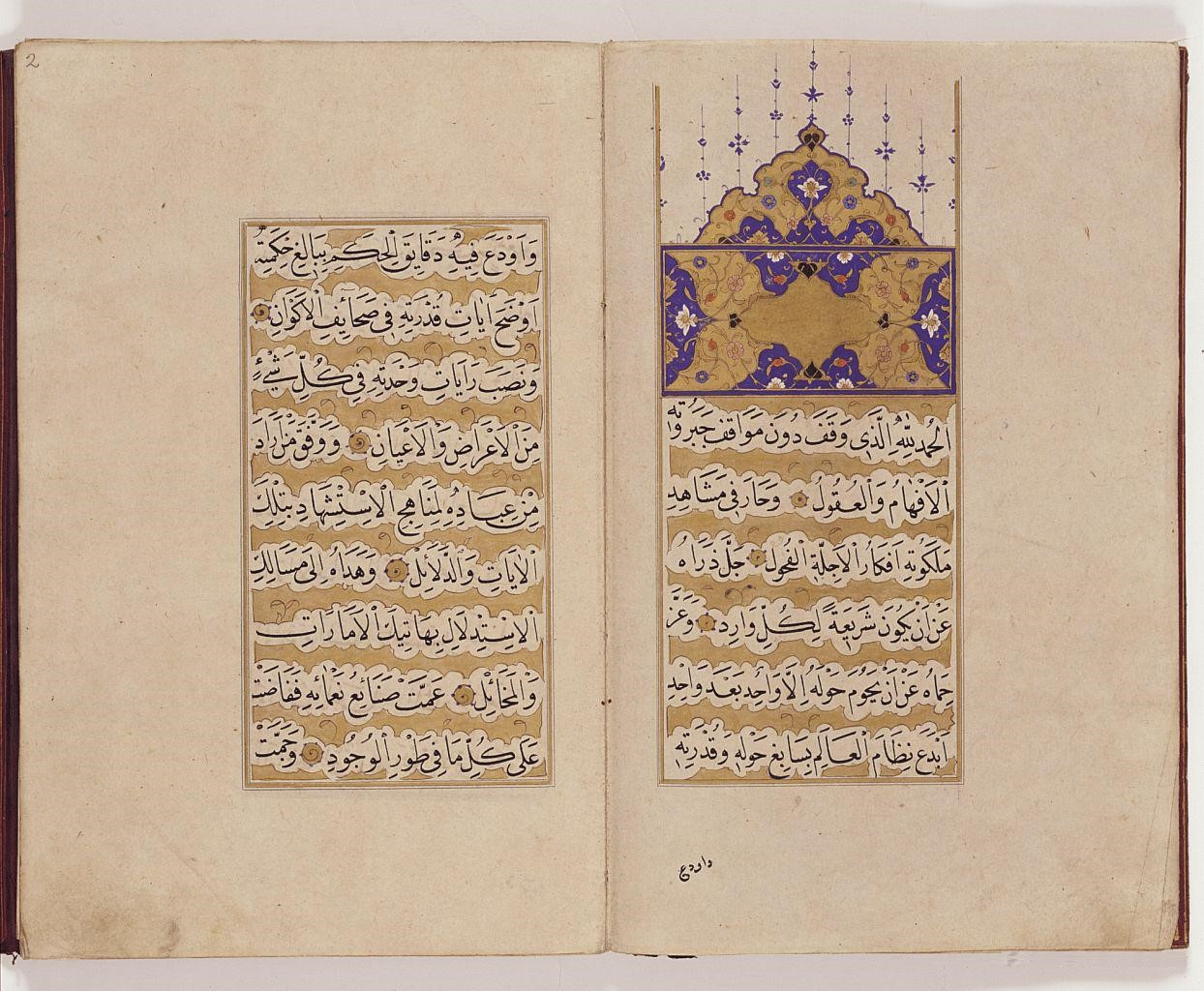
Endowment Charter ('Waqfiyya') of Haseki Hürrem Sultan. Istanbul, 1556–1557

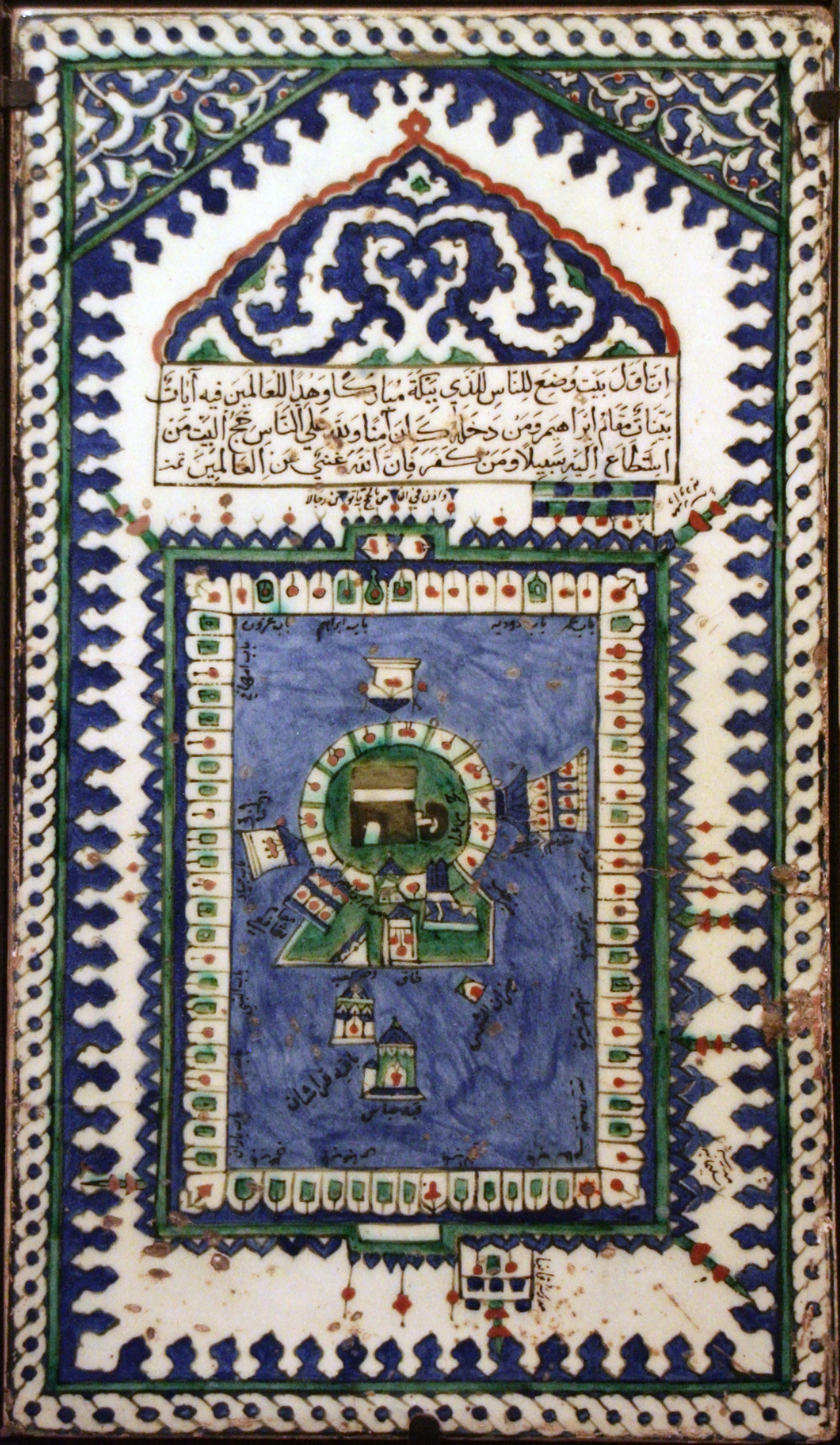
Tile Panel with a Picture of the Kaaba

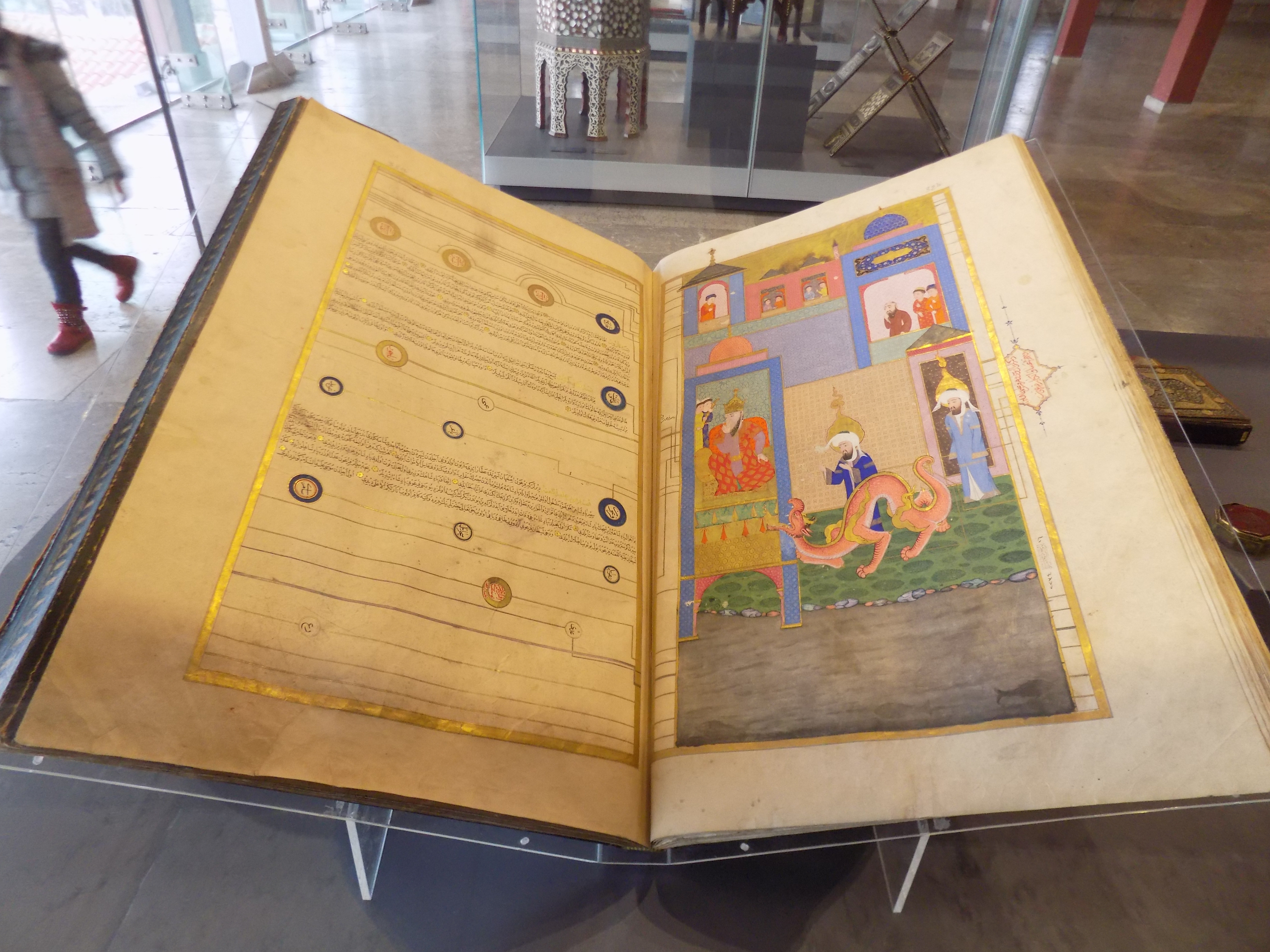
Manuscript of Zubdat al-Tawarikh. Istanbul, 1583

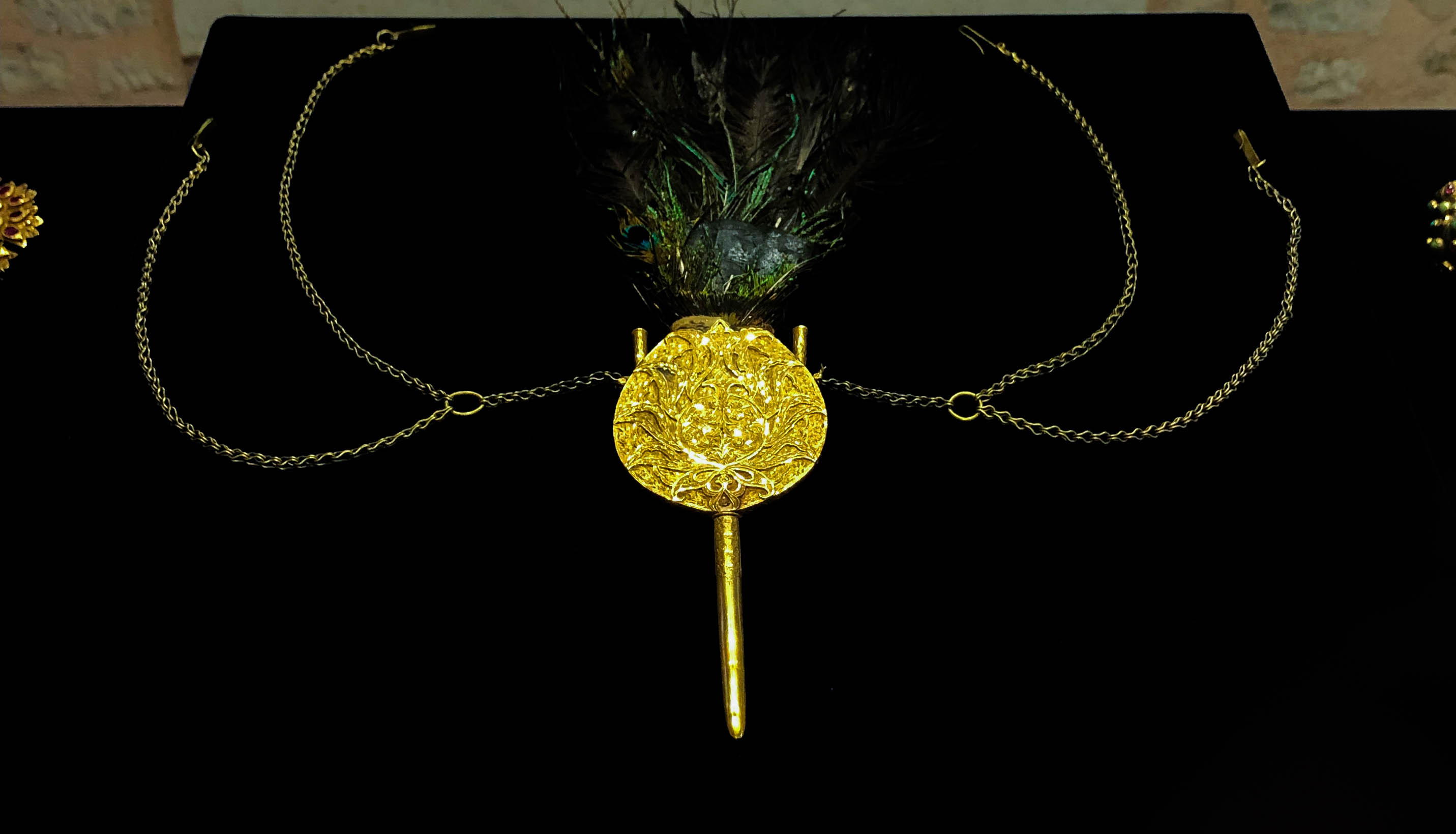
Aigrette holder. Istanbul, 16th century

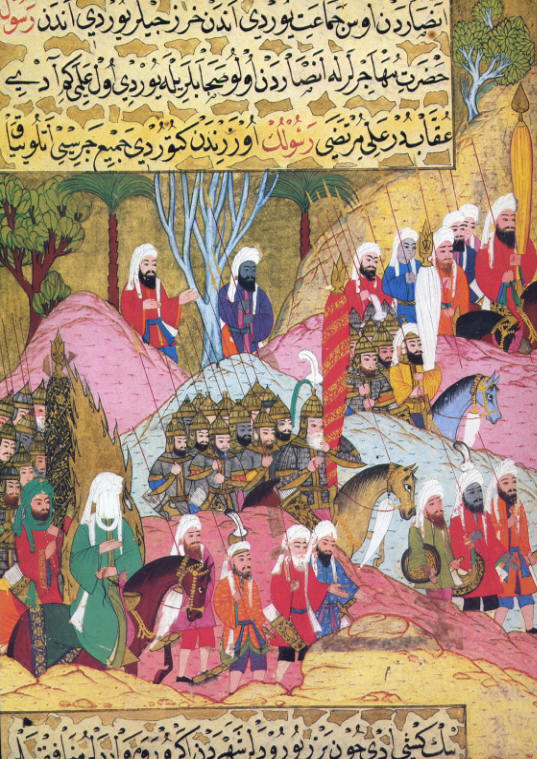
Manuscript of Siyer-i Nebi. Istanbul, 17th century

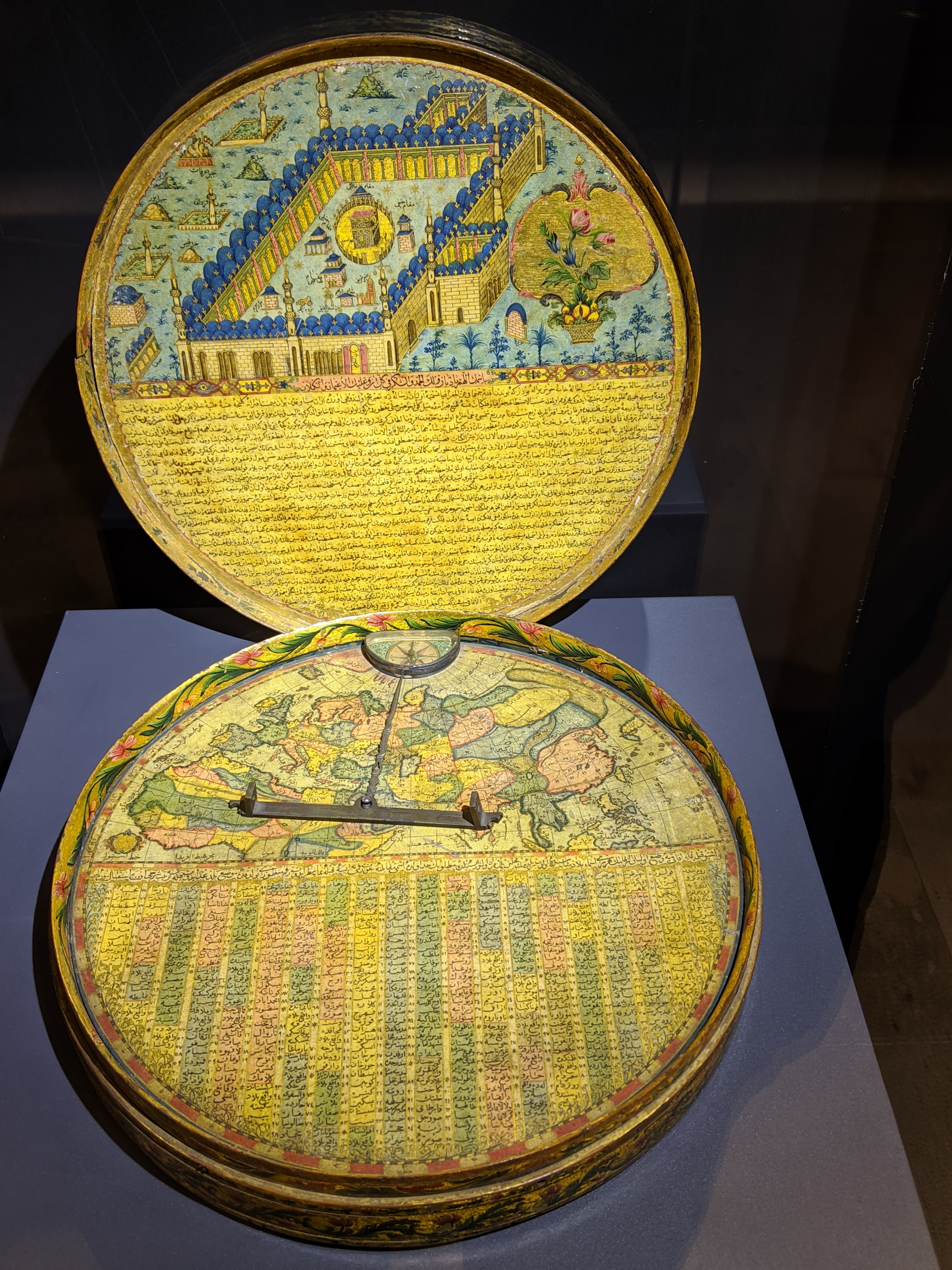
Ottoman qiblanuma, portable astronomical instrument showing the direction to the Ka'ba. Istanbul, 1738

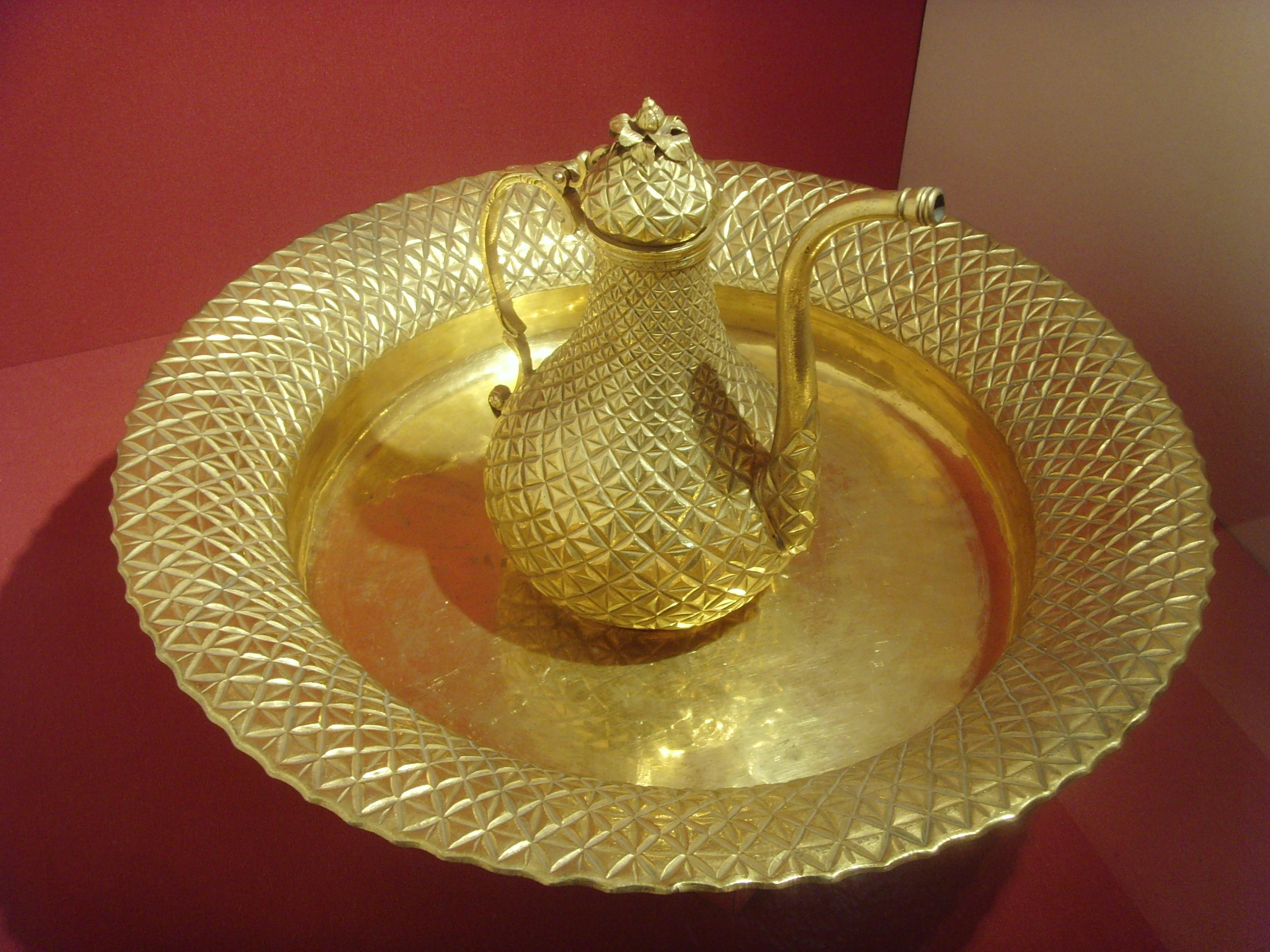
Ewer and basin set. Istanbul, 1870
