= List of North Staffordshire Railway halts =

The North Staffordshire Railway (NSR) had a number of halts and non-public timetable stations. Halts were small, unstaffed stations with few, if any, facilities. Non-public timetable stations were stations that did not feature in the publicly advertised railway timetable and were, for example, for internal railway use only or only served by excursion trains rather than regular services.

Many of the NSR halts opened in the early 20th century when the NSR introduced railmotor services in an attempt to rival the bus and tram services that were developing in Stoke-on-Trent.

Name	Grid reference & co-ordinates	Opened	Closed	Line	Preceding station	Next station	Notes
Cliffe Vale Halt	SJ 870 463; 53°0′53″N 2°11′41″W	1 March 1865	1 August 1865	Stoke–Macclesfield	Etruria	Stoke-on-Trent	Very short lived station introduced with opening of Potteries Loop Line to Hanley. Closed after five months as use did not meet expectations.
Carter's Crossing Halt	SJ 884 446; 52°59′57″N 2°10′26″W	1907	1921	Stoke–Derby	Fenton	Stoke-on-Trent	NSR company use only by workers at Stoke railway works, no actual platform or buildings.
Keele Park	SJ 792 438; 52°59′30″N 2°18′38″W	26 October 1896	5 March 1907	Stoke–Market Drayton	Madeley Road	Keele	Excursion traffic only, mostly for race days at Keele Park racecourse.
Crown Street Halt	SJ 822 466; 53°1′1″N 2°15′57″W	1 June 1905	7 June 1949	Stoke–Market Drayton	Silverdale	Newcastle-under-Lyme	Sometimes referred to as Silverdale (Crown Street). Opened in conjunction with the introduction of the railmotor services between Silverdale and Trentham.
Knutton Halt	SJ 836 466; 53°1′0″N 2°14′42″W	1 June 1905	20 September 1926	Stoke–Market Drayton	Silverdale	Newcastle-under-Lyme	Opened in conjunction with the introduction of the railmotor services between Silverdale and Trentham.
Liverpool Road Halt	SJ 846 467; 53°1′3″N 2°13′50″W	1 June 1905	2 March 1964	Stoke–Market Drayton	Silverdale	Newcastle-under-Lyme	Opened in conjunction with the introduction of the railmotor services between Silverdale and Trentham. (Not to be confused with Kidsgrove Liverpool Road)
Brampton Halt	SJ 849 465; 53°0′57″N 2°15′51″W	1 June 1905	2 April 1923	Stoke–Market Drayton	Silverdale	Newcastle-under-Lyme	Opened in conjunction with the introduction of the railmotor services between Silverdale and Trentham.
Hartshill and Basford Halt	SJ 863 462; 53°0′47″N 2°12′18″W	1 June 1905	20 September 1926	Stoke–Market Drayton	Newcastle-under-Lyme	Stoke-on-Trent	Opened in conjunction with the introduction of the railmotor services between Silverdale and Trentham.
Whieldon Road Halt	SJ 882 445; 52°59′54″N 2°10′34″W	1 June 1905	30 September 1918	Stoke–Stafford	Trentham	Stoke-on-Trent	Opened in conjunction with the introduction of the railmotor services between Silverdale and Trentham. Only served by trains from Stoke.
Mount Pleasant Halt	SJ 881 439; 52°59′34″N 2°10′42″W	1 June 1905	30 September 1918	Stoke–Stafford	Trentham	Stoke-on-Trent	Opened in conjunction with the introduction of the railmotor services between Silverdale and Trentham.
Sideway Halt	SJ 881 433; 52°59′13″N 2°10′43″W	1 June 1905	2 April 1923	Stoke–Stafford	Trentham	Stoke-on-Trent	Opened in conjunction with the introduction of the railmotor services between Silverdale and Trentham.
Market Street Halt	SJ 842 543; 53°5′11″N 2°14′15″W	1 July 1909	25 September 1950	Loop Line	Kidsgrove Liverpool Road	Newchapel and Goldenhill	Also known as Kidsgrove Market Street.
Knypersley Halt	SJ 878 568; 53°6′30″N 2°10′59″W	1 October 1914	11 July 1927	Biddulph Valley Line	Biddulph	Black Bull	
Chell Halt	SJ 880 529; 53°4′25″N 2°10′47″W	3 November 1890	1923	Biddulph Valley Line	Black Bull	Ford Green & Smallthorne	Non-public timetable station; only for the use of workers at the nearby Chatterley Whitfield colliery.
Mossley Halt	SJ 884 616; 53°9′8″N 2°10′28″W	1919	13 July 1925	Biddulph Valley Line	Congleton	Biddulph	
Hanford Road Halt	SJ 873 414; 52°58′11″N 2°11′21″W	28 March 1910	1 May 1913	Trentham Park branch	Trentham Park	Trentham	No goods facilities. Opened in conjunction with the opening of the branch to Trentham Park; closed only three years later due to low usage owing to competition from bus traffic.
