= Bucknall and Northwood railway station =

Disused railway station in Stoke on Trent, Staffordshire, England

Bucknall and Northwood
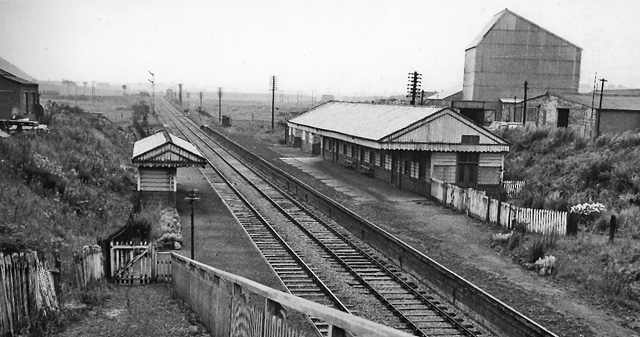
- Bucknall and Northwood station immediately after closure in 1962

General information
- Location: Bucknall and Northwood, Stoke-on-Trent; England
- Coordinates: 53.023°N 2.155°W
- Grid reference: SJ896472
- Platforms: 2

Other information
- Status: Disused

History
- Original company: North Staffordshire Railway
- Post-grouping: London, Midland and Scottish Railway; London Midland Region of British Railways

Key dates
- 1 June 1864: Opened
- 7 May 1956: Closed to regular passenger services
- 4 June 1962: complete closure
Location

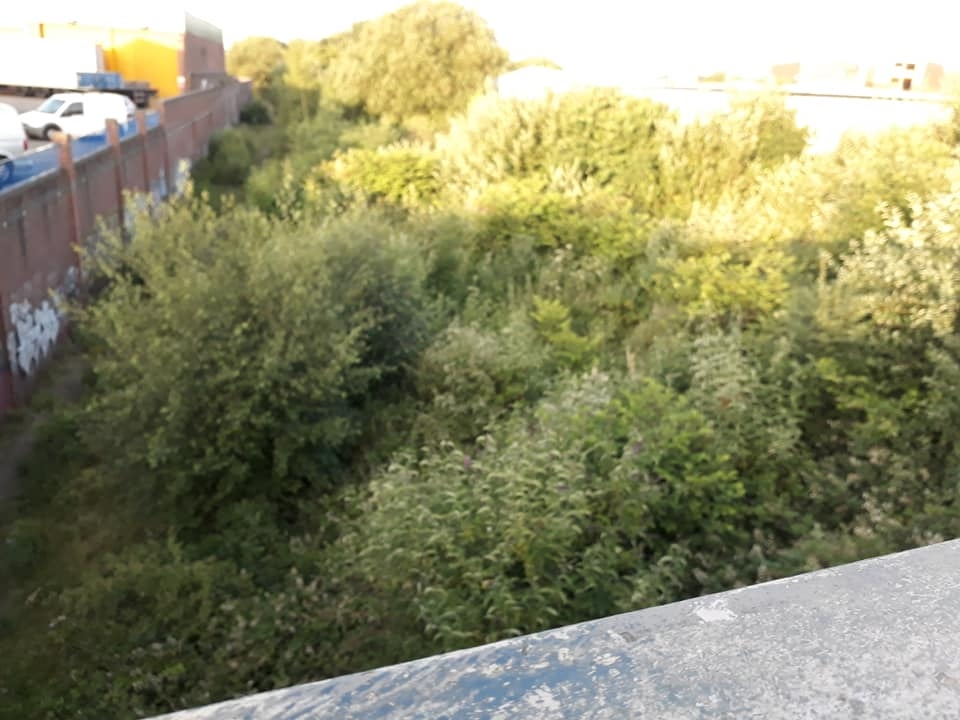
Bucknall and Northwood station site (overgrown) in 2018

Bucknall and Northwood railway station was opened by the North Staffordshire Railway in 1864 to serve the Bucknall area of Stoke-on-Trent. Situated on the company's Biddulph Valley line, the station was served by passenger trains between Stoke and Congleton on the Biddulph Valley line and by trains between Stoke and Leek on the Stoke-Leek line. Passenger services on the Biddulph line ceased in 1927, but services on the Leek line continued until May 1956. After this date the station was still used for special and excursion trains until complete closure in 1962.

The line to Leek remained in use (as far as Leekbrook) until 1988 and the track remains in place and it is planned for the line to reopen under plans put forward by Moorland & City Railways.

Preceding station	Disused railways	Following station
Ford Green & Smallthorne; Line and station closed	North Staffordshire Railway; Biddulph Valley line	Fenton Manor; Line disused, station closed
Milton; Line disused, station closed	North Staffordshire Railway; Stoke–Leek line	Fenton Manor; Line disused, station closed
