= Milton railway station (Staffordshire) =

Former railway station in Stoke on Trent, Staffordshire, England

Milton
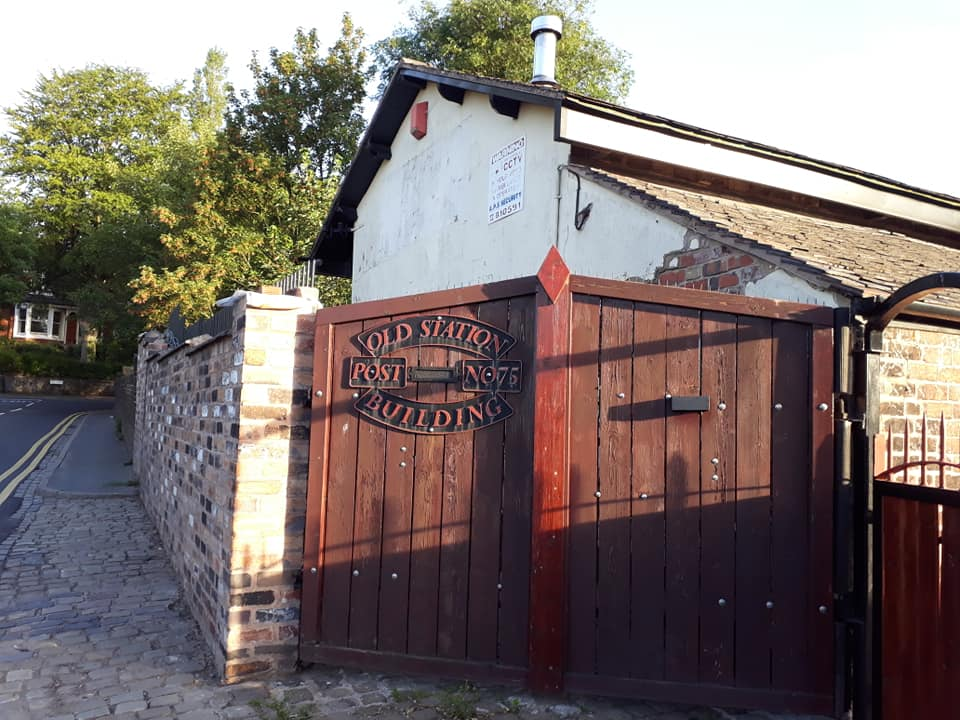
- The former station building in Milton in 2018

General information
- Location: Stoke on Trent; England
- Coordinates: 53.0504°N 2.1511°W
- Grid reference: SJ899504
- Platforms: 1

Other information
- Status: Disused

History
- Original company: North Staffordshire Railway
- Post-grouping: London, Midland & Scottish Railway

Key dates
- 1 November 1867: Opened
- 7 May 1956: Closed
Location

Milton railway station is a disused railway station that served the Milton area of Stoke on Trent in Staffordshire, England.

== History ==
The Stoke–Leek line was opened by the North Staffordshire Railway (NSR) in 1867. Milton and Endon were the original stations on the line that opened at the same time as the line. Situated on the single track section of the line between Milton Junction (where the line diverged from the Biddulph Valley line) and Endon, the station had only a single platform.

== Closure ==
Passenger services over the line were withdrawn in 1956 and the station closed. The line through the station continued in use until 1988 for freight services and since 1988 the line has officially been out of use but not closed.

== Present day ==
Today, the station building survives as a private residence.

Preceding station	Disused railways	Following station
Bucknall and Northwood; Line disused, station closed	North Staffordshire Railway; Stoke–Leek line	Stockton Brook; Line disused, station closed
