= Stockton Brook railway station =

Former railway station in Staffordshire, England

Stockton Brook
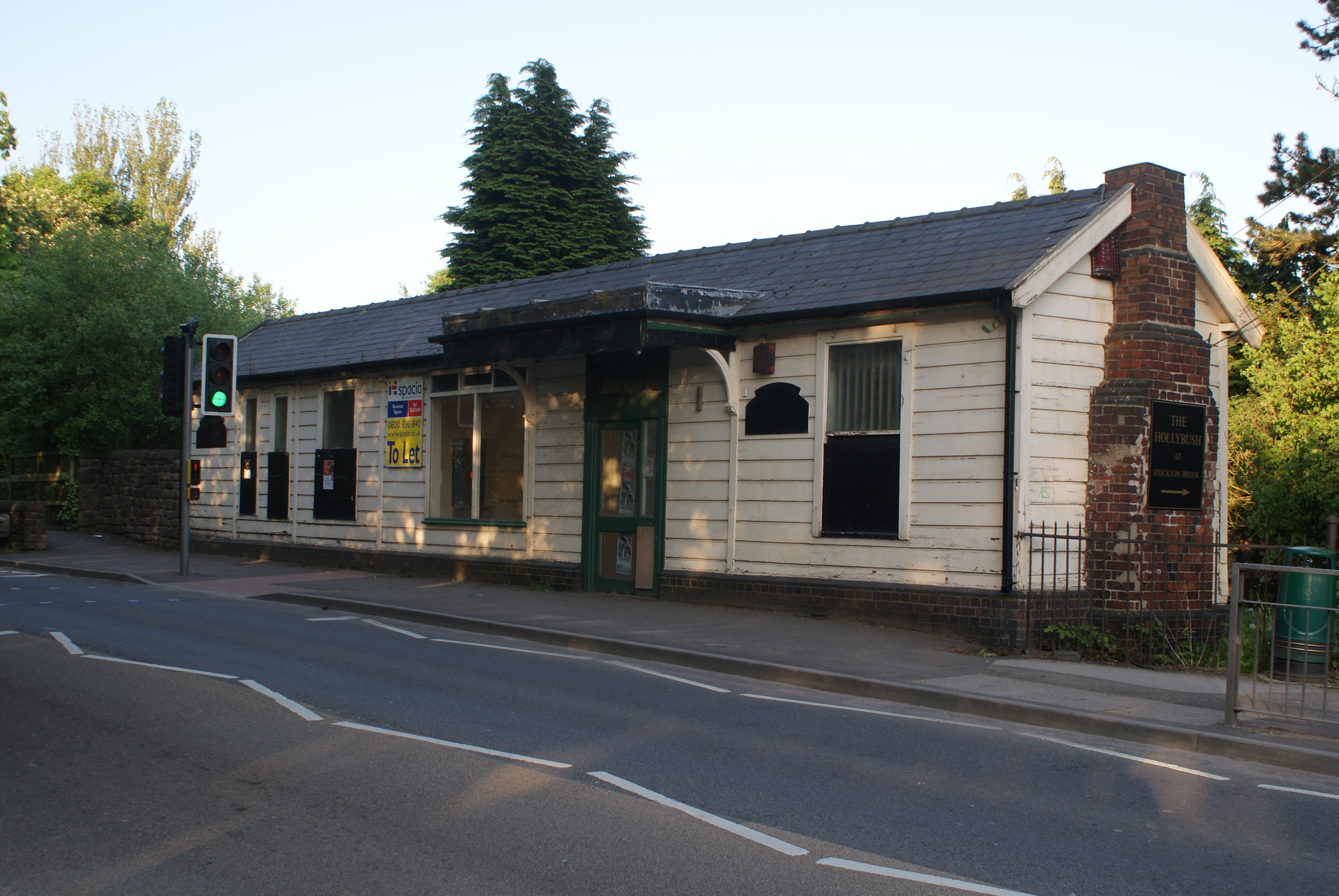
- Station in 2009

General information
- Location: Stockton Brook, Stoke on Trent and Brown Edge, Staffordshire Moorlands; England
- Coordinates: 53.0656°N 2.1228°W
- Grid reference: SJ918520
- Platforms: 1

Other information
- Status: Small business

History
- Original company: North Staffordshire Railway
- Post-grouping: London, Midland and Scottish Railway

Key dates
- 1 July 1896: Opened
- 7 May 1956: Closed
Location

Stockton Brook railway station is a disused railway station that served the villages of Stockton Brook in the city of Stoke on Trent and Brown Edge in the Staffordshire Moorlands district in Staffordshire, England.

== History ==
The Stoke–Leek line was opened by the North Staffordshire Railway (NSR) in 1867 but it was not until 1896 that a station to serve the village of Stockton Brook was built. Situated on the single-track section of the line between Milton Junction (where the line diverged from the Biddulph Valley line) and Endon, the station had only a single platform situated in a shallow cutting. The station buildings were at street level. During the LMS period the station was known as Stockton Brook for Brown Edge.

== Closure ==
Passenger services over the line were withdrawn in 1956 and the station closed. The station buildings remain in existence and are now a shop. The line through the station continued in use until 1988 for freight services and since then the line has officially been out of use but not closed.

== Present day ==
Today, the station building has been repurposed as the "Station Kitchen" which sells kitchen tops and units.

== Route ==
Preceding station	Disused railways	Following station
Milton; Line disused, station closed	North Staffordshire Railway; Stoke–Leek line	Endon; Line disused, station closed

== Stationmasters ==
Below is a list of stationmasters for Stockton Brook Railway Station.

- Mr Hudson (1918)
