= Meir railway station =

Former railway station in Staffordshire, England

Meir

General information
- Location: Meir, Staffordshire, Stoke-on-Trent; England
- Coordinates: 52.9770°N 2.0985°W
- Grid reference: SJ935421
- Platforms: 2

Other information
- Status: Disused

History
- Original company: North Staffordshire Railway
- Post-grouping: London, Midland and Scottish Railway; London Midland Region of British Railways

Key dates
- 12 May 1894: Opened
- 7 November 1966: Closed
Location

Meir railway station served the Meir area of Stoke-on-Trent, England. It was opened in 1894 by the North Staffordshire Railway on its line to Derby and was situated in a cutting to the east of Meir tunnel.

The station closed in 1966 with hardly any evidence of its existence left today apart from the footprint of the buildings which are covered in vegetation.

The building was of timber construction which had a booking office with cast iron coal burning stove, a waiting room that had benched seating, a small store room for cleaning and bike storage, and a bucket type toilet that was normally emptied by the junior porter in a dug out hole in the small wooded area to the rear of the building.

There was a wooden shelter in the middle of the downside platform, and on the eastern end stood the coal shed made of sleepers complete with chute from the bridge for road vehicle delivery.

Preceding station	Historical railways	Following station
Normacot Line open, station closed	North Staffordshire Railway Crewe to Derby Line	Blythe Bridge Line and station open

== Re-opening proposal ==
On 23 May 2020, it was announced by the UK Department for Transport that they would fund a feasibility study into re-opening Meir railway station as part of their Restoring Your Railway policy. The re-opening would depend on a suitable business case being proposed and accepted.

On 4 October 2023, the government committed to reopening the station as part of its Network North scheme. Funding for the scheme was withdrawn in July 2024.

== Tunnel ==
Meir railway tunnel is located between Longton in the west and Meir station in the east. The east tunnel portal is located at the end of Meir station and runs for 744 metres (814 yd). The tunnel was constructed by the North Staffordshire Railway and was opened in 1848 when the line was opened between Stoke and Uttoxeter on 7 August of that year.
