= Stoke-on-Trent railway station =

Railway station in Staffordshire, England

Stoke-on-Trent
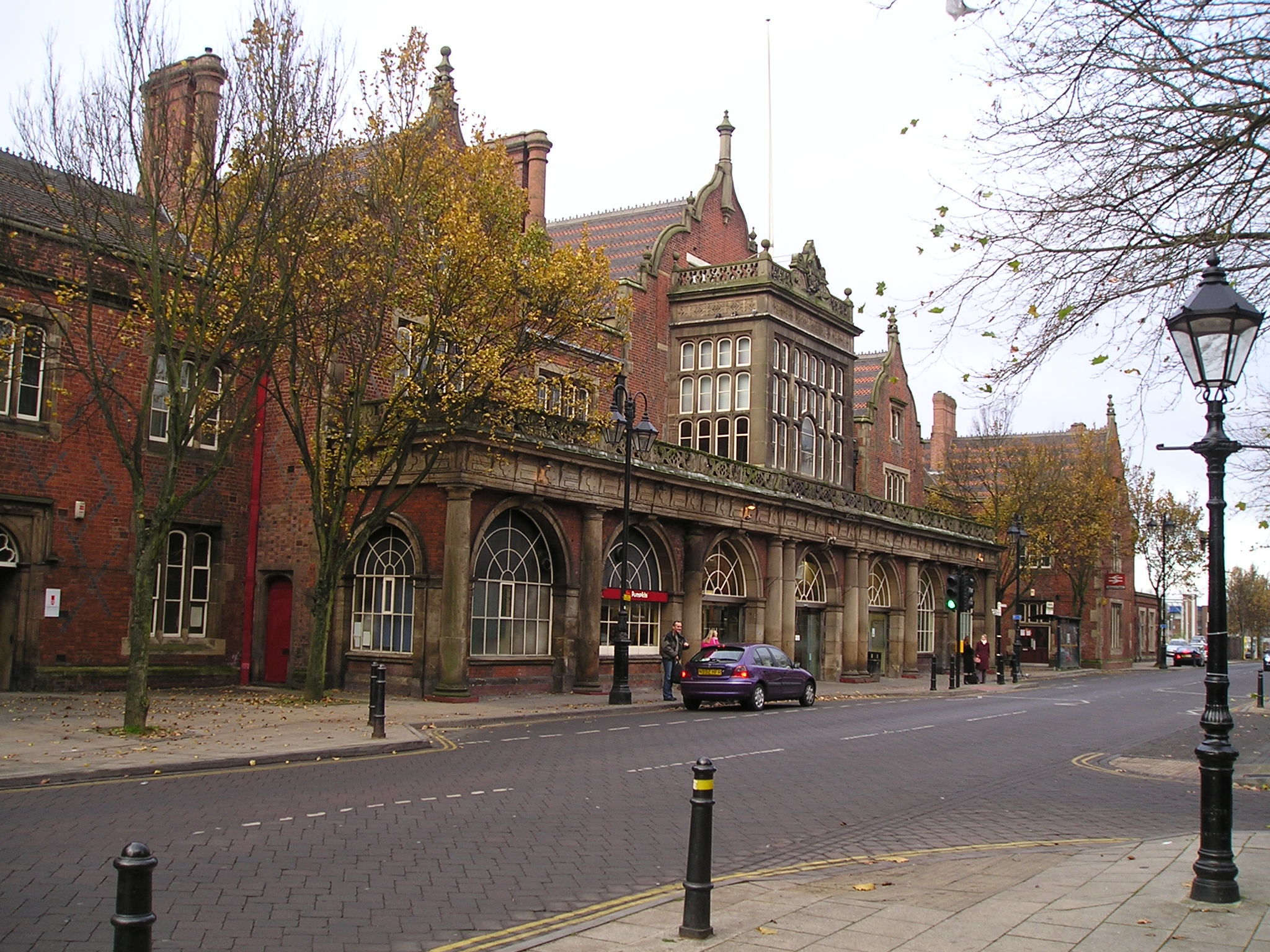

General information
- Location: Stoke-upon-Trent, City of Stoke-on-Trent, England
- Coordinates: 53.0081°N 2.181°W
- Grid reference: SJ879456
- Manager: Avanti West Coast
- Platforms: 3

Other information
- Station code: SOT
- Classification: DfT category C1

History
- Opened: 9 October 1848

Passengers
- 2021/22: ▲2.302 million
- Interchange: ▲0.100 million
- 2022/23: ▲2.505 million
- Interchange: ▲0.127 million
- 2023/24: ▲2.943 million
- Interchange: ▲0.152 million
- 2024/25: ▲3.016 million
- Interchange: ▲0.177 million
- 2024/25: ▲3.164 million
- Interchange: ▼0.162 million
Location
Notes
- Passenger statistics from the Office of Rail and Road

Stoke-on-Trent railway station serves the city of Stoke-on-Trent, in Staffordshire, England. It lies on the Stafford to Manchester branch of the West Coast Main Line. It also provides an interchange between local services running through Staffordshire, Cheshire and Derbyshire.

== History ==
The Victorian station buildings were opened on 9 October 1848; the other buildings located in Winton Square, including the North Stafford Hotel, were opened in June 1849. All these buildings were constructed by John Jay to the design of H.A. Hunt of London, using an architectural style referred to as "robust Jacobean manor-house". The station was built by the North Staffordshire Railway Company (NSR) and, until the amalgamation of 1923, housed the company's boardroom and its principal offices.

Stoke-on-Trent is the hub of North Staffordshire's passenger train services. The station also used to have links to Leek, on the Biddulph Valley line via Fenton Manor and Endon; Cheadle; Market Drayton, via Newcastle-under-Lyme and Silverdale; and was the southern terminus of the Potteries Loop Line to Mow Cop and Scholar Green, via Hanley, Burslem, Tunstall and Kidsgrove. All of these routes closed to passenger traffic in the 1950s and 1960s, though the line to Leek remained in use for sand and stone traffic to Caldon Low and Oakamoor quarries until the mid-1980s.

On 14 September 2015, the station began its new development project. Platform 1 saw the introduction of automatic ticket barriers in December 2015, along with new fast ticket machines. The historic entrance onto platform 2 following reconstruction work was reopened in February 2016, with new automatic ticket barriers and ticket machines. Alongside this, platform 2 gained a new retail space and the waiting room was also refurbished, opening in January 2016.

== Design ==
The station is situated in Winton Square, which is described as Britain's only piece of major town planning undertaken by a railway company specifically to offset a station building. It is a Grade II* listed building, one of four listed buildings in the square; the North Stafford Hotel, directly opposite the station, is also Grade II* listed, while a statue of Josiah Wedgwood and a row of railway cottages either side of the square are Grade II listed.

The building is constructed of dark red brick, with black diapering and stone dressings. It has three Dutch-style gables; the central gable has a prominent first-floor bay window, which is decoratively mullioned, above which is a parapet bearing the NSR's coat of arms. Behind the bay window is the boardroom of the NSR, while the remainder of the upper floor was designed as office space. Either side of the bay window is a terrace, which runs across the top of an arcade of Tuscan columns flanking seven arches, each of which contains a fanlight.

== Layout ==
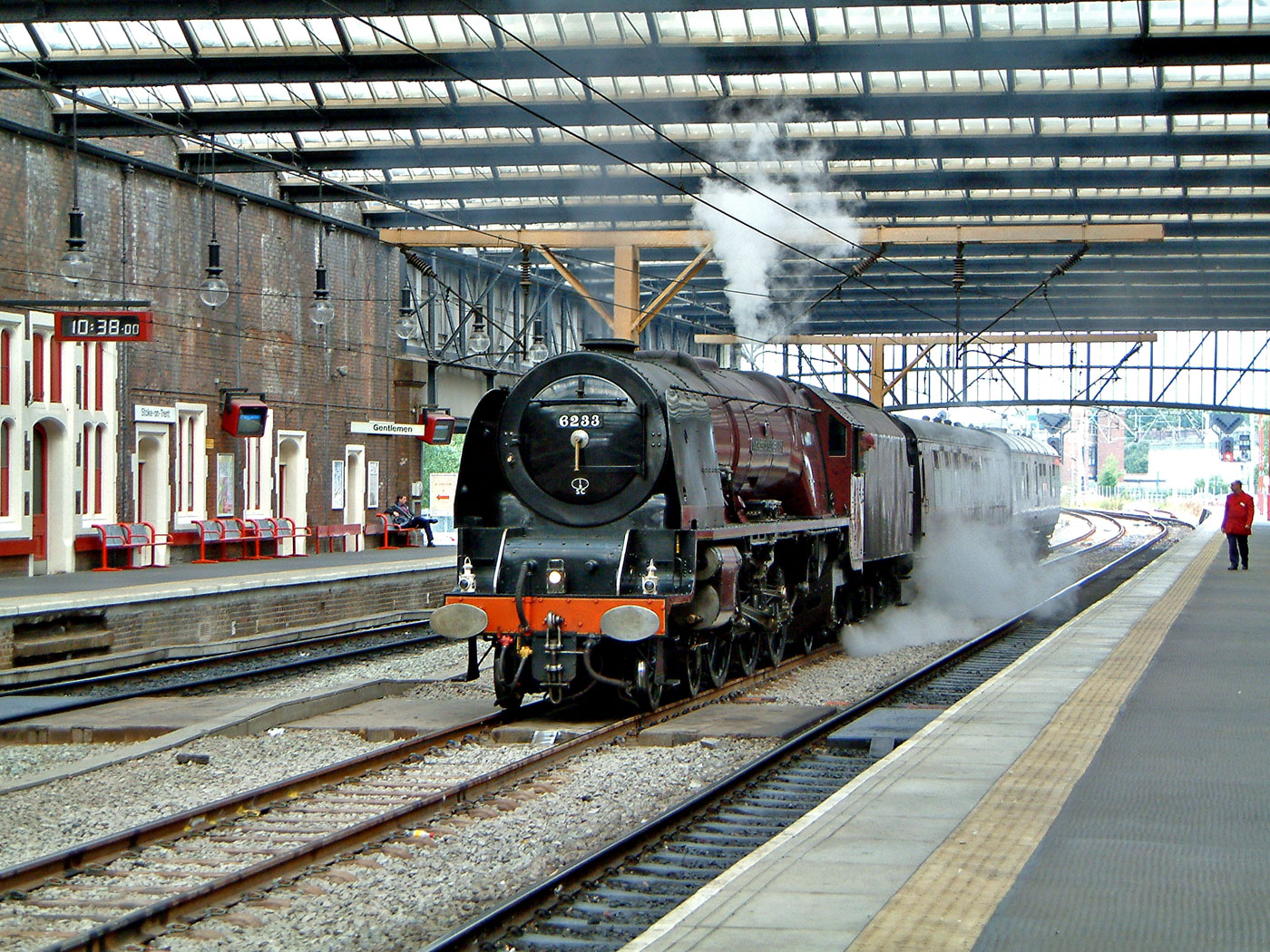
LMS Princess Coronation Class 6233 Duchess of Sutherland on the now-removed through line in July 2004, with platform 1 on the right and platform 2 on the left; the bay platform 3 is at the back left

The station has three passenger platforms:

1. for south and eastbound services to Derby, Stafford and London Euston
2. for north and westbound services to Crewe, Macclesfield, Stockport and Manchester Piccadilly
3. a bay, for northbound stopping services to Manchester Piccadilly.

There was a central through-line without a platform, but this was removed in May 2009; platform 1 was also lengthened to accommodate longer trains.

== Facilities ==
Stoke-on-Trent station is owned by Network Rail and is managed by Avanti West Coast. The main entrance to the station is from Winton Square, opposite the North Stafford Hotel, into a large modern booking hall; it has an enquiry office, ticket machines, a cashpoint and level access to platform 1. On this platform are the main buildings, refreshment room and bar, free CCTV-covered racks for 66 bicycles, a post box, toilets, a refurbished waiting room, a first class lounge with wi-fi and offices for the British Transport Police. There is both a tiled passenger subway and a passenger operated lift connecting platform 1 with 2 and 3.

The station building retains much of its mid-Victorian character, including a classic glazed roof, built in 1893, that spans the platforms. A war memorial, with brass nameplates naming the employees of the North Staffordshire Railway who died during World War I, discreetly flanks the entrance to platform 1. The station underwent restoration work in the 1990s, having fallen into disrepair.

== Services ==
The station lies on both the Stafford-Manchester and the Crewe-Derby lines; it is also served by trains between London Euston and Manchester Piccadilly via the Trent Valley line.

=== Service frequency ===
The station is currently served by five train operating companies; these provide the following general off-peak services, in trains per hour/day (tph/tpd):

Avanti West Coast:

- 2 tph to London Euston; of which:
  - 1 tph calls at Rugby and Milton Keynes Central
  - 1 tph calls at Nuneaton
- 2 tph to Manchester Piccadilly, via Stockport; of which:
  - 1 tph also calls at Macclesfield.

CrossCountry:

- 1 tph to Bristol Temple Meads, via Birmingham New Street; of which:
  - 2 tpd extend to Paignton, via Exeter St Davids
- 1 tph to Bournemouth, via Birmingham New Street, Coventry, Reading and Southampton Central
- 2 tph to Manchester Piccadilly, via Macclesfield and Stockport.

East Midlands Railway:

- 1 tph to Lincoln, via Derby and Nottingham
- 1 tph to Crewe.

London Northwestern Railway:

- 1tph to Stafford, via Stone
- 1tph to Crewe.

Northern Trains:

- 1 tph to Manchester Piccadilly, via Macclesfield and Stockport (stopping service).

| Preceding station | National Rail | Following station |
|---|---|---|
| Stafford | CrossCountry South West and South Coast to Manchester | Macclesfield |
| Nuneaton | Avanti West Coast WCML Stoke branch | Macclesfield |
| Rugby | Avanti West Coast WCML Stoke branch | Stockport |
| Longton | East Midlands Railway Crewe–Derby line | Longport |
| Longport towards Crewe | London Northwestern Railway Stafford–Crewe | Stone towards Stafford |
| Terminus | Northern Trains Stoke-on-Trent–Manchester Piccadilly | Kidsgrove |
| Terminus | Northern Trains Stoke-on-Trent–Manchester Piccadilly | Longport Limited Service |
| | Previous services | |
| Stafford | CrossCountry Cross Country Route Monday–Saturday Peak Hours Only | Congleton |
Historical railways
| Etruria Line open, station closed | North Staffordshire Railway Crewe–Derby line Potteries Loop Line | Fenton Line open, station closed |
| Etruria Line open, station closed | North Staffordshire Railway Stafford–Manchester line | Whieldon Road Halt Line open, station closed |
| Etruria Line open, station closed | North Staffordshire Railway Sandbach to Stoke Line | Terminus |
Disused railways
| Hartshill and Basford Halt Line and station closed | North Staffordshire Railway Stoke to Market Drayton Line | Terminus |
| Terminus | North Staffordshire Railway Biddulph Valley line | Fenton Manor Line and station closed |

=== Freight ===
Freight trains on Mondays, carrying Cornish clay for use in Stoke's pottery industry, pass through the station. These trains supply an industrial spur line at Cliffe Vale, just north of Stoke station.

Freight trains on Fridays also take various freight wagons from Arpley Sidings, near Warrington, to Axiom Rail (Stoke Marcroft) for general repairs, maintenance and sometimes conversions. The return up to Arpley Sidings, with completed wagons, normally happens on the same day.

=== Future proposals ===
There are proposals to reopen the mothballed Stoke–Leek line. This would allow Leek to be reconnected to the National Rail network for the first time in 40 years, via Fenton Manor, allowing for future metro services. The plan has received approval from the county council and is in the early construction phase of a new station at Leek and the connecting railway.

== Onward connections ==
Local bus services serve two stops on Station Road, which are provided by First Potteries, D&G Bus and Arriva. Routes run to Hanley, Stoke-on-Trent, and Newcastle-under-Lyme town centres, and also Keele University. Most services connect at Hanley bus station.

In October 2020, Stoke-on-Trent City Council proposed a tram network. Stoke station would connect to Hanley, with onward trams to Tunstall and Burslem.

== Hand with Chronos ==
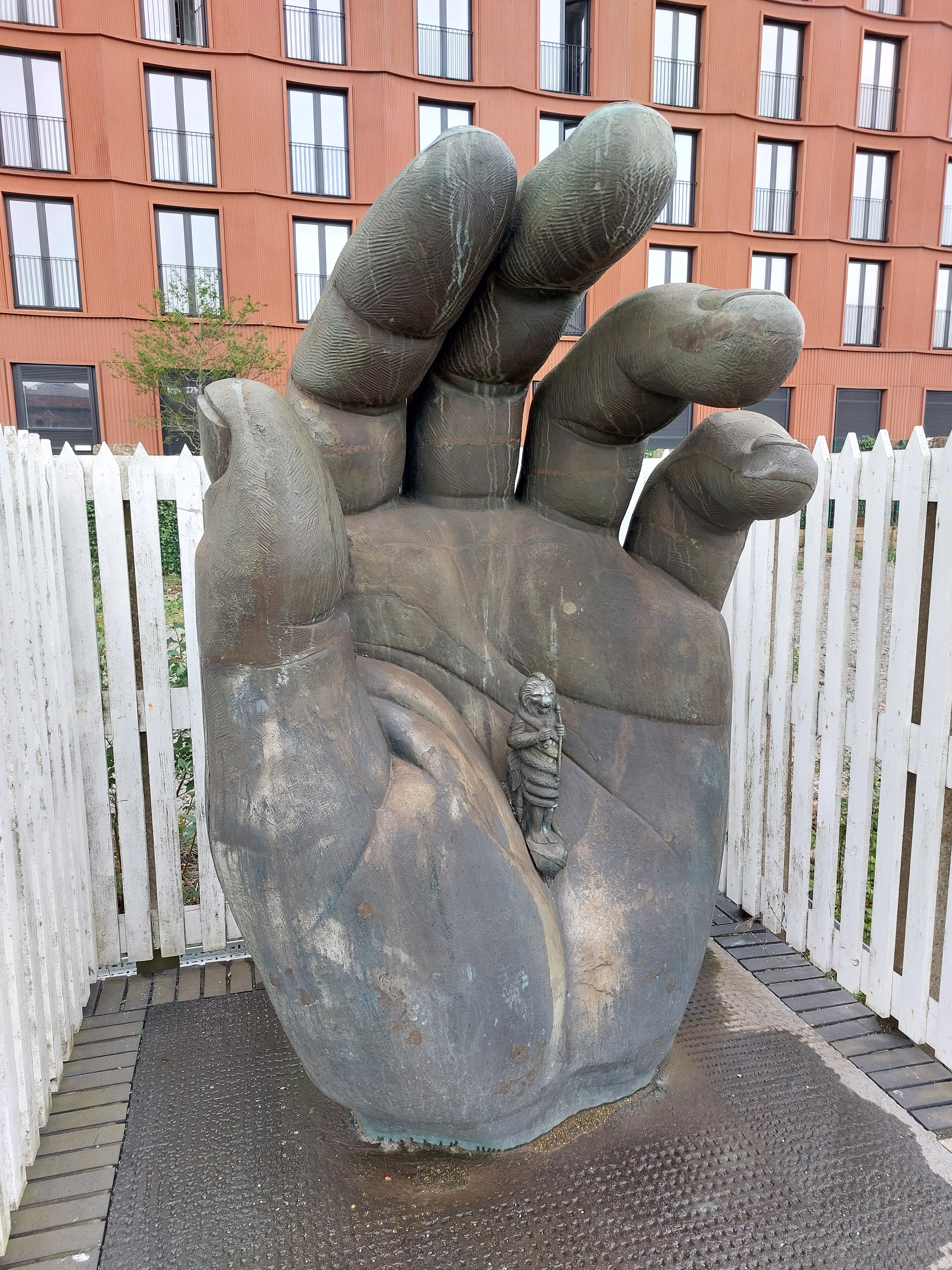

Vincent Woropay's Hand with Chronos is a large statue installed at the London end of platform 2. It was originally created for the 1990 National Garden Festival in response to a BR commission.

== The station's surroundings ==
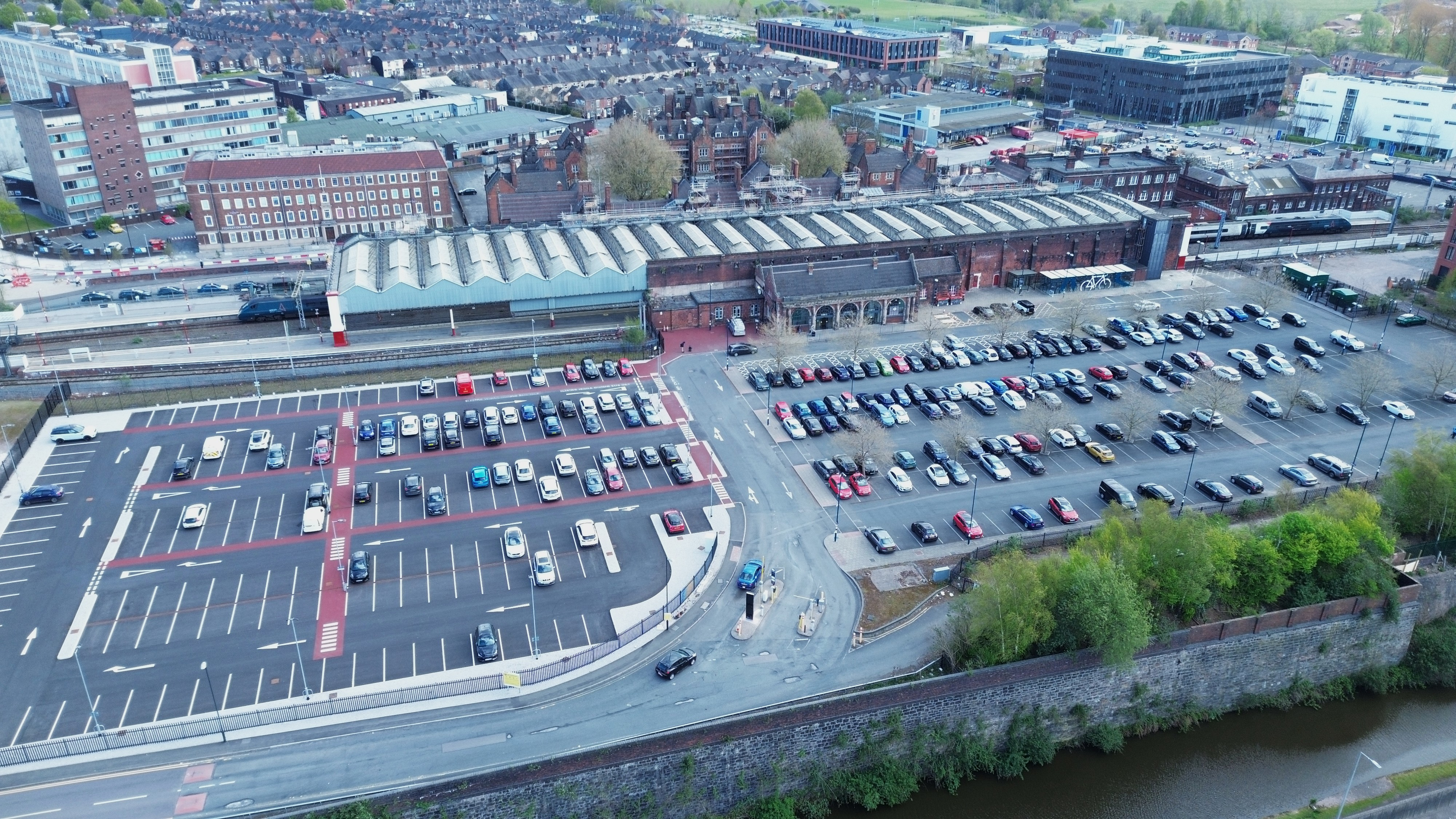
An aerial view of the station

The original, now disused, goods yard lies behind the northbound platforms. There were various proposals for its use, including an "iconic" conference centre. However, in April 2007, Virgin Trains announced that 264 new car parking spaces would be made available at Stoke-on-Trent station by January 2009, adding to the two existing small car parks. A new access road, junction and traffic lights were constructed to serve the goods yard road entrance, when the A500 upgrade was completed in 2006/7. The new car park opened October 2009.

Winton Chambers (a self-contained section of the main station building, including the entire upper floor) is currently leased to the University of Staffordshire, which has its main Stoke-on-Trent campuses in College Road, off Station Road, and in Leek Road nearby. The university also leases nos. 1, 2 & 3 Winton Square and nos. 4 & 5 Winton Square which, with the North Stafford Hotel and the current station, comprise the original 1848 station complex. There is also a Subway outlet situated to the right of the hotel.

Directly opposite the station entrance is the statue of potter Josiah Wedgwood (1730–1795), sculpted by Edward Davis and erected in 1863. Wedgwood holds in his hand an exact copy of the Portland Vase, the reproduction of which showed the British that they could at last surpass the achievements of the finest craftsmen of the Roman Empire. The statue stands in front of the North Stafford Hotel.

Also directly opposite the station is the British Pottery Manufacturer's Federation Club (The Potter's Club), which is a large private members' club situated in Federation House. Established in 1951, it is run for the benefit of the many local pottery manufacturers.

Also the main Royal Mail depot for Stoke-on-Trent is located opposite the station, next to the North Stafford Hotel. Until the early 1990s, mail arrived from all over the county into Stoke station and then transferred across the road to the sorting office.

=== University Quarter ===
Staffordshire University has expanded rapidly in recent years and a large area to the north-east of the station is now seen as a developing University Quarter. It now absorbs the relocated sixth-form college, previously sited a mile or so to the south at Fenton, and the main further education college just to the north and possibly also the Burslem campus of Stoke-on-Trent College. This £150m "quarter regeneration" will also entail investment in the immediate surroundings of the station.
