= Wall Grange railway station =

Former railway station in Staffordshire, England

Wall Grange
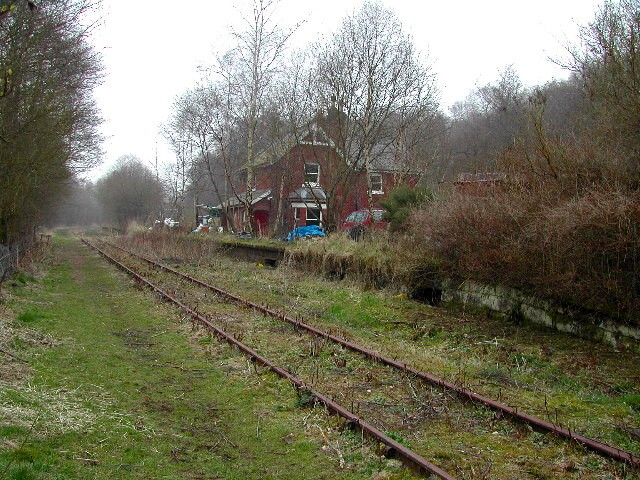
- The station buildings pictured in 2003

General information
- Location: Staffordshire Moorlands; England
- Coordinates: 53.0795°N 2.0575°W
- Grid reference: SJ962535
- Platforms: 2

Other information
- Status: Disused

History
- Original company: North Staffordshire Railway
- Post-grouping: London, Midland & Scottish Railway

Key dates
- 1873: Opened
- 7 May 1956: Closed
Location

Wall Grange railway station is a disused railway station that served the villages of Longsdon and Cheddleton in Staffordshire, England.

== History ==
The Stoke–Leek line was opened by the North Staffordshire Railway (NSR) in 1867 and a station to serve the village of Wall Grange was opened in 1873, first appearing in Bradshaw's Guide in November 1873. The line has originally been constructed as single track throughout from Milton Junction (where the line diverged from the Biddulph Valley line) to Leek Brook Junction but was doubled in 1910 for half its length between Endon and Leek Brook. Originally built with a single platform, the station was on the double line section and a second platform was added when the line was doubled.

When the NSR become part of the London, Midland and Scottish Railway, the station name was changed to Wall Grange & Longsdon.

Passenger services over the line were withdrawn in 1956 and the station closed to passenger traffic. The line through the closed station was singled in 1971 but the platform and some of the station buildings remain in existence. The line through the station continued in use until 1988 for freight services and since 1988 the line has officially been out of use but not closed.

== Route ==
Preceding station	Disused railways	Following station
Endon; Line disused, station closed	North Staffordshire Railway; Stoke–Leek line	Leek Brook; Line disused, station closed
