= Blythe Bridge railway station =

Railway station in Staffordshire, England

Coordinates: 52.968°N 2.067°W

Blythe Bridge
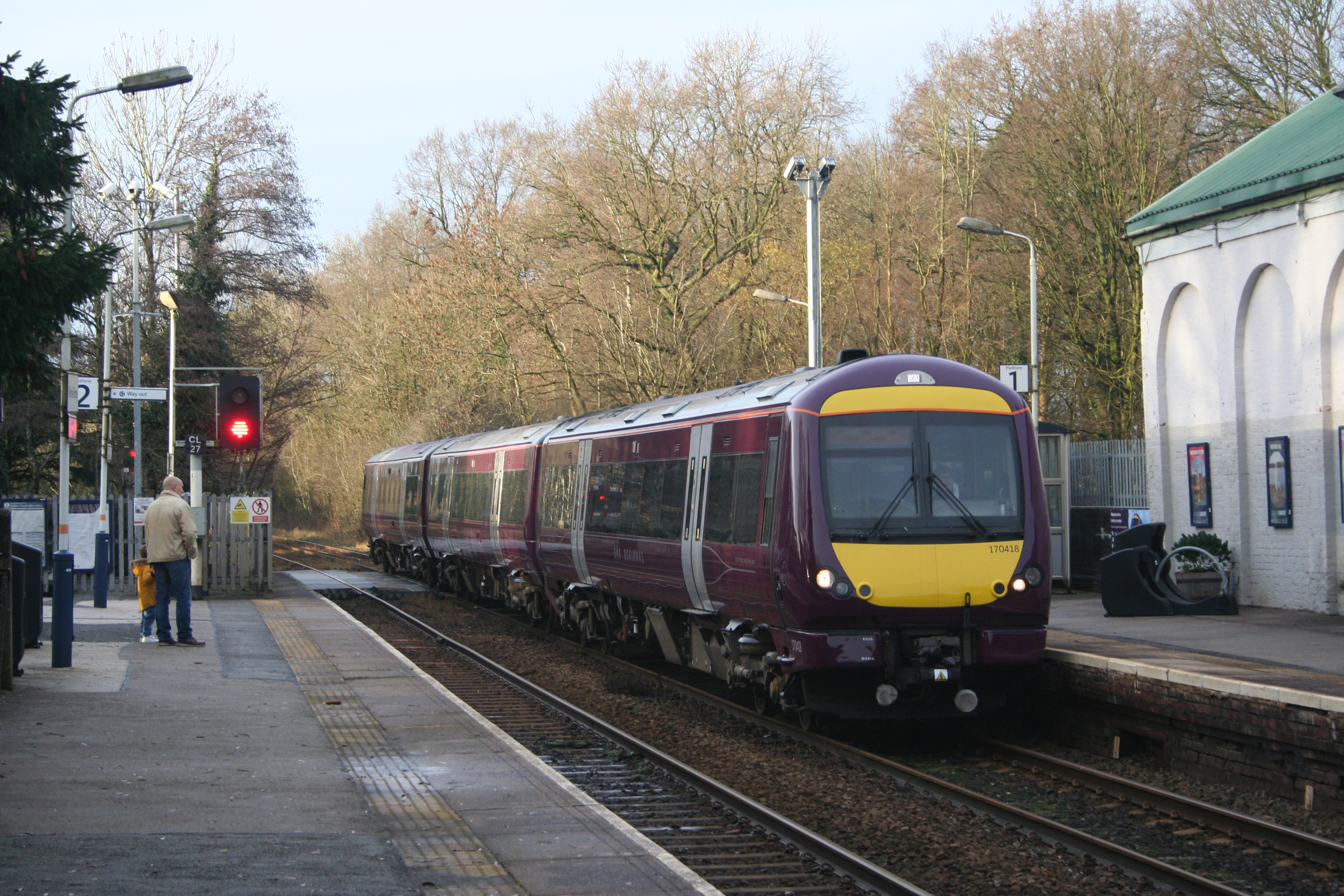
- An East Midlands Railway Class 170 DMU arriving at Blythe Bridge railway station in December 2020

General information
- Location: Blythe Bridge, Staffordshire Moorlands; England
- Grid reference: SJ956411
- Manager: East Midlands Railway
- Platforms: 2

Other information
- Station code: BYB
- Classification: DfT category F2

History
- Original company: North Staffordshire Railway
- Pre-grouping: North Staffordshire Railway
- Post-grouping: London, Midland and Scottish Railway

Key dates
- 7 August 1848: Opened as "Blyth Bridge"
- 1907: Renamed "Blythe Bridge"

Passengers
- 2021/22: ▲70,590
- 2022/23: ▲72,300
- 2023/24: ▲77,568
- 2024/25: ▲0.104 million
- 2025/26: ▲0.135 million
Location
Notes
- Passenger statistics from the Office of Rail and Road

Blythe Bridge railway station in Blythe Bridge, Staffordshire, England, is served by trains on the Crewe to Derby Line; it is also a Community rail line known as the North Staffordshire line. The station is owned by Network Rail and managed by East Midlands Railway. The full range of tickets for travel are purchased from the guard on the train at no extra cost.

The station was opened on 7 August 1848 by the North Staffordshire Railway (NSR). Until 1907 the spelling of the station name was Blyth Bridge. The station buildings were demolished in the early 1990s and today it is unstaffed.

In 2010 it won East Midlands Trains' Best Small Station award.

== Signalling ==
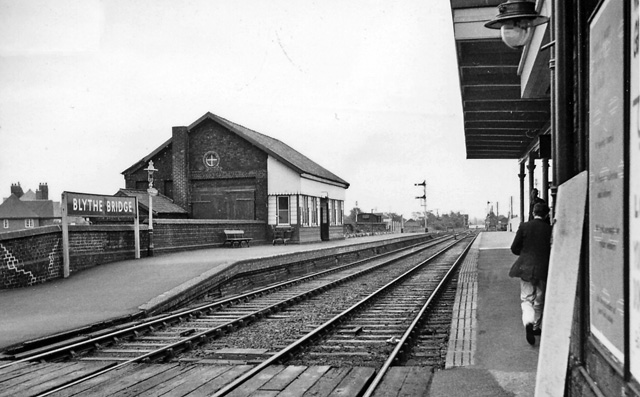
Blythe Bridge in 1962

Blythe Bridge had two signal boxes, namely Blythe Bridge and Stallington, both of which controlled level crossings, which was a common feature across the former NSR.

The signal boxes were opened by the NSR in 1884 for the Derby to Stoke line. The boxes were built to a standard McKenzie & Holland design and under the S.R.S. designation system is referred to as a MKH Type1.

The signal boxes were equipped with a standard McKenzie & Holland lever frame and a gate wheel for operating the level crossing gates which controlled traffic on the former A50. These gates were later replaced by a barrier crossing when traffic increased.

Blythe Bridge and Stallington signal boxes closed in 1980 and 1989 respectively and the level crossing was converted to CCTV control with the barriers supervised by Caverswall signal box. Both signal boxes were demolished soon after.

== Services ==
All services at Blythe Bridge are operated by East Midlands Railway.

On weekdays and Saturdays, the station is generally served by an hourly service westbound to Crewe via Stoke-on-Trent and eastbound to Lincoln via Derby and Nottingham. During the late evenings, services terminate at Nottingham instead of Lincoln.

On Sundays, the station is served by an hourly service between Crewe and Derby only although no trains operate before 14:00.

Preceding station	National Rail	Following station
Longton	East Midlands Railway Crewe to Derby Line	Uttoxeter
	Historical railways	
Meir Line open, station closed	North Staffordshire Railway Crewe to Derby Line	Cresswell Line open, station closed

== Foxfield Railway ==
The station is situated 1/2 mile (0.80 km) south of Caverswall Road railway station, the current southern terminus of the Foxfield Railway.
