= Biddulph Valley line =

Former railway in North West England

The Biddulph Valley line was a double tracked railway line that ran from Stoke-on-Trent to Brunswick Wharf in Congleton. The line was named after the town of the same name , as it ran via the Staffordshire Moorlands and covered areas of East Staffordshire and Cheshire.

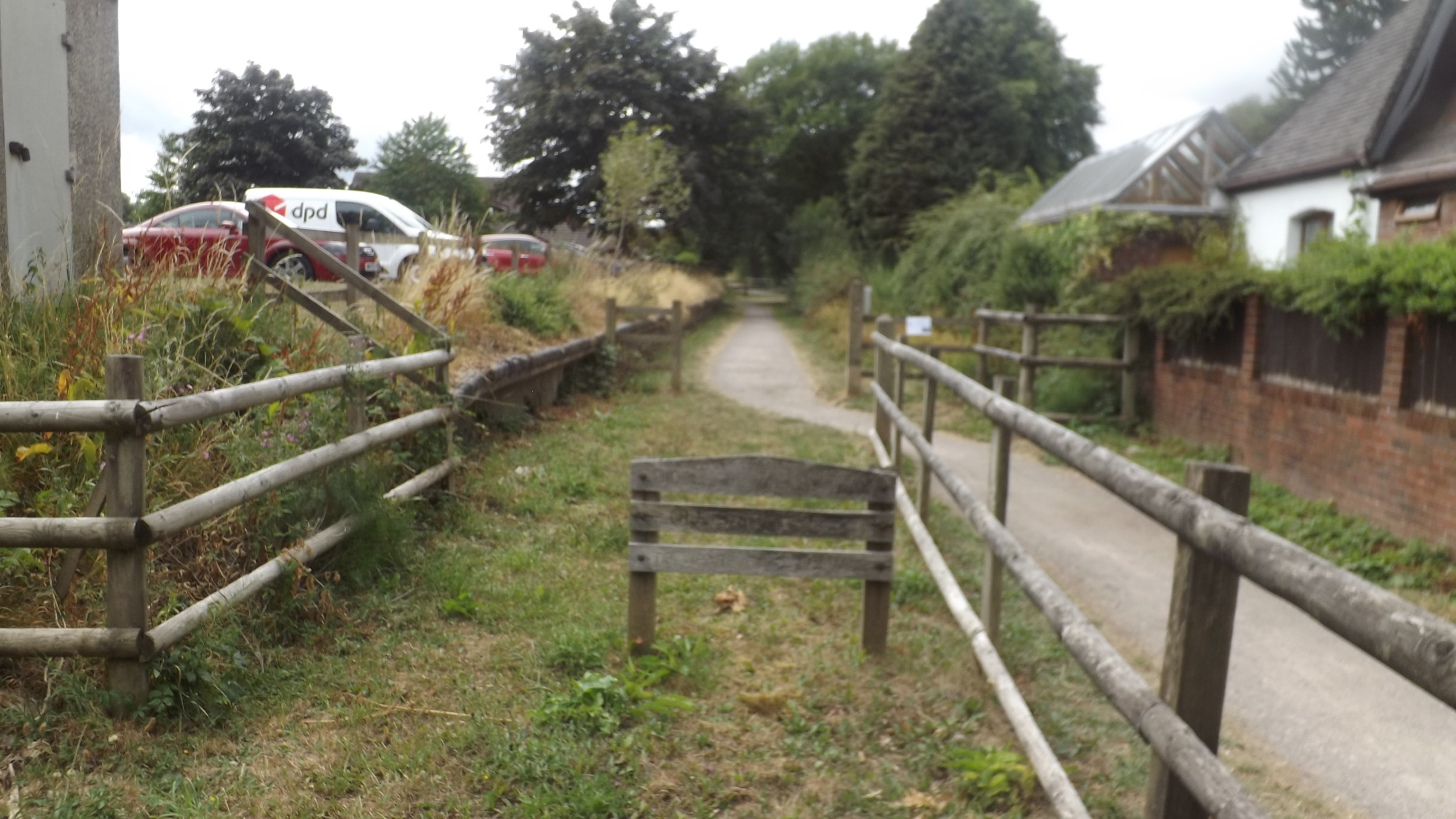
Biddulph Valley Way passing through the former Biddulph railway station

== Opening ==
The Biddulph Valley line was authorised by an act of parliament on 24 July 1854, with a budget of £190,000. It was promoted heavily by the owners of local collieries, including brothers James Bateman and John Bateman and the mayor of Congleton.

Construction of the line began on 27 April 1858 and was built by the North Staffordshire Railway, who were responsible for opening of other lines in the surrounding areas of Staffordshire.

The line opened in sections to mineral traffic, with the first part opening to Childerplay. Following another act of parliament in 1859, the remaining 4 1/2 miles of track were laid for mineral traffic with an additional £35,000, opening in 1860.

Stations opened along the line in 1864. The stations at Ford Green & Smallthorne, Black Bull and Biddulph opened on the same day, 1 June 1864. Subsequently, halts at Chell, Knypersley and Mossley opened between 1890 and 1919. Passenger services ran from Stoke to Congleton, involving a reversal of direction at Congleton Junction where the Biddulph Valley line met the main line between Manchester London Road and Congleton.

The line was also linked to the Stoke–Leek line, which was connected to the same junction as the Churnet Valley Line, and the Waterhouses branch line.

== Stations and halts ==
The line was connected to the same line as the Leek Brook to Stoke Line.

- Stoke-on-Trent (still open)
- Fenton Manor (closed in 1956 but the line through the station remained open to freight traffic until 1988 when the line was mothballed)
- Bucknall and Northwood (closed in 1956 but remained open to freight traffic same as Fenton Manor)
- Ford Green and Smallthorne (Burslem)
- Chell Halt (was only used for the nearby Chatterley Whitfield Colliery)
- Black Bull (Biddulph)
- Knypersley Halt (Biddulph)
- Biddulph (Biddulph)
- Mossley Halt (Mossley in Congleton)
- Congleton (still open).

== Decline ==
The stations along the line closed to passengers in 1927, due to low usage, while the halts closed earlier between 1923 and 1927; freight traffic, mainly coal, continued.

Closure came in stages:

- Congleton Upper Junction to Congleton Lower Junction closed on 1 December 1963; all long-distance traffic from Brunswick Wharf in Congleton then had to come via Stoke.
- Brunswick Wharf to Heath Junction followed on 15 January 1969
- Heath Junction to Ford Green, when rail traffic ceased at Victoria Colliery in January 1976
- The last section, from Ford Green to Milton Junction, was taken out of use on the closure of Norton Colliery in June 1977.

In 1952, a special passenger train ran from Crewe along four closed North Staffordshire railway lines; this included the Biddulph Valley Line.

All stations, with the exception of Biddulph, were demolished after closure; the track was lifted from Bucknall and Northwood to the junction near Congleton.

== The line today ==
The line from Stoke-on-Trent to Bucknall and Northwood remained in use for stone traffic to and from Oakamoor and Caldon, where it served the sand sidings and the quarries. Subsequently, the line was mothballed in 1988 when the sand traffic ended.

The track bed from Ford Green & Smallthorne to Mossley, via Biddulph, now forms the Biddulph Valley Way, a shared-use path; it follows the course of the whole line.
