= Biddulph railway station =

Former railway station in Staffordshire, England

Biddulph
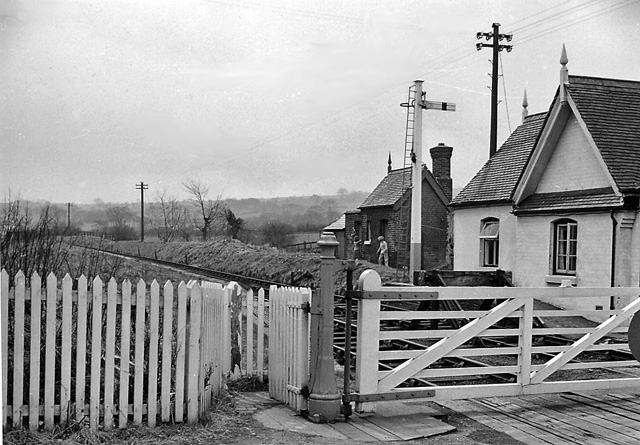
- Biddulph station in 1962

General information
- Location: Biddulph, Staffordshire Moorlands; England
- Coordinates: 53.1214°N 2.1802°W
- Grid reference: SJ881583
- Platforms: 2

Other information
- Status: Disused

History
- Original company: North Staffordshire Railway
- Post-grouping: London, Midland and Scottish Railway

Key dates
- 1 June 1864: Opened as Gillow Heath
- 1 May 1897: Renamed Biddulph
- 11 July 1927: Closed to passengers
- 5 October 1964: Closed to all traffic
Location

Biddulph railway station was opened by the North Staffordshire Railway in 1864; it served the town of Biddulph, in Staffordshire, England, until its closure in 1964.

== History ==
Originally named Gillow Heath, the station was renamed Biddulph on 1 May 1897. It was a stop on the Biddulph Valley line that ran from a junction just north of Congleton on the Stoke-on-Trent – Macclesfield line to a junction south of Stoke-on-Trent station.

Passenger traffic was withdrawn from the station on 11 July 1927, but freight traffic continued until 5 October 1964.

Preceding station	Disused railways	Following station
Mossley Halt Line and station closed	North Staffordshire Railway Biddulph Valley line	Knypersley Halt Line and station closed

== The site today ==
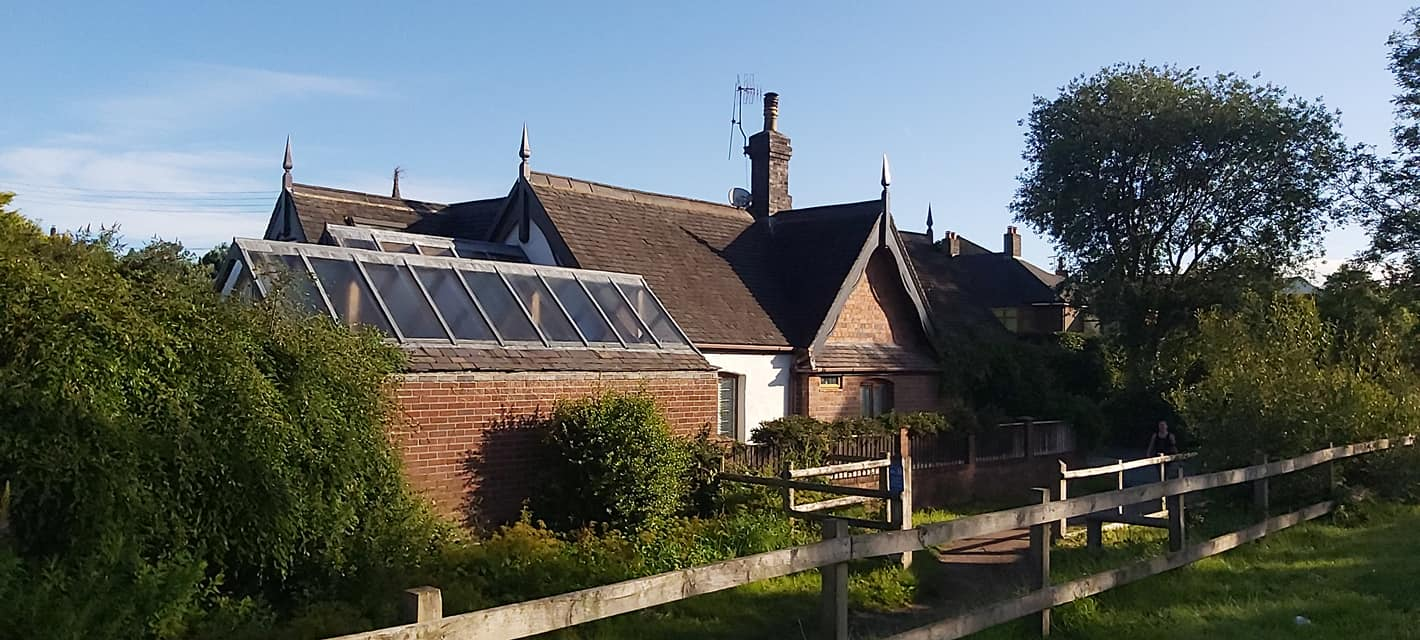
Biddulph station in 2020

Parts of the station platform are extant and one of the original buildings is now a private residence. The trackbed now forms the Biddulph Valley Way.
