= The Story of the Club-Footed Grocer =

- Short story by Sir Arthur Conan Doyle
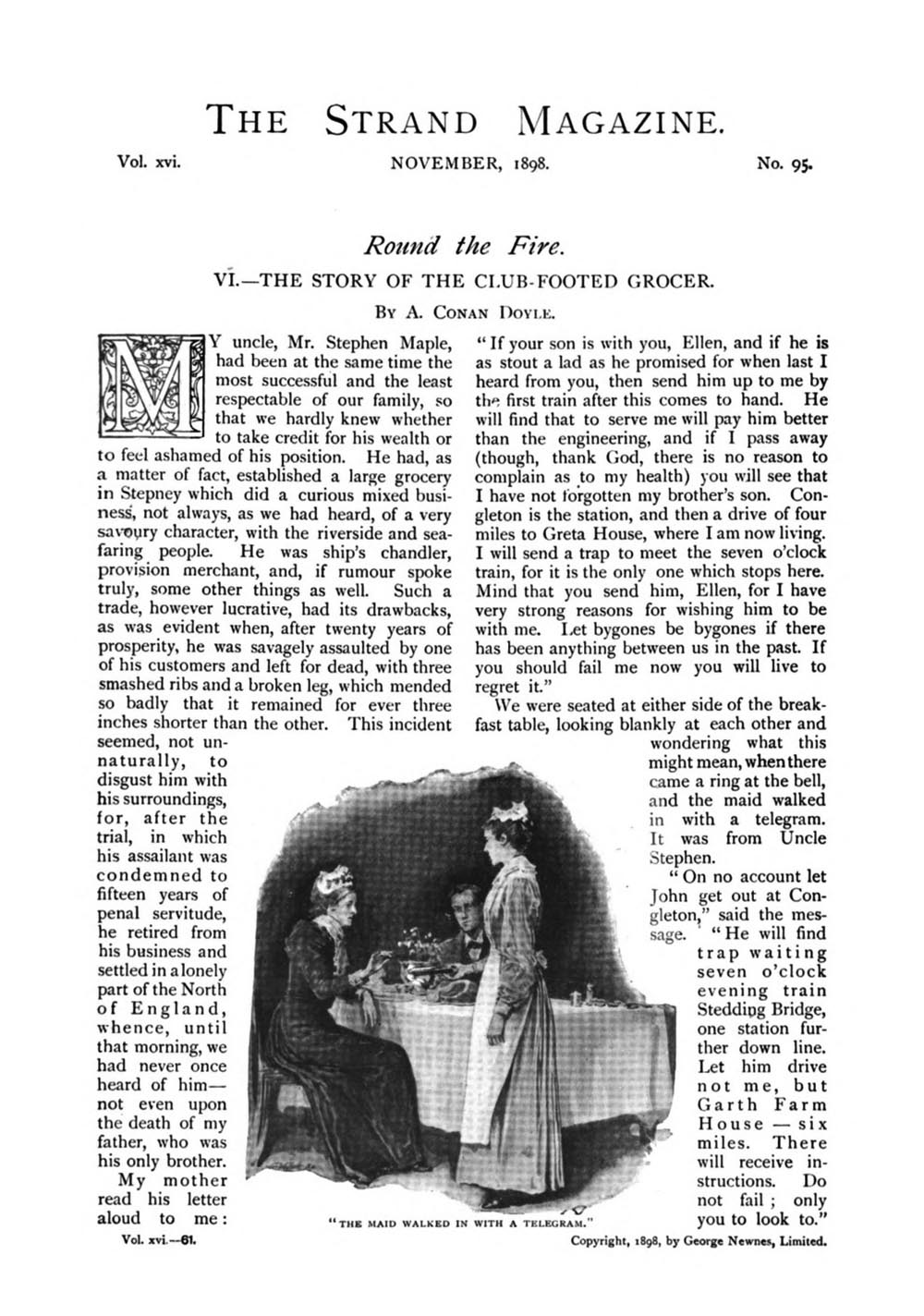

Text available at Wikisource
- Country: United Kingdom
- Language: English

Publication
- Published in: The Strand Magazine
- Publication type: Print, magazine
- Publication date: November 1898

"The Story of the Club-Footed Grocer" is a short story by Sir Arthur Conan Doyle, first published in The Strand Magazine in November 1898.

== Plot summary ==
The story is narrated by John Maple, whose uncle, Stephen Maple, is "the most successful and the least respectable of our family". Stephen operates a grocery in Stepney which is reputed to do unsavoury trade with sailors. After he is assaulted and left with a shortened leg, Stephen retires to north England. Stephen writes to John's mother asking for John to come to Congleton railway station to serve him, adding ominously "If you should fail me now you will live to regret it." As John and his mother are contemplating the letter, they receive a telegram from Stephen instructing John to instead alight at an earlier station, Stedding Bridge, and travel from there to Garth Farm. As John prepares to leave, they receive a further telegram instructing him to bring a gun.

Alighting at Stedding Bridge, John boards a trap driven by William. On the way to Garth Farm, they are interpreted by a sailor who asks for a lift; the driver refuses. John notes that the driver seems troubled. Arriving at Garth Farm, John meets the farmer, Purcell. While eating a meal, Purcell's wife appears to try and encourage John to return to London. Upon nightfall, John sets out across the moorland for his uncle's home, Greta House, with William as his guide. During the journey, William forces John to hide when they encounter a man with a "thin, hungry face". William tells John that several people have arrived on the moorland and are watching Greta House.

Arriving at Greta House, John meets his uncle, who sends William home. John notes that Stephen has a built-up boot to compensate for his injured leg, which creates "a curious clack-click" noise as he walks. Stephen warms John not to walk in front of the window in case he is shot. Stephen shows John a recent article from the Western Morning News concerning the early release of a convict, Elias, from Dartmoor Prison. Stephen explains that Elias - the man John and William encountered on the moorland - is the man who attacked him previously, and that he wants John to help him relocate to Leeds, where he believes he will be safer. John unsuccessfully tries to persuade Stephen to approach the police.

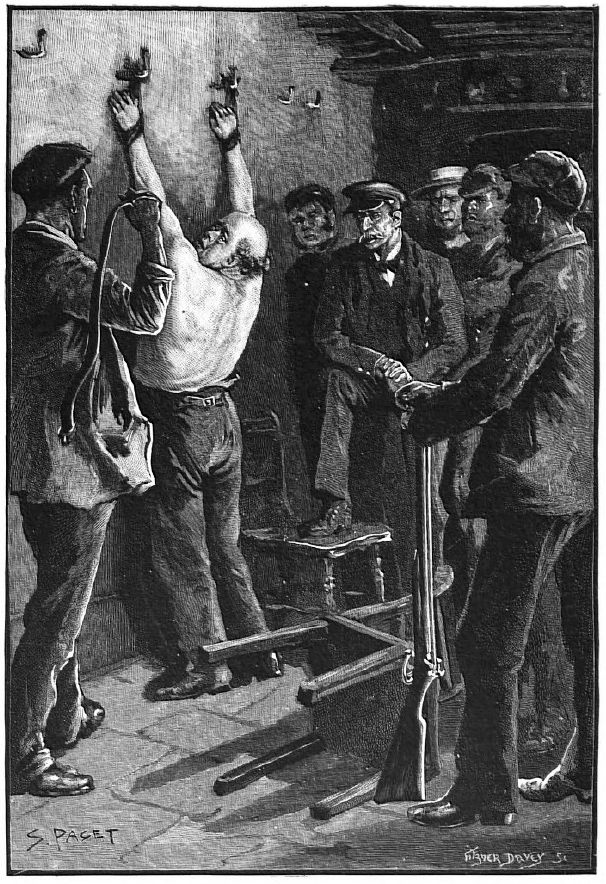
An illustration by Sidney Paget, depicting Elias and his men preparing to flog Stephen.

As John and Stephen talk, there is a banging on the door, and a slip of paper reading "Put them out on the doorstep and save your skin" is pushed into the building. When John asks Stephen what they want, he cryptically replies "What they'll never 'ave!" Stephen dispatches his loyal servant, Enoch, to Garth Farm to instruct Purcell to bring a cart early the following morning to make for Congleton railway station. Sometime later, they hear a scream, and see a cloaked man fleeing towards the house. Opening the door to admit him, they realise too late that it is Elias disguised as Enoch. The sailors force their way into the house and restrain John and Stephen.

After the sailors threaten to flog Stephen with a belt unless he confesses to the location of "what you've stolen", he leads the sailors upstairs. As John makes to flee the house, his uncle falls from the window above to the ground, breaking his spine and killing him immediately. Returning downstairs, the sailors claim that Stephen jumped of his own accord. Elias makes to kill John as the only witness, but several of the sailors demur. As they argue, Elias notices that the built-up sole of Stephen's boot has burst open, scattering diamonds on the path. As the sailors collect the diamonds, one of them prompts John to flee.

Making for Garth Farm, John encounters Enoch, beaten but alive. Enoch tells John that Stephen had made money from buying stolen goods from thieves. On one occasion, Elias, the captain of the brig Black Mogul, gave him diamonds stolen from an African steamer for safekeeping; when Elias returned to retrieve the diamonds, Stephen refused to hand them over, causing Elias to attack him. Elias was imprisoned for the attack, but upon his release had followed Stephen northward in pursuit of the diamonds.

John finishes the story by recounting that a cutter that been seen off the coast had travelled down the Irish Sea that morning, which he presumes was Elias and his men departing. William leaves little wealth behind after his death, with the result that "...his disreputable name when living was not atoned for by any posthumous benevolence, and the family, equally scandalized by his life and by his death, have finally buried all memory of the club-footed grocer of Stepney."

== Publication ==
"The Story of the Club-Footed Grocer" was first published in volume 16, number 95 of The Strand Magazine in November 1898, with illustrations by Doyle's frequent collaborator Sidney Paget. In 1908, it was collected in Doyle's book Round the Fire Stories.
