= City Sentral =

Coordinates: 53.02°N 2.17°W

- Location: Stoke-on-Trent, Staffordshire, England
- Opened: Cancelled
- Developer: Realis Estates
- Floor area: 60,387 m^{2} (650,000 sq ft)
- Floors: 3
- Parking: 1,000
- Website: citysentral.co.uk

City Sentral was a planned major retail and leisure development in city of Stoke-on-Trent, Staffordshire, England. It was proposed by Realis Estates, and was a planned 650,000 sq ft (60,000 m^{2}) regional shopping centre which was due to open in 2016. The centre was to include a Marks & Spencer department store, a wide range of new stores and shops, cafés and restaurants, 'vibrant public spaces', a Cineworld cinema complex, an 80-room hotel, parking for 1,000 cars and a new bus station.

City Sentral's proposed catchment comprised 870,000 people with more than 360,000 people living within 20 minutes drive of the city centre.

The architects for the bus station were Grimshaw Architects and Benoy was working on City Sentral.

The branding of the proposed shopping centre divided residents in the city with many suggesting the deliberate misspelling of the word 'central' was unnecessary and open to ridicule. City councillors were asked to support a motion demanding Realis changed the name but it was rejected on the grounds that it may deter inward investment.

== History ==
The £350 million regeneration project was intended to transform a prominent but run-down site comprising the existing East West Precinct and bus station. An outline planning application was submitted in October 2008 and consent was granted in February 2009. The Development Agreement was signed in December 2009.

Work on phase 1 (the new bus station) commenced on January 30, 2012 and was completed on March 26, 2013.

In August 2013, the City Council asked Realis to present finalised plans or lose the contract. No progress was made and the scheme was effectively abandoned in December 2014.

A scaled down proposal dubbed Unity Walk was subsequently submitted, but this was in turn abandoned in July 2018. The future of the site is now uncertain.

== Stoke-on-Trent's Mandate For Change ==
City Sentral was part of Stoke-on-Trent City Council's "Mandate for Change" strategy that hoped to see £1.5 billion worth of private and public money invested in the city. As well as City Sentral, regeneration projects included the new CBD office scheme, new homes, new schools and the new University Quarter, new roads and other infrastructure plus new public realm across the city centre.

== Leisure ==
City Sentral was to include 11 restaurant and cafe units and an 80-room hotel.

== Bus Station ==
Grimshaw Architects was appointed to work on the bus station in 2010 following an international design competition that attracted more than 40 entries. The low rise building with its dramatic sweeping roof and glass atrium and public spaces, has been designed as a landmark gateway to the city centre.

The bus station contains 22 new bus stands (2 of which are in the open and without any cover from the elements) and includes comfortable enclosed waiting areas, accessible toilets, CCTV and one solitary shop. Construction for the bus station was due for completion in 2012, but this was later put back to January 2013 and then to April 2013. The delay was blamed on the fact that the planners were unaware of coal mines running directly under the construction site which affected the building of foundations. It has also been realised that the plans do not allow room for buses to wait between passenger runs, so an area on the Park and Ride car park on Hinde Street in Hanley was set aside for buses to be parked while not in use. Permission was given for the Spar supermarket which is the main retailer on the station to sell alcohol between 6 a.m. and 11 p.m., which aroused some public opposition because of the problems of anti-social behaviour associated with alcohol on the old Hanley bus station.

The bus station was completed on March 26, 2013.
