= Winton Square =

Square in Stoke-on-Trent, Staffordshire, England

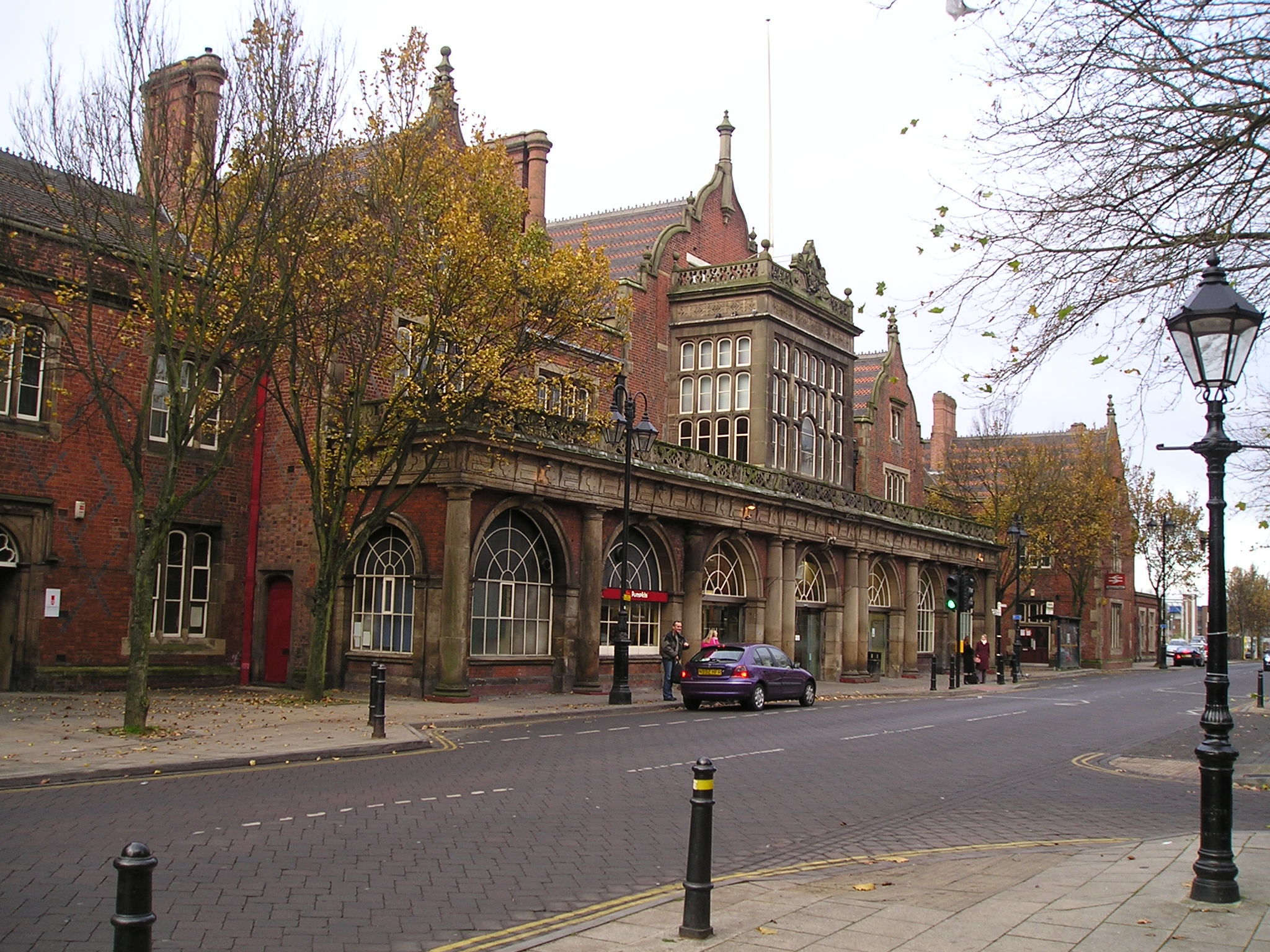
- The Grade II* listed Stoke-on-Trent railway station, located on the square
- Interactive map of Winton Square
- Namesake: Winton's Wood
- Location: Stoke-on-Trent, Staffordshire, England
- Postal code: ST4 2AD
- Coordinates: 53.0082°N 2.1805°W

Construction
- Commissioned: 1846
- Completion: 1848

Other
- Designer: Henry Arthur Hunt

Winton Square in Stoke-on-Trent, Staffordshire, England, houses Stoke-on-Trent railway station, the North Stafford Hotel, and several other historic structures. The square was built in 1848 for the North Staffordshire Railway, whose headquarters were in the station building, and is a significant example of neo-Jacobean architecture. Today, all the buildings and structures in the square are listed buildings and the square is a designated conservation area.

== History and design ==
Prior to the construction of the railways, the land now occupied by Winton Square was known as Winton's Wood in Shelton, a previously independent town now part of Stoke-on-Trent. The area formed part of the glebe land attached to the nearby Church of St. Peter ad Vincula and was named for church rector John Winton. The land remained under the ownership of the church until it was purchased by The North Staffordshire Railway (NSR) in 1846 with the intention of building its principal station and headquarters there.

The square was designed by the NSR's London-based surveyor-architect, Henry Arthur Hunt, and built by John Jay in 1848 for the NSR, which had its headquarters on the upper floor of the station until 1923, when it was amalgamated into the London, Midland and Scottish Railway. The square is described by railway historian Gordon Biddle as "the only piece of town planning to have been deliberately undertaken by a railway company in order to set off its station", in comparison to continental Europe and the United States, where such town planning was more common. Sir Nikolaus Pevsner, in the Staffordshire edition of The Buildings of England, described it as "the finest piece of Victorian axial planning in the country". Pevsner also describes the station and the hotel as the best example of neo-Jacobean architecture in Staffordshire. The square was arguably the main focal point for the town of Stoke-upon-Trent prior to its amalgamation into the much larger city of Stoke-on-Trent in 1910. It is Stoke's only complete square with four blocks of structures, one on each side of the square.

At some point in the 20th century, a row of London plane trees, was planted and formal car-parking space was created.

The square was designated a conservation area in 1972. The hotel and all the buildings besides the station are now in private ownership, but the character of the square has changed little since the 19th century.

== Buildings and structures ==
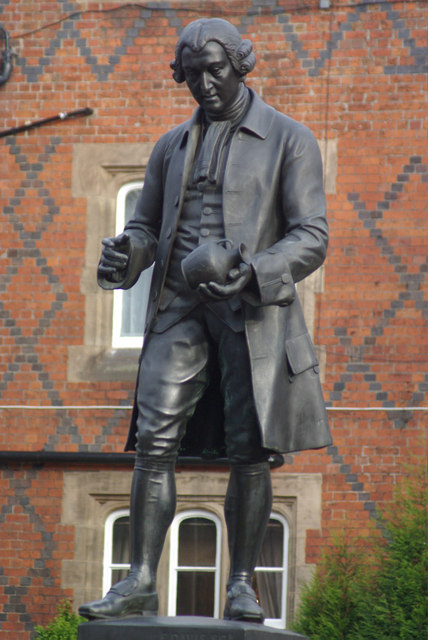
The grade II listed statue of Josiah Wedgwood

The main feature of the square is the station, a grade II* listed building. The station is built from red brick in the style of an Elizabethan manor house. The most prominent features include three large Dutch-style gables and a large ornate first-floor bay window, which covers most of the centre gable. Above the window is a parapet into which the NSR's coat of arms is engraved, and below is a row of seven Tuscan columns which protrude out from the main structure. On the opposite side of the square is the North Stafford hotel, built in a complementary style to the station, though less elaborate. It is a three-storey building built in an Elizabethan-style E-shaped plan and, like the station, constructed mainly of brick. It is a grade II* listed building.

In the centre of the square, between the station and the hotel, is a statue of Josiah Wedgwood, a famous local potter. The statue is bronze, standing on a stone plinth, and is a grade II listed building. It was erected in 1862 by Edward Davies and became a listed building in 1972. The statue was paid for by subscription, and Winton Square was chosen as its site both to reflect the importance of the railways to local industry and because the square was on the boundary between Stoke and Hanley, both of which claimed to be Wedgwood's home. The square is completed by two rows of railway houses, also built by Hunt for the NSR in 1848. The houses, intended for senior NSR employees, are built in a similar style to the station and the hotel but without competing with them. The houses, which are symmetrical on opposite sides of the station are built in an "L" shape and are now used as offices; both terraces are grade II listed buildings.
