= Normacot =

Coordinates: 52.97°N 02.12°W

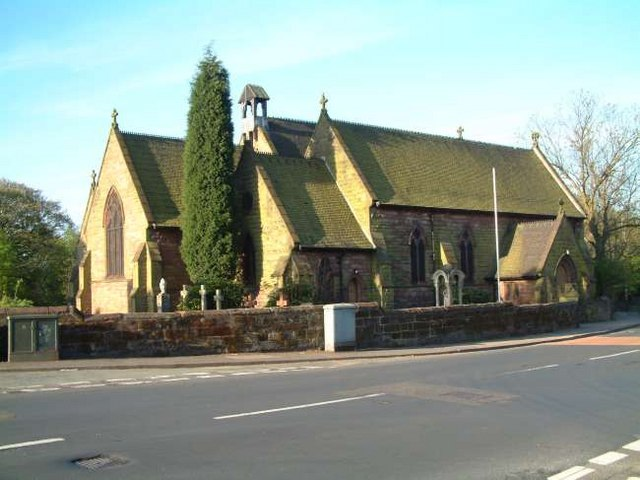

- Location within Staffordshire
- OS grid reference: SJ9242
- District: Stoke-on-Trent
- Shire county: Staffordshire
- Region: West Midlands
- Country: England
- Sovereign state: United Kingdom
- Post town: Stoke-on-Trent
- Postcode district: ST3
- Police: Staffordshire
- Fire: Staffordshire
- Ambulance: West Midlands
- UK Parliament: Stoke-on-Trent South

Normacot is an area of Stoke-on-Trent, Staffordshire, England. Notable buildings include the Church of the Holy Evangelists by Giles Gilbert Scott.

Normacot railway station on the Crewe–Derby line closed in 1964.

It has a large Muslim population.
