= Normacot railway station =

Former railway station in Staffordshire, England

Normacot

General information
- Location: Normacot, Stoke-on-Trent; England
- Coordinates: 52.9837°N 2.1179°W
- Grid reference: SJ920430
- Platforms: 2

Other information
- Status: Disused

History
- Original company: North Staffordshire Railway
- Post-grouping: London, Midland and Scottish Railway; London Midland Region of British Railways

Key dates
- 1 November 1882: Opened
- 2 March 1964: Closed
Location

Normacot railway station served the Normacot area of Stoke-on-Trent, England. It was opened in 1882 by the North Staffordshire Railway on its line to Derby.

The station closed in 1964 and nothing remains of the station today.

Preceding station	Historical railways	Following station
Longton Line and station open	North Staffordshire Railway Crewe to Derby Line	Meir Line open, station closed
