= Ford Green & Smallthorne railway station =

Former railway station in England

Ford Green & Smallthorne
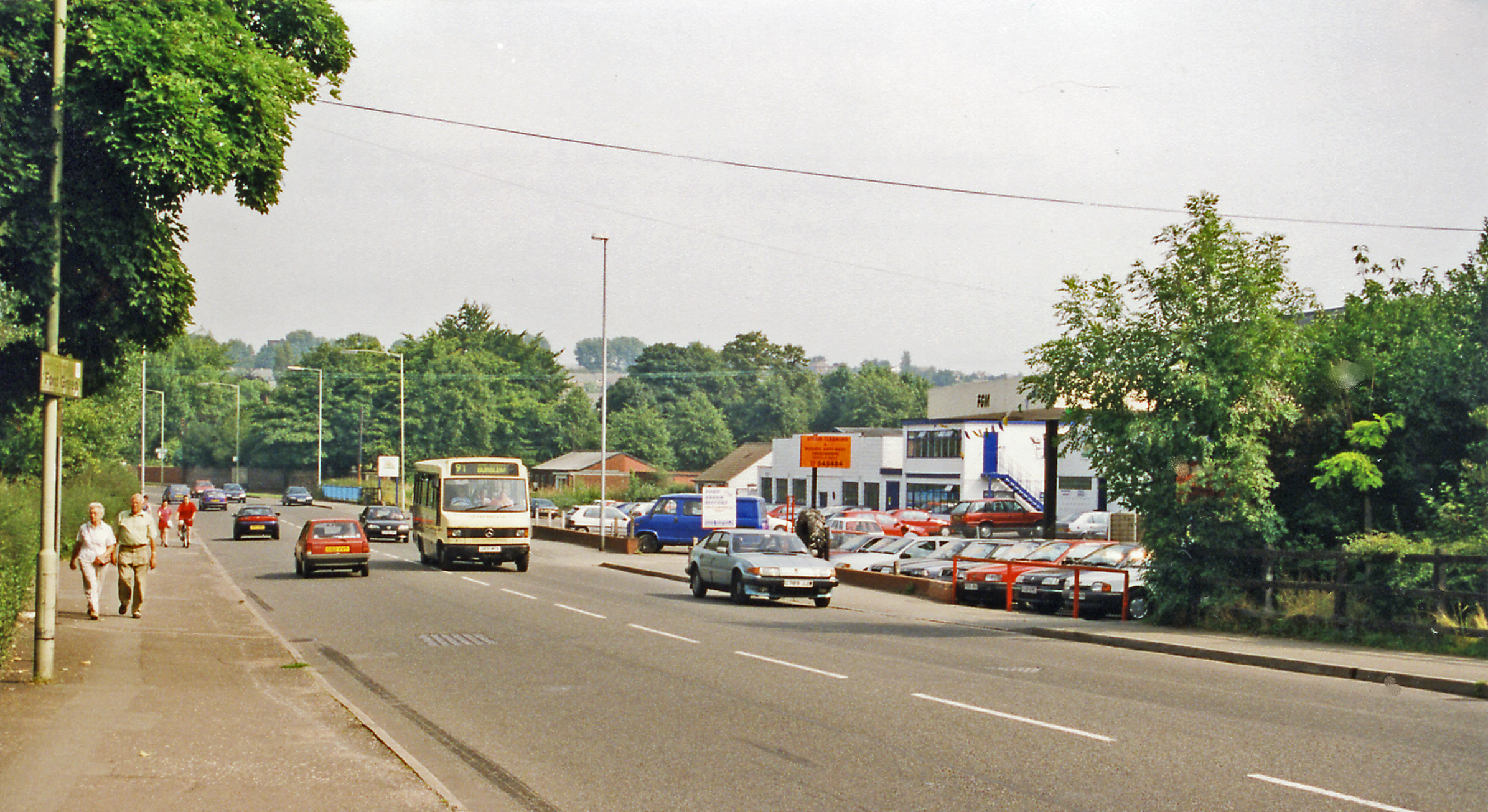
- The site of the station in 1999

General information
- Location: Burslem, Stoke-on-Trent; England
- Coordinates: 53.0543°N 2.1696°W
- Grid reference: SJ887507
- Platforms: 2

Other information
- Status: Disused

History
- Original company: North Staffordshire Railway
- Post-grouping: London, Midland and Scottish Railway

Key dates
- 1 June 1864: Opened as Ford Green
- 1887–8: renamed Ford Green & Smallthorne
- 11 July 1927: Closed to passenger traffic
- 6 January 1964: Closed to all traffic
Location

Ford Green & Smallthorne railway station is a disused railway station in Stoke-on-Trent, England.

== History ==
The station was opened in 1864 by the North Staffordshire Railway on the company's Biddulph Valley Line. Originally called Ford Green the name was changed in 1887 to Ford Green and Smallthorne. The Biddulph Valley line had opened in 1860 and was primarily concerned with mineral traffic, mostly coal and ironstone from the collieries and ironworks along the Biddulph Valley. Passenger services were of a much lesser interest to the NSR so it was not until a few years later that a number of stations were opened supported by an infrequent number of passenger trains.

Passenger traffic was never intensive and by 1922 all the places along the valley were better served by bus services. Consequently, the London, Midland and Scottish Railway withdrew the passenger services in 1927, although the station continued to be used for excursion trains until the 1960s. Full closure of the station occurred in January 1964.The railway line is now a path and cycleway. To the left it leads to Whitfield Valley.

== Route ==
| Preceding station | Disused railways | Following station |
|---|---|---|
| Black Bull; Line and station closed | North Staffordshire Railway; Biddulph Valley line | Bucknall and Northwood; Line and station closed |
