= Brunswick Wharf =

Former railway goods yard in Cheshire, England

Brunswick Wharf was a railway goods yard in Buglawton, Congleton, in Cheshire, England. It was used to transport sand and coal between Congleton and the Staffordshire Potteries, along the Biddulph Valley Line.

== History ==
Brunswick Wharf was opened by the North Staffordshire Railway (NSR) on 29 August 1860; it was the northern terminus of the Biddulph Valley line. In NSR timetables it was referred to as Congleton Town.

While using the line for most of the journey, goods trains heading to Brunswick Wharf would leave the Biddulph Valley Line at Congleton Lower Junction. Goods trains would then follow a line underneath the North Staffordshire main line, which was used to reach Brunswick Wharf and a goods and mineral yard at Congleton railway station.

Ever Saturday morning, there was a sand train service from Brunswick Wharf to Warrington and St Helens; the sand was used in the Lancashire glass industry.

During the line's heyday, the Robert Heath-owned collieries operated private mineral trains between their various sites to and from Brunswick Wharf.

When trams were being built for Manchester and other local cities, metal was brought to Brunswick Wharf to be moulded down into brake blocks for trams.

The decision to close Brunswick Wharf "baffled" the staff due to how busy and well used it was. The last train left Brunswick Wharf on 1 April 1968, after which it was closed. After its closure, sand had to be brought to Congleton station and coal to Kidsgrove station.

Plans were drawn up by the North Staffordshire Railway Society in the 1970s to reopen Brunswick Wharf, as part of a planned heritage railway to Biddulph station; this was created in order to preserve some of the Biddulph Valley Line. Due to lack of interest from Cheshire County Council and the general public, this plan was abandoned.

== Operation ==
Brunswick Wharf consisted of three sidings called Wharfs, operated by three different companies; these were:

- Robbert Heath and Low Moor
- The Congleton and Industrial & Equitable Co-operative society
- H. Hargreaves & Co. Ltd, coal, coke and lime merchants.

== Staff ==
Below is a list of staff who worked at Brunswick Wharf, with their job titles and/or employer if known:

- Harry Walton.
- Mr Minshull. (Yard Forman)
- John Butler.
- Charles Yates.
- Jack Holland.
- Charlie Butler.
- Frank Emery. (British Rail checker)
- Fred Jackson. (British Rail loader)
- Stan Woodward. (Co-op Yard Forman)
- Joel Boon. (Gillow heath)
- Jack Greenford.
- Billy Smith.
- Ralf Goodwin.
- Bill Willett.
- Will Shaw.
