= Longton Interchange =

Bus station in Staffordshire, England

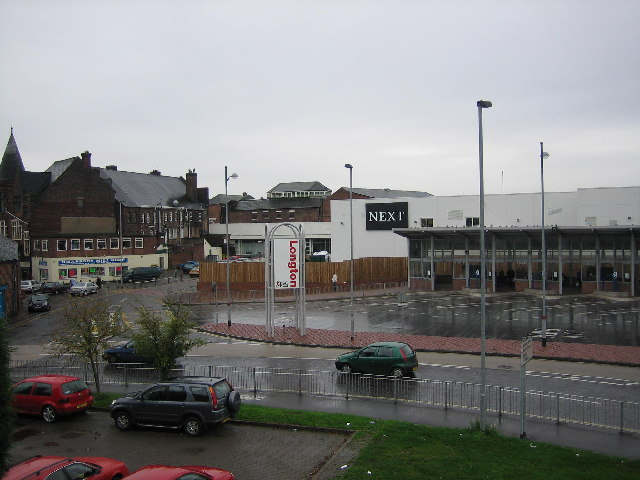

General information
- Location: Baths Road, Longton, Staffordshire; Stoke-on-Trent
- Coordinates: 52.9896°N 2.1379°W
- Bus stands: 9
- Bus operators: First Potteries; Stanton's of Stoke; D&G Bus
- Connections: Longton railway station (adjacent)

History
- Opened: 2003
Location

Longton Transport Interchange serves the town of Longton, Staffordshire, England. The interchange is adjacent to Longton railway station.

The interchange was opened in 2003 at a cost of £637,000. The building was part funded by Stoke-on-Trent City Council, with £140,000 of funding being paid by Tesco. Tesco's contribution was part of the conditions put in place when the council approved planning permission for a supermarket in the town centre.

The main operators at the station are First Potteries, D&G Bus and Stanton's of Stoke. Buses run from the bus station around the Potteries area and as far as Cheadle.
