= North Stafford Hotel =

Hotel in Stoke-on-Trent, England

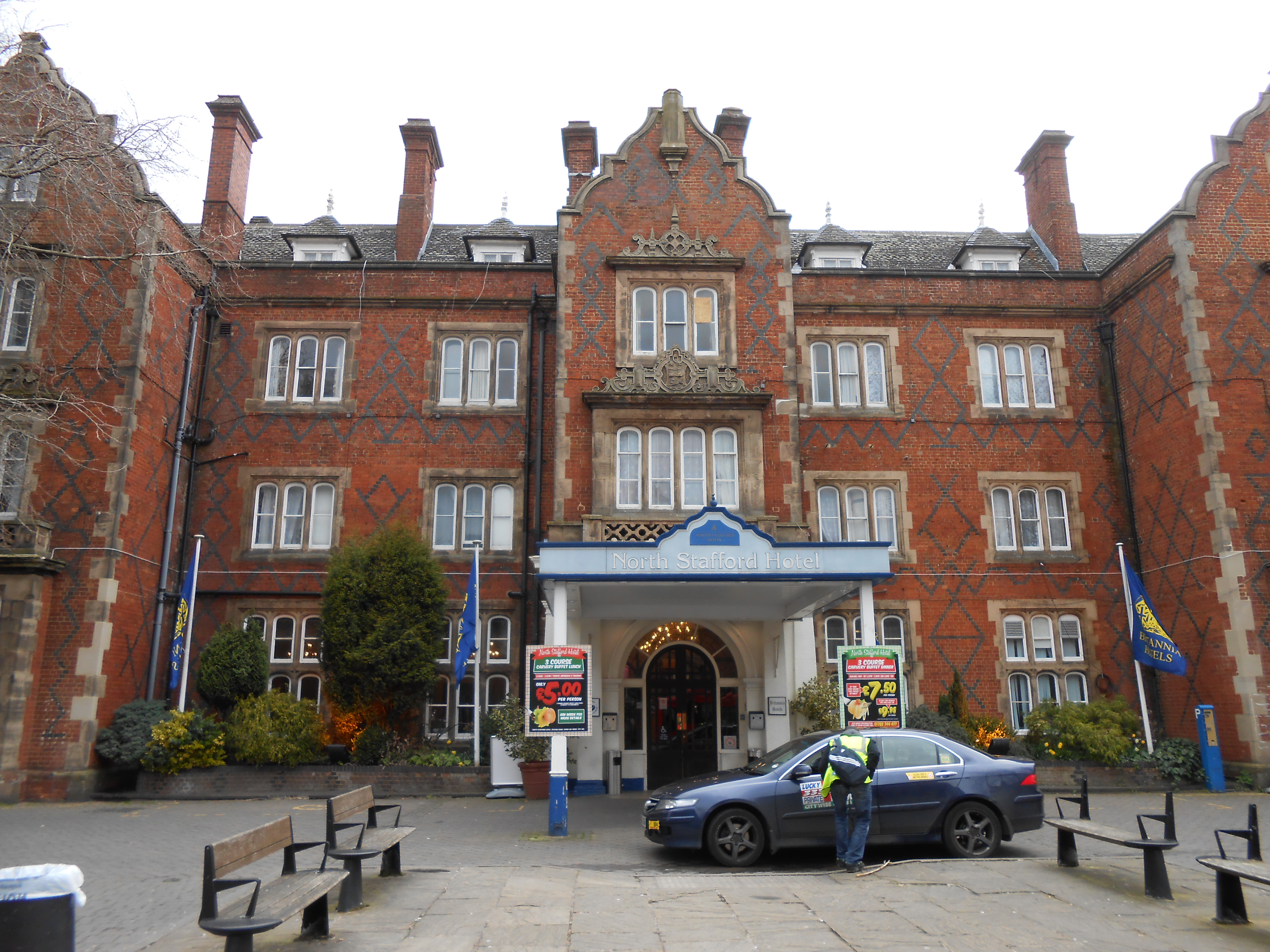
- North Stafford Hotel, Stoke-on-Trent
- Interactive map of the North Stafford Hotel area

General information
- Location: Winton Square, Stoke-on-Trent
- Coordinates: 53.008393°N 2.180184°W
- Opening: 1849
- Operator: Britannia Hotels

Technical details
- Floor count: 3

Design and construction
- Developer: North Staffordshire Railway

Other information
- Number of rooms: 88
- Number of restaurants: 1

Website
- Official website

The North Stafford Hotel is a Grade II* listed hotel in Stoke-on-Trent, Staffordshire, England, opposite the city's railway station, also a Grade II* listed building.

== History and design ==
The hotel was built by John Jay for the North Staffordshire Railway (NSR) in 1849 at a cost of £8,843. The building is three stories high and based on an Elizabethan-style E-shaped plan. The design is similar to that of the station but more subdued; the building was extended in 1878. The building is mainly brick-built, with blue stone diapering and a plain tiled roof and Dutch-style gables above the outer and central bay windows. The central ground floor bay forms a porch. The hotel was built to resemble an Elizabethan manor house. The hotel quickly built an up a good reputation and, within a few years, was regarded as one most important hotels in Staffordshire.

When the County Borough of Stoke on Trent was formed in 1910, incorporating six towns, the hotel was chosen the venue for the inaugural meeting of the local council to avoid showing a bias by using one of the six town halls—a matter of local sensitivity at the time. Subsequent meetings rotated between the town halls before the council decided to permanently locate itself in Stoke.

The NSR preferred to lease the building, with limited success. When the NSR was amalgamated into the London Midland and Scottish Railway (LMS) in 1923, the LMS took over the hotel and found the business in poor condition. When a lease expired in 1931, the LMS took the management of the hotel into its own hands and undertook an extensive refurbishment of the building. The hotel has been expanded several times during its history, including additional buildings to the rear, in order to provide more bedrooms and kitchen space. Not all the extensions were conducted sympathetically to the original architectural style, resulting in a variety of architectural styles to the rear of the building.

The hotel became a listed building in 1972 and is listed in grade II*. It is located on Winton Square, immediately opposite Stoke-on-Trent railway station, and is one of four listed buildings on the square. The station itself is grade II* listed, and a statue of local potter Josiah Wedgwood is grade II listed; a row of railway cottages forms another grade II listed building. Winton Square is described as the UK's only piece of town planning undertaken by railway company specifically to set off a station.

The hotel, by then owned by the nationalised British Rail, was sold in 1953 and today is owned by the Britannia Hotels chain, who acquired it in November 2002; it has 88 bedrooms.
