= Fenton Manor railway station =

Former railway station in England

Fenton Manor
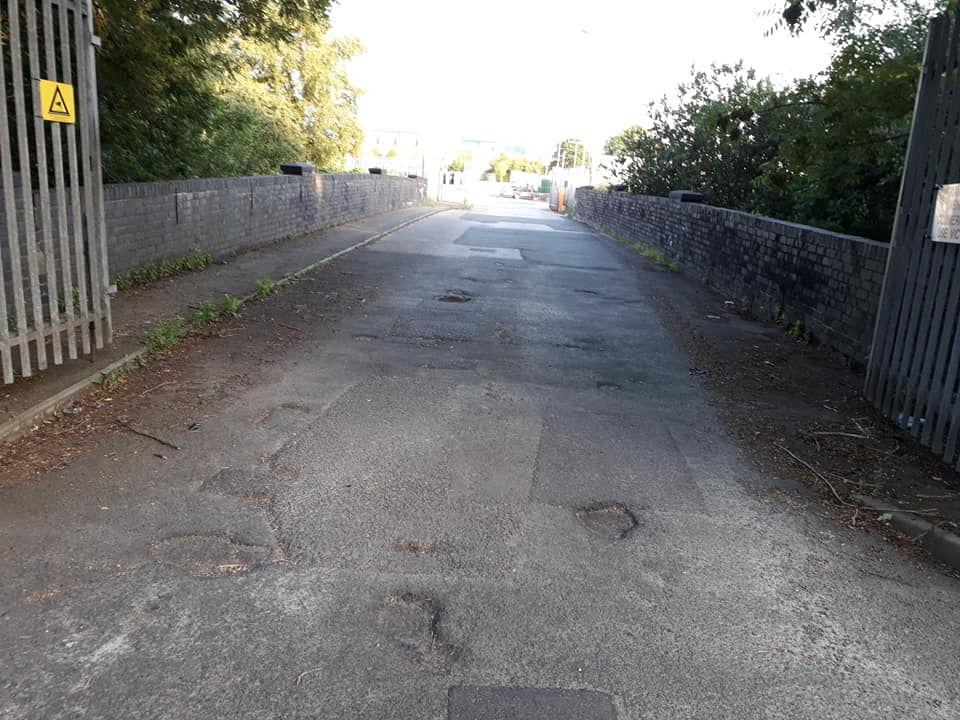
- Access road bridge over the line near Fenton Manor (Currently out of use and overgrown)

General information
- Location: Fenton, Staffordshire, Stoke-on-Trent; England
- Coordinates: 53.0047°N 2.1640°W
- Grid reference: SJ890452
- Platforms: 2

Other information
- Status: Disused

History
- Original company: North Staffordshire Railway
- Post-grouping: London, Midland and Scottish Railway; London Midland Region of British Railways

Key dates
- October 1889: Opened
- 6 May 1956: Closed
Location

Fenton Manor railway station was a station in the Fenton area of Stoke-on-Trent, opened in 1889 by the North Staffordshire Railway on its line to Leek. It was on Victoria Road and was one of two stations in the area, the other being Fenton on the Stoke-Derby Line.

The station closed in 1956. The track is still in situ and the buildings still exist. The platform edges can still be traced.

At the end of the station, towards Leek, is the Fenton Manor Tunnel which is 106 yards (97 m) long.

== Future ==
The station lies on the proposed line to reopen from Stoke to Leekbrook Junction (Moorland City Railway).

Preceding station	Historical railways	Following station
Bucknall and Northwood Line and station closed	North Staffordshire Railway Biddulph Valley line	Stoke-on-Trent Line and station open
