= Fenton railway station =

Former railway station in Staffordshire, England

Fenton
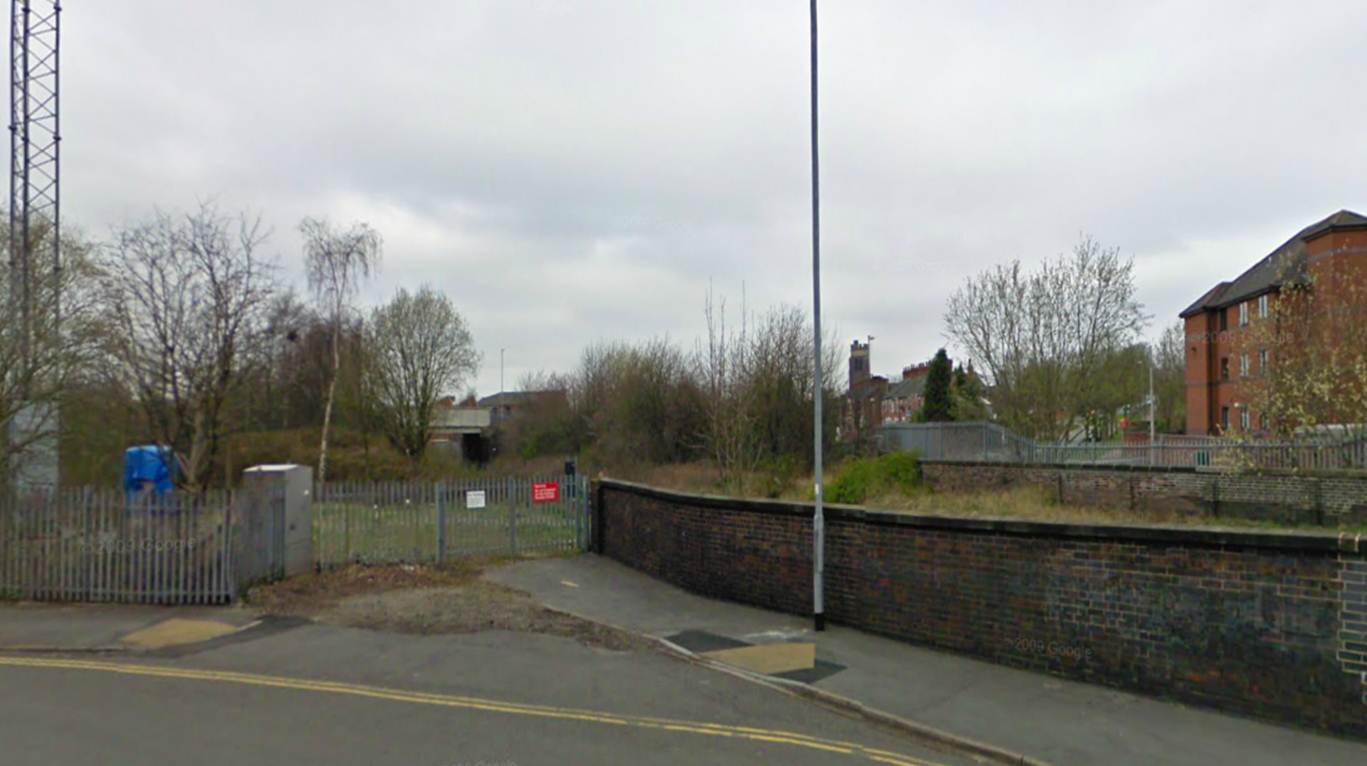

General information
- Location: Fenton, Staffordshire, Stoke-on-Trent; England
- Coordinates: 52.9949°N 2.1626°W
- Grid reference: SJ892441
- Platforms: 2

Other information
- Status: Disused

History
- Original company: North Staffordshire Railway
- Post-grouping: London, Midland and Scottish Railway; London Midland Region of British Railways

Key dates
- 1 August 1864: Opened
- 6 February 1961: Closed
Location

Fenton railway station opened in 1864 on the North Staffordshire Railway line to Derby. It closed in 1961. It was in Heron Cross and was one of two stations in the area, the other being Fenton Manor.

The buildings and platforms have been demolished although the site itself is still identifiable, occupied by a communications mast.

Preceding station	Historical railways	Following station
Stoke-on-Trent Line and station open	North Staffordshire Railway Crewe to Derby Line	Longton Line and station open
