= Northwood, Stoke-on-Trent =

Coordinates: 53.02°N 02.16°W

Northwood
- Location within Staffordshire
- OS grid reference: SJ8948
- Unitary authority: City of Stoke-on-Trent
- Shire county: Staffordshire
- Region: West Midlands
- Country: England
- Sovereign state: United Kingdom
- Post town: Stoke-on-Trent
- Postcode district: ST1
- Police: Staffordshire
- Fire: Staffordshire
- Ambulance: West Midlands
- UK Parliament: Stoke-on-Trent

Northwood is an older residential area of Hanley, Stoke-on-Trent. It is home to Northwood Stadium, the ground of City of Stoke Athletics Club.
