= Longton railway station =

Railway station in Staffordshire, England

Coordinates: 52.990°N 2.137°W

Longton
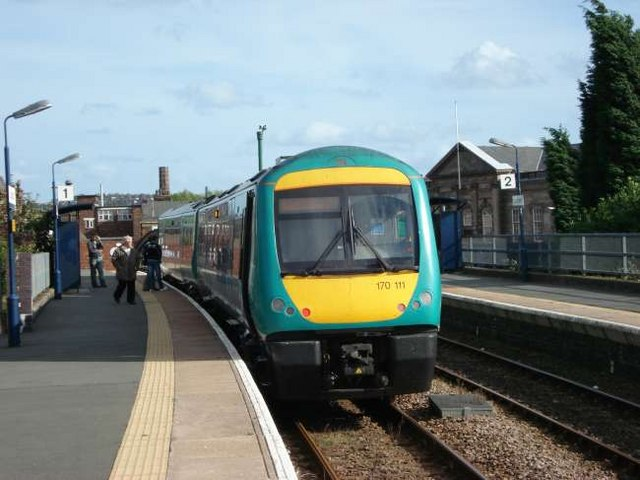
- A Central Trains Class 170 DMU, September 2006

General information
- Location: Longton, Stoke-on-Trent, England
- Grid reference: SJ908436
- Manager: East Midlands Railway
- Platforms: 2

Other information
- Station code: LGN
- Classification: DfT category F2

Key dates
- 7 August 1848: Opened

Passengers
- 2021/22: ▲44,550
- 2022/23: ▲55,318
- 2023/24: ▲64,820
- 2024/25: ▲81,226
- 2025/26: ▲0.103 million
Location
Notes
- Passenger statistics from the Office of Rail and Road

Longton railway station serves the town of Longton, in Stoke-on-Trent, Staffordshire, England. It is served by trains on the Crewe to Derby Line, which is also a community rail line known as the North Staffordshire line. The station is owned by Network Rail and managed by East Midlands Railway, which also operates all services.

== History ==
The station was opened on 7 August 1848 by the North Staffordshire Railway. It is located on an embankment opposite the town hall and next to a cantilever bridge, which is a local landmark. A ticket office is located in a walkway underneath the station but has been locked out of use since the early 1990s.

In 2003 a new bus station was built adjacent to the railway station and named Longton Transport Interchange. Nearby, new commercial premises have been built, including a large Tesco Extra supermarket.

To the west of the station is Foley Crossing signal box.

== Facilities ==
Like most stations on the line, the station is unstaffed and facilities are limited. There is, however, a ticket machine at road level.

There is a small cycle rack at the entrance to the station as well as a chargeable car park.

Step free access is not available to either of the platforms at Longton.

== Services ==
All services at Longton are operated by East Midlands Railway.

On weekdays and Saturdays, the station is generally served by an hourly service westbound to Crewe via Stoke-on-Trent and eastbound to Lincoln via Derby and Nottingham. During the late evenings, services terminate at Nottingham instead of Lincoln.

On Sundays, the station is served by an hourly service between Crewe and Derby only although no trains operate before 14:00.

Preceding station	National Rail	Following station
Stoke-on-Trent	East Midlands Railway Crewe to Derby Line	Blythe Bridge
	Historical railways	
Fenton Line open, station closed	North Staffordshire Railway Crewe to Derby Line	Normacot Line open, station closed
