= Mossley Halt railway station =

Former railway station in Cheshire, England

Mossley Halt

General information
- Location: Congleton, Cheshire East; England
- Grid reference: SJ8830461632
- Line: Biddulph Valley line
- Platforms: 1

Other information
- Status: Disused

History
- Opened: October 1919
- Closed: 13 July 1925
- Original company: North Staffordshire Railway
- Post-grouping: London, Midland and Scottish Railway
Location

Mossley Halt was a railway station in Mossley, near Congleton, in Cheshire, England. It was located about 1.5 miles (2.4 km) south of Congleton railway station, on the Biddulph Valley line.

== History ==
Mossley Halt was opened by the North Staffordshire Railway in 1919. It was used by workers travelling to and from Black Bull coal mine.

In 1923, the Chatterley-Whitfeild collieries ran services to transport their own workers between Mossley Halt, Chell Halt and Biddulph Halt. These services ran twice a day one in the early morning and one a night. These services did not last long.

The London, Midland and Scottish Railway ran two services a day between Mossley Halt and Chell Halt; these trains ran at midday to take the noon shift workers to the collieries and to bring the day shift workers back.

By the time of Grouping in 1923, there was one service on Saturdays that called at Mossley Halt.

Mossley Halt was closed on 13 July 1925.

Preceding station	Disused railways	Following station
Congleton Line and station open	North Staffordshire Railway Biddulph Valley line	Biddulph Line and station closed

== Facilities ==
Mossley Halt had one platform with a waiting shelter, a booking office and a platelayers hut.
