= Black Bull railway station =

Disused railway station in Staffordshire, England

Black Bull
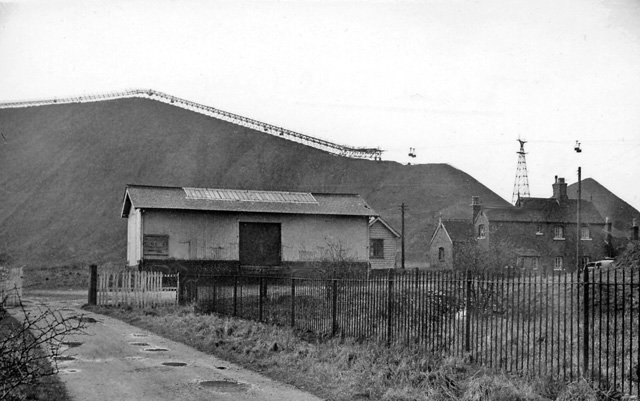
- The remains of station photographed in 1962

General information
- Location: Biddulph, Staffordshire Moorlands; England
- Coordinates: 53.0925°N 2.1833°W
- Grid reference: SJ878550
- Platforms: 2

Other information
- Status: Disused

History
- Original company: North Staffordshire Railway
- Post-grouping: London, Midland and Scottish Railway

Key dates
- 1 June 1864: Opened
- 11 July 1927: Closed to passenger traffic
- 6 January 1964: Closed to all traffic
Location

Black Bull railway station served both the village of Brown Lees and the Stoke-on-Trent suburb of Brindley Ford, in Staffordshire, England.

== History ==
The station was opened in 1864 by the North Staffordshire Railway on the company's Biddulph Valley Line. The line had opened in 1860 and was primarily concerned with mineral traffic, mostly coal and ironstone from the collieries and ironworks along the Biddulph Valley. Passenger services were of a much lesser interest to the NSR so it was not until a few years later that a number of stations were opened supported by an infrequent number of passenger trains.

Passenger traffic was never intensive and, by 1922, all the places along the valley were better served by bus services. Consequently, the London, Midland and Scottish Railway withdrew the passenger services in 1927. Facilities for goods traffic remained until 1964.

Preceding station	Disused railways	Following station
Knypersley Halt; Line and station closed	North Staffordshire Railway; Biddulph Valley line	Chell Halt; Line and station closed
