= Endon railway station =

Disused railway station in England

Endon
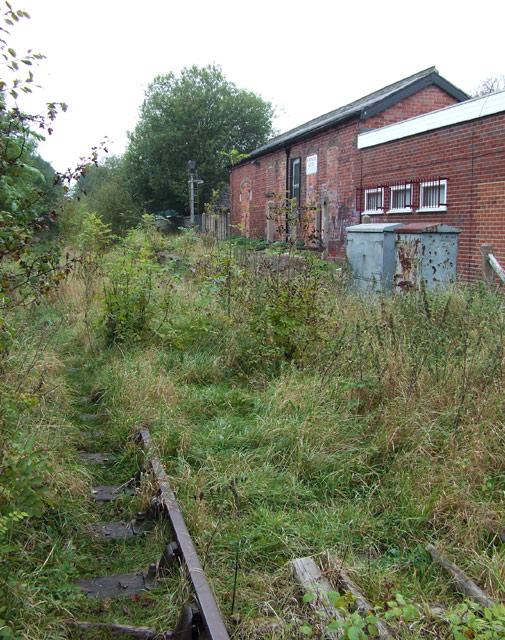
- Disused Endon Station

General information
- Location: Endon and Stanley, Staffordshire Moorlands; England
- Coordinates: 53.0751°N 2.1088°W
- Grid reference: SJ928531
- Platforms: 2

Other information
- Status: Disused

History
- Original company: North Staffordshire Railway
- Post-grouping: London, Midland & Scottish Railway

Key dates
- 1 November 1867: Opened
- 7 May 1956: Closed
Location

Endon railway station is a disused railway station that served the villages of Endon and Stanley in Staffordshire, England.

== History ==
The Stoke–Leek line was opened by the North Staffordshire Railway (NSR) in 1867 and a station to serve the village of Endon was opened in November 1867. Endon marked the end of a single track section of the line from Milton Junction (where the line diverged from the Biddulph Valley line). The station had two platforms and quite extensive good facilities. Running from the station was a private siding that served the factory of Harrison & Son, this siding was unusual in that it crossed the nearby Caldon Canal by means of a swing bridge. Also due to the close location of the station to the canal was a limestone tippler for the transfer of limestone from railway wagons to canal boats. The tippler was authorised in 1904 but not built until 1918–1919 and only remained in use until the late 1920s when the decline in canal traffic led to its closure.

== Closure to passengers ==
Passenger services over the line were withdrawn in 1956 and the station closed to passenger traffic although it continued to be used for excursion trains until 1963. Goods traffic continued until a later date, traffic to Harrison and Son Ltd lasting until 1961. The line through the closed station was singled in 1971 but the platform and some of the station buildings remain in existence. The line through the station continued in use until 1988 for freight services and since 1988 the line has officially been out of use but not closed.

== Present day ==
On 13 January 2015 a tearoom known as the Station Kitchen opened in the Endon station building.

| Preceding station | Disused railways | Following station |
|---|---|---|
| Stockton Brook; Line disused, station closed | North Staffordshire Railway; Stoke–Leek line | Wall Grange; Line disused, station closed |
