= Hanley bus station =

Bus station in Stoke-on-Trent, Staffordshire, England

Coordinates: 53.022390°N 2.174400°W

Hanley bus station is a bus station in Hanley, Stoke-on-Trent.

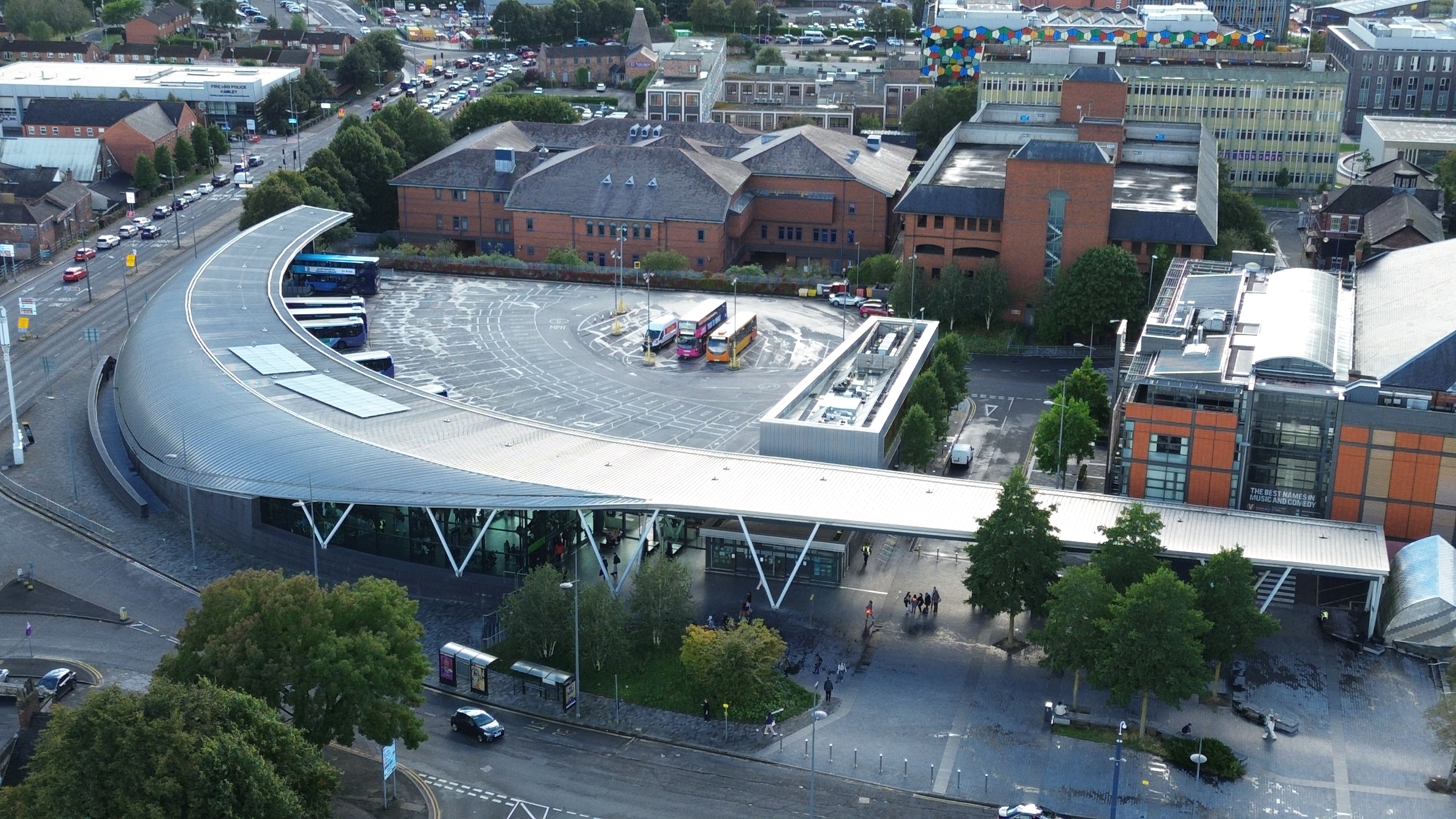
Aerial view of station

== History ==
Hanley bus station was constructed in the 1970s. The current bus station was built at a cost of £15 million on the site of the John Street car park, across the road from the original bus station. Following two years of construction, it opened on 26 March 2013.

== Future ==
The bus station is set to be refurbished in a £1.4 million project, which will see a new vehicular entrance created.

== Design ==
The building was designed by Grimshaw Architects and has a curved aluminium-clad roof. The bus station has 22 stances.
