= Congleton railway station =

Railway station in Cheshire, England

Coordinates: 53.158°N 2.193°W

Congleton
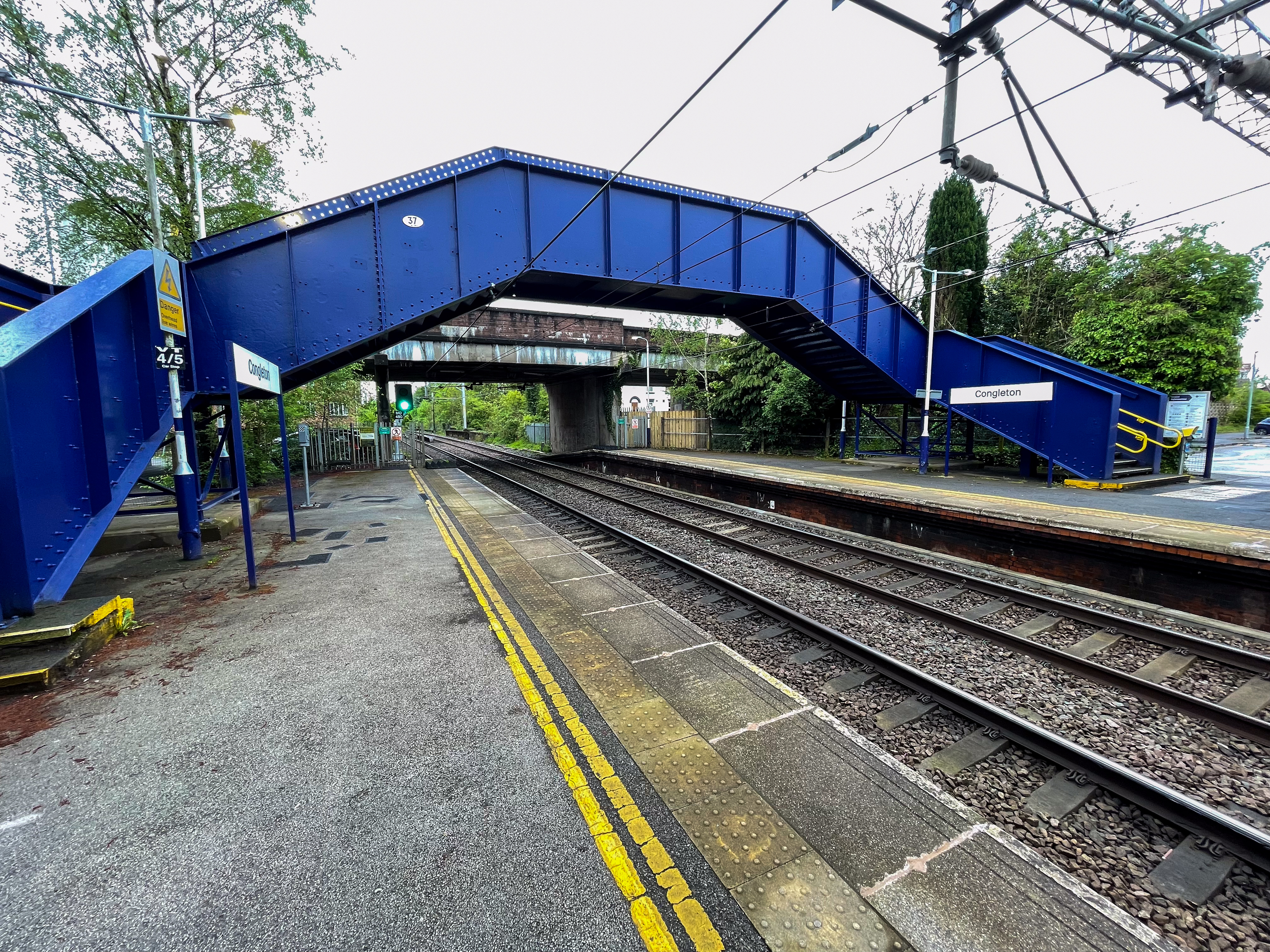
- Congleton station in 2023

General information
- Location: Congleton, Cheshire East, England
- Grid reference: SJ872623
- Owner: Network Rail
- Manager: Northern Trains
- Line: Stafford-Manchester
- Platforms: Formerly 3, 2 in use
- Train operators: Northern Trains

Construction
- Architectural style: Pseudo-Tudor (when built), Utilitarian (rebuild)

Other information
- Station code: CNG
- Classification: DfT category E

History
- Opened: 9 October 1848; 178 years ago
- Rebuilt: 1966; 60 years ago
- Electrified: 1967; 59 years ago
- Original company: North Staffordshire Railway
- Post-grouping: London, Midland and Scottish Railway

Key dates
- 1870: Signal box built
- 1 June 1864: Biddulph Valley Line passenger services commenced
- 1892: Footbridge erected
- 11 July 1927: Biddulph Valley Line passenger services withdrawn
- 1930: Third platform added
- 1976: Closed to goods
- 2004: Refurbished
- December 2008: Hourly service Monday-Saturday introduced
- 2018: Booking hall refurbished
- 6 July 2020: CrossCountry services suspended
- 2021: Footbridge refurbished

Passengers
- 2021/22: ▲0.219 million
- 2022/23: ▲0.256 million
- 2023/24: ▲0.299 million
- 2024/25: ▲0.324 million
- 2025/26: ▲0.326 million
Location
Notes
- Passenger statistics from the Office of Rail and Road

Congleton railway station serves the market town of Congleton, in Cheshire, England. It lies on the Stafford-Manchester branch of the West Coast Main Line.

== History ==
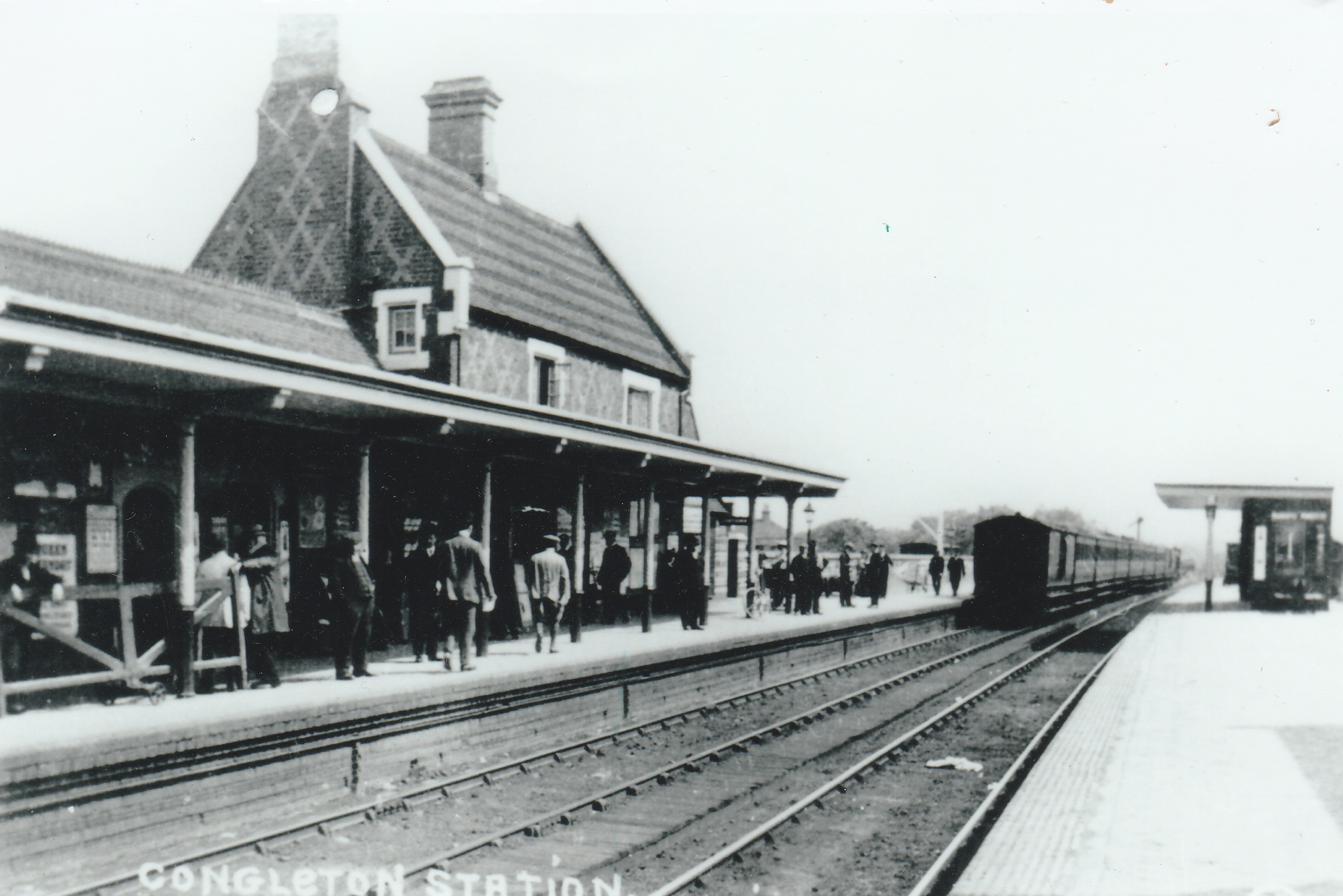
Congleton station, c1900

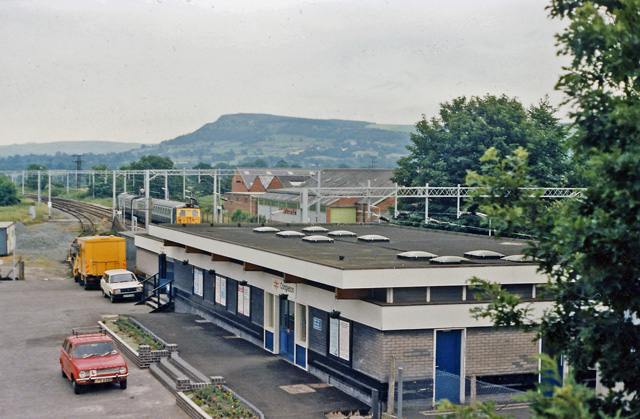
The station in 1986

Plans for a railway station in the town were first announced by the North Staffordshire Railway (NSR) on 30 April 1845. Congleton was to be the terminus of a planned line to Colwich, via Burslem and Stoke-on-Trent; this route was to be called the Pottery Line.

The Stafford-Manchester line from Stoke-on-Trent to Congleton was opened on 9 October 1848 by the NSR; the station opened on the same day. There was only one sets of lines that had been built between Congleton and Harecastle; this meant that approaching trains had to receive a signal from the station master before entering. Some NSR through trains used the Potteries Loop Line.

The NSR ran a limited number of passenger trains on Monday-Saturday between Congleton and Uttoxeter, calling at stations on the Potteries Loop line. (Note: Extract from public timetable, July to September 1899)

Congleton was the terminus for two routes:

- London, Midland and Scottish Railway passenger trains on the northern end of the Potteries Loop Line between Tunstall and Stoke-on-Trent.
- Biddulph Valley line passenger services were withdrawn on 11 July 1927. Despite this, the London Midland and Scottish Railway ran special services along it at the beginning of August each year.

In 1930, a third platform was added by the Nestle's Anglo Condensed Milk Company due to the importance of milk to the town's economy.

The station buildings were demolished and rebuilt in 1966, as part of the modernisation and electrification programme of the West Coast Main Line; the signal box and level crossing were also removed.

After the closure of the goods yard at Brunswick Wharf in Buglawton on 1 April 1968, sand was delivered by train to the station instead.

Under British Rail, Congleton was served by many special services from Stoke-on-Trent via the Potteries Loop Line. In 1972, the Royal Train stopped at Congleton as part of a visit to the town by Queen Elizabeth II and Prince Philip.

In 1976, the station was closed to goods services.

It was one of the boundary stations for the short-lived Network NorthWest sector of British Rail.

The station has, in the past, been subjected to vandalism.

On 3 December 2025, a petition was submitted to the House of Commons to improve Sunday services at Congleton.

Between December 2024 & November 2026 rail services were replaced by buses.

=== Former services ===
The station was previously served by the following:

- Direct trains to London Euston until 1996.
- Virgin CrossCountry served the station on Monday-Saturday in the early days of privatisation.
- Limited peak-hour services operated by CrossCountry between Manchester Piccadilly, Birmingham New Street and Bournemouth stopped here until 6 June 2020.

=== Accidents and incidents ===
- On 27 December 1864, there was a collision between a London and North Western Railway goods engine and van with an NSR passenger train at Congleton junction, where the Biddulph Valley line joined the Stafford-Manchester line.
- On 17 February 1899, there was a collision of two trains.
- On 19 January 2006, a Virgin CrossCountry Voyager train caught fire at the station.

== Facilities ==
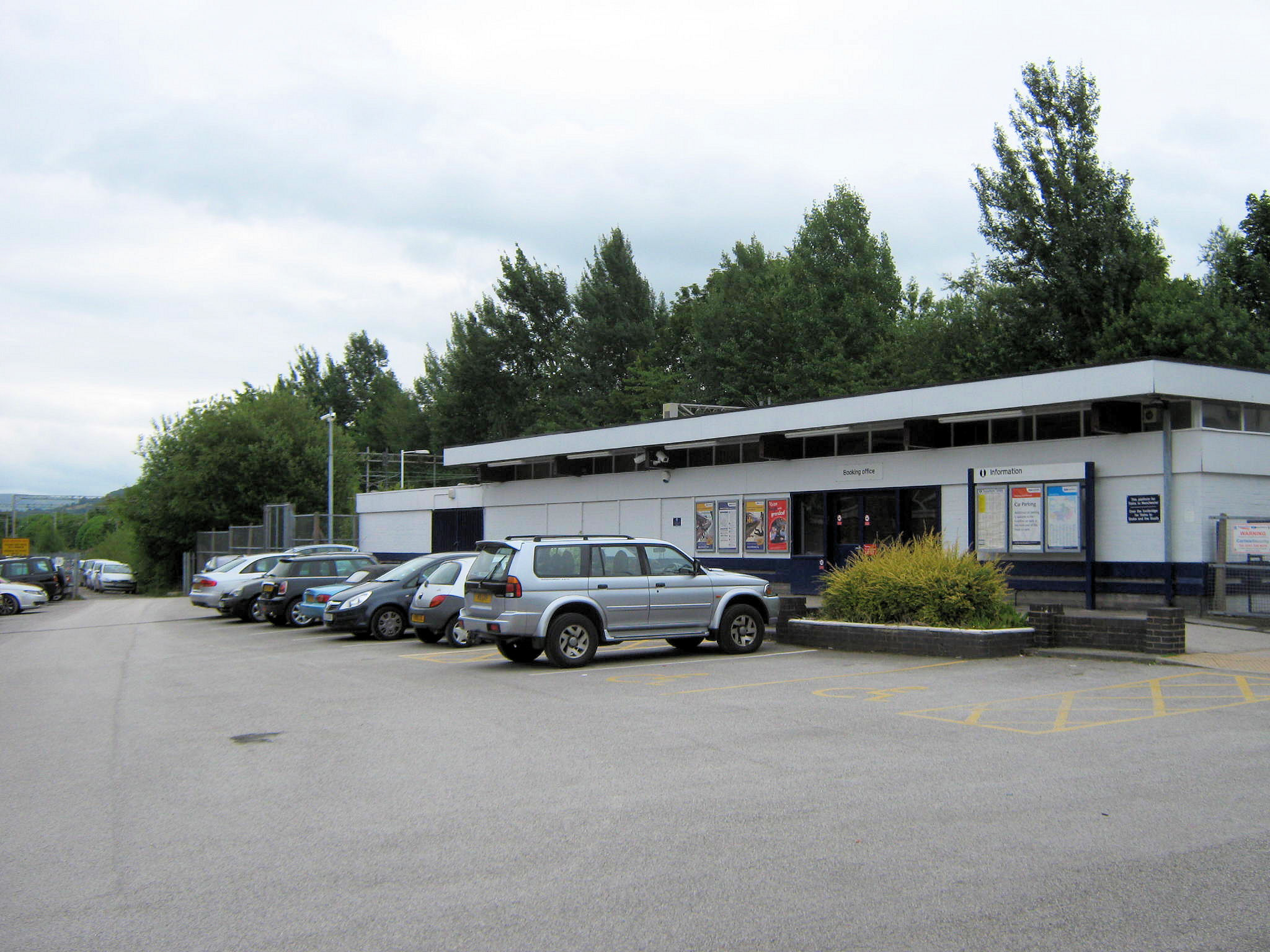
The entrance to the station in 2010

The station has a staffed ticket office which is open on weekdays and Saturday mornings, with self-service ticket machines and help points on both platforms. There is a car park and bicycle storage available. Step-free access is available to both of the platforms.

There is a waiting room on the southbound platform; however, this is boarded up and closed to the public.

As part of the Congleton Transport Development Plan, Cheshire East Council has proposed improving the quality of the station buildings, and the cycling and parking facilities; the idea of a park and ride service has also been raised.

== Services ==
Northern Trains operates hourly services in each direction between Stoke-on-Trent, Macclesfield, Stockport and Manchester Piccadilly.

On Sundays, there is a temporary reduced service of five trains in each direction throughout the day, this is planned to be restored to six services in 2027.

Grand Central is applying for permission to operate a limited number of services between Manchester Piccadilly and London St Pancras, these services are planned to start in 2029 and are planned to call at Congleton.

Preceding station	National Rail	Following station
Kidsgrove	Northern Trains Stoke to Manchester Line	Macclesfield
	Proposed services	
Stoke-on-Trent	Grand Central Manchester Piccadilly to London ST Pancras (limited service)	Macclesfield
	Previous services	
Stoke-on-Trent	CrossCountry Cross Country Route (Monday–Saturday peak hours only)	Stockport
Preceding station	Historical railways	Following station
North Rode Line open, station closed	North Staffordshire Railway Stafford–Manchester line	Mow Cop and Scholar Green Line open, station closed
Preceding station	Disused railways	Following station
Terminus	North Staffordshire Railway Biddulph Valley line	Mossley Halt Line and station closed
Macclesfield Central Line and station open	North Staffordshire Railway Potteries Loop Line (through trains only)	Mow Cop and Scholar Green Line and station closed
Terminus	North Staffordshire Railway Potteries Loop Line (Monday–Saturday limited service only)	Mow Cop and Scholar Green Line and station closed
Terminus	London, Midland and Scottish Railway Potteries Loop Line	Mow Cop and Scholar Green Line and station closed
Terminus	London, Midland and Scottish Railway Biddulph Valley line	Biddulph Line and station closed

== Best-kept station ==
Congleton has often been recognised as one of the best-kept stations on the Stoke to Manchester line; it was maintained by Congleton in Bloom.

It won the Best Kept Station award in the Stoke-on-Trent division in 1983 and 1984.
