= Stoke–Leek line =

Railway line in Staffordshire, England

Map

The Stoke to Leek line is a mothballed railway route, which up until 1988 was used by BR freight trains to reach the quarries at both Cauldon Lowe and Oakamoor.

The line is made up of two sections; The first section is the remains of the former Biddulph Valley Line, which used to run from Stoke-on-Trent to Congleton, with the section from Stoke to Milton Junction being intact. This used to be a double track section, but was rationalised to single track after the loss of the passenger services.

The second section is the former single track connecting line to Leek from Milton Junction, passing through the villages of Milton, Stockton Brook and Endon before meeting the Churnet Valley Line at Leek Brook Junction for the 1 mile run into Leek. The section from Endon to Leek Brook though used to be double-tracked but was singled at the same time as the first section.

Both of these lines were part of the North Staffordshire Railway network that was constructed in the second half of the 19th century. The Biddulph Valley line was authorised on 24 July 1854, with passenger services commencing in 1864. The Milton to Leek was authorised during 1863, with the passenger and goods service commencing on 1 November 1867.

== Possible re-opening ==
In March 2020, a bid was made to the Restoring Your Railway fund to get funds for a feasibility study into reinstating the line between Stoke and Leek. This bid was unsuccessful.

In March 2021 a new bid was made to the restoring your railways fund to re-open the line. On 27 October 2021 it was announced the bid was successful and that £50,000 had been granted for a feasibility study.

On 4 October 2023, the government committed to reopening the line as part of its Network North scheme.
