= Alsager Road railway station =

Disused railway station in Staffordshire, England

Alsager Road

General information
- Location: Alsager, Cheshire East; England
- Coordinates: 53.0932°N 2.2904°W
- Grid reference: SJ806551
- Platforms: ?

Other information
- Status: Disused

History
- Original company: North Staffordshire Railway
- Post-grouping: London Midland and Scottish Railway

Key dates
- 1 July 1889: Station opens as Talke and Alsager Road
- 1 November 1902: Station renamed Alsager Road
- 27 April 1931: Station closes
Location

Alsager Road railway station was a station on the North Staffordshire Railway, which operated in the West Midlands county of Staffordshire, in England. The station was located on the outskirts of Alsager.

== History ==
The station was opened by the North Staffordshire Railway, then joined the London Midland and Scottish Railway during the Grouping of 1923. That company then closed it eight years later.

== The site today ==
Today the site is sheltered by a row of trees, on the edge of a small industrial area, near the Crewe to Derby Line. It lies to the south east of Alsager railway station.

Preceding station	Historical railways	Following station
Kidsgrove	London Midland and Scottish Railway; North Staffordshire Railway	Audley
