= Audley and Bignall End railway station =

Disused railway station in Staffordshire, England

Audley and Bignall End
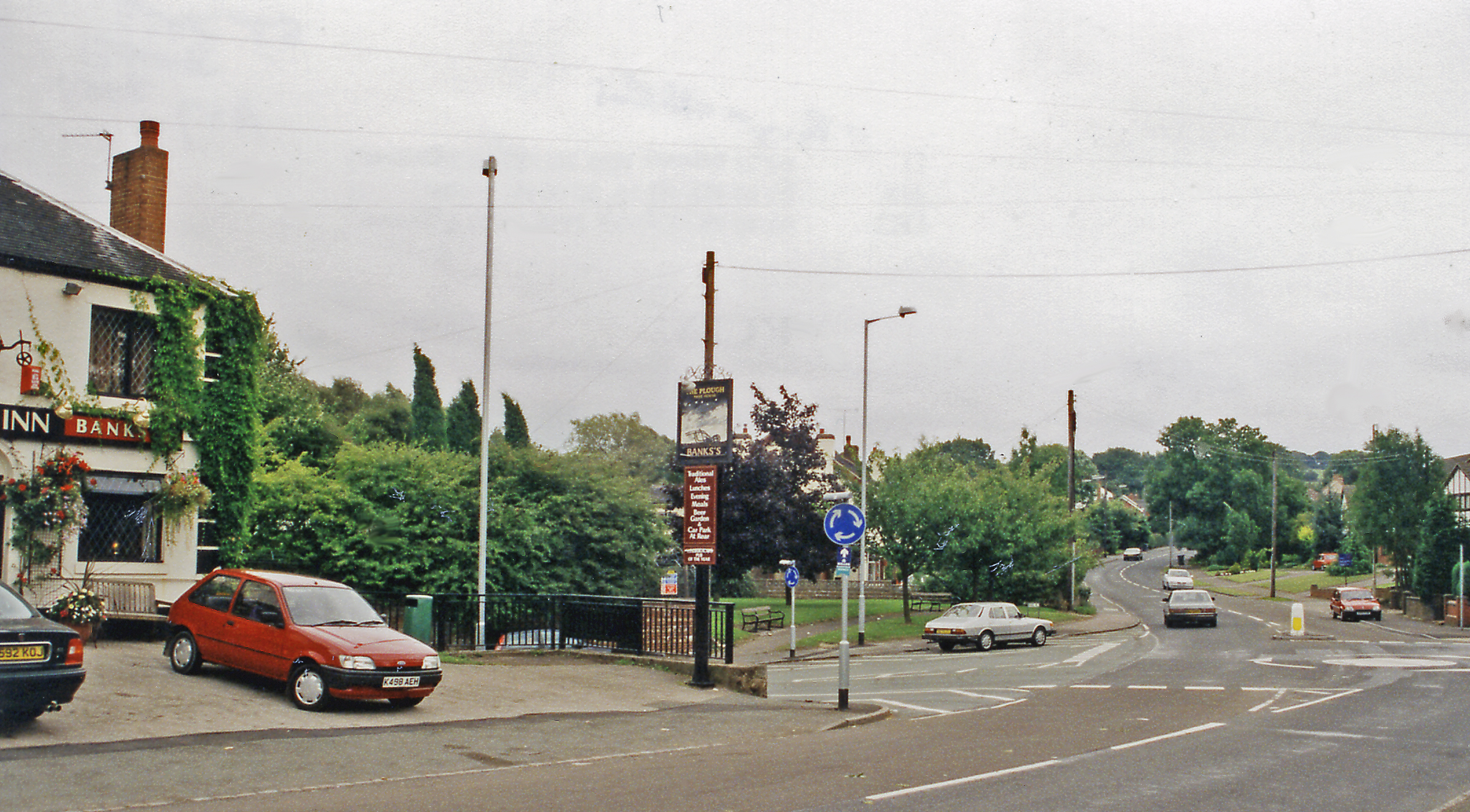
- Location of the former station (1999)

General information
- Location: Bignall End, Newcastle-under-Lyme; England
- Coordinates: 53.0563°N 2.2838°W
- Grid reference: SJ810510

Other information
- Status: Disused

History
- Original company: North Staffordshire Railway
- Post-grouping: London Midland and Scottish Railway

Key dates
- 28 June 1880: Station opens as Audley
- 9 June 1923: Station renamed Audley and Bignall End
- 27 April 1931: Station closes
Location

Audley and Bignall End railway station was a station on the North Staffordshire Railway, which operated in the West Midlands county of Staffordshire, in England.

== History ==
The station was opened by the North Staffordshire Railway, then joined the London Midland and Scottish Railway during the Grouping of 1923. That company then closed it eight years later.

== The site today ==
Preceding station	Historical railways	Following station
Halmerend	North Staffordshire Railway	Alsager Road
