= Chatterley railway station =

Former railway station in Staffordshire, England

Chatterley
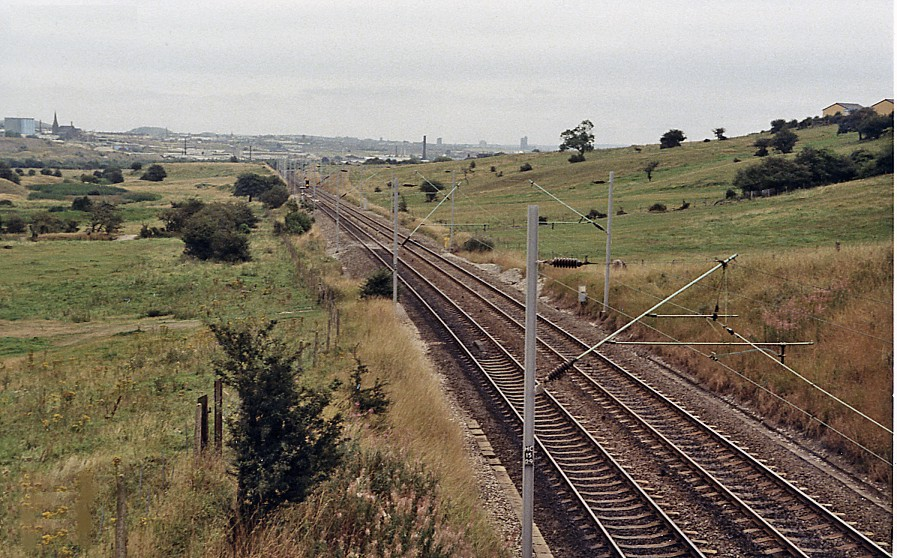
- The site of the station in August 1983

General information
- Location: Stoke-on-Trent, Staffordshire; England
- Coordinates: 53.0635°N 2.2275°W
- Grid reference: SJ850520
- Platforms: 2

Other information
- Status: Disused

History
- Original company: North Staffordshire Railway
- Post-grouping: London, Midland & Scottish Railway

Key dates
- January 1864: Opened as Tunstall
- 1873: Renamed Chatterley
- 27 September 1948: Closed
Location

Chatterley railway station is a former railway station in Staffordshire, England.

Situated in the main North Staffordshire Railway (NSR) between Stoke-on-Trent and Macclesfield a station was opened in 1864 to serve the nearby town of Tunstall and was named Tunstall. In 1873 the NSR opened the Potteries Loop Line which went much closer to Tunstall town centre. A new station called Tunstall was built on the Potteries Loop Line and the existing station renamed Chatterley. For some years the station was referred to in timetables as Chatterley for Tunstall.

The station closed in September 1948 and although the line between Stoke and Macclesfield still exists, the station site is no longer on the route as the line was diverted during the electrification of the West Coast Main Line as the Harecastle railway tunnels were not large enough to accommodate the overhead wires.

| Preceding station | Historical railways | Following station |
|---|---|---|
| Longport; Line and station open | North Staffordshire Railway; Stafford to Manchester Line | Harecastle; Line and station open |
