= Longport railway station =

Railway station in Staffordshire, England

Coordinates: 53.042°N 2.216°W

Longport
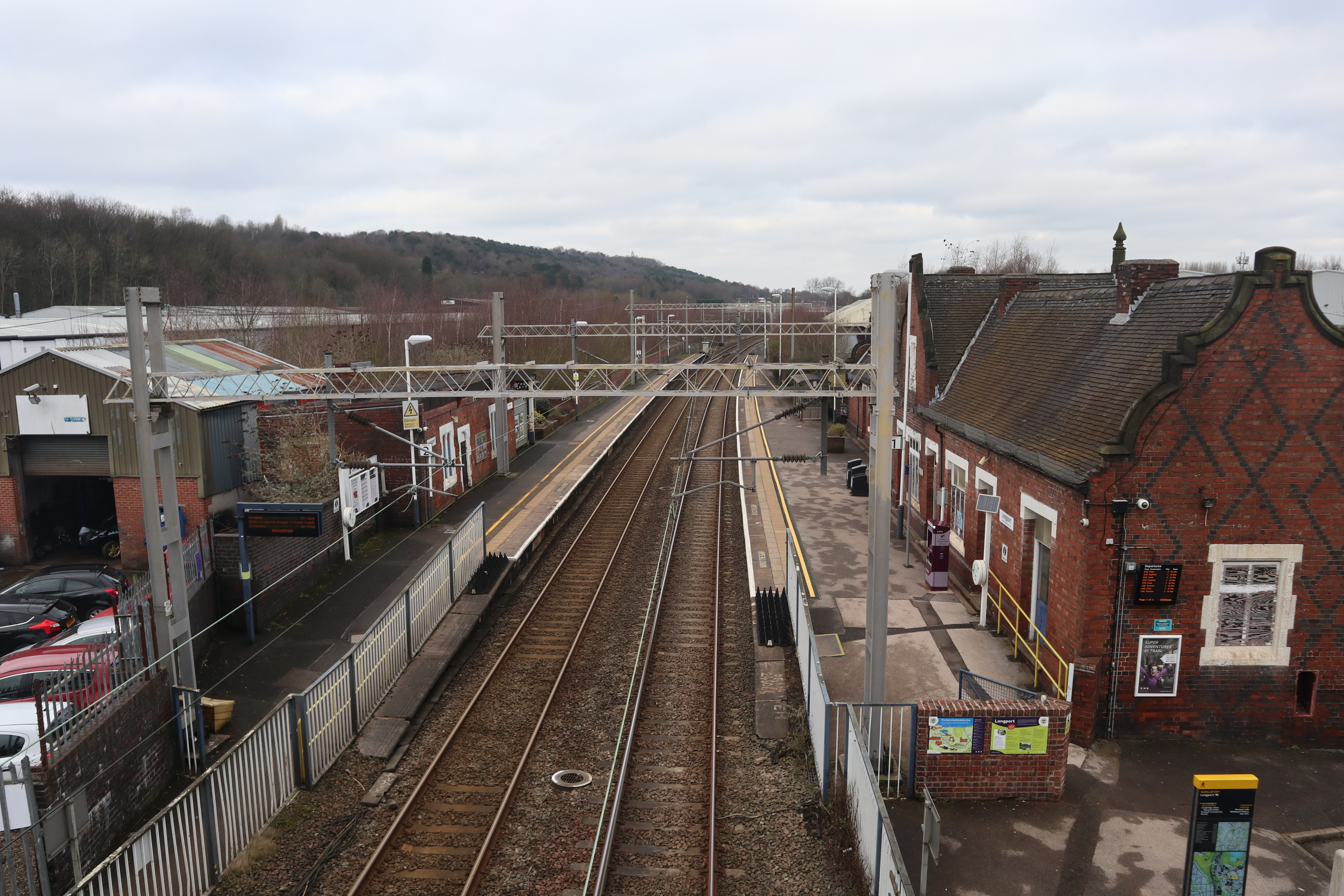

General information
- Location: Longport, Stoke-On-Trent; England
- Grid reference: SJ855494
- Manager: East Midlands Railway
- Platforms: 2

Other information
- Station code: LPT
- Classification: DfT category F2

Key dates
- 9 October 1848: Opened

Passengers
- 2021/22: ▲43,094
- 2022/23: ▲58,048
- 2023/24: ▲76,276
- 2024/25: ▲79,242
- 2025/26: ▼78,742
Location
Notes
- Passenger statistics from the Office of Rail and Road

Longport railway station serves the areas of Longport, Middleport, Tunstall and Burslem, all districts in the northern part of Stoke-on-Trent, England. The station is served by trains on the Crewe–Derby line, which is also a community rail line known as the North Staffordshire line. The station also has two trains a day on the Stoke-on-Trent to Manchester Piccadilly line. The station is owned by Network Rail and managed by East Midlands Railway.

== History ==
The station was opened by the North Staffordshire Railway (NSR) on 9 October 1848 and was named Burslem. It was renamed to Longport when a new Burslem station opened, which was much nearer to the town, after the NSR built their Loop Line.

Until 2003, Longport, along with Etruria, were request stops on Central Trains services running from the station.

== Location and facilities ==
Longport is currently unstaffed. The station has 2 platforms, both of which are wheelchair accessible although the footbridge is not.

The station is adjacent to Longbridge Hayes industrial estate and the A500 road; as such, it sees a number of park and ride commuters. Longport station has its own bus stop which is served by routes 94, 98 and 99; these serve the nearby town of Newcastle-under-Lyme, for which Longport is the closest station.

This station is also the closest to Port Vale F.C.

Longport has cycle parking facilities, with a waiting shelter and real-time information displays on each platform.

The former station buildings have been sold into private ownership and have now been converted into a Hindu wedding venue.

== Services ==
Services at Longport are operated by London Northwestern Railway, East Midlands Railway and Northern Trains.

The station is served by an hourly London Northwestern Railway service between Crewe and Stafford via Stoke-on-Trent, operated using Class 350 EMUs.

On Mondays to Saturdays only, the station is also served by two morning trains per day to Manchester Piccadilly. These services are operated by Northern Trains.

East Midlands Railway operate a limited service at the station on weekdays and Saturdays between Crewe and Lincoln via Derby and Nottingham. The station is served by one train per day to Crewe and two trains per day to Nottingham (3 on Saturdays), of which one continues to Lincoln

On Sundays, London Northwestern Railway operate all services at the station, with an hourly service between Crewe and Stafford operating from 9am until 9pm towards Stafford and from 10am until around 10pm towards Crewe. No East Midlands Railway or Northern Trains services call at the station on Sundays.

Avanti West Coast and CrossCountry services pass through the station but do not stop.

Preceding station	National Rail	Following station
Kidsgrove towards Crewe	London Northwestern Railway Stafford–Crewe	Stoke-on-Trent towards Stafford
Stoke-on-Trent	East Midlands Railway: Crewe to Derby Line; Peak Hours Mondays to Saturdays only	Kidsgrove
Stoke-on-Trent	Northern Trains: Stafford to Manchester Line; Peak Hours Mondays to Saturdays only	Kidsgrove
	Historical railways	
Chatterley Line diverted, station closed	North Staffordshire Railway Crewe to Derby Line	Etruria Line open, station closed
Chatterley Line diverted, station closed	North Staffordshire Railway Stafford to Manchester Line	Etruria Line open, station closed
Chatterley Line diverted, station closed	North Staffordshire Railway Sandbach to Stoke Line	Etruria Line open, station closed
