= Tutbury and Hatton railway station =

Railway station in Derbyshire, England

Coordinates: 52.864°N 1.682°W

Tutbury and Hatton
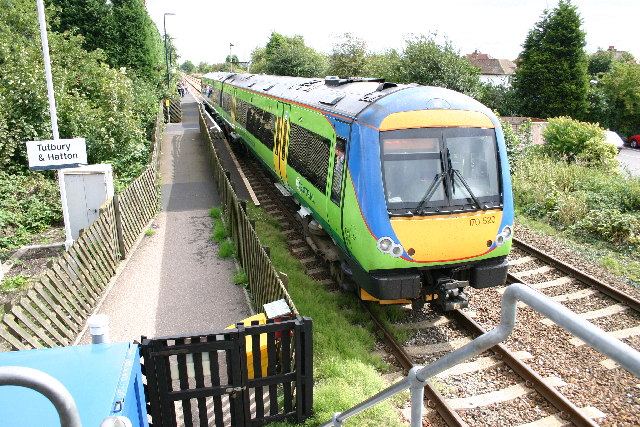
- A Central Trains Class 170 DMU arriving at the station, bound for Skegness (2005)

General information
- Location: Hatton, South Derbyshire; England
- Grid reference: SK215296
- Managed by: East Midlands Railway
- Platforms: 2

Other information
- Station code: TUT
- Classification: DfT category F2

Key dates
- 11 September 1848: Opened as Tutbury
- 7 November 1966: Closed
- 3 April 1989: Reopened as Tutbury and Hatton

Passengers
- 2020/21: ▼15,546
- 2021/22: ▲45,232
- 2022/23: ▲56,556
- 2023/24: ▲66,038
- 2024/25: ▲89,778
Location
Notes
- Passenger statistics from the Office of Rail and Road

Tutbury and Hatton Station is a railway station in England, served by trains on the Crewe to Derby Line, which is a Community Rail line known as the North Staffordshire line. The station is owned by Network Rail and managed by East Midlands Railway.

== History ==
The original station, called simply Tutbury, was opened on 11 September 1848 by the North Staffordshire Railway. This station closed to passengers on 7 November 1966.

Nestlé have a historical presence in the village of Hatton due to the surrounding farmland, which supported a strong dairy farming industry. Nestlé's factory is labelled by the company as their Tutbury factory. Until the late 1970s the factory had its own private siding, which gave access to milk trains from the station.

The present station was opened in 1989 and serves the villages of Tutbury in Staffordshire, and Hatton in Derbyshire.

== Facilities ==
The station is formed of two platforms which are staggered either side of the level crossing, supervised by a signal box at the station.

The station is unstaffed and facilities are limited. There is a shelter on each platform as well as modern help points and bicycle storage. The station has ticket machines; a ticket must be purchased in advance of boarding as the station is now within EMR's penalty fare zone.

Step-free access is available to both the platforms at the station.

== Services ==
All services at Tutbury and Hatton are operated by East Midlands Railway.

On weekdays and Saturdays, the station is generally served by an hourly service westbound to Crewe via Stoke-on-Trent and eastbound to Lincoln via Derby and Nottingham. During the late evenings, services terminate at Nottingham instead of Lincoln.

On Sundays, the station is served by an hourly service between Crewe and Derby only although no trains operate before 14:00.

Preceding station	National Rail	Following station
Uttoxeter	East Midlands Railway Crewe to Derby Line	Derby
Uttoxeter	East Midlands Railway Crewe to Derby Line	Peartree Limited Service
	Historical railways	
Scropton Line open, station closed	North Staffordshire Railway Crewe to Derby Line	Egginton Junction Line open, station closed
Scropton Line open, station closed	North Staffordshire Railway Derbyshire and Staffordshire extension	Rolleston-on-Dove Line and station closed
