= Longport, Staffordshire =

Coordinates: 53.0463°N 2.2128°W

Longport
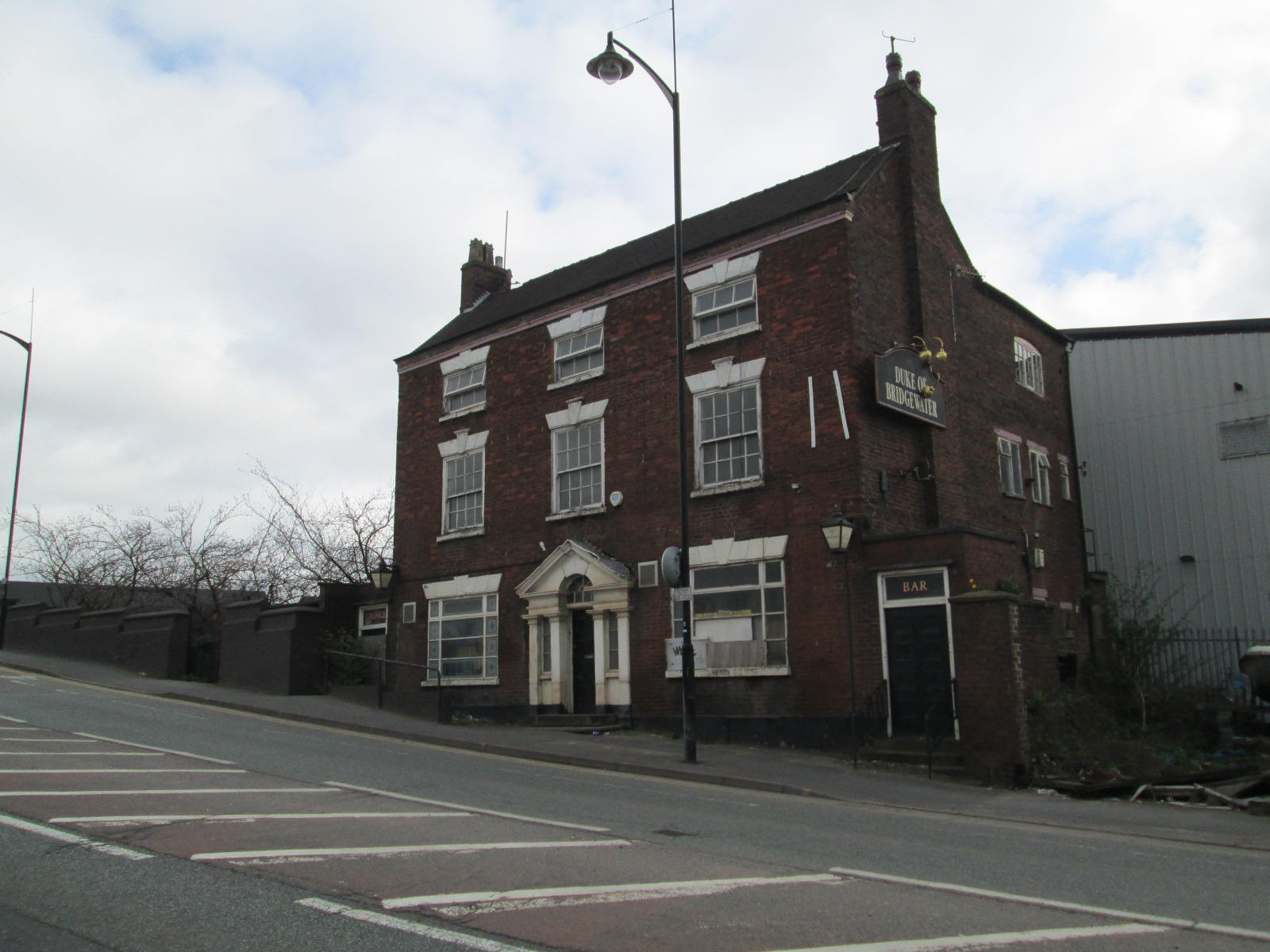
- The Duke of Bridgewater pub, formerly the master potter's house of Davenport's Pottery

- Location within Staffordshire
- OS grid reference: SJ858499
- Unitary authority: Stoke-on-Trent
- Ceremonial county: Staffordshire
- Region: West Midlands
- Country: England
- Sovereign state: United Kingdom
- Post town: Stoke-on-Trent
- Postcode district: ST6
- Dialling code: 01782
- Police: Staffordshire
- Fire: Staffordshire
- Ambulance: West Midlands
- UK Parliament: Stoke-on-Trent North

Longport is an area of Stoke-on-Trent, England. It is the location for Longbridge Hayes industrial estate.

Port Vale F.C. played their home games at The Meadows in Limekiln Lane between 1876 and 1881.

== History ==
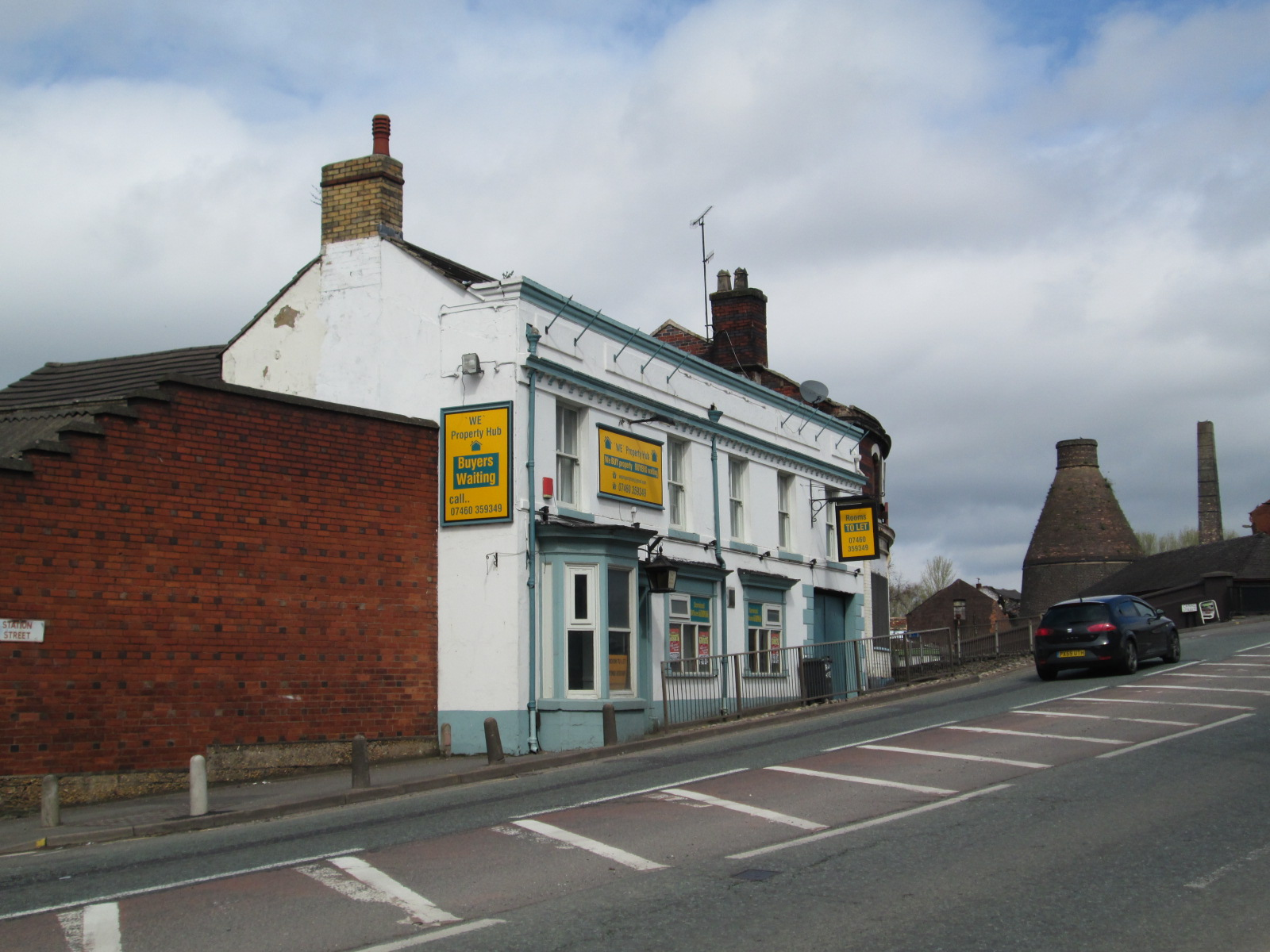
The former Pack Horse Inn

There were few houses in the area before the completion of the canal. The highway from Burslem to Newcastle passed over a footbridge of planks along the side of a brook, so the area had the name Longbridge. An ancient stone cross once stood at Trubshaw Cross, at the northern end of Longport (now a roundabout at the junction of Newcastle Street and Davenport Street).

In 1777, the Trent and Mersey Canal was completed and the area acquired the name Longport. The canal was engineered by Hugh Henshall, taking over from his brother-in-law James Brindley after his death in 1772. Henshall managed the main wharf at Longport, on the opening of the canal, and built the Pack Horse Inn in around 1780, which provided accommodation for boatmen and their horses.

=== Pottery works ===
John Brindley, younger brother of James Brindley, established the first pottery factory here in 1773 and other businessmen built pottery factories soon afterwards. John Davenport acquired John Brindley's factory in 1794, and other pottery factories, and the works were enlarged.

In the early 19th century, houses were built for pottery workers. Longport railway station was opened in 1848. In 1858, a new canal bridge was built and the road was widened, and further houses were built.

John Davenport's son William became head of the pottery company in the mid-19th century. His home was Longport Hall, originally built in the 1770s; it was immediately south of Trubshaw Cross. The building was demolished in the 1880s.

Davenport's Top Bridge Pottery later became Price & Kensington. The master potter's house of Davenport's Bottom Bridge Pottery later became the Duke of Bridgewater pub, named after Francis Egerton, 3rd Duke of Bridgewater, for whom canals were constructed by James Brindley.

==== Partial demolition ====
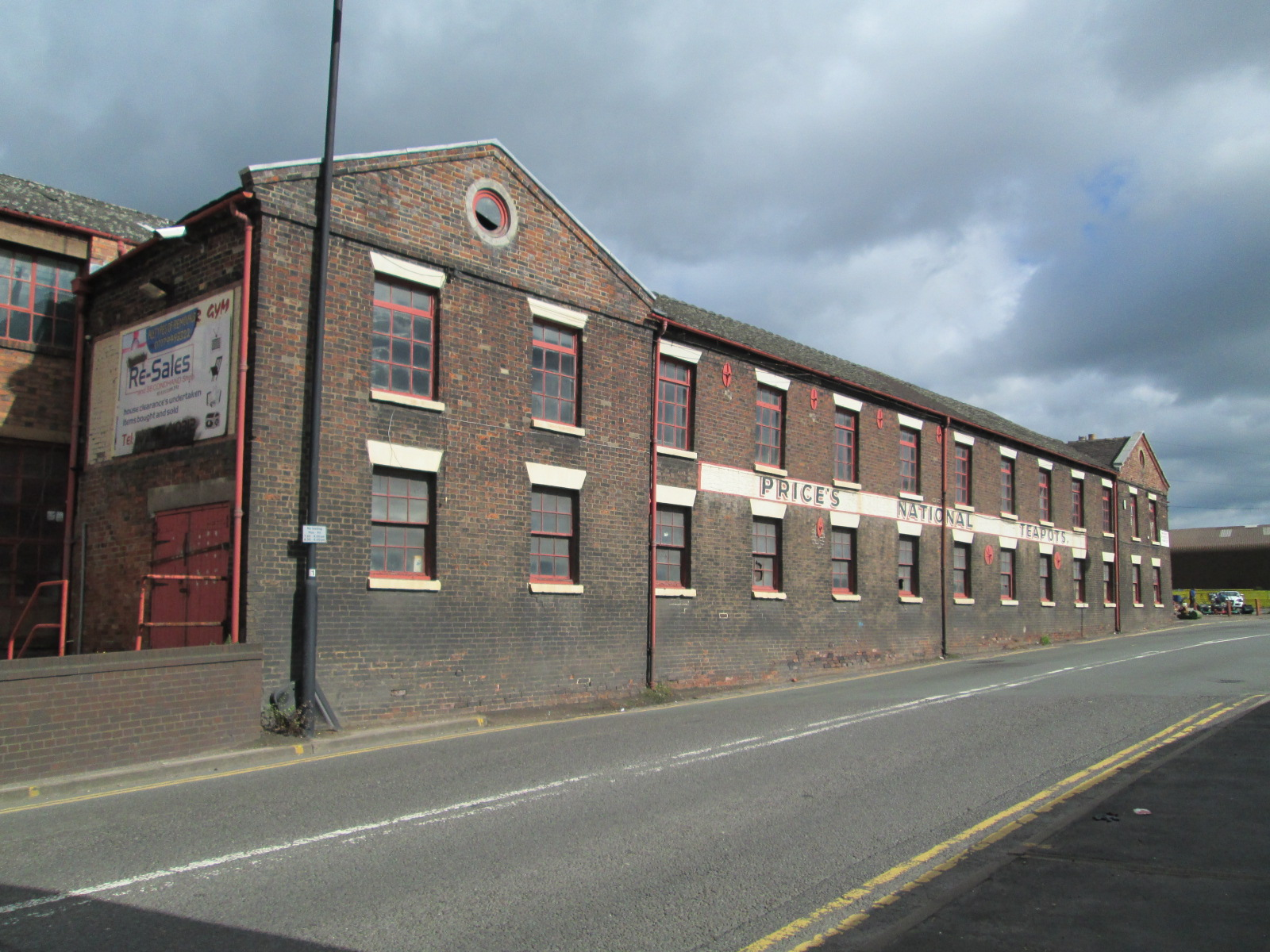
Price & Kensington Teapot Works, Longport: the frontage was demolished in November 2019

In November 2019, the Price and Kensington Teapot Works in Longport was demolished partially by Stoke-on-Trent City Council, after surveys revealed parts of the structure were at risk of collapse. The derelict building had been on Historic England's Heritage at Risk register. Councillor Daniel Jellyman said "... it is with deep regret that this privately-owned building has fallen into such poor condition... [A] part of the building is in an unsafe and dangerous condition, leaving the city council with no option but to take steps to ensure that the public are not exposed to harm." The Grade II* listed building, a former pottery works, is mostly of the early 19th century.

== Transport ==
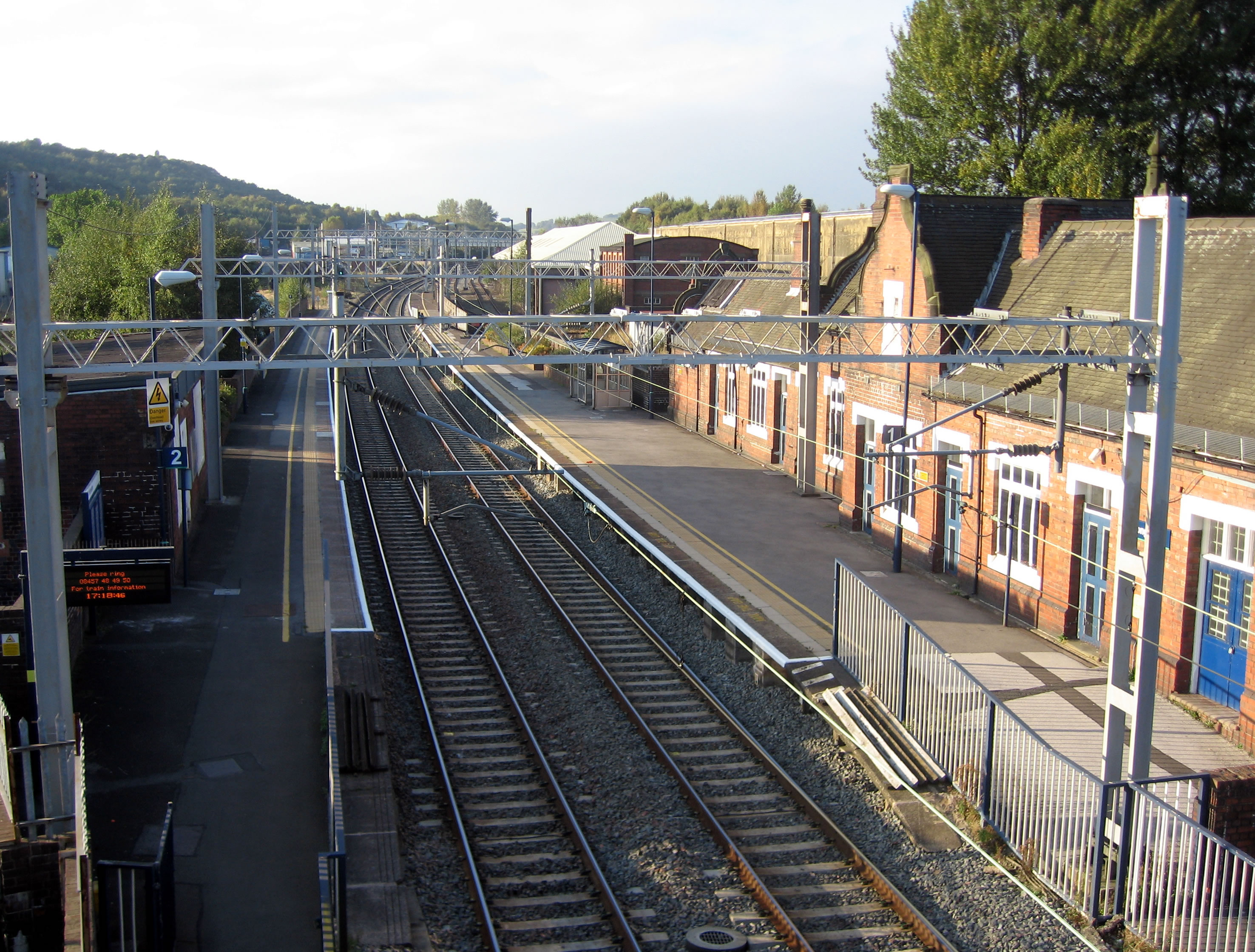
Longport railway station

The area is served by Longport railway station, which was opened by the North Staffordshire Railway on 9 October 1848. West Midlands Trains provide hourly stopping services each way between Crewe and Birmingham New Street.

In addition, services on the Crewe to Derby Line between Crewe, Derby, Nottingham and Newark Castle only stop at Longport in the early mornings and late evenings; these trains are operated by East Midlands Railway. The station is also sited on the Stafford to Manchester Line; Northern Trains services between Stoke-on-Trent and Manchester Piccadilly only stop here twice a day during the morning rush hour.

The A500, known locally as the D road, passes through Longport.

== See also ==
- Middleport
