= Longport =

Longport can refer to:

- Longport, New Jersey in the United States
- Longport, Staffordshire in Stoke-on-Trent, England
- Longphort, a term used in Ireland for a Viking ship enclosure
