= Sudbury railway station (Staffordshire) =

Former railway station in Staffordshire, England

Sudbury
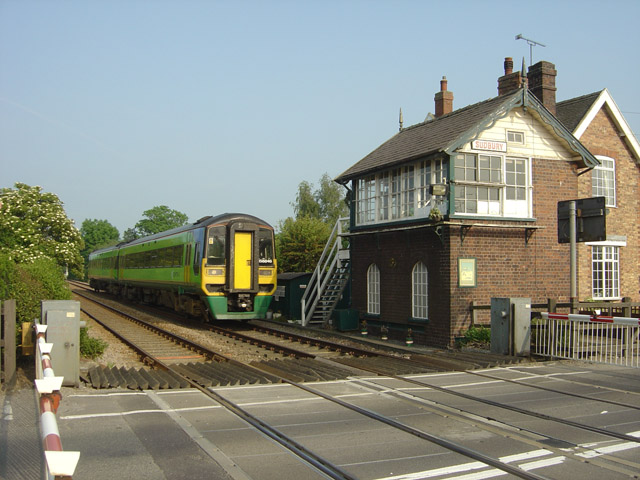

General information
- Location: Draycott in the Clay, East Staffordshire; England
- Coordinates: 52.8736°N 1.7612°W
- Grid reference: SK161307
- Platforms: 2

Other information
- Status: Disused

History
- Original company: North Staffordshire Railway
- Post-grouping: London, Midland and Scottish Railway

Key dates
- 11 September 1848: Opened
- 7 November 1966: Closed
Location

Sudbury railway station was a railway station serving Sudbury, Derbyshire although the station was located in Staffordshire, near to Draycott in the Clay.

The station was opened by the North Staffordshire Railway in 1848 and in 1862 it was also served by Great Northern Railway on the route between Stafford and Grantham.

The platforms today have been removed but the railway cottages and signal box are still in use, Trains on the Crewe to Derby Line still pass through the former station.

Preceding station	Historical railways	Following station
Marchington Line open, station Closed	North Staffordshire Railway Crewe to Derby Line	Scropton Line open, station closed
