= Scropton railway station =

Former railway station in Derbyshire, England

Scropton

General information
- Location: South Derbyshire, Derbyshire; England
- Coordinates: 52.8684°N 1.7153°W
- Grid reference: SK192301
- Platforms: 2

Other information
- Status: Disused

History
- Original company: North Staffordshire Railway

Key dates
- 1849–50: Opened
- 1866: Closed to passengers
- 7 December 1964: Closed to goods traffic
Location

Scropton railway station was a short-lived railway station in Derbyshire, England.

The railway line between Uttoxeter and Burton-on-Trent was opened by the North Staffordshire Railway (NSR) in 1848 and a station to serve the village of Scropton was opened at about the same time (the actual date is imprecise but the station was mentioned in timetables issued in 1849–50).

The station remained open only for a short time before being closed at the beginning of 1866. After closure the station site was used for exchange sidings between the narrow gauge Scropton Tramway and the NSR.

Preceding station	Historical railways	Following station
Sudbury; Line open, station closed	North Staffordshire Railway; Crewe to Derby Line	Tutbury and Hatton; Line open, station open
