= Etruria railway station =

Disused railway station in Staffordshire, England

Etruria
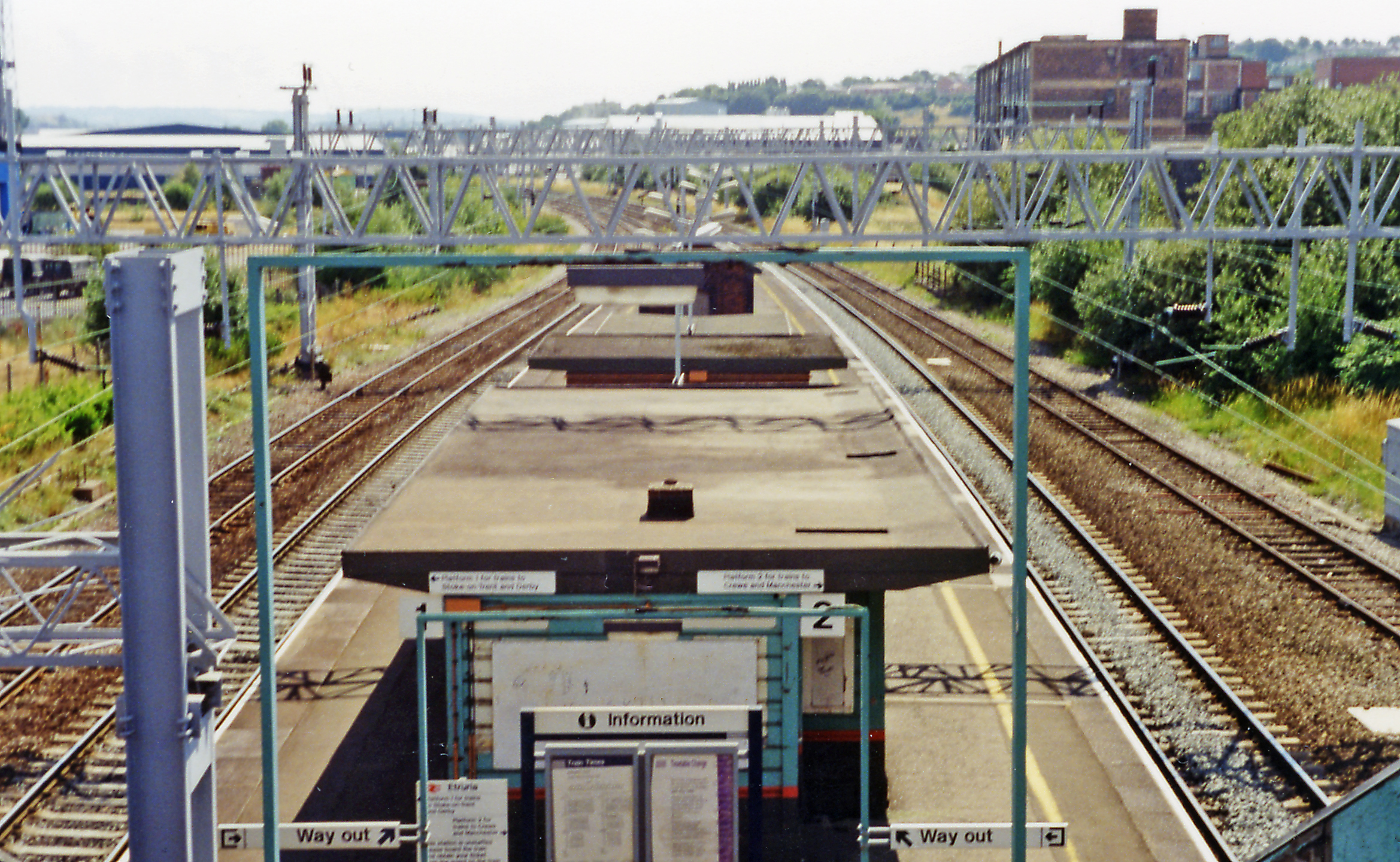
- Etruria station in August 1995

General information
- Location: Etruria, Staffordshire, England
- Coordinates: 53.0189°N 2.2014°W
- Grid reference: SJ865469
- Platforms: 2

Other information
- Status: Disused

History
- Original company: North Staffordshire Railway

Key dates
- 9 October 1848: Opened
- 30 September 2005: Closed

Passengers
- 2002/03: ▲6,566
- 2004/05: ▼1,798
- 2005/06: ▼497
Location
Notes
- Passenger statistics from the Office of Rail and Road

Etruria railway station served the area of Etruria and the town of Newcastle-under-Lyme, in Stoke-on-Trent, Staffordshire, England. It was closed on 30 September 2005.

== History ==
The station was opened 9 October 1848 by the North Staffordshire Railway and was modified by it in the 1870s, when the Potteries Loop Line was constructed. The station was an island platform situated underneath a bridge carrying the A53, approximately 1 mile (1.6 km) north of Stoke-on-Trent station. Its train services were suspended in May 2003 during the upgrade of the West Coast Main Line. Central Trains did not restart services to Etruria when the work was finished and continued to serve the station with rail replacement buses only, although First North Western reintroduced a limited service, beyond what was contractually required.

=== Closure ===
After already low passenger numbers dwindled even further, closure was proposed by the Strategic Rail Authority in February 2004. The closure was granted approval by the Department for Transport on 21 July 2005. The final train was Northern Rail Class 323 unit 323226 which left at 07:16 to Manchester Piccadilly. The closure was condemned by Transport 2000.

The platform signage and platform objects were removed in June 2006 and by December 2008 the platform had been demolished to permit the straightening of the track and remove a 60 mph (97 km/h) speed restriction to allow trains to run at 85 mph (137 km/h) southbound and 90 mph (145 km/h) northbound.

== Possible reopening ==
In March 2020, a bid was made to the Restoring Your Railway fund to get funds for a feasibility study into reinstating the station. This bid was unsuccessful.

A second bid was made to the Restoring your railways fund in 2021; this bid was also unsuccessful.

== Route ==
| Preceding station | Historical railways | Following station |
|---|---|---|
| Longport | First North Western; Crewe to Derby Line | Stoke-on-Trent |
| Longport | Central Trains; Crewe to Derby Line | Stoke-on-Trent |
| | Historical railways | |
| Longport Line and station open | North Staffordshire Railway Crewe to Derby Line | Cliffe Vale Halt Line open, station closed |
| Longport Line and station open | North Staffordshire Railway Stafford to Manchester Line | Cliffe Vale Halt Line open, station closed |
| Longport Line and station open | North Staffordshire Railway Sandbach to Stoke Line | Cliffe Vale Halt Line open, station closed |
| Hanley Line and station closed | North Staffordshire Railway Potteries Loop Line | Cliffe Vale Halt Line open, station closed |
