= Alsager railway station =

Railway station in Cheshire, England

Alsager
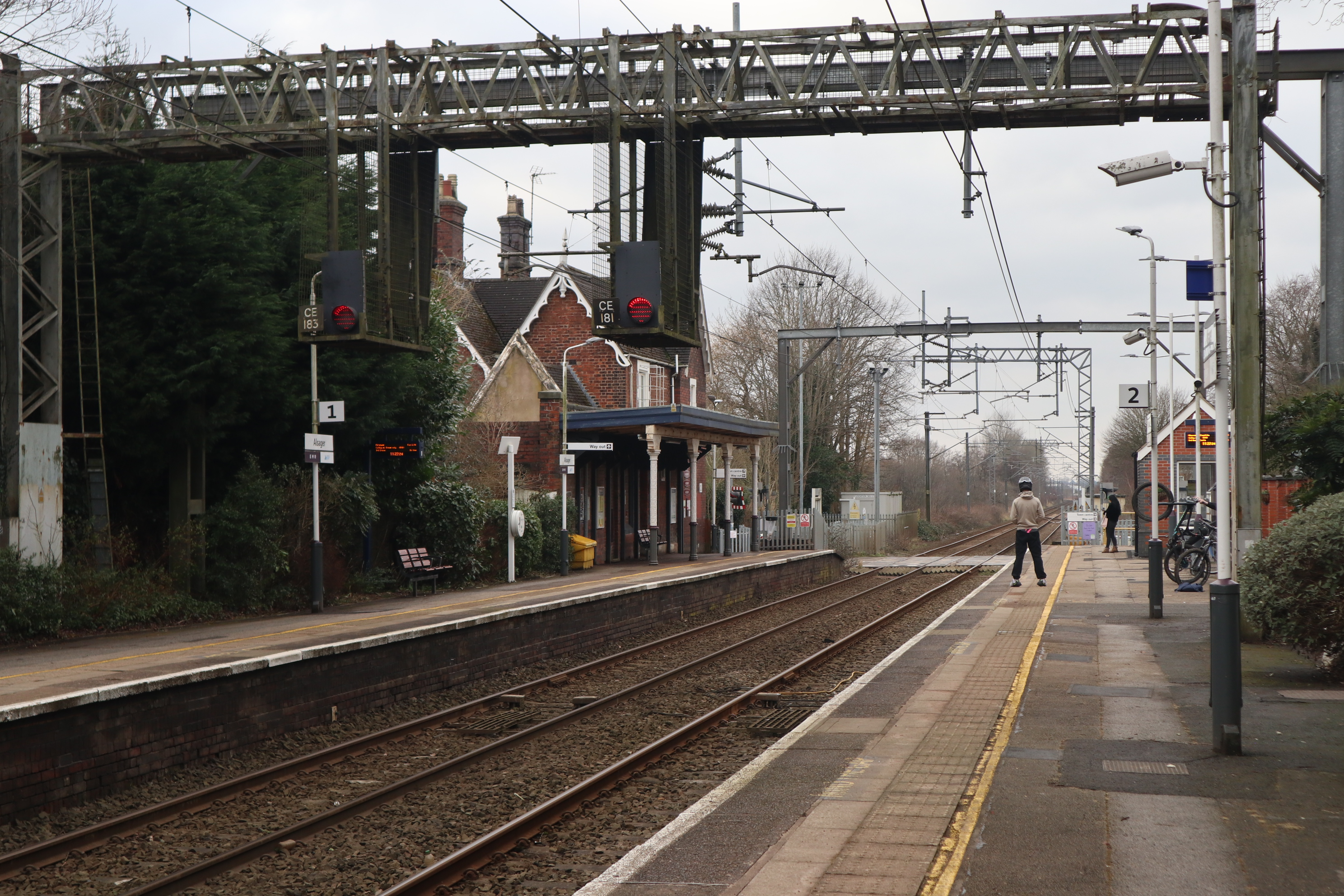
- Alsager station in 2025

General information
- Location: Alsager, Cheshire East, England
- Coordinates: 53.0928°N 2.2981°W
- OS Grid ref: SJ800551
- Manager: East Midlands Railway
- Platforms: 2

Other information
- Station code: ASG
- Classification: DfT category F1

Key dates
- 9 October 1848: Opened as Alsager
- April 1889: Renamed Alsager Rode Heath
- 2 April 1923: Renamed Alsager
- 2 November 1964: Closed to goods
- 1985: Signal box demolished

Passengers
- 2021/22: ▲77,184
- 2022/23: ▲94,662
- 2023/24: ▲0.101 million
- 2024/25: ▲0.115 million
- 2025/26: ▲0.126 million
Location
Notes
- Passenger statistics from the Office of Rail and Road

Alsager railway station serves the town of Alsager, in Cheshire, England. It stands next to a level crossing and is approximately 600 yards (550 m) from the town centre. The station is 6 1/2 miles (10.5 km) east of Crewe on the Crewe–Derby line, which is also a community rail line known as the North Staffordshire line. The station is owned by Network Rail and managed by East Midlands Railway.

== History ==
The station was opened by the North Staffordshire Railway company on 9 October 1848; it later became part of the London, Midland and Scottish Railway during the Grouping of 1923. The line then passed on to the London Midland Region of British Railways upon nationalisation in 1948.

When sectorisation was introduced in the 1980s, the station was served by Regional Railways until the privatisation of British Rail.

The line through Alsager was electrified in 2003, so that it could be used as a diversionary route between Kidsgrove and Crewe during West Coast Main Line engineering works.

== Facilities ==
The station is unstaffed; the full range of tickets for travel can be purchased from the guard on the train at no extra cost or from the ticket machine on platform 2. There is a car park with 14 spaces.

== Services ==
Services at Alsager are operated by East Midlands Railway using Class 170 diesel multiple units and by London Northwestern Railway using Class 350 electric multiple units.

The typical off-peak service in trains per hour (tph) is as follows:

- 1 tph to Lincoln, via Stoke-on-Trent, Derby and Nottingham
- 1 tph to Stafford, via Stoke
- 2 tph to Crewe only.

On Sundays, there is an hourly service between Crewe and Stafford; hourly services operate between Crewe and Derby after 14:00 only.

Preceding station	National Rail	Following station
Crewe	East Midlands Railway Crewe–Derby line	Kidsgrove
Crewe	London Northwestern Railway Crewe–Stafford	Kidsgrove
