= Harecastle railway tunnel =

Set of railway tunnels in Staffordshire, England

Coordinates: 53.0697°N 2.2322°W

Harecastle Tunnels
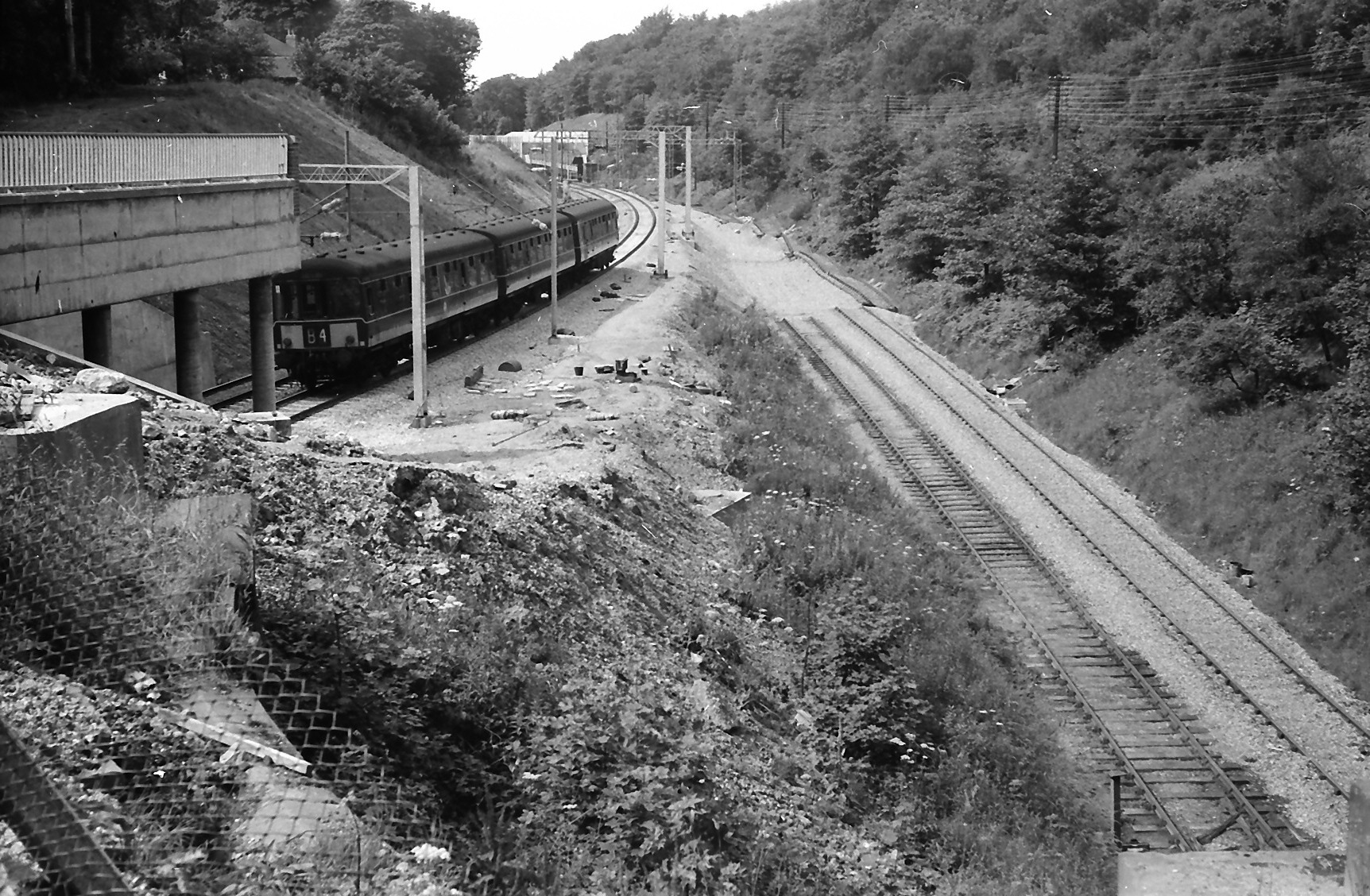
- A diesel unit heads towards Stoke-on-Trent through the new tunnel on the diversionary route c1965. The old line from the 3 original tunnels can be clearly seen on the right
- Interactive map of Harecastle Tunnels

Overview
- Location: Kidsgrove, Staffordshire, England

Operation
- Constructed: 1848
- Rebuilt: 1965

Technical
- Length: Three old tunnels totalled over 1 1/4 mi (2.0 km); 1965 tunnel 220 yd (200 m)

The Harecastle railway tunnels are three consecutive tunnels on the North Staffordshire Railway at Kidsgrove, Staffordshire, England.

Opened to traffic in 1848, two years after being authorised, the tunnels carried the North Staffordshire Railway line between Kidsgrove and Tunstall. The older Harecastle Canal Tunnels ran so close that vibrations from the trains allegedly affected their integrity. The Middle and South tunnels have been disused since the realignment of the railway in 1965 as their limited size made them unsuitable to install overhead electrification apparatus. In 2013 it was announced that the disused tunnels, which have continued to be maintained, would be sold to a public body.

== History ==
Construction of the Harecastle railway tunnels was authorised by the North Staffordshire Railway (Harecastle and Sandbach Line) Act 1846 (9 & 10 Vict. c. lxxxiv). An alternative route for the tunnels had been considered, but was discarded, partly because of objections from Thomas Kinnersley of Clough Hall but also because the alignment had gentler gradients. Another benefit of the alignment was that construction would be aided by using shafts driven from the pre-existing canal tunnels.

The North Staffordshire Railway commenced boring the tunnels almost immediately. Three tunnels were built on the alignment between Tunstall and Kidsgrove, commonly referred to as the North, Middle and South tunnels. Each carried a pair of tracks throughout, the North tunnel was the shortest at 130 yards, the Middle was 180 yards and the South tunnel, the longest, was 1,766 yards. The North tunnel was constructed using the cut-and-cover technique, unlike the other two bores. During 1848, construction of the Harecastle railway tunnels was completed.

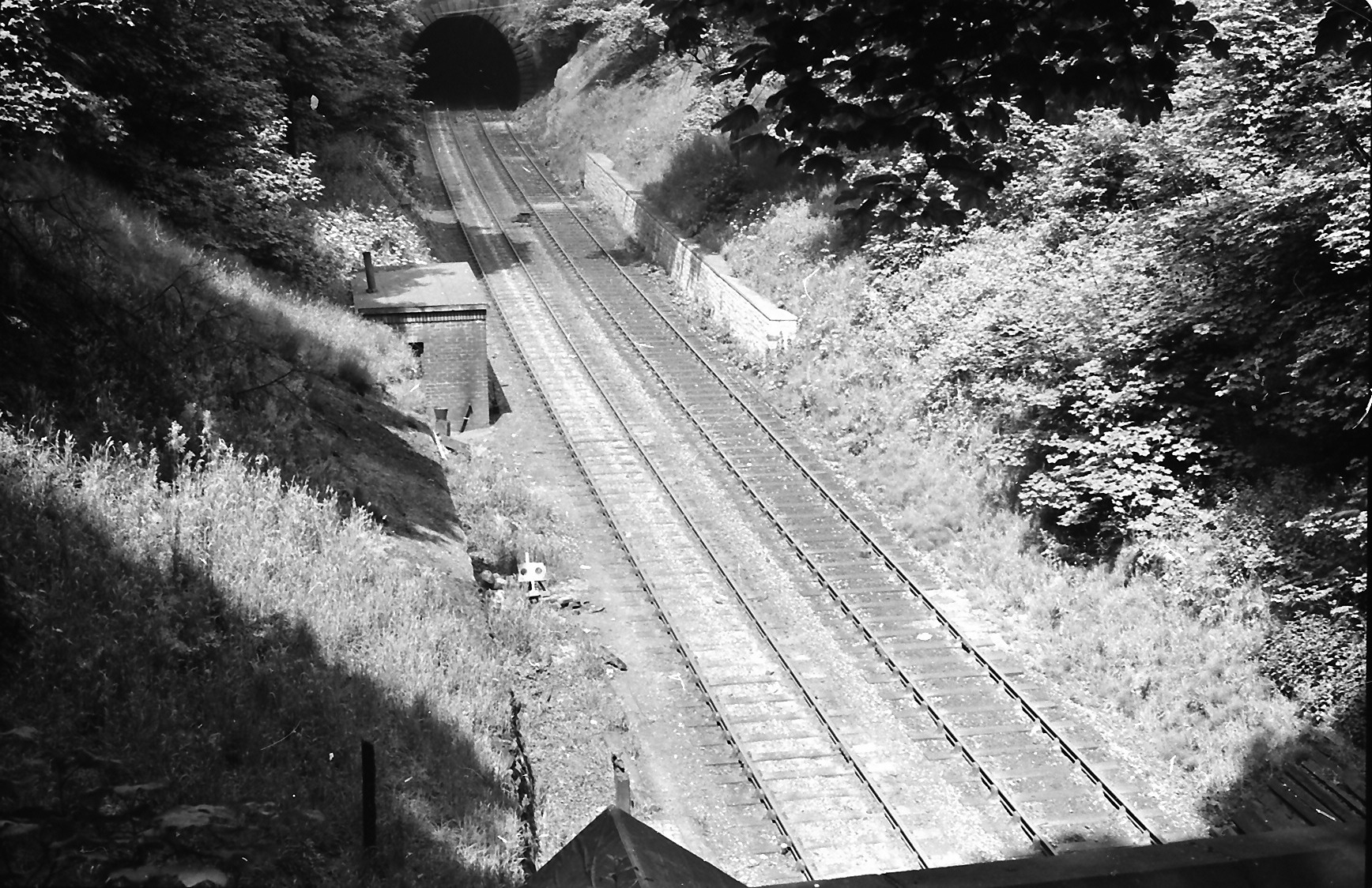
The northern portal of the South Harecastle railway tunnel, 1966

According to Basil Jeuda, the tunnels were a key link in Britain's rail system. The arrival of the railway negatively impacted the canal tunnels. In 1914, the older of the two canal tunnels was permanently closed by a partial collapse of the bore, allegedly caused by vibrations generated by trains passing through the railway tunnels.

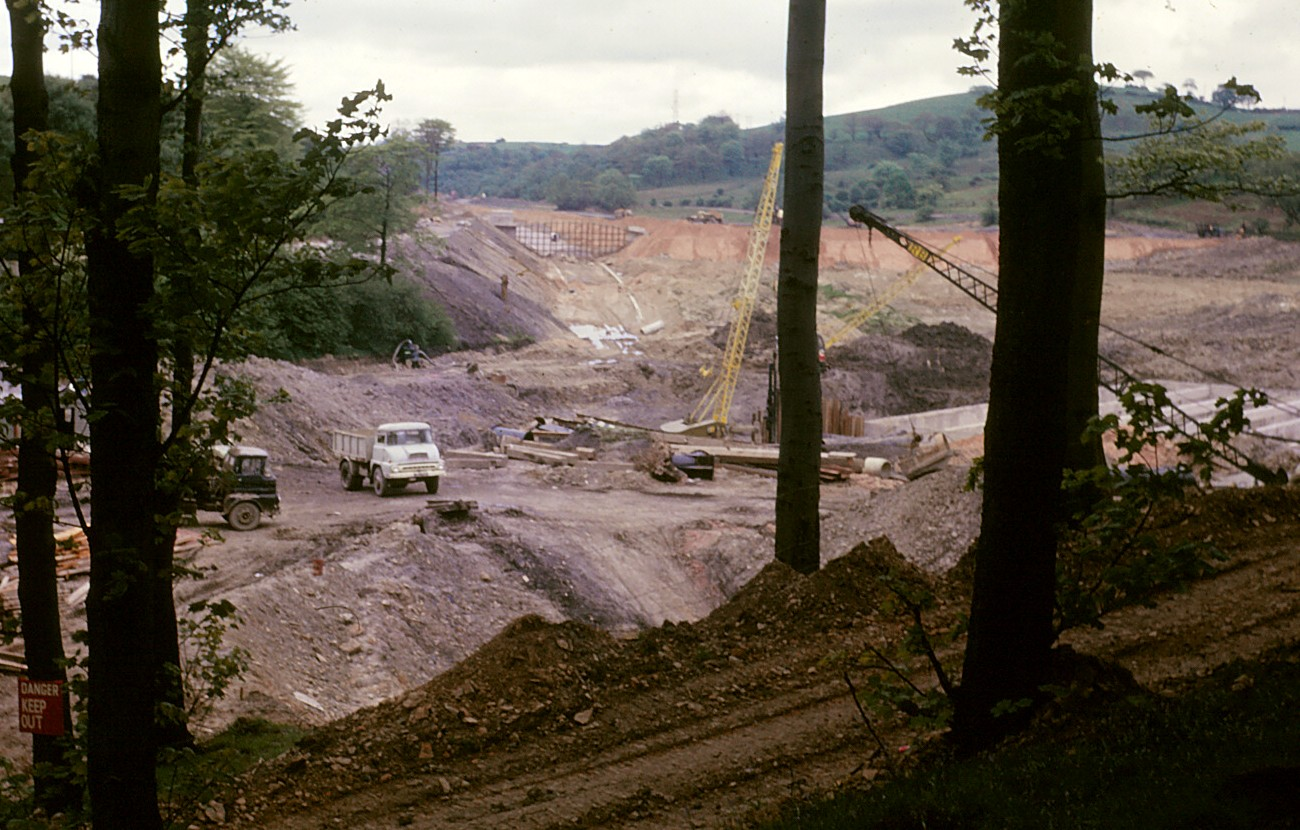
Part of the diversionary line under construction, circa 1965

In the 1960s, work was undertaken to electrify the West Coast Main Line. The Harecastle railway tunnels posed a challenge. The North tunnel was opened out using flying buttresses. The South and Middle tunnels were unsuitable for electrification because of their limited size and the line was diverted onto a new alignment running to the west through the Kidsgrove Tunnel that was bored to carry the diversion. The diversion starts about 300 metres south of Kidsgrove railway station, and rejoined the original line just to the west of Tunstall (roughly where the A527 crosses the line). The last trains to use the original alignment were run in 1965.

In early 2013, the British Government directed the Department of Transport to put the disused tunnels up for sale. It was stipulated that the new owner must be a public body and that they must continue to receive appropriate maintenance. The southern bore is reportedly flooded because its drainage is not maintained.
