= Kidsgrove railway station =

Railway station in Staffordshire, England

Kidsgrove
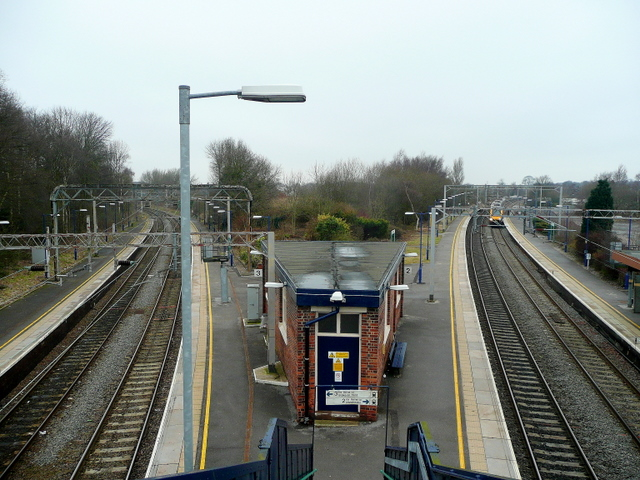

General information
- Location: Kidsgrove, Borough of Newcastle-under-Lyme, England
- Coordinates: 53.0863°N 2.2446°W
- Grid reference: SJ837543
- Manager: East Midlands Railway
- Platforms: 4
- Bus routes: 95: Biddulph to Audley
- Bus operators: D&G Bus

Other information
- Station code: KDG
- Classification: DfT category E

Key dates
- 9 October 1848: Opened as Harecastle
- 2 October 1944: Renamed Kidsgrove Central
- 18 April 1966: Renamed Kidsgrove

Passengers
- 2021/22: ▲0.189 million
- Interchange: ▲19,602
- 2022/23: ▲0.224 million
- Interchange: ▼16,881
- 2023/24: ▲0.244 million
- Interchange: ▲21,075
- 2024/25: ▲0.288 million
- Interchange: ▲31,758
- 2025/26: ▲0.311 million
- Interchange: ▼30,721
Location
Notes
- Passenger statistics from the Office of Rail and Road

Kidsgrove railway station serves the town of Kidsgrove, in Staffordshire, England; it lies 7.5 miles (12.1 km) north of Stoke-on-Trent. The station is served by trains on the Crewe–Derby line, which is also a community rail line known as the North Staffordshire Line. The station is owned by Network Rail and managed by East Midlands Railway.

== History ==
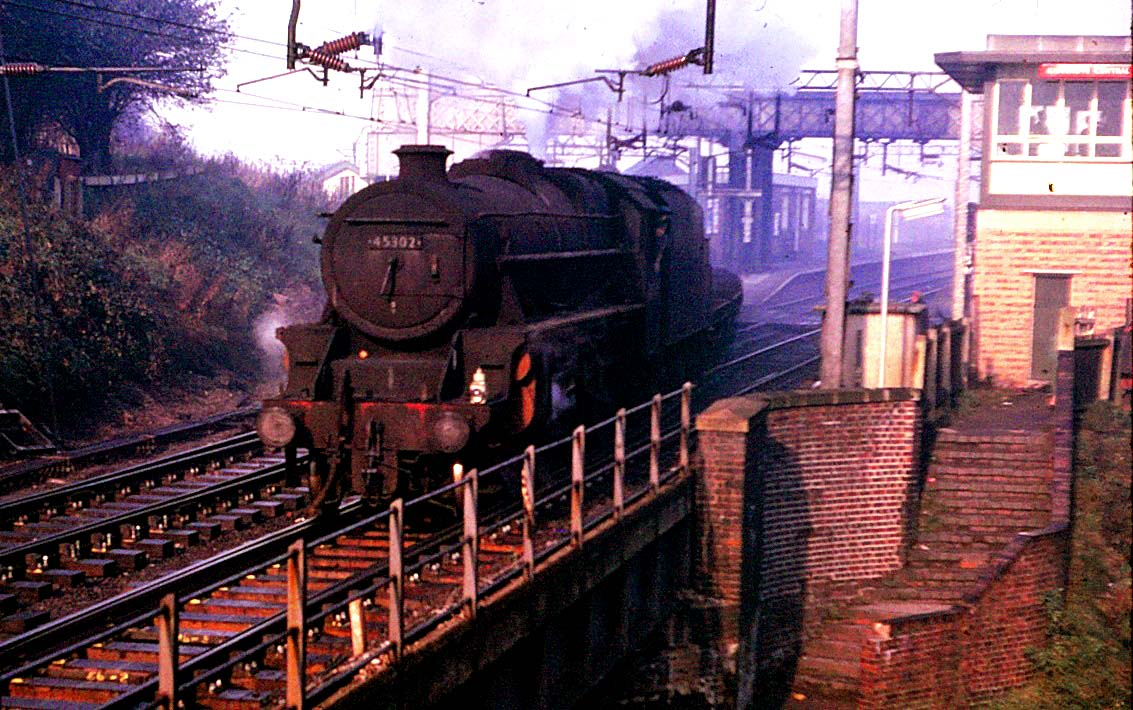
A freight train from the Crewe line in the mid-1960s, just before the withdrawal of steam

The present station was opened 9 October 1848 by the North Staffordshire Railway as Harecastle. During the early years of the North Staffordshire era, it was called Harecastle Junction, Kidsgrove Junction and Kidsgrove Junction, Harecastle, before settling upon Harecastle in 1875. Between 1885 and 1886, and 1923 and 1924, it was called Harecastle for Kidsgrove. In 1944, it was renamed Kidsgrove.

Under British Railways, it was known as Kidsgrove Central when the town had three stations; the other two were Kidsgrove Liverpool Road and Market Street Halt on the North Staffordshire Railway's Potteries Loop Line. It is situated on the Manchester branch of the West Coast Main Line, at the junction where the line from Stoke-on-Trent divides for Crewe and Manchester Piccadilly.

It lies just north of the Harecastle Tunnels, on the Trent and Mersey Canal, and the Harecastle railway tunnel.

== Services ==
Services at Kidsgrove are operated by:

- East Midlands Railway, using Class 170 diesel multiple units
- London Northwestern Railway, using Class 350 electric multiple units (EMUs)
- Northern Trains, using Classes 323 and 331 EMUs.

The typical off-peak service, in trains per hour (tph), is:

- 2 tph to Crewe
- 1 tph to Stafford
- 1 tph to Lincoln, via Derby and Nottingham
- 1 tph to Stoke-on-Trent only
- 1 tph to Manchester Piccadilly, via Macclesfield.

On Sundays, the station is served by an hourly service between Crewe and Stafford, with six trains per day between Manchester and Stoke-on-Trent. Hourly services operate between Crewe and Derby after 14:00 only.

Preceding station	National Rail	Following station
Longport or Stoke-on-Trent	East Midlands Railway Crewe–Derby line	Alsager
Alsager towards	London Northwestern Railway Stafford-Crewe	Longport towards
Stoke-on-Trent	Northern Trains Stafford–Manchester line	Congleton
	Historical railways	
Alsager Road Line open, station closed	North Staffordshire Railway Crewe–Derby line	Chatterley Line and station closed
Mow Cop and Scholar Green Line open, station closed	North Staffordshire Railway Stafford–Manchester line	Chatterley Line and station closed
Lawton Line and station closed	North Staffordshire Railway Sandbach to Stoke Line	Chatterley Line and station closed
