= Crewe–Derby line =

Railway line in central England

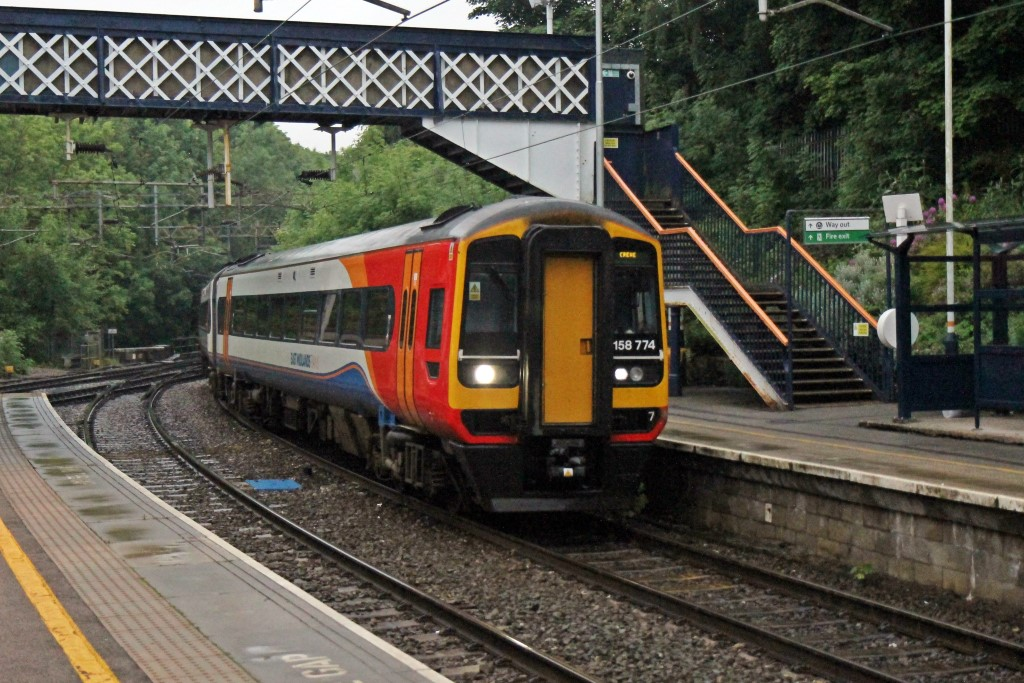
- An East Midlands Trains' Class 158 entering Kidsgrove (2015)

Overview
- Status: Operational
- Owner: Network Rail
- Locale: East Midlands; North West England; West Midlands
- Termini: Crewe; Derby
- Stations: 11

Service
- Type: Heavy Rail
- System: National Rail
- Operators: Avanti West Coast; CrossCountry; East Midlands Railway; London Northwestern Railway; Northern Trains
- Rolling stock: Class 158 Express Sprinter; Class 170 Turbostar; Class 323; Class 331 Civity; Class 350 Desiro; Class 390 Pendolino

History
- Opened: 1848

Technical
- Number of tracks: 2 (except Alsager-Crewe South junction which is single-tracked)
- Track gauge: 4 ft 8 1/2 in (1,435 mm) standard gauge
- Electrification: Overhead line, 25 kV 50 Hz AC; (Stoke-on-Trent to Crewe)
- Operating speed: 70 mph (110 km/h)
Route map
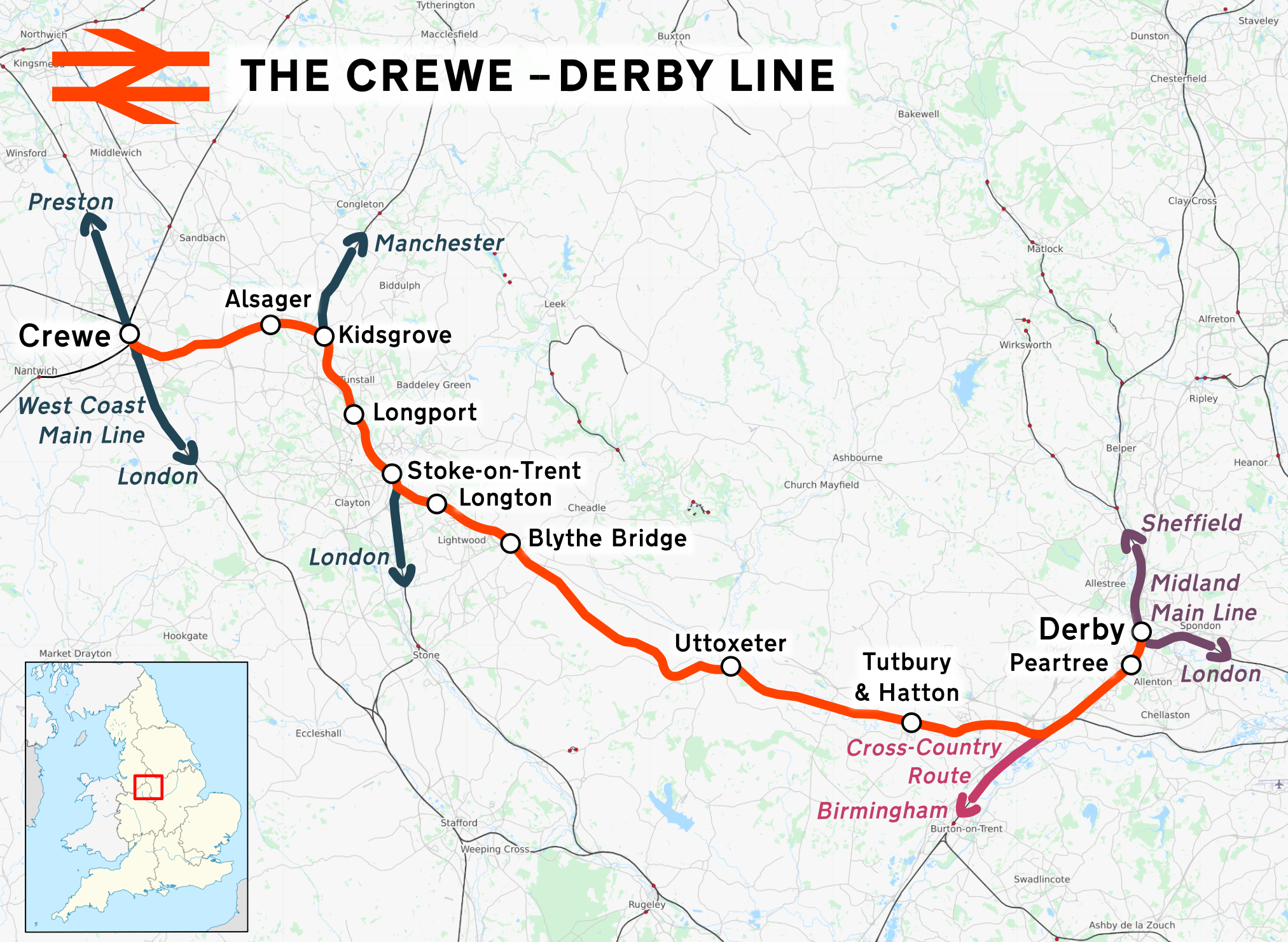
- (Click to expand)

The Crewe–Derby line is a railway line in central England, running from Crewe in a south-easterly direction to Derby, via Stoke-on-Trent and Uttoxeter. Passenger services on the line are provided by East Midlands Railway, with Avanti West Coast, London Northwestern Railway, Northern Trains and CrossCountry providing additional services north of Stoke-on-Trent to both Crewe and Manchester.

== History ==
This line was opened by the North Staffordshire Railway Company, and became part of the London Midland and Scottish Railway in 1923.

The line was opened between Stoke-on-Trent and Uttoxeter on 7 August 1848. The next stage from there to Tutbury and Hatton was opened 11 September 1848. Just beyond Tutbury was formerly a branch line to Burton-upon-Trent, having opened on the same date, but is now closed.

A separate company, the Cheadle Railway Company, built a line from Cresswell to Cheadle, which was opened throughout on 1 January 1901. It closed to passengers in 1953 and to freight traffic in 1978.

North Staffordshire Railway (Willington Deviation) Act 1848
- Act of Parliament
- Parliament of the United Kingdom
- Long title: An Act to authorize certain Alterations of the North Staffordshire Railway.
- Citation: 11 & 12 Vict. c. lxvi

Dates
- Royal assent: 22 July 1848

Text of statute as originally enacted

The section of line between Egginton and the Midland Railway's Derby to Birmingham New Street line was authorised by the North Staffordshire Railway (Willington Deviation) Act 1848 (11 & 12 Vict. c. lxvi), replacing an earlier scheme in the North Staffordshire Railway (Churnet Valley) Act 1846 (9 & 10 Vict. c. lxxxvi), and opened on 13 July 1849.

The section between Stoke and Kidsgrove is part of the West Coast Main Line which, together with the section from Kidsgrove to Crewe, opened on 9 October 1848.

By the 1980s, the Crewe-Derby service was operated by British Rail's Regional Railways sector, with services continuing to Nottingham then either Lincoln, or Skegness. When Central Trains was awarded the franchise for the line in the 1990s, it was expanded to run between Manchester Airport and Skegness. However, poor punctuality meant that this was later curtailed to Crewe-Skegness. In autumn 2005, further poor performance saw the through service limited to Crewe-Derby.

During 2003, much of the line was closed as part of the West Coast Main Line upgrade, with trains terminating at Blythe Bridge and a shuttle bus service running between there and Crewe. After the closure, all stations on the route reopened, except Etruria which was closed in 2005. As a result of the upgrade, the section from Crewe to Kidsgrove was electrified for use as a diversionary route for the West Coast Main Line.

In May 2021, services provided by East Midlands Railway were extended to provide Crewe and Stoke-on-Trent, with direct links past Derby to Nottingham and Newark Castle. The service is still run hourly and journeys between Stoke-on-Trent and Nottingham take approximately 90 minutes.

In December 2025 the timetable was revised and services were extended beyond Newark Castle to Lincoln.

== Route ==
The route starts at Crewe; from Crewe South junction, it then follows the Alsager branch as far as Kidsgrove. From here, it uses the West Coast Main Line until Stoke Junction, where it diverges. The route continues to Willington to North Staffordshire Junction, where it follows the Cross Country Route to Derby.

The line serves, or has formerly served, the following stations; those followed by (c) are now closed:

- Crewe
- Radway Green and Barthomley (c)
- Alsager
- Kidsgrove
- Chatterley (c)
- Longport
- Etruria (c)
- Stoke-on-Trent
- Fenton (c)
- Longton
- Normacot (c)
- Meir (c)
- Blythe Bridge
- Cresswell (c)
- Leigh (c)
- Bromshall (c)
- Uttoxeter
- Marchington (c)
- Sudbury (c)
- Scropton (c)
- Tutbury and Hatton
- Egginton Junction (c)
- Egginton (c)
- Peartree
- Derby.

All stations on the route, except for Stoke-on-Trent and Crewe, are managed by East Midlands Railway.

The route is double tracked for all of its length, except for a three-mile section between Alsager and Crewe, which was singled by British Rail. Whilst the majority of the route is not electrified, the section between Crewe and Stoke Junction is electrified.

In April 2006, Network Rail organised its maintenance and train control operations into 26 Routes. The line from Crewe to Kidsgrove (where it joins the line from Manchester Piccadilly) through to Stoke-on-Trent forms part of Route 18 (the West Coast Main Line). The line through to Derby from the junction just south of Stoke-on-Trent station forms part of Route 19 (the Midland Main Line and East Midlands).

== Services ==
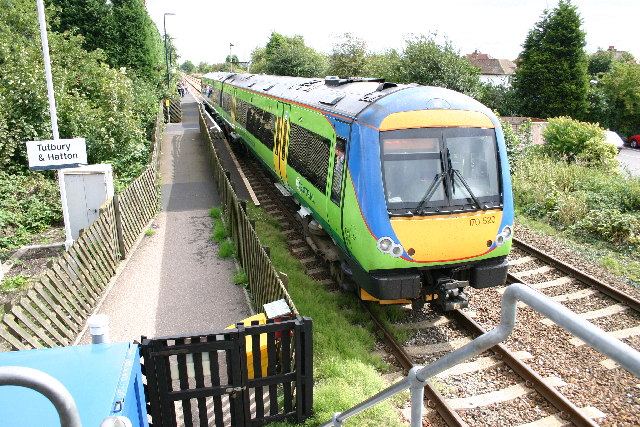
A Class 170 DMU arriving at Tutbury and Hatton in 2005, bound for Skegness

The line sees a basic hourly service in each direction between Crewe and to Lincoln, via Stoke-on-Trent, Uttoxeter, Derby, Long Eaton, Nottingham and Newark Castle. Trains call at all stations on the route except for Peartree, which is served by two Newark-bound trains and three Crewe-bound trains per weekday.

The majority of services on the route from December 2008 to February 2020 were provided by Class 153 Super Sprinter diesel railcars; however, Class 156 Super Sprinter and Class 158 Express Sprinter diesel multiple units (DMUs) were used occasionally.

From February 2020, the new East Midlands Railway franchisee started operating Class 153s in double formation and, occasionally, Class 156 DMUs; however, overcrowding remained a major issue on the route, particularly in the morning and evening peak, and on weekends. The reintroduction of Class 170 Turbostar trains on this route has eased congestion.

== Future ==
Former local MP Jack Brereton called for Meir station to be reopened in 2019.
