= North Staffordshire Railway =

Former British railway company

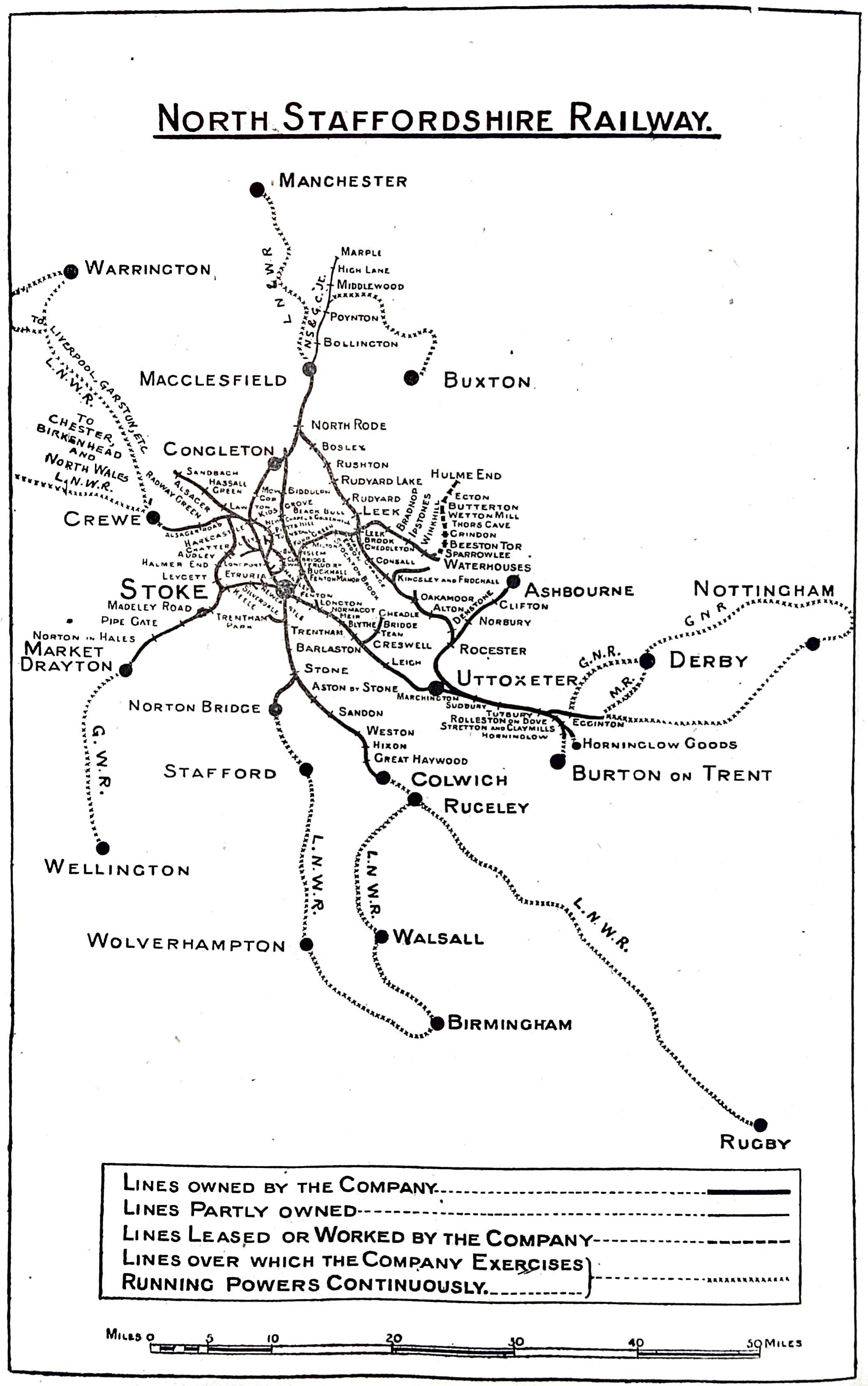
- 1920 map of the railway

Overview
- Headquarters: Stoke-on-Trent
- Locale: North Staffordshire; United Kingdom
- Dates of operation: 1845–1923
- Successor: London, Midland and Scottish Railway

Technical
- Track gauge: 4 ft 8 1/2 in (1,435 mm) standard gauge
- Length: 220 miles 47 chains (355.0 km) (1919)
- Track length: 524 miles 20 chains (843.7 km) (1919)

The North Staffordshire Railway (NSR) was a British railway company formed in 1845 to promote a number of lines in the Staffordshire Potteries and surrounding areas in Staffordshire, Cheshire, Derbyshire and Shropshire.

The company was based in Stoke-on-Trent and was nicknamed The Knotty; its lines were built to the standard gauge of 4 ft 8 1/2 in (1,435 mm). The main routes were constructed between 1846 and 1852 and ran from Macclesfield via Stoke to Colwich Junction joining the Trent Valley Railway, with another branch to Norton Bridge, just north of Stafford, and from Crewe to Egginton Junction, west of Derby. Within these main connections with other railway companies, most notably the London and North Western Railway (LNWR), the company operated a network of smaller lines although the total route mileage of the company never exceeded 221 miles (356 km). The majority of the passenger traffic was local although a number of LNWR services from Manchester to London were operated via Stoke. Freight traffic was mostly coal and other minerals but the line also carried the vast majority of china and other pottery goods manufactured in England.

As the NSR was surrounded by other larger railway companies, there were in the 19th century several attempts emanating from other companies or proposals from NSR shareholders to amalgamate with one or more of the other companies that adjoined it. None of these came to fruition and the NSR remained an independent company up to 1923 when it became part of the London, Midland and Scottish Railway Company.

The main routes of the NSR are still in use today; the routes connecting Stoke-on-Trent with Macclesfield, Crewe, Stafford and Colwich Junction remain in use as important parts of the West Coast Main Line, whilst the Stoke to Derby route also remains in use, however most of the less important lines built by the company have since been closed.

== Before the railway ==
The area of north Staffordshire known today as the City of Stoke-on-Trent was already a thriving industrial area before the arrival of the railways. The establishment of the pottery industry and the development of coal and ironstone mines in the 18th century had provided a need for materials, most noticeably clay, to be brought into the area. A corresponding need also arose for the resulting fragile pottery goods to be taken away from the area. This need had given rise in the mid to late 18th century of the construction of the Trent and Mersey Canal (T&M) and its various branches. Opened in 1777 it was a spectacular success and paid dividends reaching 75% in 1822. By 1845 this had fallen to a still impressive 30% despite the onset of railway development in the northwest England. In 1836 the canal carried 184,500 long tons (187,461 t; 206,640 short tons) of goods away and brought in 143,610 long tons (145,914 t; 160,843 short tons).

It was the Trent and Mersey Canal Company that built the first railway in north Staffordshire when in 1776 it was granted powers in the Trent and Mersey Canal Act 1776 (16 Geo. 3. c. 32) to build a railway, or plateway, from Caldon Low limestone quarries to the canal basin at Froghall in the Churnet Valley.

== Formation of the company ==
The Railway Mania of 1845 found the Potteries still without a railway, although the surrounding towns of Stafford, Crewe, Derby and Macclesfield were all connected to the fledgling railway system. The Staffordshire Potteries Railway promoted a route from Macclesfield to the Grand Junction Railway mainline at Norton Bridge plus a spur to Crewe. At the same time the Churnet Valley Railway promoted a line from Macclesfield to Derby with a branch to Stoke. After these two companies applied for the necessary powers to build the lines, Parliament suggested a pause of a year "to afford time for consideration and for maturing some more complete scheme for the accommodation of that important district".

The two companies decided to join forces to make a new approach to Parliament. They also incorporated in the scheme a proposal to join the Trent Valley Railway into the Potteries. To do this they promoted the North Staffordshire or Churnet Valley and Trent Junction Railway. This prospective company issued its prospectus on 30 April 1845 from offices at 1 Old Palace Yard, Westminster, London. There was to be a share capital of £2,350,000 (£247 million in 2025). in £20 shares (117,500 shares).

The prospectus outlined the NSR plans for two main lines. The Pottery Line running from a junction with the Manchester and Birmingham Railway at Congleton to the Grand Junction Railway at Colwich was promoted, as "giving the most ample accommodation to the towns of Tunstall, Burslem, Newcastle-under-Lyme, Hanley, Stoke, Fenton, Longton and Stone". The Churnet Line was to run from Macclesfield though Leek, Cheadle and Uttoxeter to join the Midland Railway line between Burton-upon-Trent and Derby forming a direct link between Manchester and Derby.

The company was formally incorporated in April 1845 under the shorter name of the North Staffordshire Railway. As a way of eliminating opposition to the company's bills in Parliament, and to allow it to promote a line to Liverpool, the company made an agreement to take over the Trent and Mersey Canal Company. This was achieved by T&M shares being swapped for preference shares in the NSR. These preference shares paid a guaranteed annual dividend of 5% once the entire railway was open. The total purchase cost of the T&M to the NSR £1,170,000.

On 25 November 1845 the Derby and Crewe Railway was absorbed into the NSR scheme. This was a line that was being supported by the Grand Junction Railway (GJR) running between Derby and Crewe via Uttoxeter and Stoke. It was to eliminate the opposition of the Grand Junction Railway Company to the other NSR proposals that the NSR agreed to absorb the Derby and Crewe. However part of the deal was that the proposed line from Harecastle to Liverpool was abandoned. Despite having arranged to purchase the T&M canal for a considerable sum, to obtain support for the Liverpool extension the NSR agreed to the GJR demand. All that survived of the NSR Liverpool plan was the short branch to Sandbach from Harecastle.

== Parliamentary approval and construction ==
North Staffordshire Railway (Harecastle and Sandbach Line) Act 1846
- Act of Parliament
- Parliament of the United Kingdom
- Long title: An Act for making a Railway from Harecastle to join the Manchester and Birmingham Railway at or near the Sanddbach Station thereon.
- Citation: 9 & 10 Vict. c. lxxxiv

Dates
- Royal assent: 26 June 1846
Other legislation
Repealed by	North Staffordshire Railway Act 1847

Status: Repealed

North Staffordshire Railway (Pottery Line) Act 1846
- Act of Parliament
- Parliament of the United Kingdom
- Long title: An Act for making a Railway from the Manchester and Birmingham Railway at Macclesfield to the Trent Valley Railway at Colwich, with Branches.
- Citation: 9 & 10 Vict. c. lxxxv

Dates
- Royal assent: 26 June 1846
Other legislation
Amended by	North Staffordshire Railway Act 1847

Status: Amended

On 26 June 1846, the three NSR acts of Parliament were passed with the total of £2,900,000 in share capital being shared amongst the three lines, with seven years allowed for the completion of each line. The North Staffordshire Railway (Pottery Line) Act 1846 (9 & 10 Vict. c. lxxxv) provided for the construction of the line from Macclesfield to Colwich with branches to Norton Bridge, Newcastle, Silverdale and Crewe. Approval by Parliament for building railways was needed to gain the powers for compulsory purchase of the land needed for construction. This act also vested the Trent and Mersey Canal in the NSR. Allocated capital for this work was £1,500,000. The second act, the North Staffordshire Railway (Harecastle and Sandbach Line) Act 1846 (9 & 10 Vict. c. lxxxiv) provided for the construction of the line from Harecastle to Sandbach, allocated capital for these works was £200,000. Finally the North Staffordshire Railway (Churnet Valley) Act 1846 (9 & 10 Vict. c. lxxxvi) authorised the construction of the line from North Rode to Burton, a branch from Tutbury to Willington Junction near Derby, and the line between Uttoxeter and Stoke; £1,200,000 of capital was allocated to this.

To start the construction work, there was an official sod-cutting ceremony. This took place in September 1846 The site chosen for the ceremony was a field in Etruria. A roped off enclosure for directors was created and the remainder of the field was reserved for invited guests. A mile-long procession headed by John Lewis Ricardo, Member of Parliament for Stoke-on-Trent and chairman of the North Staffordshire Railway Company, formed. On Ricardo's arrival, the crowds broke through the roped off area and Ricardo was pushed and shoved. During the actual cutting he buckled the silver spade and had difficulty removing the sod. Finally, his hat blew away.

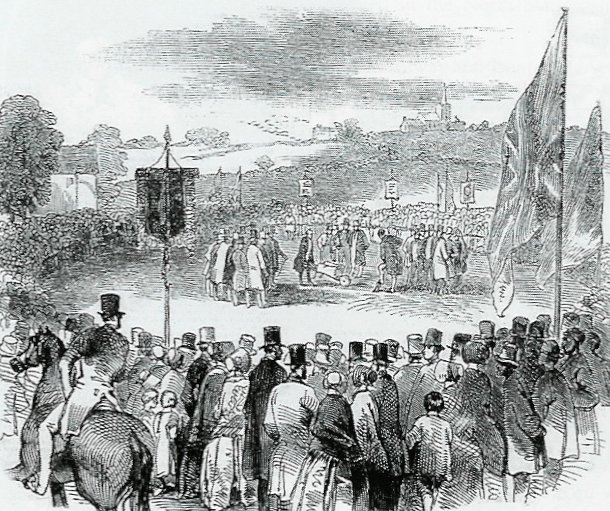
Cutting of the first sod at Etruria

Construction work went ahead under the supervision of the consulting engineer, George Parker Bidder. By February 1847 there were 1,318 men and 60 horses working between Macclesfield and Colwich and they had removed 80,000 cubic yards (61,000 m^{3}) of earth, driven 843 yards (771 m) of tunnel heading and erected 12,000 yards (10,973 m) yards of fencing.

North Staffordshire Railway Act 1847
- Act of Parliament
- Parliament of the United Kingdom
- Long title: An Act to consolidate and amend the Acts relating to the North Staffordshire Railway Company, and to authorize certain Alterations of and the Formation of certain Branches and additional Works in connexion with their Undertaking.
- Citation: 10 & 11 Vict. c. cviii

Dates
- Royal assent: 2 July 1847
Other legislation
Amends	North Staffordshire Railway (Pottery Line) Act 1846
Repeals/revokes	North Staffordshire Railway (Harecastle and Sandbach) Act 1846; North Staffordshire Railway (Churnet Valley) Act 1846

On 2 July 1847 the North Staffordshire Railway Act 1847 (10 & 11 Vict. c. cviii) was passed. This act was necessary was because of problems encountered with the construction of the Crewe branch. The opportunity was taken to authorise several other deviations and small branches. It also consolidated the previous acts and importantly, forced the NSR to ensure that all lines were completed by specifying that ordinary dividends were not to exceed 5% until the Churnet Valley and Willington lines had been opened.

Work continued apace and by 3 April 1848 the first freight trains were run. Passenger services started on 17 April 1848 and the first passenger train left the temporary station at Wheildon Road, Stoke, hauled by locomotive No. 1 Dragon, heading for a temporary station at Norton Bridge on the London and North Western Railway (LNWR). The opening of the line gave the Potteries a railway link with Birmingham and London which made it an instant success with the public. Profits for the first two months were £1,668, "exceeding expectations".

North Staffordshire Railway (Newcastle Branch Extension of Time) Act 1850
- Act of Parliament
- Parliament of the United Kingdom
- Long title: An Act to extend the Time for the Purchase of Lands required for certain Branches of the North Staffordshire Railway to Newcastle-under-Lyme, Silverdale, and the Apedale Ironworks.
- Citation: 13 & 14 Vict. c. lv

Dates
- Royal assent: 15 July 1850

Text of statute as originally enacted

The remaining lines under the original acts were opened in stages but all were completed and open by the end of 1852 when the Stoke to Newcastle and Newcastle to Knutton sections opened. A few months after the opening of the first line, the imposing permanent station in Winton Square, Stoke was opened on 9 October 1848. Stoke station then became the headquarters of the NSR.

== Later lines ==
North Staffordshire Railway Act 1860
- Act of Parliament
- Parliament of the United Kingdom
- Long title: An Act for relinquishing certain Works authorized by the North Staffordshire Railway Branches Act, 1854, and for authorizing Agreements with respect to the Silverdale and Newcastle Railway, and for other Purposes.
- Citation: 23 & 24 Vict. c. xlii

Dates
- Royal assent: 15 May 1860

Text of statute as originally enacted

Mr. Sneyd's Railway Act 1861
- Act of Parliament
- Parliament of the United Kingdom
- Long title: An Act to authorize the Construction of Bridges over Highways and Arches under a Turnpike Road and Highways in the Parishes of Wolstanton and Audley in the County of Stafford, and for other Purposes.
- Citation: 24 & 25 Vict. c. lxxi

Dates
- Royal assent: 28 June 1861

North Staffordshire Railway (Additional Powers) Act 1863
- Act of Parliament
- Parliament of the United Kingdom
- Long title: An Act to authorize the North Staffordshire Railway Company to make certain Railways at Burton-upon-Trent, and from their Railway at Burslem to their Railway at Cheddleton, and to acquire Station Lands at Burton and Uttoxeter; and for other Purposes.
- Citation: 26 & 27 Vict. c. clviii

Dates
- Royal assent: 13 July 1863

Text of statute as originally enacted

Later branches constructed in the 19th century included lines from Stoke-on-Trent to Congleton via Smallthorne and Biddulph; Stoke-on-Trent to Leek; Newcastle to Silverdale, Keele and Market Drayton (junction with the Great Western Railway); Alsager to Audley, Leycett and Keele, and Rocester to Ashbourne.

North Staffordshire Railway (New Works) Act 1864
- Act of Parliament
- Parliament of the United Kingdom
- Long title: An Act to authorize the Construction of several Railways and a Canal chiefly in the Parishes of Wolstanton and Audley by the North Staffordshire Railway Company, and to confer other Powers upon such Company and various other Companies and the Duke of Bridgewater's Trustees.
- Citation: 27 & 28 Vict. c. cccviii

Dates
- Royal assent: 29 July 1864

Text of statute as originally enacted

North Staffordshire Railway (Tunstall Line) Act 1864
- Act of Parliament
- Parliament of the United Kingdom
- Long title: An Act for making a Railway from the Potteries Line of the North Staffordshire Railway to near Tunstall in the Parish of Wolstanton in the County of Stafford; and for other Purposes.
- Citation: 27 & 28 Vict. c. ccxxxii

Dates
- Royal assent: 25 July 1864

Text of statute as originally enacted

North Staffordshire Railway Act 1867
- Act of Parliament
- Parliament of the United Kingdom
- Long title: An Act to extend the Time for the Purchase of Lands and Completion of certain Railways by the North Staffordshire Railway Company, and to enable the said Company to widen certain Parts of their Railways, and to confer various Powers upon the Company in reference to their Capital and the Undertakings of other Companies; and for other Purposes.
- Citation: 30 & 31 Vict. c. cxlii

Dates
- Royal assent: 15 July 1867

Text of statute as originally enacted

North Staffordshire Railway Act 1879
- Act of Parliament
- Parliament of the United Kingdom
- Long title: An Act for authorising the North Staffordshire Railway Company to construct certain Railways and Works for the improvement of their system in the counties of Stafford and Chester; to abandon portions of certain Railways; to appoint Directors of the Cheadle Railway Company; to amend the Company's Acts with respect to Tolls and Charges; to provide for the establishment of Hotels; and for other purposes.
- Citation: 42 & 43 Vict. c. ccv

Dates
- Royal assent: 11 August 1879

Text of statute as originally enacted

Also opened in the 19th century was the only NSR line to achieve any degree of fame, the Potteries Loop Line from Etruria via Hanley, Cobridge, Burslem, Tunstall, Pitts Hill, Newchapel and Goldenhill to Kidsgrove Liverpool Road. Authorised in stages in 1864–65, it opened to traffic in 1873. Its fame came from several mentions and a description of a journey on a Burslem to Hanley train in Arnold Bennett's The Old Wives' Tale.

North Staffordshire Railway Act 1895
- Act of Parliament
- Parliament of the United Kingdom
- Long title: An Act to confer further powers on the North Staffordshire Railway Company.
- Citation: 58 & 59 Vict. c. xxi

Dates
- Royal assent: 14 May 1895

Text of statute as originally enacted

North Staffordshire Railway Act 1899
- Act of Parliament
- Parliament of the United Kingdom
- Long title: An Act to confer further powers on the North Staffordshire Railway Company.
- Citation: 62 & 63 Vict. c. ccxxxi

Dates
- Royal assent: 9 August 1899

Twentieth century construction included the Waterhouses branch line, authorised by the Leek, Caldon Low, and Hartington Light Railways Order 1898 and the North Staffordshire Railway Act 1899. It ran from Leekbrook Junction to Caldon Low quarries and Waterhouses from where the 2 ft 6 in (762 mm) narrow gauge Leek and Manifold Valley Light Railway (L&MVLR) was constructed through the Hamps and Manifold river valleys to Hulme End near Hartington. Although the L&MVLR was nominally independent the NSR both worked and operated the line.

North Staffordshire Railway Act 1904
- Act of Parliament
- Parliament of the United Kingdom
- Long title: An Act to confer further powers on the North Staffordshire Railway Company.
- Citation: 4 Edw. 7. c. xliv

Dates
- Royal assent: 24 June 1904

Text of statute as originally enacted

North Staffordshire Railway Act 1907
- Act of Parliament
- Parliament of the United Kingdom
- Long title: An Act to confer further powers upon the North Staffordshire Railway Company; to confirm an agreement for the purchase by that Company of the railway of the Cheadle Railway Company, Limited, and for other purposes.
- Citation: 7 Edw. 7. c. cxlvii

Dates
- Royal assent: 21 August 1907

Text of statute as originally enacted

North Staffordshire Railway Act 1921
- Act of Parliament
- Parliament of the United Kingdom
- Long title: An Act to confer further powers upon the North Staffordshire Railway Company.
- Citation: 11 & 12 Geo. 5. c. cxvii

Dates
- Royal assent: 19 August 1921

Text of statute as originally enacted

Finally in 1910, the short Trentham Park branch line was built from Stoke-on-Trent to Trentham Park. It was authorised by the North Staffordshire Railway Act 1907 (7 Edw. 7. c. cxlvii) as part of an alternative line to Newcastle-under-Lyme but construction work beyond Trentham was quickly abandoned owing to rising costs. The same act of Parliament also transferred the Cheadle Railway to the NSR. The Cheadle Railway was a small local company constructed with the NSR's backing, built at great cost over a period of twelve years. It was a short line from Cresswell to Cheadle, this line, only 4 miles (6 km) long, included a very difficult tunnel. The line was opened from Cresswell to Totmonslow on 7 November 1892 and to Cheadle on 1 January 1901.

A full list of authorisation and opening dates for sections of the NSR is given below.

== Macclesfield, Bollington and Marple Railway ==
The Macclesfield, Bollington and Marple Railway (MB&M) was a joint line which the NSR participated in. A short line of just under 11 miles (18 km) it was opened with the Manchester, Sheffield and Lincolnshire Railway (MS&L) in 1869 to give the NSR access to Manchester independently of the LNWR. As relationships between the NSR and the LNWR grew better the reason for the line lessened as the MB&M route to Manchester was 5 miles (8 km) longer than the LNWR route. Both passenger and freight traffic was handled by the MS&L (or, as it later became, the Great Central Railway) with the buildings maintained by the NSR.

== Running powers with other companies ==
As a company with only a small route mileage the NSR made extensive use of running powers and in exchange granted running powers to other companies.

The earliest agreements were reached with the LNWR. In 1849 an agreement was reached where LNWR traffic could work over the NSR system but in exchange a certain amount of the LNWR London trains had to be routed via Stoke. These Manchester to London Euston restaurant car expresses were unique in often being hauled by NSR tank engines from Manchester to Stoke-on-Trent where the LNWR express engines took over for the run via Stone, Sandon, Colwich, and the main line to London Euston. The NSR received a payment for every through passenger on these trains and employed a small army of ticket inspectors to examine and clip (with its distinctive 'P' clip) every ticket during the Stoke-on-Trent station stop. The agreement did give the NSR access to destinations such as Llandudno, Manchester, Stafford, Wolverhampton and Buxton. NSR goods trains were able to run to places such as Liverpool and Rugby. The LNWR also used running rights over the Uttoxeter–Ashbourne line to run through coaches from Buxton to London via Nuneaton. As well as the running power agreements with the LNWR there was a very short joint line of 32 chains (644 m) at Middlewood and three jointly owned stations; Ashbourne, Colwich and Macclesfield Goods.

Equally important in terms of traffic but not as extensive in terms of route were the running power agreements with the Midland Railway (MR). For the NSR passenger traffic into Derby and Burton was authorised and good traffic as far afield as Wellingborough. The arrangements with these two companies allowed the NSR to run its longest passenger service, between Derby and Llandudno. These trains only ran 44 1/2 miles (72 km) on NSR rails, with 6 1/2 miles (10 km) over MR but with the majority, 67 1/2 miles (109 km) over the LNWR.

In 1867, an independent local company built the Stafford and Uttoxeter Railway, later incorporated into the Great Northern Railway (GNR). The GNR built its GNR Derbyshire and Staffordshire Extension from Nottingham and Derby Friargate via Mickleover to Egginton Junction with running powers over the NSR from Etwall, through Uttoxeter, to Bromshall Junction. The GNR granted the NSR running rights to Nottingham, Colwick, Leicester and Peterborough. Apart from excursion trains to Nottingham and goods trains to Colwick, the NSR did not take advantage of these powers.

Although the NSR had joint ownership of the MB&M with the MS&L the NSR did not have running powers over the rest of the MS&L and was content to let the MS&L handle all traffic north of Middlewood. Finally with both the NSR and the Great Western Railway (GWR) expanding into Shropshire running rights were agreed for NSR trains to run to Hodnet and Wellington and in return GWR goods trains could run to Stoke.

== Amalgamation proposals and financial strength ==
There were several proposals made either to the NSR or by it, to merge or lease or sell the company to other railway companies. The first was in 1849 when the LNWR, using its financial strength, made suggestions about a merger. To avoid this the NSR had to agree to the running powers outlined above. A further attempt in 1851 got as far as a parliamentary bill being submitted for amalgamation until the select committee appointed to look at the bill reported against the idea. The LNWR made a further attempt in 1855 which failed because of concerted opposition by the MR, MS&L and GWR. Less than twenty years later, in 1870, these four companies all combined to look at taking over the NSR following a decision by the NSR board to sell or lease the company. The four rival companies were unable to agree on who would take what share of the NSR and the proposal floundered.

In 1875, the MS&L proposed an amalgamation which initially found favour with the NSR board and shareholders but eventually fell through when the MS&L finances were investigated and it was found that the MS&L was no stronger financially than the NSR. Only two years later some NSR shareholders proposed a merger with the MR, the board dismissed the proposal with the chairman reminding shareholders that

The NSR had a small mileage and had to collect traffic for the large companies which surrounded it. They made profits from good mileages while the NSR had to do a great deal for comparatively little return.

The quote about little return was accurate. In 1877 the NSR dividend was only 2% compared with the dividend of 6% paid by the LNWR to its shareholders. A year later the dividend fell to its lowest ever point of only 1.625%. However it recovered and after 1881 never fell below 3%. In 1891 the NSR paid a 5% dividend for the first time, a level not to be reached again until 1913.

In 1913 the NSR ranked as the eighteenth largest company by route mileage with 216 miles (348 km). Passenger numbers stood at 7,200,000 and goods traffic handled by the NSR consisted of 1,750,000 long tons (1,780,000 t) of goods, nearly 4,000,000 long tons (4,100,000 t) of coal and coke and over 2,000,000 long tons (2,000,000 t) of other minerals. Among the 1,750,000 long tons (1,780,000 t) of goods was 150,000 long tons (150,000 t) of pottery, over five-sixths of the entire production in Britain.

== Grouping ==
Under the Railways Act 1921, the NSR was one of the eight major companies designated to form the North Western, Midland and West Scottish Group. This group became the London, Midland and Scottish Railway (LMS). The act came into force on 1 January 1923 but along with the Caledonian Railway, the NSR amalgamation into the LMS was delayed until 1 July 1923 due to certain legal requirements not being completed by the due date.

== Accidents and incidents ==
- In January 1885, a London and North Western Railway express passenger train collided with a freight train near Stoke-on-Trent. One person was killed.
- On 27 December 1864 there was a collision between a London and North Western Railway goods engine and van and a North Staffordshire Railway passenger train at Congleton junction where the Biddulph Valley line joined the Stafford-Manchester line.
- On 17 February 1899 there was a collision between two trains at Congleton railway station.

== Other interests ==
In common with most other British railway companies, the NSR decided early on that it was advantageous to carry out its own maintenance work in all departments and also to undertake much of its own new construction work. Stoke railway works were opened in 1849, capable of producing carriages, wagons and other equipment. Construction of locomotives followed later, commencing in 1864.

Ownership of the Trent and Mersey Canal made the NSR the biggest canal owning railway with 130 miles (209 km) of waterways owned. The T&M owned Rudyard Lake which the NSR made use of as a leisure complex, building a golf course, in 1905, on land adjoining the lake. A further area of interest, again via ownership of the T&M, was the lease on Caldon Low quarries. Associated with the quarry was the 3 ft 6 in (1,067 mm) tramway that ran from the quarries to Froghall making the NSR the operator of lines of three different gauges.

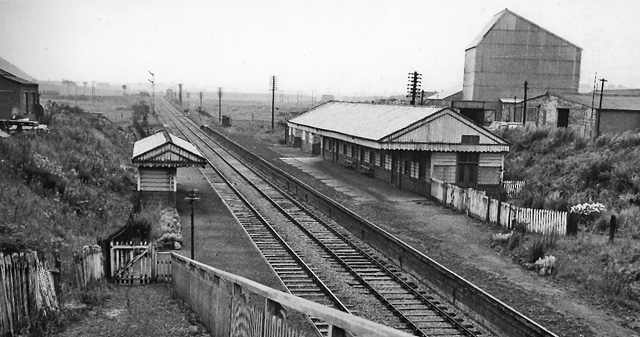
Bucknall & Northwood Station in 1962

Although the NSR principally served the urban areas of the Potteries, it did promote the area for tourism, especially the Churnet Valley which local hoteliers had labelled as "Staffordshire's little Switzerland". The company issued a 150-page guide called Picturesque Staffordshire to support this promotion and dispel the widespread held idea that the county was dull and bleak In addition to the tourist traffic generated the NSR owned three hotels; the North Stafford in Stoke (opposite Stoke station), the Churnet Valley in Leek and the Hotel Rudyard at Rudyard.

== Officers of the company ==
Name	Period of tenure
Chairmen
John Lewis Ricardo	1845–1855
Thomas Broderick	1855
John Lewis Ricardo	1855–1862
Thomas Broderick	1862–1865
Charles Pearson	1865–1874
Colin Minton Campbell	1874–1883
Sir Thomas Salt	1883–1904
Tonman Mosley (later Lord Anslow)	1904–1923
General managers
Samuel Bidder	1847–1853
James Forsyth	1853–1863
Percy Morris	1863–1876
Martin Smith	1876–1882
William Phillipps	1882–1919
Frederick Arthur Lowry Barnwell	1919–1923
Resident Engineers
Samuel Bidder	1845–1848
James Forsyth	1848–1865
James Johnson	1865–1870
Thomas Dodds	1870–1874
Locomotive superintendents
Robert Nichol Angus	1874–1875
Charles Clare	1875–1882
Luke Longbottom	1882–1902
John Adams	1902–1915
John Hookham	1915–1923

== Motive power and rolling stock ==
=== Locomotives ===
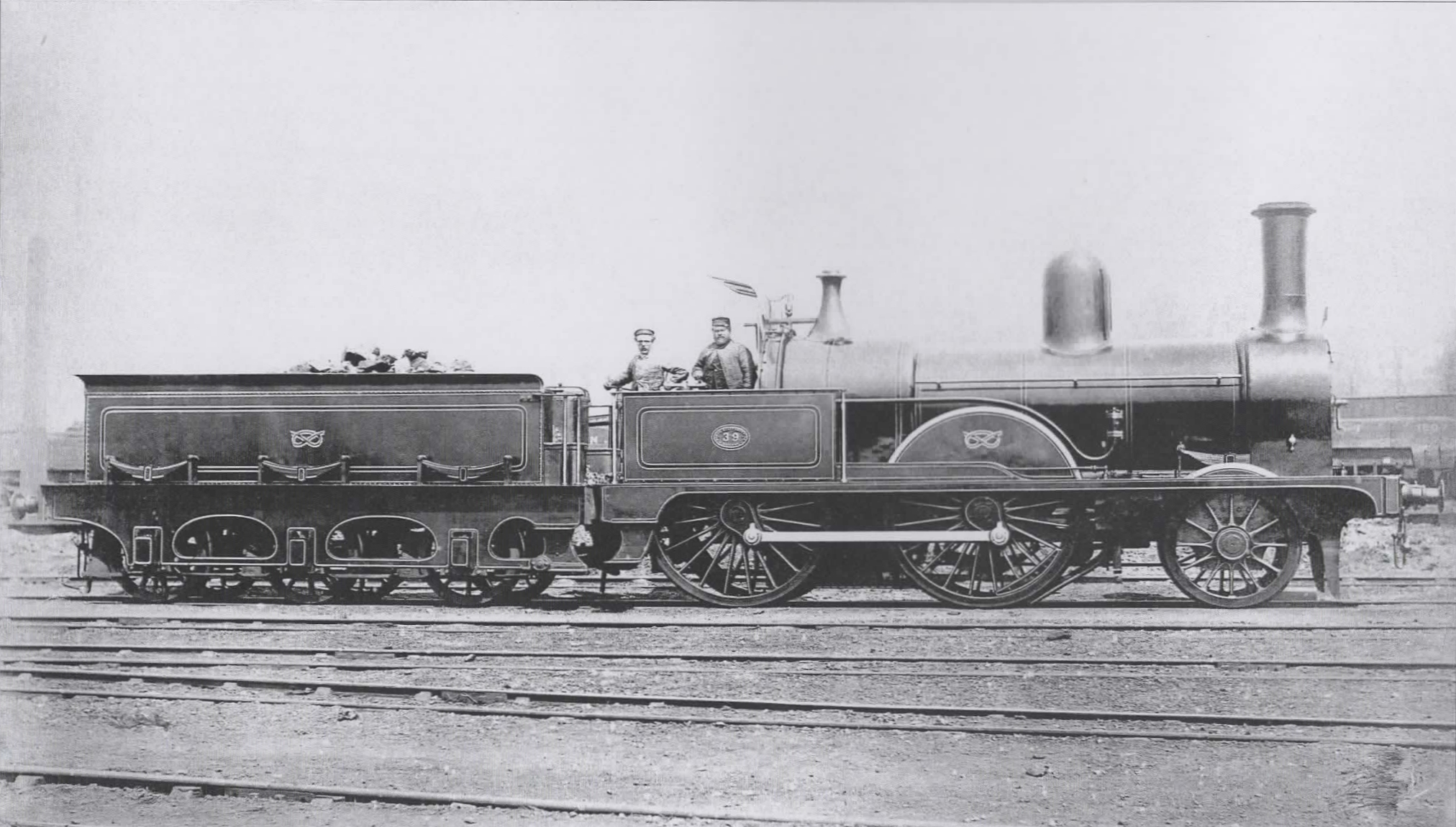
Dodds 2-4-0 No 39 as originally built

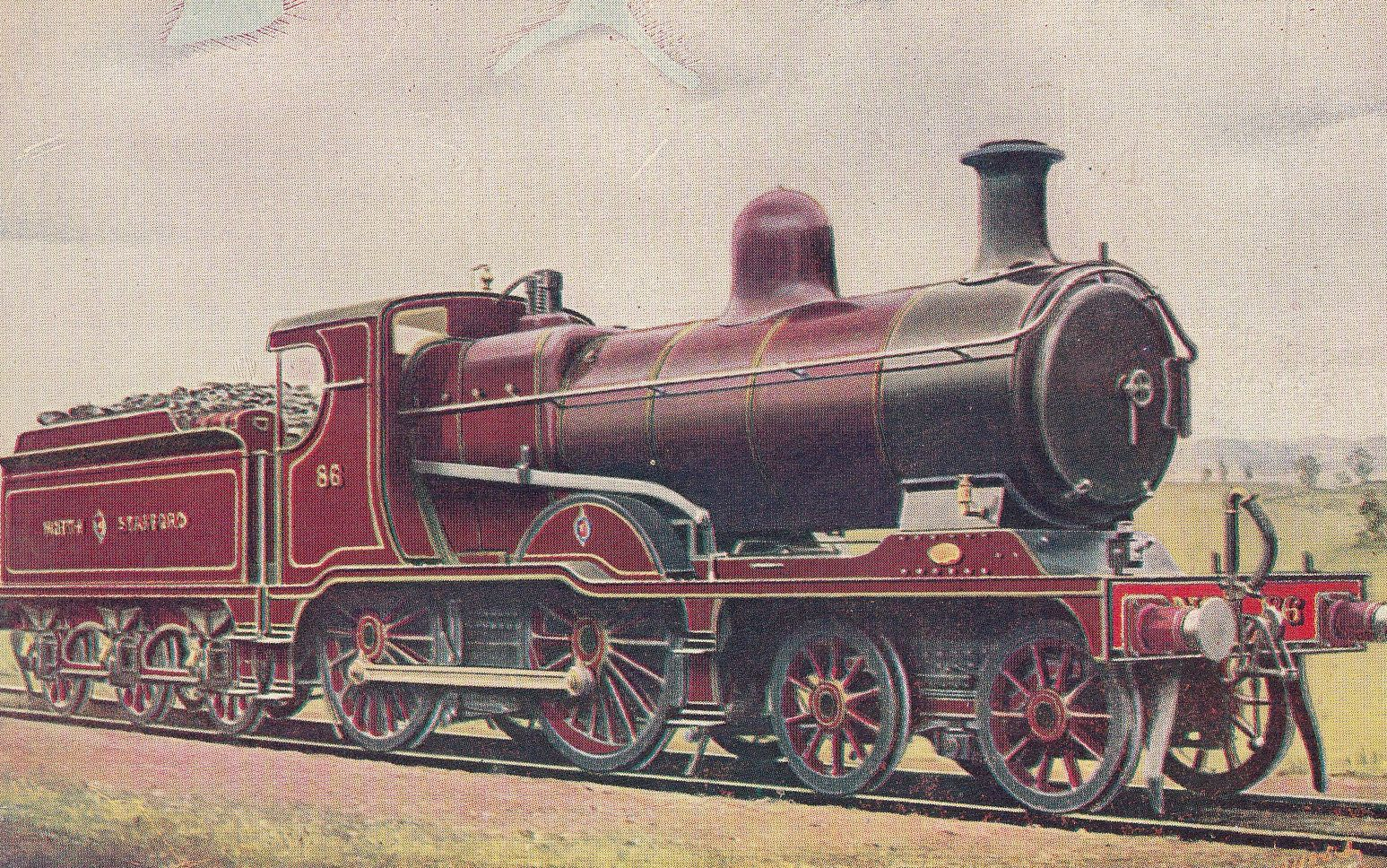
NSR G class 4-4-0

NSR motive power came from a mixture of sources. Before the establishment of Stoke works there was a complete reliance on outside contractors. The first locomotives were either purchased from contractors building the line or firms such as Sharp Brothers and Company, B. Hick and Son, Kitson, Thompson and Hewitson, the Vulcan Foundry or Jones and Potts.

Originally the resident engineers were responsible for the locomotive stock and the first four holders of this post were all primarily civil engineers. In 1863 the new general manager, Morris, commissioned an outside report on the NSR locomotive fleet which recommended the rebuilding of 50 engines. By the time this report was produced a new engineer, Johnson, had been appointed. He undertook the improvements but the results were unsatisfactory and Johnson left in 1870 after only five years in post. The only significant event of Johnson's tenure was the building of the first engines at Stoke works when three 0-6-0T engines were built in 1868. Johnson's successor, Dodds, fared no better as his patented wedge motion, a type of valve gear, was unsuccessful. Dodds was dismissed in 1875 and a new post of locomotive superintendent created with a locomotive engineer, Angus, in charge. Although only in post for two years Angus replaced all the wedge motions with Stephenson valve gear.

There followed a long period of locomotive construction internally with all locomotives between 1875 and 1900 coming from the company works. The vast majority of these being tank engines although a small number of tender engines were constructed. Most engines, whether tank or tender locomotives were built with either 2-4-0 or 0-6-0 wheel arrangements. An urgent need for heavier goods engines prompted the company to go to contractors and a small number of 0-6-0 designs were purchased from Nasmyth, Wilson and Company. In 1903 five 0-6-2T engines were purchased from Vulcan Foundry and with the exception of two locomotives for shunting purchased from Kerr Stuart in 1919 these were the last engines not to be built by the company at Stoke.

Apart from engine No 1 of 1848 being named Dragon only two other NSR engines were ever named, in 1882 Class C 2-4-0 No. 55 was named Colin Minton Campbell and Class C No. 54 John Bramley Moore after the chairman and deputy chairman of the company, respectively.

The NSR also used a small number of railmotors with three being purchased in 1905 from Beyer, Peacock and Company. They were used on routes such as the Stoke–Newcastle service but were not a success. The vehicles did survive until grouping but had been taken out of service for some time some years earlier. In addition to the NSR locomotives were the two engines of the Leek & Manifold and the three engines that worked the Caldon Low quarries. The former were purchased from Kitson and Company and the latter from Henry Hughes and W. G. Bagnall.

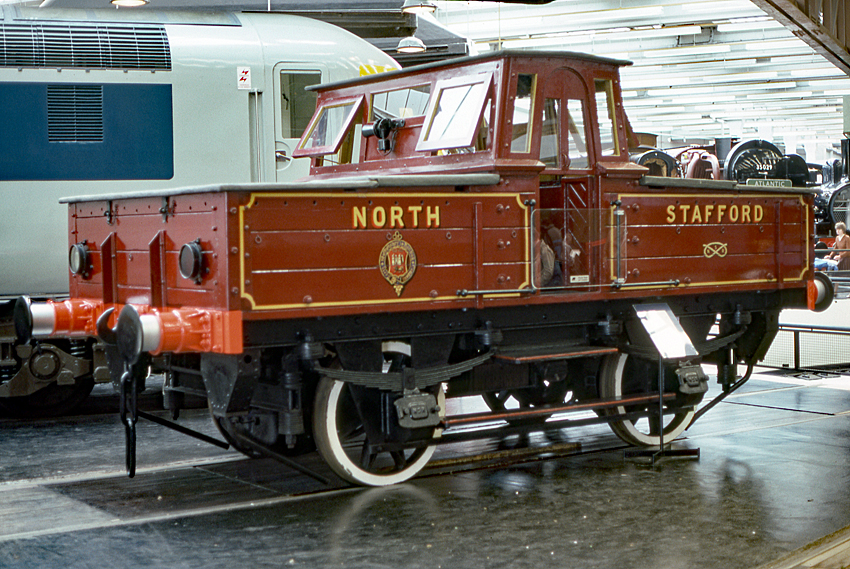
North Staffordshire battery loco in the National Railway Museum

At grouping 196 steam locomotives including the Leek & Manifold and Caldon Low engines were absorbed into the LMS along with the three railmotors and one battery electric locomotive. This last engine was built at Stoke in 1917 for shunting the copper works at Oakamoor. Four engines under construction at Stoke in 1923 were completed and also added to the LMS stock. Although many of the locomotives were not old, due to the LMS policy of standardisation all NSR engines had been withdrawn from service by 1939. The one exception was the battery electric shunting locomotive which remained in service until 1963.

Two NSR locomotives are preserved. NSR No. 2, an 0-6-2T New L class (one of the four constructed in 1923) and the battery electric locomotive. Both formed part of the national collection at the National Railway Museum until 2016 when ownership of the New L class locomotive was transferred to the Foxfield Railway.. As of 2026 the battery electric locomotive was at the Locomotion Museum in Shildon.

==== Locomotive depots ====
The largest locomotive depot was at Stoke, with 125 engines at grouping. The next largest was Alsager with an allocation of 15 engines. Other NSR depots existed at Macclesfield, Derby, Uttoxeter, Burton and Crewe. Stoke also had sub-sheds at Market Drayton, Leekbrook and Ashbourne. NSR engines were also sub-shedded at other companies depots, with arrangements existing at the LNWR sheds at Stafford, Liverpool Edge Hill and Manchester Longsight and the GNR shed at Nottingham Colwick.

==== Locomotive liveries ====
Up to 1882 locomotives were a bright green with black and white lining with a Staffordshire knot emblem on the tank or tender sides. Longbottom introduced a new livery of a red brown with black, yellow and vermilion lining. Longbottom was succeeded by Adams who changed the livery once more to a crimson shade called Madder Lake (Note: Although called Madder Lake, the pigment was not made from the Madder plant but from Cochineal.) with yellow and vermilion lining. The knot emblem was replaced by the company coat of arms and the words North Stafford.

=== Coaching stock ===
The NSR coaching stock was, even until grouping, predominantly four and six wheeled vehicles. Four-wheeled carriages were the norm from the start and the last were constructed in the 1880s, although by then they had progressed from the unbraked coaches of the 1840s with the introduction of the communication cord in 1869 and the simple vacuum brake in 1883. The first bogie coaches were introduced in 1906 for use on the Derby–Llandudno service and these were followed by further examples until 1923. By 1919 all carriages, except 13 four-wheelers used on miners' trains, had been fitted with steam heating and a number of vehicles had been fitted with through pipes to allow use in trains equipped with Westinghouse brakes. Most carriages were constructed at Stoke but some were purchased from companies such as the Metropolitan Carriage, Wagon and Finance Company.

One area where the NSR was a pioneer was in the use of electrical lighting being the largest of only three British railway companies (Note: The others were the London, Tilbury and Southend and the Great North of Scotland) to switch from oil to electric lighting and not use any form of gas lighting. The first coach was fitted in 1897 and new stock constructed from 1899 had electric lighting as standard. Conversion of the remaining stock was slow and in 1910 there were still some oil-lit carriages in service.

==== Coaching liveries ====
Coaching stock was originally claret but in 1875 was changed to Victoria Brown and white (except for branch line trains which carried an all over Victoria Brown livery) with gold and blue lining. Victoria Brown was the same red brown colour as Longbottom had introduced for NSR locomotives. In 1882 waist panels were additionally painted white. This colour scheme lasted until 1896 when it was changed to an overall Victoria Lake (brown) colour with gold and blue lining. Adams changed the livery to Madder Lake in 1903 to match the locomotives, the lining became yellow and red. A final minor change was to paint the waist panels of first class compartments cream to distinguish them. A constant presence was the company coat of arms being displayed on the coach sides.

=== Goods stock ===
Over its life the NSR built or bought many thousands of goods wagons. Early wagons had dumb buffers with spring buffers being introduced from 1870. Early wagons were not of high capacity, typical open wagons only carried 4 long tons (4.1 t). This increased to 10 long tons (10.2 t) on average by 1923.

The NSR handed over 6,612 goods wagons to the LMS, of which over 5,000 were open wagons for the transport of coal and other minerals. This number was dwarfed by the wagons owned by the pits, ironworks, other industrial operations and traders in the Stoke area. An unusual set of wagons were the bright yellow vans with red lettering owned by the Barnum and Bailey circus who had their main English depot in Stoke.

==== Goods liveries ====
Goods vehicles were painted red oxide with white lettering and a white Staffordshire knot. The letters N.S.R with only two full stops were carried in small letters. From 1912 the letters were increased in size but changed to just N S with a central knot and no full stops.

== The Knotty ==
The NSR is one of the few railways to become the subject of a play. In 1966, Peter Cheeseman, artistic director of the Victoria Theatre, Stoke wrote a musical documentary about the NSR called The Knotty. Featured in the play were the voices of several NSR staff who had been interviewed especially for the play. The script with introductory notes by Cheeseman was published in 1970. Sound recordings of the production, The Knotty – a musical documentary, was released on LP by Argo Transacord in 1970 and as a digital version in 2014.

== NSR main lines and branch lines—opening dates ==
John Lewis Ricardo, chairman of the North Staffordshire Railway, described the network as being like "a small octopus"; but not one NSR station was more than 30 miles (48 km) from Stoke-on-Trent. Dates of authorisation and opening are given in the following table.

Section of line	Date construction authorised	Passenger service started	Goods service started
Stoke-on-Trent – Norton Bridge	26 June 1846	17 April 1848	3 April 1848
Stoke-on-Trent – Uttoxeter	26 June 1846	7 August 1848	7 August 1848
Uttoxeter – Burton-on-Trent	26 June 1846	11 September 1848	11 September 1848
Stoke-on-Trent – Crewe and Congleton	26 June 1846	9 October 1848	9 October 1848
Stone–Colwich	26 June 1846	1 May 1849	1 May 1849
Congleton–Macclesfield	26 June 1846	18 June 1849	18 June 1849
Churnet Valley Line	26 June 1846	13 July 1849	13 July 1849
Tutbury–Derby	26 June 1846	13 July 1849	13 July 1849
Harecastle–Sandbach	26 June 1846	3 July 1893	21 January 1852
Stoke-on-Trent – Newcastle-under-Lyme	26 June 1846	6 September 1852	6 September 1852
Newcastle-under-Lyme – Knutton	2 July 1847	May 1863	6 September 1852
Knutton – Silverdale	13 August 1859	May 1863	1850 (Note: Goods traffic between Knutton and Silverdale started in 1850, even though it was not authorised until nine years later. Ralph Sneyd owned collieries and ironworks in the Silverdale area. In 1849 Sneyd began construction of his own private goods line which was about 2 miles (3.2 km) long – this was not authorised by Parliament. When the NSR came to build its lines in this area they took a 999 year lease of Mr Sneyd's private line and incorporated it into its own network. Authorisation for the line was granted retrospectively by Mr. Sneyd's Railway Act 1861 (24 & 25 Vict. c. lxxi))
Silverdale – Market Drayton	29 July 1864	1 February 1870	1 February 1870
Etruria–Shelton	2 July 1847	January 1862	1850
Shelton–Hanley	13 August 1859	13 July 1864	20 December 1861
Hanley–Burslem	5 July 1865	1 November 1873	1 November 1873
Burslem–Tunstall	5 July 1865	1 December 1873	1 December 1873
Tunstall–Goldenhill	5 July 1865	1 October 1874	1 October 1874
Goldenhill–Kidsgrove	5 July 1865	15 November 1875	15 November 1875
Rocester–Ashbourne	22 July 1848	31 May 1852	31 May 1852
Biddulph Valley Line	24 July 1854	1 June 1864	28 August 1860
Milton Junction - Leek Brook Junction	13 July 1863	1 November 1867	1 November 1867
Audley Line	29 July 1864	28 June 1880	24 July 1870
Cresswell–Tean	7 August 1888	7 November 1892	7 November 1892
Tean–Cheadle	7 August 1888	1 January 1901	1 January 1901
Waterhouses – Hulme End (L&MVLR)	6 March 1899	27 June 1904	29 June 1904
Leek Brook – Ipstones	6 March 1899	5 June 1905	5 June 1905
Ipstones – Waterhouses	6 March 1899	1 July 1905	1 July 1905
Trentham Park Branch	21 August 1907	1 April 1910	1 April 1910

== Notes ==
=== Sources ===
- Christiansen, Rex; Miller, Robert William (1971). The North Staffordshire Railway. Newton Abbot, Devon: David & Charles. ISBN 0-7153-5121-4.
- Christiansen, Rex (1997). Portrait of the North Staffordshire Railway. Shepperton, Surrey: Ian Allan. ISBN 0-7110-2546-0.
- Dow, George (1970). North Staffordshire Album. Shepperton, Surrey: Ian Allan. ISBN 0-7110-0128-6.
- Essery, Bob; Jenkinson, David (1981). An Illustrated History of LMS Locomotives. Volume 1: General Review and Locomotive Liveries. Oxford: Oxford Publishing. ISBN 0-86093-087-4.
- Hall, Stanley (1990). The Railway Detectives. London: Ian Allan. ISBN 0-7110-1929-0.
- Jenkinson, David (1988). British railway carriages of the 20th century. Volume 1: The end of an era, 1901–1922. London: Guild Publishing. ISBN 0-85059-912-1.
- Jeuda, Basil (1999a). The Churnet Valley Railway. Lydney, Gloucestershire: Lightmoor Press. ISBN 978-1-899889-05-1.
- Jeuda, Basil (1999b). The Knotty, an illustrated survey of the North Staffordshire Railway. Lydney, Gloucestershire: Lightmoor Press. ISBN 1-899889-01-9.
- Kelly's directory of Staffordshire. London: Kelly & Co. 1896.
- Manifold (1952). The North Staffordshire Railway. A history of the line and its locomotives. Ashbourne: Henstock. OCLC 752710358.
- Nock, Oliver (1982). A History of the LMS: The first years 1923–1930. Vol. 1. London: George Allen & Unwin. ISBN 0-04-385087-1.
- Rowledge, John W P (1989). LMS Engines: names, numbers, types & classes. Trowbridge, Wiltshire: Redwood Burn. ISBN 0-7153-9381-2.
- Simmons, Jack; Biddle, Gordon, eds. (1997). The Oxford Companion to British railway history. Oxford: Oxford University Press. ISBN 0-19-211697-5.
- Syssoyeva, Kathryn Mederos; Proudfit, Scott, eds. (2013). A History of Collective Creation. New York: Palgrave Macmillan. ISBN 978-1-137-33129-8.
- Walley, Noel (May 2003). "North Staffordshire Railway Passenger Services 1910–1999".
- Report of the Inspecting Officers of the Railway Department to the Lords of the Committee of the Privy Council for Trade upon certain accidents which have occurred on Tye Railways. Board of Trade. 1864.
- Report on the Collision at Congleton Station on 17th February 1899 North Staffordshire Railway. Board of Trade. 1899.
