= Locomotives of the North Staffordshire Railway =

The North Staffordshire Railway built or had constructed for it, approximately 350 locomotives. Until the company established Stoke railway works at Stoke-upon-Trent in 1864, a variety of engineering firms supplied locomotives. The company became more self-reliant as time went on, and by the beginning of the 20th century virtually all new engines were produced at Stoke works.

The North Staffordshire Railway became part of the London, Midland and Scottish Railway (LMS) in 1923 and its locomotives were taken into LMS stock. With the engine standardisation policy of the LMS, under the chairmanship of Sir Josiah Stamp, the relatively small number of NSR locomotives made them obvious candidates for early withdrawal and scrapping. Withdrawals started in 1927, and by April 1939 all locomotives in the capital stock had been withdrawn.

== Standard gauge locomotives ==
NSR original number	1870 number	Wheel arrangement	Class	Builder	Builder no	Built	LMS number 1923	LMS number 1928	LMS power class 1923	LMS power class 1928	Withdrawn	Notes
1	1	2-2-2	—	Sharp Brothers and Company	484	February 1848	—	—	—	—	April 1891	Named Dragon. Rebuilt as a 2-2-2ST 1866.
2	26	2-2-2	—	Sharp Brothers and Company	486	March 1848	—	—	—	—	1882	Rebuilt as a 2-4-0 c.1867.
23	27	2-2-2	—	Sharp Brothers and Company	549	October 1848	—	—	—	—	1883	Rebuilt as a 2-4-0 c.1867.
24	81	2-2-2	—	Sharp Brothers and Company	550	October 1848	—	—	—	—	1882	Rebuilt as a 2-4-0 c.1867.
27	2	2-2-2	—	Sharp Brothers and Company	551	October 1848	—	—	—	—	December 1890	Rebuilt as a 2-2-2ST 1866.
29	29	2-2-2	—	Sharp Brothers and Company	554	November 1848	—	—	—	—	1883	Rebuilt as a 2-4-0 c.1867.
5	—	2-4-0	—	B. Hick and Son	—	1848	—	—	—	—	1868	
6	30	2-4-0	—	B. Hick and Son	—	1848	—	—	—	—	1881	
7	4	2-4-0	—	B. Hick and Son	—	1848	—	—	—	—	1881	Rebuilt as 2-2-2WT 1851.
8	5	2-4-0	—	B. Hick and Son	—	1848	—	—	—	—	1881	Rebuilt as 2-2-2WT 1851.
3	38	2-4-0	—	Jones and Potts	—	1848	—	—	—	—	1874	
4	39	2-4-0	—	Jones and Potts	—	1848	—	—	—	—	1874	
9	31	2-4-0	—	Robert Stephenson and Company	671	1848	—	—	—	—	1879	
10	32	2-4-0	—	Robert Stephenson and Company	672	1848	—	—	—	—	1884	
11	41	2-4-0	—	Robert Stephenson and Company	673	1848	—	—	—	—	1874	
12	46	2-4-0	—	Jones and Potts	—	1848	—	—	—	—	1884	
13	—	2-4-0	—	Robert Stephenson and Company	674	1848	—	—	—	—	1868	
14	44	2-4-0	—	Jones and Potts	—	1848	—	—	—	—	1883	
19	33	2-4-0	—	Robert Stephenson and Company	675	1848	—	—	—	—	1883	
20	42	2-4-0	—	Robert Stephenson and Company	676	1848	—	—	—	—	1874	
22	34	2-4-0	—	Jones and Potts	—	1848	—	—	—	—	1884	
25	45	2-4-0	—	Jones and Potts	—	1848	—	—	—	—	1884	
28	35	2-4-0	—	Robert Stephenson and Company	677	1848	—	—	—	—	1881	
30	6	2-4-0	—	Kitson, Thompson and Hewitson	176	1848	—	—	—	—	1878	Rebuilt as 2-4-0T c.1865.
31	7	2-4-0	—	Kitson, Thompson and Hewitson	177	1848	—	—	—	—	1874	Rebuilt as 2-4-0T c.1865.
32	8	2-4-0	—	Kitson, Thompson and Hewitson	178	1848	—	—	—	—	1878	Rebuilt as 2-4-0T c.1865.
38	40	2-4-0	—	Jones and Potts	—	1848	—	—	—	—	1881	
39	43	2-4-0	—	Jones and Potts	—	1848	—	—	—	—	1883	
40	36	2-4-0	—	Jones and Potts	—	1848	—	—	—	—	1883	
42	37	2-4-0	—	Jones and Potts	—	1848	—	—	—	—	1883	
45	9	2-4-0	—	Kitson, Thompson and Hewitson	179	1849	—	—	—	—	1874	Rebuilt as 2-4-0T c.1865.
46	10	2-4-0	—	Kitson, Thompson and Hewitson	180	1849	—	—	—	—	1874	Rebuilt as 2-4-0T c.1865.
47	11	2-4-0	—	Kitson, Thompson and Hewitson	181	1849	—	—	—	—	1874	Rebuilt as 2-4-0T c.1865.
15	64	0-6-0	—	Vulcan Foundry	279	1848	—	—	—	—	1873	
16	65	0-6-0	—	Vulcan Foundry	280	1848	—	—	—	—	1873	
17	66	0-6-0	—	Vulcan Foundry	281	1848	—	—	—	—	1877	
18	67	0-6-0	—	Vulcan Foundry	282	1848	—	—	—	—	1875	
21	68	0-6-0	—	Vulcan Foundry	283	1848	—	—	—	—	1875	
26	69	0-6-0	—	Vulcan Foundry	284	1848	—	—	—	—	1873	
37	70	0-6-0	—	Vulcan Foundry	285	1848	—	—	—	—	1873	
41	71	0-6-0	—	Vulcan Foundry	286	1849	—	—	—	—	1874	
43	72	0-6-0	—	Vulcan Foundry	287	1849	—	—	—	—	1876	
44	73	0-6-0	—	Vulcan Foundry	288	1850	—	—	—	—	June 1888	
33	76	0-6-0	—	Robert Stephenson and Company	406	1844	—	—	—	—	December 1902	Acquired second hand from Grissell & Peto, contractors, 1848.
34	58	0-6-0	—	Robert Stephenson and Company	422	1844	—	—	—	—	1881	Acquired second hand from Grissell & Peto, contractors, 1848. Rebuilt as 0-6-0ST and renumbered 42 in June 1866.
35	77	0-6-0	—	Robert Stephenson and Company	423	1844	—	—	—	—	December 1902	Acquired second hand from Grissell & Peto, contractors, 1848.
36	59	0-6-0	—	Robert Stephenson and Company	424	1844	—	—	—	—	1880	Acquired second hand from Grissell & Peto, contractors, 1848. Rebuilt as 0-6-0ST June 1866.
48	16	2-4-0	—	Kitson, Thompson and Hewitson	226	1850	—	—	—	—	1884	Rebuilt as a 2-2-2 1851.
49	17	2-4-0	—	Kitson, Thompson and Hewitson	227	1850	—	—	—	—	1882	Rebuilt as a 2-2-2 1851.
50	18	2-4-0	—	Kitson, Thompson and Hewitson	228	1850	—	—	—	—	1882	Rebuilt as a 2-2-2 1851.
51	19	2-4-0	—	Kitson, Thompson and Hewitson	229	1850	—	—	—	—	1871	Rebuilt as a 2-2-2 1851.
52	20	2-4-0	—	Kitson, Thompson and Hewitson	230	1850	—	—	—	—	1883	Rebuilt as a 2-2-2 1851.
53	21	2-4-0	—	Kitson, Thompson and Hewitson	231	1850	—	—	—	—	1882	Rebuilt as a 2-2-2 1851.
54	22	2-2-2	—	Kitson, Thompson and Hewitson	238	1851	—	—	—	—	1886	
55	23	2-2-2	—	Kitson, Thompson and Hewitson	239	1851	—	—	—	—	1886	
56	24	2-2-2	—	Kitson, Thompson and Hewitson	240	1851	—	—	—	—	1886	
57	25	2-2-2	—	Kitson, Thompson and Hewitson	241	1851	—	—	—	—	1882	
58	—	0-6-0	—	Robert Stephenson and Company	678	July 1849	—	—	—	—	1851	Sold to the Midland Railway.
59	—	0-6-0	—	Robert Stephenson and Company	679	July 1849	—	—	—	—	1851	Sold to the Midland Railway.
60	—	0-6-0	—	Robert Stephenson and Company	680	August 1849	—	—	—	—	1851	Sold to the Midland Railway.
61	—	0-6-0	—	Robert Stephenson and Company	681	January 1850	—	—	—	—	1851	Sold to the Midland Railway.
62	—	0-6-0	—	Robert Stephenson and Company	682	December 1849	—	—	—	—	1851	Sold to the Midland Railway.
63	—	0-6-0	—	Robert Stephenson and Company	683	1851	—	—	—	—	1851	Sold to the contractors for the Dutch Rhenish Railway Company.
58	102	0-6-0	—	Kitson, Thompson and Hewitson	316	1853	—	—	—	—	November 1897	
59	103	0-6-0	—	Kitson, Thompson and Hewitson	317	1853	—	—	—	—	1898	
60	60	0-6-0	—	Vulcan Foundry	383	1855	—	—	—	—	1884	Rebuilt as 0-6-0ST 1870.
61	61	0-6-0	—	Vulcan Foundry	384	1855	—	—	—	—	1887	Rebuilt as 0-6-0ST 1870.
62	62	0-6-0	—	Vulcan Foundry	385	1855	—	—	—	—	November 1888	Rebuilt as 0-6-0ST 1870.
63	63	0-6-0	—	Vulcan Foundry	386	1855	—	—	—	—	1884	Rebuilt as 0-6-0ST 1870.
64	100	0-6-0	—	Robert Stephenson and Company	1330	1860	—	—	—	—	October 1896	
66	101	0-6-0	—	Robert Stephenson and Company	1331	1860	—	—	—	—	March 1897	
65	3	2-2-2WT	—	?	—	?	—	—	—	—	1883	Possibly built by Robert Stephenson and Company in 1850. Alternatively possibly purchased from Peto & Leishman, contractors, in 1849.
67	56	0-6-0ST	—	Robert Stephenson and Company	1414	1862	—	—	—	—	March 1888	
68	57	0-6-0ST	—	Robert Stephenson and Company	1415	1862	—	—	—	—	March 1888	
69	78	0-6-0	—	Hudswell Clarke	35	October 1864	—	—	—	—	July 1899	
70	79	0-6-0	—	Hudswell Clarke	36	November 1864	—	—	—	—	December 1898	
71	80	0-6-0	—	Hudswell Clarke	39	January 1865	—	—	—	—	July 1900	
72	81	0-6-0	—	Hudswell Clarke	40	February 1865	—	—	—	—	October 1899	
73	82	0-6-0	—	Hudswell Clarke	43	May 1865	—	—	—	—	June 1907	
74	83	0-6-0	—	Hudswell Clarke	44	June 1865	—	—	—	—	June 1907	
75	84	0-6-0	—	Neilson and Company	1145	1865	—	—	—	—	December 1909	
76	85	0-6-0	—	Neilson and Company	1146	1865	—	—	—	—	December 1909	
77	86	0-6-0	—	Neilson and Company	1147	1865	—	—	—	—	June 1910	
78	87	0-6-0	—	Neilson and Company	1148	1865	—	—	—	—	July 1910	
79	88	0-6-0	—	Neilson and Company	1149	1865	—	—	—	—	December 1909	
80	89	0-6-0	—	Neilson and Company	1150	1865	—	—	—	—	November 1913	
90	90	0-6-0	F (from 1903)	Worcester Engine Company	7	1866	—	—	—	—	December 1910	Allocated to class F after rebuilding.
91	91	0-6-0	F (from 1904)	Worcester Engine Company	8	1867	—	—	—	—	February 1911	Allocated to class F after rebuilding.
92	92	0-6-0	F (from 1901)	Worcester Engine Company	9	1867	—	—	—	—	March 1911	Allocated to class F after rebuilding.
93	93	0-6-0	—	Worcester Engine Company	10	1867	—	—	—	—	June 1909	
94	94	0-6-0	—	Worcester Engine Company	11	1867	—	—	—	—	June 1909	
95	95	0-6-0	F (from 1898)	Worcester Engine Company	12	1867	—	—	—	—	June 1909	Allocated to class F after rebuilding.
96	96	0-6-0	—	Worcester Engine Company	13	1867	—	—	—	—	May 1913	
97	97	0-6-0	F (from 1907)	Worcester Engine Company	14	1867	—	—	—	—	May 1913	Allocated to class F after rebuilding.
98	98	0-6-0	—	Worcester Engine Company	15	1867	—	—	—	—	December 1908	
99	99	0-6-0	—	Worcester Engine Company	16	1867	—	—	—	—	December 1908	
82	51	0-6-0ST	—	Hudswell Clarke	77	June 1866	—	—	—	—	1880	
5	52	0-6-0ST	—	Stoke works	—	1868	—	—	—	—	1879	First locomotive built by the NSR at its own workshops.
13	53	0-6-0ST	—	Stoke works	—	1868	—	—	—	—	1880	
24	54	0-6-0ST	—	Stoke works	—	1868	—	—	—	—	1882	
55	—	0-6-0ST	—	Isaac Dodds and Son	—	1865	—	—	—	—	1882	Acquired in 1870.
74	—	0-6-0	E	Stoke works	—	1871	2320	8650	1	1F	June 1934	Renumbered 74A in 1919.
75	—	0-6-0	E	Stoke works	—	1871	2321	—	1	—	February 1926	Renumbered 75A in 1919.
104	—	0-6-0	E	Vulcan Foundry	642	1872	2322	8651	1	1F	December 1932	
105	—	0-6-0	E	Vulcan Foundry	643	1872	2323	—	1	—	November 1926	
106	—	0-6-0	E	Vulcan Foundry	644	1872	2324	8652	1	1F	November 1932	
107	—	0-6-0	E	Vulcan Foundry	645	1872	2325	—	1	—	June 1927	
108	—	0-6-0	E	Vulcan Foundry	646	1872	2326	8653	1	1F	November 1930	
109	—	0-6-0	E	Vulcan Foundry	647	1872	2327	8654	1	1F	September 1931	
110	—	0-6-0	E	Vulcan Foundry	648	1872	2328	8655	1	1F	December 1929	
111	—	0-6-0	E	Vulcan Foundry	649	1872	2329	8656	1	1F	March 1930	
112	—	0-6-0	E	Vulcan Foundry	650	1872	2330	8657	1	1F	December 1928	
113	—	0-6-0	E	Vulcan Foundry	651	1872	2331	8658	1	1F	December 1928	
118	—	0-6-0	E	Beyer, Peacock and Company	1348	April 1874	2334	—	1	—	August 1927	Renumbered 118A in 1918.
119	—	0-6-0	E	Beyer, Peacock and Company	1349	April 1874	2335	—	1	—	December 1926	Renumbered 119A in 1918.
120	—	0-6-0	E	Beyer, Peacock and Company	1350	April 1874	2336	8659	1	1F	March 1930	Renumbered 120A in 1918.
121	—	0-6-0	E	Beyer, Peacock and Company	1351	April 1874	2337	—	1	—	July 1927	Renumbered 121A in 1918.
122	—	0-6-0	E	Beyer, Peacock and Company	1352	April 1874	2338	8660	1	1F	December 1933	
123	—	0-6-0	E	Beyer, Peacock and Company	1353	May 1874	2339	8661	1	1F	May 1928	
67	—	0-6-0	E	Stoke works	—	1875	2340	8662	1	1F	December 1928	
68	—	0-6-0	E	Stoke works	—	1875	2341	8663	1	1F	May 1928	
72	—	0-6-0	E	Stoke works	—	1876	—	—	—	—	1919	
66	—	0-6-0	E	Stoke works	—	1877	2342	8664	1	1F	November 1930	
19	—	2-4-0	19	Stoke works	—	1871	—	—	—	—	1905	
69	—	0-6-0	69	Sharp, Stewart and Company	2342	1873	—	—	—	—	1922	Renumbered 69A in 1913.
70	—	0-6-0	69	Sharp, Stewart and Company	2343	1873	2332	—	1	—	May 1927	Renumbered 70A in 1914.
64	—	0-6-0	69	Sharp, Stewart and Company	2378	1873	—	—	—	—	1918	Renumbered 64A in 1913.
65	—	0-6-0	69	Sharp, Stewart and Company	2379	1873	—	—	—	—	1919	Renumbered 65A in 1913.
114	—	0-6-0	69	Sharp, Stewart and Company	2424	1874	—	—	—	—	1920	Renumbered 114A in 1916.
115	—	0-6-0	69	Sharp, Stewart and Company	2425	1874	—	—	—	—	1920	Renumbered 115A in 1917.
116	—	0-6-0	69	Sharp, Stewart and Company	2426	1874	2333	—	1	—	September 1926	Renumbered 116A in 1916.
117	—	0-6-0	69	Sharp, Stewart and Company	2427	1874	—	—	—	—	1916	
7	—	2-4-0	7	Stoke works	—	1874	—	—	—	—	1897	Renumbered 7A in 1895.
10	—	2-4-0	7	Stoke works	—	1874	—	—	—	—	December 1894	
71	—	2-4-0	7	Stoke works	—	1874	—	—	—	—	1894	
9	—	2-4-0T	9	Stoke works	—	1874	—	—	—	—	1916	Renumbered 9A in 1907.
11	—	2-4-0T	9	Stoke works	—	1874	—	—	—	—	1916	Renumbered 11A in 1907.
12	—	2-4-0T	9	Sharp, Stewart and Company	2445	1874	—	—	—	—	1916	Rebuilt as 2-4-2T 1899. Renumbered 12A in 1908.
41	—	2-4-0T	9	Sharp, Stewart and Company	2446	1874	—	—	—	—	1916	Rebuilt as 2-4-2T 1899. Renumbered 41A in 1908.
42	—	2-4-0T	9	Sharp, Stewart and Company	2447	1874	—	—	—	—	1916	Rebuilt as 2-4-2T 1899. Renumbered 42A in 1908.
38	—	2-4-0	38 (later C)	Stoke works	—	1874	—	—	—	—	1912	Became Class C after rebuild in 1893.
39	—	2-4-0	38 (later C)	Stoke works	—	1874	—	—	—	—	1912	Became Class C after rebuild in 1892.
13	—	2-4-0	38 (later C)	Dübs and Company	858	1875	—	—	—	—	1912	Became Class C after rebuild in 1893. Renumbered 13A in 1912.
14	—	2-4-0	38 (later C)	Dübs and Company	859	1875	—	—	—	—	1919	Became Class C after rebuild in 1888. Renumbered 14A in 1912.
15	—	2-4-0	38 (later C)	Dübs and Company	860	1875	—	—	—	—	June 1906	Became Class C after rebuild in 1894.
47	—	0-6-0ST	56	Robert Stephenson and Company	2251	1875	—	—	—	—	June 1890	Sold to Madeley Coal & Iron Company.
48	—	0-6-0ST	56	Robert Stephenson and Company	2252	1875	—	—	—	—	June 1887	
49	—	0-6-0ST	56	Robert Stephenson and Company	2253	1875	—	—	—	—	June 1885	
50	—	0-6-0ST	56	Robert Stephenson and Company	2254	1875	—	—	—	—	October 1889	
6	—	2-4-0T	A	Stoke works	—	1878	—	—	—	—	1910	Renumbered 6A in 1910.
8	—	2-4-0T	A	Stoke works	—	1878	—	—	—	—	1914	Renumbered 8A in 1911.
31	—	2-4-0T	A	Stoke works	—	1879	—	—	—	—	1921	Renumbered 31A in 1914.
52	—	2-4-0T	A	Stoke works	—	1879	1454	1454	1	1P	August 1932	Rebuilt as 2-4-2T 1899.
51	—	2-4-0T	A	Stoke works	—	1880	—	—	—	—	1914	Renumbered 51A in 1913.
53	—	2-4-0T	A	Stoke works	—	1880	—	—	—	—	1921	Renumbered 53A in 1914.
35	—	2-4-0T	A	Stoke works	—	1881	1455	1455	1	1P	October 1932	Rebuilt as 2-4-2T 1899.
40	—	2-4-0T	A	Stoke works	—	1881	1456	1456	1	1P	August 1932	Rebuilt as 2-4-2T 1899.
4	—	2-4-0T	B	Stoke works	—	1881	—	—	—	—	1921	Renumbered as 4A in 1915.
5	—	2-4-0T	B	Stoke works	—	1881	—	—	—	—	1922	Renumbered as 5A in 1915.
30	—	2-4-0T	B	Stoke works	—	1881	—	—	—	—	1920	Renumbered 30A in 1914.
17	—	2-4-0T	B	Stoke works	—	1882	1440	1440	1	1P	June 1928	Renumbered 17A in 1920.
18	—	2-4-0T	B	Stoke works	—	1882	1441	1441	1	1P	June 1933	Renumbered 18A in 1921.
21	—	2-4-0T	B	Stoke works	—	1882	1457	1457	1	1P	August 1932	Rebuilt as 2-4-2T 1901.
22	—	2-4-0T	B	Stoke works	—	1882	1442	1442	1	1P	December 1932	Renumbered 22A in 1921. Under the LMS was transferred to the North London Railway for a period of time.
25	—	2-4-0T	B	Stoke works	—	1882	—	—	—	—	1921	Renumbered 25A in 1921.
26	—	2-4-0T	B	Stoke works	—	1882	—	—	—	—	1921	
28	—	2-4-0T	B	Stoke works	—	1882	—	—	—	—	1922	
27	—	2-4-0T	B	Stoke works	—	1883	1443	—	1	—	July 1925	Renumbered 27A in 1922.
29	—	2-4-0T	B	Stoke works	—	1883	1444	1444	1	1P	October 1932	Renumbered 29A in 1921.
24	—	2-4-0T	B	Stoke works	—	1886	1458	1458	1	1P	January 1934	Rebuilt as 2-4-2T 1901.
23	—	2-4-0T	B	Stoke works	—	November 1886	1445	1445	1	1P	June 1928	Renumbered 23A in 1922.
48	—	2-4-0T	B	Stoke works	—	June 1887	1446	1446	1	1P	June 1929	Renumbered 48A in 1923. Under the LMS was transferred to the North London Railway for a period of time.
61	—	2-4-0T	B	Stoke works	—	1887	1459	1459	1	1P	August 1934	Rebuilt as 2-4-2T 1900.
2	—	2-4-0T	B	Stoke works	—	December 1890	1447	1447	1	1P	November 1930	Renumbered 2A in 1923. Under the LMS was transferred to the North London Railway for a period of time.
1	—	2-4-0T	B	Stoke works	—	April 1891	1448	1448	1	1P	November 1930	Renumbered 1A in 1923.
10	—	2-4-0T	B	Stoke works	—	December 1894	1449	—	1	—	February 1928	Renumbered 10A in 1923. Withdrawn before renumbered under 1928 scheme.
71	—	2-4-0T	B	Stoke works	—	June 1894	1450	1450	1	1P	October 1933	Under the LMS was transferred to the North London Railway for a period of time.
7	—	2-4-0T	B	Stoke works	—	June 1895	1451	—	1	—	February 1928	Under the LMS was transferred to the North London Railway for a period of time. Withdrawn before renumbered under 1928 scheme.
58	—	0-6-0ST	ST	Stoke works	—	1881	1600	—	1	—	June 1927	Renumbered 58A in 1899.
59	—	0-6-0ST	ST	Stoke works	—	1880	1601	1601	1	1F	November 1930	Renumbered 59A in 1902.
54	—	2-4-0	C	Stoke works	—	1882	—	—	—	—	1906	Named John Bramley Moore after NSR deputy chairman at time of construction.
55	—	2-4-0	C	Stoke works	—	1882	—	—	—	—	1911	Named Colin Minton Campbell after NSR chairman at time of construction.
45	—	2-4-0	C	Stoke works	—	1884	—	—	—	—	1911	
46	—	2-4-0	C	Stoke works	—	1884	—	—	—	—	1911	
3	—	0-6-0T	D	Stoke works	—	1883	1550	1550	2	2F	September 1930	
20	—	0-6-0T	D	Stoke works	—	1883	1551	1551	2	2F	December 1931	
33	—	0-6-0T	D	Stoke works	—	1883	1552	1552	2	2F	October 1929	
36	—	0-6-0T	D	Stoke works	—	1883	1553	1553	2	2F	September 1935	
37	—	0-6-0T	D	Stoke works	—	1883	1554	1554	2	2F	October 1931	
43	—	0-6-0T	D	Stoke works	—	1883	1555	1555	2	2F	October 1931	
44	—	0-6-0T	D	Stoke works	—	1883	1556	1556	2	2F	November 1931	
16	—	0-6-0T	D	Stoke works	—	1884	1557	1557	2	2F	August 1936	
32	—	0-6-0T	D	Stoke works	—	1884	1558	1558	2	2F	January 1929	
34	—	0-6-0T	D	Stoke works	—	1884	1559	1559	2	2F	November 1930	
60	—	0-6-0T	D	Stoke works	—	1884	1560	1560	2	2F	April 1928	
63	—	0-6-0T	D	Stoke works	—	1884	1561	1561	2	2F	September 1929	
49	—	0-6-0T	D	Stoke works	—	June 1885	1562	1562	2	2F	February 1931	
62	—	0-6-0T	D	Stoke works	—	November 1885	1563	1563	2	2F	September 1929	
124	—	0-6-0T	D	Stoke works	—	June 1885	1564	1564	2	2F	June 1932	Renumbered 124A in 1904.
125	—	0-6-0T	D	Stoke works	—	December 1885	1565	1565	2	2F	January 1928	Renumbered 125A in 1904.
126	—	0-6-0T	D	Stoke works	—	June 1886	1566	1566	2	2F	December 1931	
127	—	0-6-0T	D	Stoke works	—	November 1886	1567	1567	2	2F	September 1937	
128	—	0-6-0T	D	Stoke works	—	June 1887	1568	1568	2	2F	April 1928	
129	—	0-6-0T	D	Stoke works	—	November 1887	1569	1569	2	2F	December 1931	
57	—	0-6-0T	D	Stoke works	—	October 1888	1570	1570	2	2F	December 1937	
73	—	0-6-0T	D	Stoke works	—	June 1888	1571	1571	2	2F	August 1929	
50	—	0-6-0T	D	Stoke works	—	October 1889	1572	1572	2	2F	December 1931	
56	—	0-6-0T	D	Stoke works	—	May 1889	1573	1573	2	2F	May 1929	
47	—	0-6-0T	D	Stoke works	—	March 1890	1574	1574	2	2F	June 1929	
130	—	0-6-0T	D	Stoke works	—	June 1891	1575	1575	2	2F	August 1929	
131	—	0-6-0T	D	Stoke works	—	October 1891	1576	1576	2	2F	December 1936	
132	—	0-6-0T	D	Stoke works	—	December 1891	1577	1577	2	2F	June 1929	
133	—	0-6-0T	D	Stoke works	—	March 1892	1578	1578	2	2F	January 1930	
134	—	0-6-0T	D	Stoke works	—	June 1892	1579	1579	2	2F	May 1934	
135	—	0-6-0T	D	Stoke works	—	September 1892	1580	1580	2	2F	October 1931	
136	—	0-6-0T	D	Stoke works	—	December 1892	1581	1581	2	2F	September 1928	
137	—	0-6-0T	D	Stoke works	—	March 1893	1582	1582	2	2F	January 1929	
138	—	0-6-0T	D	Stoke works	—	June 1893	1583	1583	2	2F	August 1936	
139	—	0-6-0T	D	Stoke works	—	September 1893	1584	1584	2	2F	June 1934	
140	—	0-6-0T	D	Stoke works	—	December 1893	1585	1585	2	2F	November 1930	
141	—	0-6-0T	D	Stoke works	—	March 1894	1586	1586	2	2F	October 1931	
142	—	0-6-0T	D	Stoke works	—	September 1894	1587	1587	2	2F	January 1929	
143	—	0-6-0T	D	Stoke works	—	March 1895	1588	—	2	—	November 1927	
144	—	0-6-0T	D	Stoke works	—	October 1895	1589	1589	2	2F	September 1935	
145	—	0-6-0T	D	Stoke works	—	December 1895	1590	1590	2	2F	December 1930	
146	—	0-6-0T	D	Stoke works	—	March 1896	1591	1591	2	2F	April 1932	
147	—	0-6-0T	D	Stoke works	—	June 1896	1592	1592	2	2F	August 1931	
148	—	0-6-0T	D	Stoke works	—	December 1896	1593	1593	2	2F	December 1931	
149	—	0-6-0T	D	Stoke works	—	May 1897	1594	1594	2	2F	March 1930	
150	—	0-6-0T	D	Stoke works	—	September 1897	1595	1595	2	2F	June 1932	
151	—	0-6-0T	D	Stoke works	—	March 1898	1596	1596	2	2F	April 1932	
152	—	0-6-0T	D	Stoke works	—	October 1898	1597	1597	2	2F	August 1936	
153	—	0-6-0T	D	Stoke works	—	April 1899	1598	1598	2	2F	October 1929	
100	—	0-6-0	100	Stoke works	—	October 1896	2347	8669	2	2F	September 1931	
101	—	0-6-0	100	Stoke works	—	March 1897	2348	8670	2	2F	December 1928	
102	—	0-6-0	100	Stoke works	—	November 1897	2349	8671	2	2F	April 1929	
103	—	0-6-0	100	Stoke works	—	June 1898	2350	8672	2	2F	December 1928	
79	—	0-6-0	100	Stoke works	—	December 1898	2344	8666	2	2F	September 1929	
78	—	0-6-0	100	Stoke works	—	July 1899	2346	8668	2	2F	September 1931	
81	—	0-6-0	100	Stoke works	—	October 1899	2343	8665	2	2F	December 1928	
80	—	0-6-0	100	Stoke works	—	July 1900	2345	8667	2	2F	April 1929	
82	—	0-6-0	New 100	Stoke works	—	June 1907	2357	8679	2	2F	September 1929	
83	—	0-6-0	New 100	Stoke works	—	June 1907	2358	8680	2	2F	December 1928	
58	—	0-6-2T	DX	Stoke works	—	December 1899	2234	2234	2	2F	November 1929	
154	—	0-6-2T	DX	Stoke works	—	March 1900	2235	2235	2	2F	March 1929	
155	—	0-6-2T	DX	Stoke works	—	December 1900	2236	2236	2	2F	July 1929	
156	—	0-6-2T	DX	Stoke works	—	May 1902	2238	2238	2	2F	September 1931	
157	—	0-6-2T	DX	Stoke works	—	December 1902	2239	—	2	—	November 1927	
158	—	0-6-2T	DX	Stoke works	—	September 1902	2237	2237	2	2F	June 1929	
114A	—	0-6-0	Special DX	Crewe works	513	October 1861	—	—	—	—	1913	Purchased April 1900 from LNWR. Previously LNWR 3496.
115A	—	0-6-0	Special DX	Crewe works	1261	April 1869	—	—	—	—	1915	Purchased April 1900 from LNWR. Previously LNWR 3404.
116A	—	0-6-0	Special DX	Crewe works	431	March 1860	—	—	—	—	1914	Purchased May 1900 from LNWR. Previously LNWR 3399.
117A	—	0-6-0	Special DX	Crewe works	569	August 1862	—	—	—	—	1914	Purchased May 1900 from LNWR. Previously LNWR 3402.
159	—	0-6-0	159	Nasmyth Wilson	588	December 1900	2351	8673	2	2F	October 1936	
160	—	0-6-0	159	Nasmyth Wilson	589	December 1900	2352	8674	2	2F	November 1933	
161	—	0-6-0	159	Nasmyth Wilson	590	December 1900	2353	8675	2	2F	February 1936	
162	—	0-6-0	159	Nasmyth Wilson	591	December 1900	2354	8676	2	2F	August 1929	
163	—	0-6-0	159	Nasmyth Wilson	592	December 1900	2355	8677	2	2F	September 1936	
164	—	0-6-0	159	Nasmyth Wilson	593	December 1900	2356	8678	2	2F	March 1934	
165	—	0-6-2T	L	Vulcan Foundry	1891	December 1903	2242	2242	3	3F	August 1935	
166	—	0-6-2T	L	Vulcan Foundry	1892	December 1903	2243	2243	3	3F	January 1933	
167	—	0-6-2T	L	Vulcan Foundry	1893	December 1903	2244	2244	3	3F	May 1935	
168	—	0-6-2T	L	Vulcan Foundry	1894	December 1903	2245	2245	3	3F	August 1934	
169	—	0-6-2T	L	Vulcan Foundry	1895	November 1903	2241	2241	3	3F	February 1936	Renumbered 125 in 1904.
170	—	0-6-2T	L	Vulcan Foundry	1896	November 1903	2240	2240	3	3F	September 1935	Renumbered 124 in 1904.
R.M.1	—	0-2-2T	Railmotor	Beyer, Peacock and Company	4643	June 1905	—	—	—	—	June 1927	Not allocated LMS number or power classification.
R.M.2	—	0-2-2T	Railmotor	Beyer, Peacock and Company	4644	June 1905	—	—	—	—	June 1927	Not allocated LMS number or power classification.
R.M.3	—	0-2-2T	Railmotor	Beyer, Peacock and Company	4793	December 1905	—	—	—	—	June 1927	Not allocated LMS number or power classification.
19	—	2-4-0	19	Stoke works	—	July 1905	—	—	—	—	1920	
15	—	2-4-0	19	Stoke works	—	June 1906	—	—	—	—	1920	
54	—	2-4-0	19	Stoke works	—	1906	—	—	—	—	1920	Last 2-4-0 built for a standard gauge railway in England.
9	—	0-4-4T	M	Stoke works	—	December 1907	1431	1431	3	3P	January 1936	
11	—	0-4-4T	M	Stoke works	—	December 1907	1432	1432	3	3P	October 1935	
12	—	0-4-4T	M	Stoke works	—	January 1908	1433	1433	3	3P	October 1935	
41	—	0-4-4T	M	Stoke works	—	March 1908	1434	1434	3	3P	March 1939	
42	—	0-4-4T	M	Stoke works	—	March 1908	1435	1435	3	3P	August 1930	
98	—	0-6-2T	New L	Stoke works	—	December 1908	2246	2246	3	3F	May 1936	
99	—	0-6-2T	New L	Stoke works	—	December 1908	2247	2247	3	3F	February 1928	
156	—	0-6-2T	New L	Stoke works	—	November 1908	2248	2248	3	3F	June 1937	
157	—	0-6-2T	New L	Stoke works	—	November 1908	2249	2249	3	3F	March 1936	
93	—	0-6-2T	New L	Stoke works	—	June 1909	2250	2250	3	3F	July 1934	
94	—	0-6-2T	New L	Stoke works	—	June 1909	2251	2251	3	3F	July 1936	
95	—	0-6-2T	New L	Stoke works	—	June 1909	2252	2252	3	3F	April 1934	
158	—	0-6-2T	New L	Stoke works	—	June 1909	2253	2253	3	3F	March 1936	Sold to the Longmoor Military Railway.
51	—	0-6-2T	New L	Stoke works	—	April 1913	2254	2254	3	3F	April 1934	
64	—	0-6-2T	New L	Stoke works	—	November 1913	2255	2255	3	3F	May 1936	
65	—	0-6-2T	New L	Stoke works	—	November 1913	2256	2256	3	3F	May 1935	
69	—	0-6-2T	New L	Stoke works	—	November 1913	2257	2257	3	3F	May 1937	Sold to Manchester Collieries
89	—	0-6-2T	New L	Stoke works	—	November 1913	2258	2258	3	3F	June 1934	
96	—	0-6-2T	New L	Stoke works	—	May 1913	2259	2259	3	3F	October 1936	
97	—	0-6-2T	New L	Stoke works	—	May 1913	2260	2260	3	3F	June 1934	
172	—	0-6-2T	New L	Stoke works	—	June 1913	2261	2261	3	3F	February 1937	
72	—	0-6-2T	New L	Stoke works	—	1920	2262	2262	3	3F	January 1937	Sold to Manchester Collieries
18	—	0-6-2T	New L	Stoke works	—	1921	2263	2263	3	3F	October 1936	
22	—	0-6-2T	New L	Stoke works	—	1921	2264	2264	3	3F	June 1936	Sold to Manchester Collieries
25	—	0-6-2T	New L	Stoke works	—	1921	2265	2265	3	3F	July 1936	
26	—	0-6-2T	New L	Stoke works	—	1921	2266	2266	3	3F	December 1936	
29	—	0-6-2T	New L	Stoke works	—	1921	2267	2267	3	3F	April 1935	
27	—	0-6-2T	New L	Stoke works	—	1922	2268	2268	3	3F	January 1936	
28	—	0-6-2T	New L	Stoke works	—	1922	2269	2269	3	3F	December 1934	Came into service after grouping.
1	—	0-6-2T	New L	Stoke works	—	1923	2270	2270	3	3F	October 1937	Came into service after grouping. Sold to Manchester Collieries.
2	—	0-6-2T	New L	Stoke works	—	1923	2271	2271	3	3F	October 1937	See notes section below (Note: Came into service after grouping. Sold to Manchester Collieries. Last NSR locomotive of any kind to remain in service, subsequently preserved as part of the National Railway Museum collection. From 2016 in the care of the Foxfield Railway Trust and in storage with a view to restoration at the Foxfield Railway.)
10	—	0-6-2T	New L	Stoke works	—	1923	2272	2272	3	3F	July 1935	Came into service after grouping.
48	—	0-6-2T	New L	Stoke works	—	1923	2273	2273	3	3F	February 1937	Came into service after grouping.
84	—	0-6-0	H	Stoke works	—	December 1909	2359	8681	3	3F	January 1930	
85	—	0-6-0	H	Stoke works	—	December 1909	2360	8682	3	3F	May 1929	
88	—	0-6-0	H	Stoke works	—	December 1909	2361	8683	3	3F	May 1928	
169	—	0-6-0	H	Stoke works	—	December 1909	2362	8684	3	3F	November 1928	
86	—	4-4-0	G	Stoke works	—	June 1910	595	5410	3	3P	April 1929	
170	—	4-4-0	G	Stoke works	—	June 1910	597	5412	3	3P	December 1928	
171	—	4-4-0	G	Stoke works	—	July 1910	598	5413	3	3P	May 1933	
87	—	4-4-0	G	Stoke works	—	July 1910	596	5411	3	3P	June 1929	
6	—	0-6-0	H1	Stoke works	—	December 1910	2363	8685	3	3F	January 1929	
90	—	0-6-0	H1	Stoke works	—	December 1910	2364	8686	3	3F	December 1929	
91	—	0-6-0	H1	Stoke works	—	February 1911	2365	8687	3	3F	January 1930	
92	—	0-6-0	H1	Stoke works	—	March 1911	2366	8688	3	3F	October 1930	
8	—	4-4-2T	K	Stoke works	—	November 1911	2180	2180	3	3P	December 1933	
45	—	4-4-2T	K	Stoke works	—	November 1911	2181	2181	3	3P	January 1934	
46	—	4-4-2T	K	Stoke works	—	December 1911	2182	2182	3	3P	January 1934	
55	—	4-4-2T	K	Stoke works	—	December 1911	2183	2183	3	3P	December 1933	
13	—	4-4-2T	K	Stoke works	—	June 1912	2184	2184	3	3P	May 1935	
14	—	4-4-2T	K	Stoke works	—	June 1912	2185	2185	3	3P	December 1933	
39	—	4-4-2T	K	Stoke works	—	September 1912	2186	2186	3	3P	December 1933	
38	—	4-4-0	KT	Stoke works	—	October 1912	599	5414	3	3P	August 1928	
30	—	0-6-4T	New C	Stoke works	—	July 1914	2040	2040	5	5F	April 1934	
31	—	0-6-4T	New C	Stoke works	—	July 1914	2041	2041	5	5F	March 1935	
53	—	0-6-4T	New C	Stoke works	—	August 1914	2042	2042	5	5F	May 1935	
70	—	0-6-4T	New C	Stoke works	—	September 1914	2043	2043	5	5F	October 1935	
173	—	0-6-4T	New C	Stoke works	—	December 1914	2044	2044	5	5F	March 1936	
174	—	0-6-4T	New C	Stoke works	—	December 1914	2045	2045	5	5F	May 1934	
4	—	0-6-4T	New C	Stoke works	—	April 1915	2046	2046	5	5F	November 1937	
5	—	0-6-4T	New C	Stoke works	—	April 1915	2047	2047	5	5F	March 1934	
114	—	0-6-4T	New F	Stoke works	—	October 1916	2048	2048	4	4P	July 1934	
116	—	0-6-4T	New F	Stoke works	—	October 1916	2050	2050	4	4P	February 1935	
117	—	0-6-4T	New F	Stoke works	—	December 1916	2051	2051	4	4P	November 1935	
115	—	0-6-4T	New F	Stoke works	—	February 1917	2049	2049	4	4P	July 1934	
118	—	0-6-4T	New F	Stoke works	—	1918	2052	2052	4	4P	October 1936	
119	—	0-6-4T	New F	Stoke works	—	1918	2053	2053	4	4P	April 1935	
120	—	0-6-4T	New F	Stoke works	—	1919	2054	2054	4	4P	January 1936	
121	—	0-6-4T	New F	Stoke works	—	1919	2055	2055	4	4P	August 1934	
1	—	Bo	Battery Electric	Stoke works	—	1917	—	—	—	—	March 1963	See notes section below (Note: Not allocated LMS number or power classification. Considered to be part of the departmental stock by the LMS. Renumbered BEL 2 by British Railways. Last NSR locomotive of any kind to remain in service, now preserved as part of the National Railway Museum collection.)
74	—	0-6-0T	KS	Kerr, Stuart and Company	4079	1919	1602	1602	1	1F	October 1932	
75	—	0-6-0T	KS	Kerr, Stuart and Company	4080	1919	1603	1603	1	1F	April 1933	
15	—	0-4-4T	New M	Stoke works	—	1920	1436	1436	3	3P	April 1939	Last NSR engine in capital stock to be withdrawn.
17	—	0-4-4T	New M	Stoke works	—	1920	1437	1437	3	3P	July 1935	
19	—	0-4-4T	New M	Stoke works	—	1920	1438	1438	3	3P	January 1936	
54	—	0-4-4T	New M	Stoke works	—	1920	1439	1439	3	3P	1931	
23	—	0-6-0T	4 Cylinder D	Stoke works	—	1922	2367	8689	3	3P	December 1928	Originally allocated LMS number 1599 but rebuilt as 0-6-0 and renumbered 2367

Engines renumbered with "A" as a suffix to the number were said to be on the duplicate list. The duplicate list comprised engines coming towards the end of their working lives and allowed the numbers to be freed up for use by new stock and in many cases to allow classes of new engines to be numbered in consecutive series.

== Narrow gauge locomotives ==
Number	Name	Wheel arrangement	Gauge	Builder	Builder no	Built	Withdrawn	Notes
—	Frog	0-4-0ST	3 ft 6 in (1,067 mm)	H. Hughes & Co	—	1877	May 1936	Operated the tramway at Caldon Low Quarries, the quarries were owned by the NSR.
—	Toad	0-4-0ST	3 ft 6 in (1,067 mm)	H. Hughes & Co	—	1877	May 1936	Operated the tramway at Caldon Low Quarries, the quarries were owned by the NSR.
—	Bobs	0-4-0ST	3 ft 6 in (1,067 mm)	W. G. Bagnall	—	August 1901	May 1936	Operated the tramway at Caldon Low Quarries, the quarries were owned by the NSR.
1	E. R. Calthrop	2-6-4T	2 ft 6 in (762 mm)	Kitson and Company	4258	June 1904	December 1936	Built for the Leek and Manifold Valley Light Railway operated by the NSR. E. R. Calthrop was the engineer of the line. First locomotives of this wheel arrangement to run in Britain.
2	J. B. Earle	2-6-4T	2 ft 6 in (762 mm)	Kitson and Company	4257	May 1904	February 1935	Built for the Leek and Manifold Valley Light Railway. J. B. Earle was the resident engineer of the line.

== Preservation ==
Preserved NSR locomotives
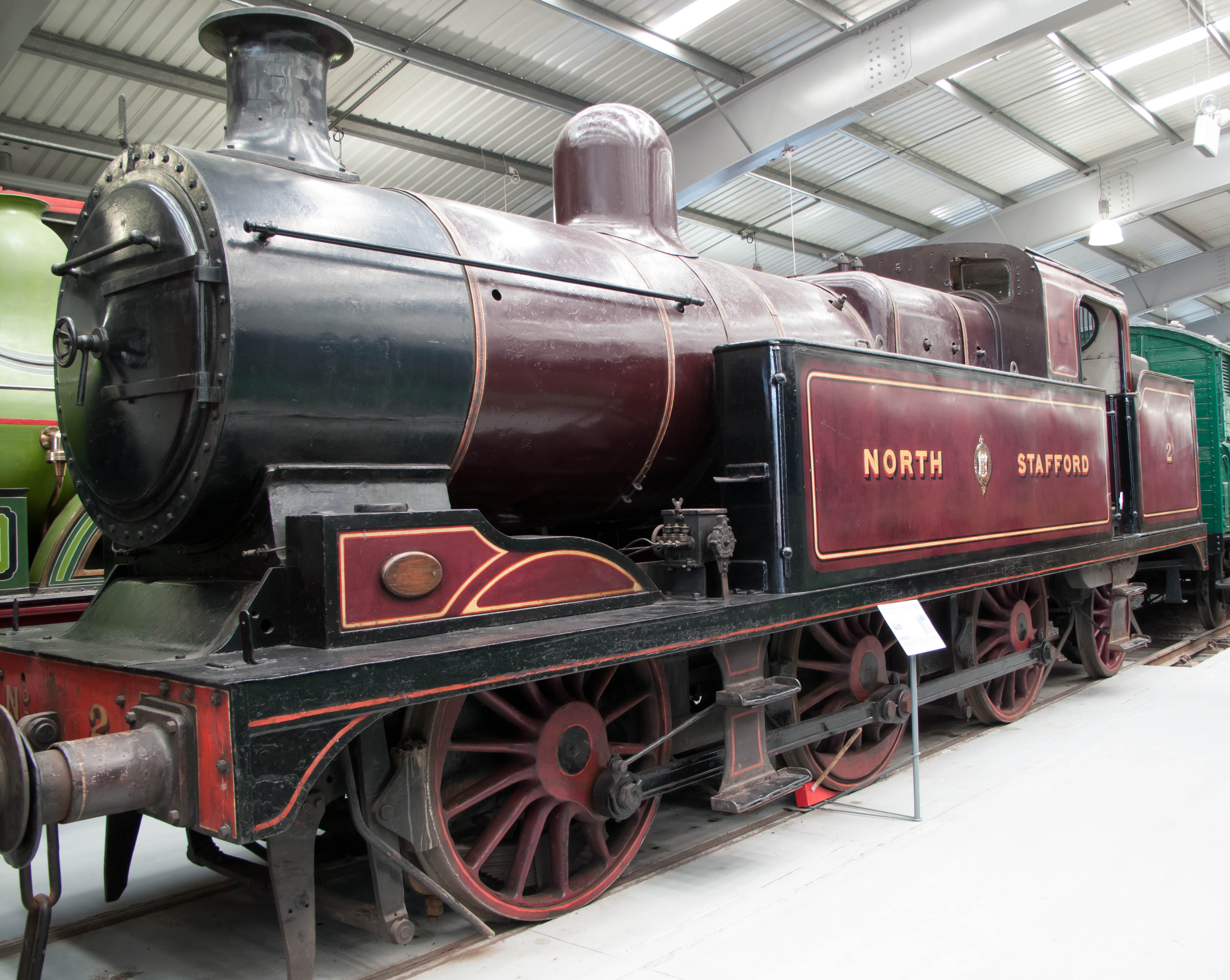
North Staffordshire steam loco No. 2

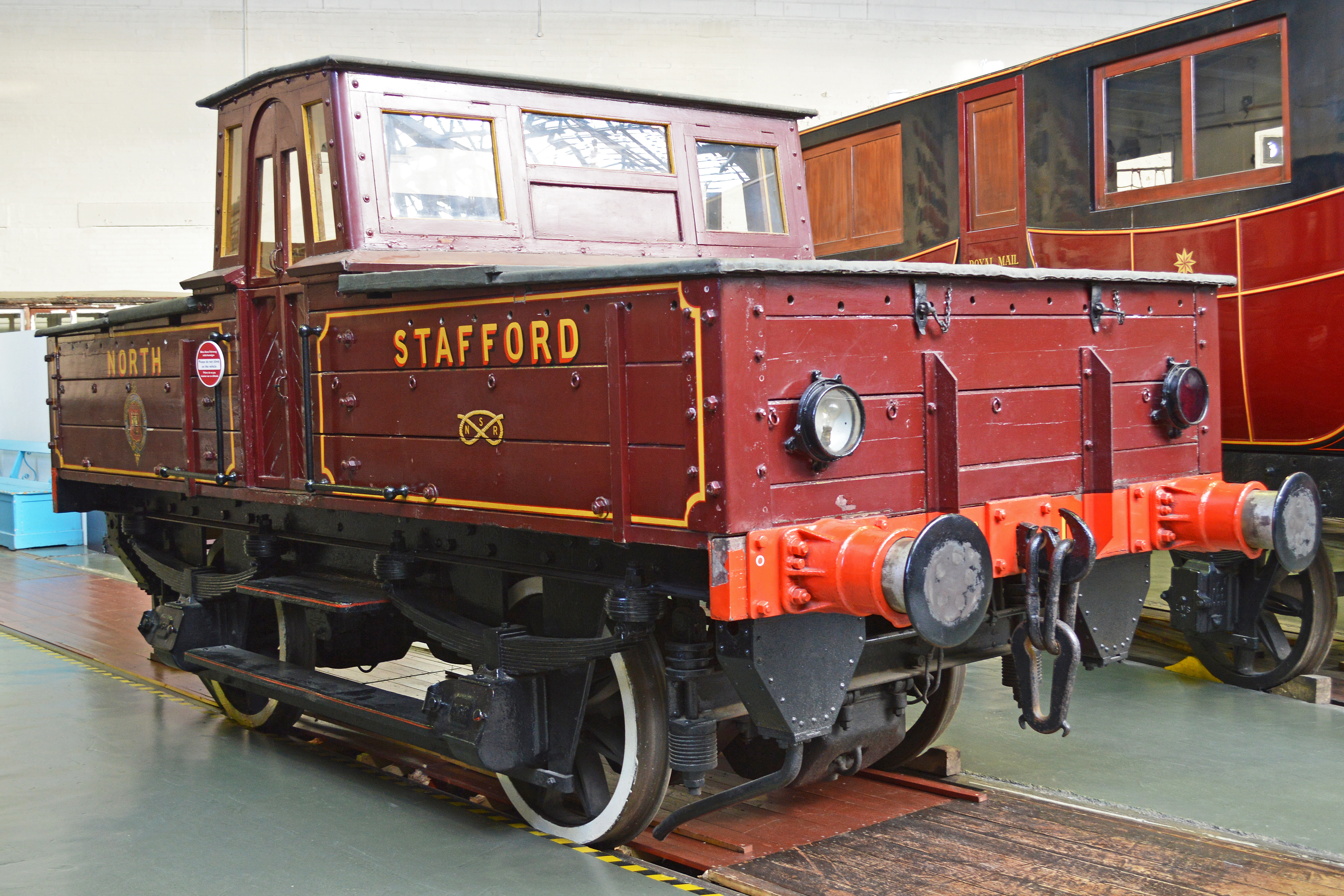
North Staffordshire battery loco No. 1

Two NSR locomotives are preserved. NSR No. 2, an 0-6-2T New L class (one of the four constructed in 1923) and the battery electric locomotive. Both formed part of the national collection at the National Railway Museum until 2016 when ownership of the New L class locomotive was transferred to the Foxfield Railway.. As of 2026 the battery electric locomotive was at the Locomotion Museum in Shildon.
