= Caverswall Road railway station =

Railway station in Staffordshire, England

Caverswall Road
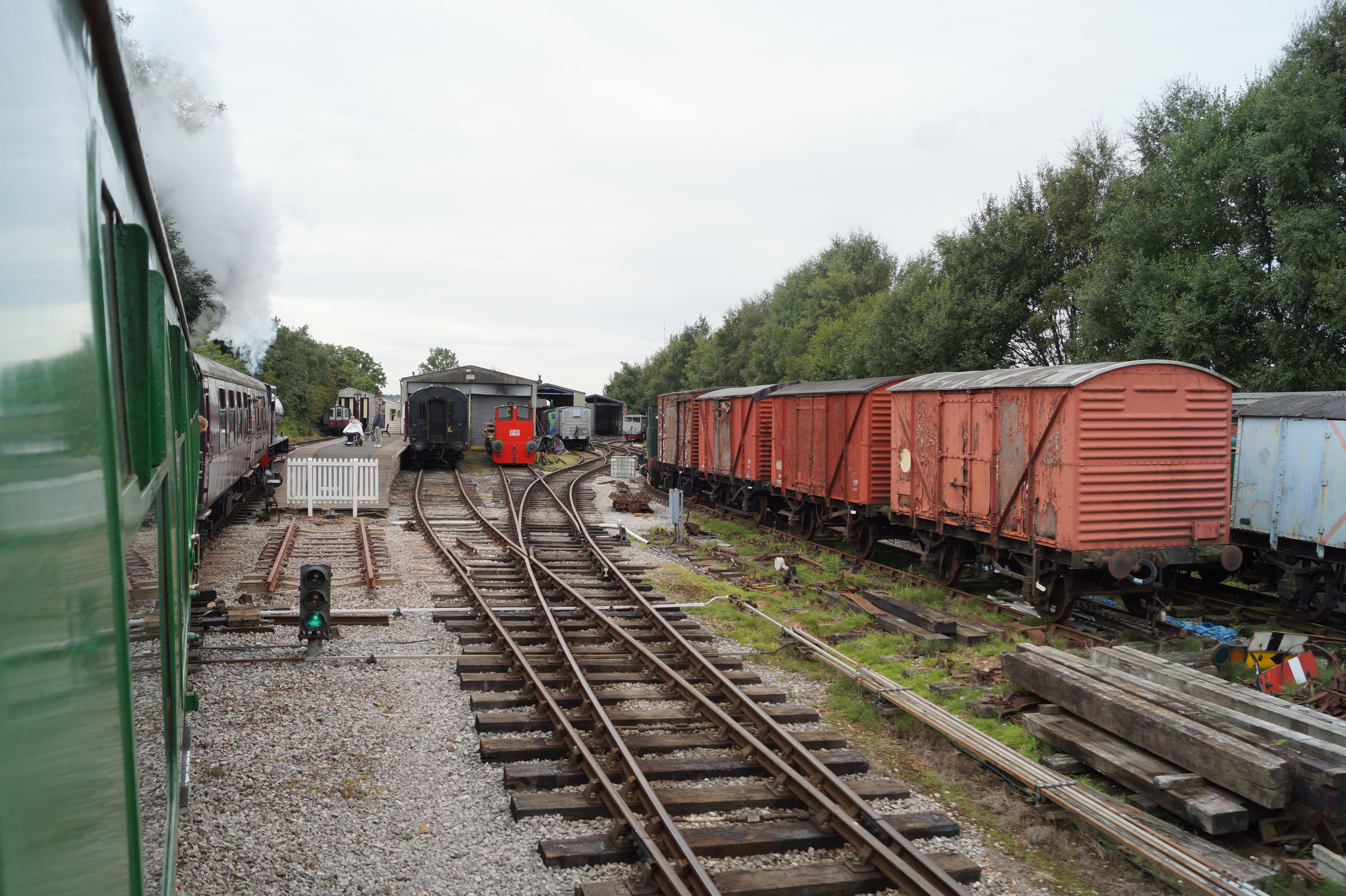

General information
- Location: Blythe Bridge, Staffordshire; England
- Coordinates: 52°58′32.00″N 2°3′54.00″W
- Grid reference: SJ 957420
- System: Station on heritage railway
- Manager: Foxfield Railway
- Platforms: 1
Location

Caverswall Road railway station is a heritage railway station on the Foxfield Railway in Staffordshire. It serves as the centre of the railway's operations. Since the Foxfield Railway is a former industrial railway, there were no passenger stations on the line originally.

== The Foxfield Light Railway Society ==
The society was formed in 1967 to preserve any railway artifacts irrespective of their origins and to operate them on the line that originally connected the former Foxfield Colliery in Dilhorne, Staffordshire, with the Stoke on Trent to Derby line of the former North Staffordshire Railway at Blythe Bridge.

The society became a company, limited by guarantee in 1972. It was granted charitable status by the Inland Revenue at that time. It has no shareholders and each Full Member has a liability limited to £5.

From January 2009 it has been registered with the Charity Commissioners as a registered charity in its own right and as a former constitution.

In 1995 after 28 years of operation, the company was awarded a light railway order, the Foxfield Light Railway Order 1995 (SI 1995/1236) under the Light Railways Act 1896. This gave it statutary powers as defined in the order to build and operate a railway and buildings. Before this time it had simply taken over the "grandfather rights" of its former owners. An important reference in the order is to the Railways Clauses Consolidation Act 1845. This empowers the company to erect such buildings and structures as necessary for the operation of its line, without having to seek planning permission from the local authority.

The company has operated on a volunteer basis since 1967, but some paid staff also work.

== History of the line ==
The line is standard gauge (4.708 feet (1,435 mm)) and was originally constructed in 1893, with left-over materials from the North Staffordshire Railway, over part of a route intended to join the market town of Cheadle (North Staffordshire) and its collieries with the North Staffordshire Stoke to Derby line at Blythe Bridge. This line was never completed over the current route and the Foxfield Colliery Company built the line itself over private land. Historically it appears that some of the line near the colliery was laid on the path of a former plateway or tramway.

The line crosses two public roads, one using an under bridge, the other on the level. It was these crossings which ultimately defined that the LRO would be required in order to comply with the Transport and Works Act, 1992.

The characteristic features are its many steep gradients and sharp curves. These are unique amongst heritage lines and it is these features which also provide it with operational difficulties and skill needs. Gradients on the line range from 1:950 to 1:19 making it one of the steepest heritage railways in the country.
