= NSR New L Class =

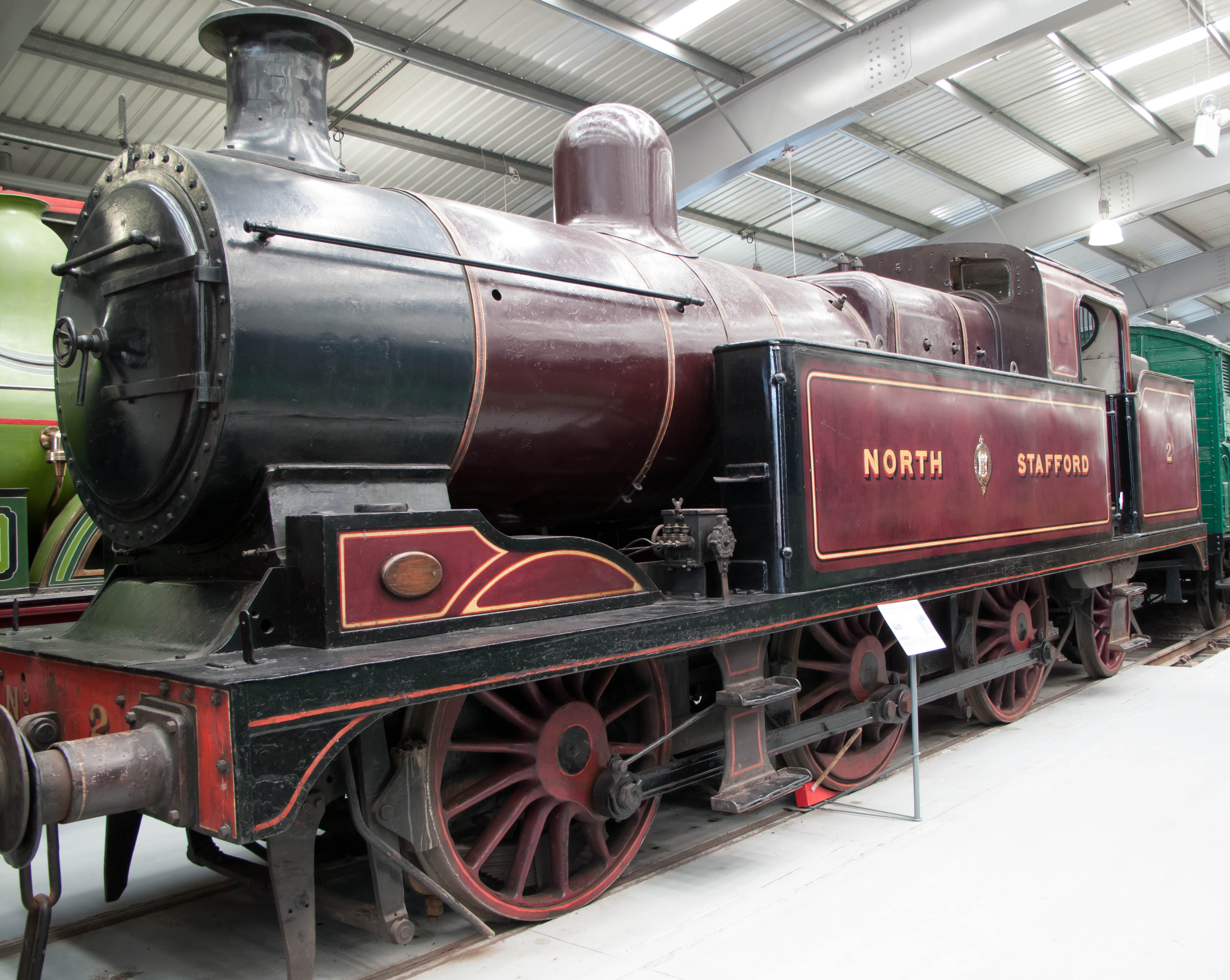
- NSR New L class No. 2 at National Railway Museum Shildon.
Type and origin
- Power type: Steam
- Designer: John Henry Adams
- Builder: NSR Stoke works
- Build date: 1908–1923
- Total produced: 28
Specifications
- Configuration
  - Whyte: 0-6-2T
  - UIC: C1
- Gauge: 4 ft 8 1/2 in (1,435 mm)
- Driver dia.: 5 ft 0 in (1,524 mm)
- Trailing dia.: 4 ft 0 in (1,219 mm)
- Wheelbase: 23 ft 0 in (7.01 m)
- Length: 35 ft 0 in (10.67 m)
- Height: 12 ft 10 in (3.91 m)
- Loco weight: 59 long tons 15 cwt (133,800 lb or 60.7 t) full
- Fuel type: Coal
- Fuel capacity: 3 long tons 10 cwt (7,800 lb or 3.6 t)
- Water cap.: 1,700 imp gal (7,700 L; 2,000 US gal)
- Firebox
  - Grate area: 17.8 sq ft (1.65 m^{2})
- Boiler pressure: 175 psi (1.21 MPa)
- Heating surface
  - Firebox: 108.3 sq ft (10.06 m^{2})
  - Tubes and flues: 1,011.7 sq ft (93.99 m^{2})
- Superheater
  - Heating area: 261 sq ft (24.2 m^{2})
- Cylinders: Two, inside
- Cylinder size: 18 1/2 in × 26 in (470 mm × 660 mm)
Career
- Operators: North Staffordshire Railway; London, Midland and Scottish Railway
- Class: NSR: New L Class
- Power class: 3F
- Number in class: 28
- Retired: February 1928 – October 1937
- Disposition: 1 preserved, remainder scrapped

The North Staffordshire Railway (NSR) New L Class was a class of 0-6-2T steam locomotives designed by John H. Adams, third son of William Adams. They were designed as a development as the previous L Class, adding a boiler common to the M Class and differed from the L Class with, amongst other things higher bunker sides and new cab roofs, and the abandonment of the cast safety valve cover. 28 were built between 1908 and 1923, with the final four constructed under the auspices of the newly formed LMS with the whole class withdrawn by the end of 1937. There is one survivor.

The class were built at the NSR's Stoke works in four batches with a number of differences in weight, grate area and heating surfaces. Those built in 1913 had saturated Belpaire boilers identical to those on the H1 Class of 0-6-0s. The final batch had slightly fewer boiler tubes and did not have condensers nor lagging on the side tanks. in 1921 numbers 18 and 93 were experimentally converted to oil burning.

Although built primarily as a goods tank engine, it proved its worth on passenger trains as well and became an ideal mixed traffic tank locomotive. After grouping they travelled much further than any other NSR class, and thus became one of the most well known from the NSR.

All entered the London, Midland and Scottish Railway (LMS) stock upon formation in 1923, although with the LMS policy of standardisation, many NSR classes were prime targets for early scrapping due to the small size of the classes. As a result, all were withdrawn by the end of 1937. One was sold to the Longmoor Military Railway whilst five more were sold to Manchester Collieries Ltd. The rest were scrapped.

The livery of the 'New L' Class was NSR Madder Lake with straw lining, and NORTH STAFFORD lettering on the side tanks along with the company crest. the number appeared on the bunker. In LMS service, some members of the class merely had the North Staffordshire lettering removed and the first few through the works received their new LMS number in NSR style. However, soon enough they received the standard plain black freight livery with large numerals on the side tanks. Those sold to Manchester Collieries carried their standard livery of plain black with red lining.

NSR No 2 was one of the five "New L" locos sold to Manchester Collieries in Walkden by the LMS in October 1937 under its LMS identity of 2271. The loco was named "Princess" in 1938, and was eventually rebuilt with a new saturated boiler plus new tanks, bunker and cylinders in 1946. In 1960 the locomotive was repainted as NSR No 2 for the "North Staffordshire Railway Centenary" exhibition in Stoke-on-Trent. Following the engine's appearance at this rail event it kept its identity as NSR No 2 upon its return to industrial service at Walkden.

In 1964 the boiler, tanks and cab from "Princess" were fitted onto the chassis of another former NSR New L engine - NSR No. 72 (LMS No. 2262) built in 1920 - subsequently named "Sir Robert" at Walkden). The NSR No 2 identity was maintained, however, and upon the end of service at Walkden the engine was saved by Staffordshire County Council and placed on display at their Shugborough Hall museum.

In 1984 it was moved to Chatterley Whitfield mining museum, for storage out of public view, before being donated to the National collection as the final surviving NSR steam locomotive. With the mining museum closing in 1993, No 2 was placed on display at the Churnet Valley Railway's Cheddleton museum where investigation work was made to restore the locomotive to service. A shortage of funds and lack of technical ability at the time saw the locomotive eventually leave Cheddleton, and it was to eventually find its way onto display at NRM Shildon. In April 2016, it was delisted from the National Collection, and donated to the Foxfield Railway near Stoke on Trent for display and eventual overhaul which is where it currently resides.

There has been a high level of debate over No 2's true identity, as traditionally locomotives took their numbers from their frames which would make the surviving loco NSR no. 72. As 'New L' class all had superheated boilers, the fact the engine survives with a saturated boiler takes the discussion much further as to whether it can even be classed as a NSR locomotive.

The original chassis of No 2 received a new boiler plus the bunker and tanks from NSR No 69 (named "King George VI") at Walkden in 1965, before this locomotive itself was scrapped in 1969 despite attempts to preserve it.

== List of locomotives ==
NSR number	Built	LMS number	Withdrawn	Notes
98	Dec 1908	2246	May 1936	
99	Dec 1908	2247	Feb 1928	
156	Nov 1908	2248	Jun 1937	
157	Nov 1908	2249	Mar 1936	
93	Jun 1909	2250	Jul 1934	Experimentally converted to oil firing in 1921
94	Jun 1909	2251	Jul 1936	
95	Jun 1909	2252	Apr 1934	
158	Jun 1909	2253	Mar 1936	Sold to the Longmoor Military Railway.
51	Apr 1913	2254	Apr 1934	
64	Nov 1913	2255	May 1936	
65	Nov 1913	2256	May 1935	
69	Nov 1913	2257	May 1937	Sold to Manchester Collieries and named 'King George VI'.
89	Nov 1913	2258	Jun 1934	
96	May 1913	2259	Oct 1936	
97	May 1913	2260	Jun 1934	
172	Jun 1913	2261	Feb 1937	
72	1920	2262	Jan 1937	Sold to Manchester Collieries and named 'Sir Robert'. Frames survive.
18	1921	2263	Oct 1936	Experimentally converted to oil firing in 1921
22	1921	2264	Jun 1936	Sold to Manchester Collieries and named 'Kenneth'.
25	1921	2265	Jul 1936	
26	1921	2266	Dec 1936	
29	1921	2267	Apr 1935	
27	1922	2268	Jan 1936	
28	1922	2269	Dec 1934	Came into service after grouping.
1	1923	2270	Oct 1937	Came into service after grouping. Sold to Manchester Collieries and named 'Queen Elizabeth'.
2	1923	2271	Oct 1937	Came into service after grouping. Sold to Manchester Collieries and named 'Princess'. Initially preserved as part of the National Railway Museum collection. Subsequently donated to Foxfield Railway in April 2016.
10	1923	2272	Jul 1935	Came into service after grouping.
48	1923	2273	Feb 1937	Came into service after grouping.
