= NSR M Class =

British steam locomotive class

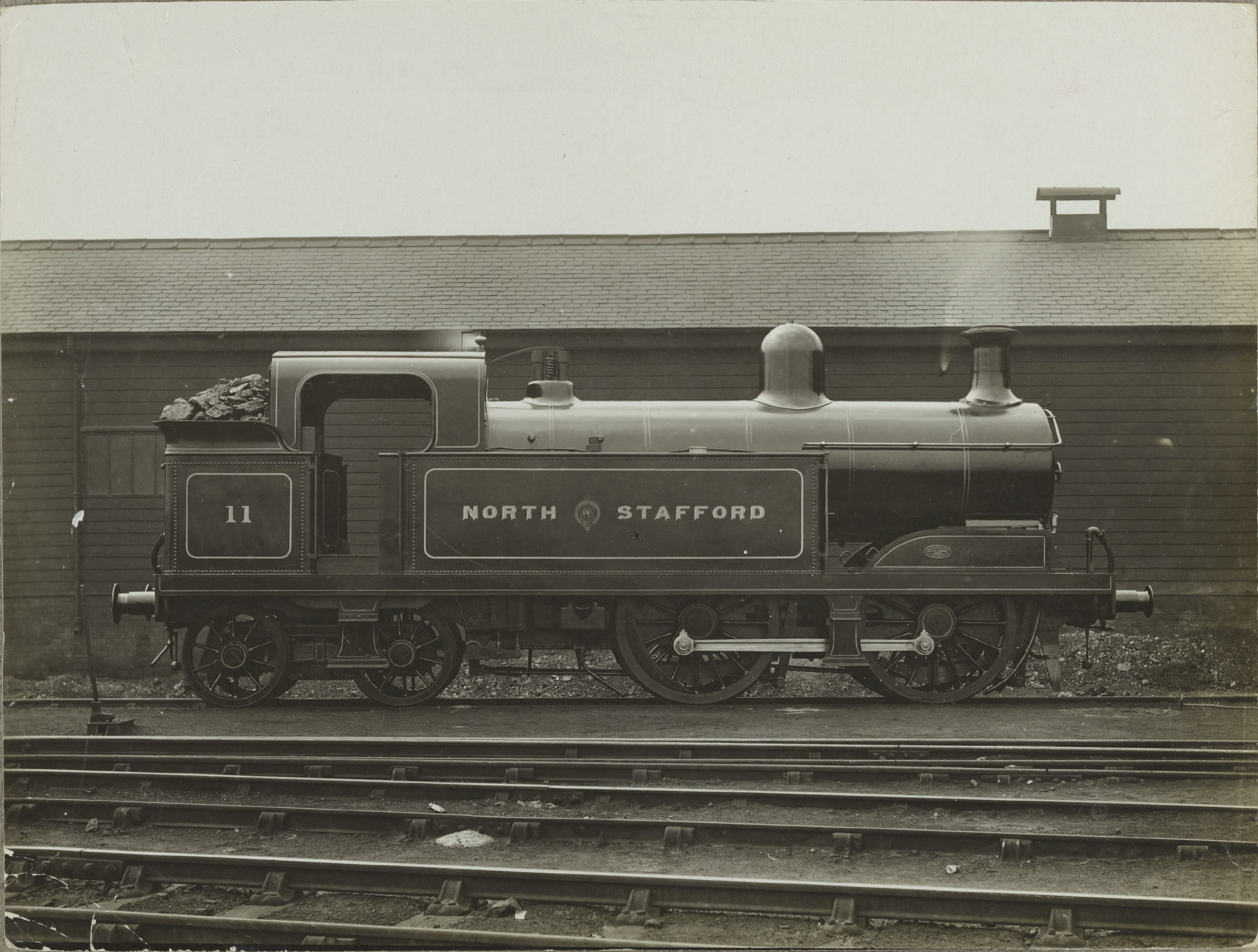
Type and origin
- Power type: Steam
- Designer: John Henry Adams
- Builder: NSR Stoke works
- Build date: 1907–1908, 1920
- Total produced: 9
Specifications
- Configuration
  - Whyte: 0-4-4T
  - UIC: B2
- Gauge: 4 ft 8 1/2 in (1,435 mm)
- Driver dia.: 5 ft 6 in (1,676 mm)
- Trailing dia.: 3 ft 7 in (1,092 mm)
- Wheelbase: Loco: 22 ft 9 in (6.93 m)
- Length: 35 ft 5 in (10.80 m)
- Height: 12 ft 10 1/2 in (3.92 m)
- Loco weight: 56 long tons 0 cwt (125,400 lb or 56.9 t) full
- Fuel type: Coal
- Fuel capacity: 2 long tons 15 cwt (6,200 lb or 2.8 t)
- Water cap.: 1,300 imp gal (5,900 L; 1,600 US gal)
- Firebox
  - Grate area: 17.8 sq ft (1.65 m^{2})
- Boiler pressure: 175 psi (1.21 MPa)
- Heating surface
  - Firebox: 108.3 sq ft (10.06 m^{2})
  - Tubes and flues: 1,011.7 sq ft (93.99 m^{2})
- Cylinders: Two, inside
- Cylinder size: 18 1/2 in × 26 in (470 mm × 660 mm)
Career
- Operators: North Staffordshire Railway; London, Midland and Scottish Railway
- Class: NSR: M Class
- Number in class: 9
- Retired: August 1930 – April 1939
- Disposition: All scrapped

The North Staffordshire Railway (NSR) M Class was a class of 0-4-4T steam locomotive designed by John H. Adams, third son of William Adams. It was designed for suburban passenger work on the Potteries loop lines. They shared components such as a drumhead smokebox which rested on the saddle and an almost identical boiler with the NSR L class. The boiler of the M class later became a standard boiler for the NSR, it being used on the NSR's New L class and H class. The M class introduced a new form of cab roof which curved around to join the cab sides, as with the Midland Railway at the time, and was soon copied by the SE&CR. Five were built between 1907 and 1908 at the NSR's Stoke Works, with a further four built in 1920 at Stoke under John A. Hookham, who had succeeded Adams upon the latters death in 1915. This second batch had longer bunkers and Ross "pop" safety valves instead of Ramsbottom safety valves but were otherwise similar; they were known as the New M Class.

All entered the London, Midland and Scottish Railway (LMS) stock upon formation in 1923 with little modification, other than replacing the original Ramsbottom safety valves with Ross-pop type. With the LMS' policy of standardisation, many NSR classes were prime targets for early scrapping due to the small size of the classes. As a result, all save one was withdrawn by 1936, having been displaced by more modern six-coupled tanks. This last locomotive had the distinction of being the last NSR locomotive to remain in service save for a battery electric shunting engine, but by the final days was itself reduced to shunting duties.

The livery of the M class was the NSR's Madder Lake with straw lining, and NORTH STAFFORD lettering on the side tanks along with the company crest. The number appeared on the bunker. In LMS days all received the crimson lake passenger livery of the early LMS with large numerals on the side tanks and the company crest on the bunker, but by 1928 they were repainted in plain black with L M S written on the tanks and number on the bunker.

Withdrawal took place between 1930 and 1939. None survived into preservation.

== List of locomotives ==
NSR number	Built	LMS number	Withdrawn
9	December 1907	1431	January 1936
11	December 1907	1432	October 1935
12	January 1908	1433	October 1935
41	March 1908	1434	March 1939
42	March 1908	1435	August 1930
15	1920	1436	April 1939
17	1920	1437	June 1935
19	1920	1438	January 1936
54	1920	1439	December 1931
