= Listed buildings in Dilhorne =

Dilhorne is a civil parish in the district of Staffordshire Moorlands, Staffordshire, England. It contains 19 listed buildings that are recorded in the National Heritage List for England. Of these, one is at Grade II*, the middle of the three grades, and the others are at Grade II, the lowest grade. The parish contains the village of Dilhorne, and the surrounding countryside, mainly to the north of the village. The listed buildings consist of houses, farmhouses and farm buildings, a church and items in the churchyard, and the lodge to a former hall.

== Key ==
Grade	Criteria
II*	Particularly important buildings of more than special interest
II	Buildings of national importance and special interest

== Buildings ==
Name and location	Photograph	Date	Notes	Grade
All Saints Church; 52.98760°N 2.04524°W		Late 13th century	The main body of the church was altered in the 15th century, and restored and extended in about 1819. It is built in sandstone, and has a roof of tile, slate and lead. The church consists of a nave with a clerestory, north and south aisles, a chancel and a west tower. The tower is octagonal with three stages and a parapet.	II*
Stanmore Hall; 52.99290°N 2.05815°W	—	Early 17th century	A large farmhouse in sandstone on a chamfered plinth, with moulded string courses, and a tile roof with verge parapets and pitched copings. There are two storeys and attics. The garden front has three gabled bays, and contains a Tudor arched doorway and chamfered mullioned windows. There is another Tudor arched doorway with a heavy lintel in the yard front.	II
Heywood Grange; 53.00777°N 2.05670°W	—	1672	A stone farmhouse that has a tile roof with verge parapets on corbelled kneelers. There are two storeys and an attic, and the farmhouse consists of a three-bay hall range, and a projecting gabled cross-wing on the left. On the front is a two-storey gabled porch that has a doorway with a heavy dated Tudor arched lintel. Above the doorway is a blocked window with three arched lights, and on the side walls of the porch are small circular windows in a diamond-shaped panel. In the gable apex is a blind two-light mullioned opening, and the other windows are replacement casements.	II
Barn west of Richmoorhill Farmhouse; 53.02120°N 2.04887°W	—	Late 17th century	The barn is in stone with a chamfered eaves course and a tile roof with verge parapets. There are two levels, consisting of a hay loft over cow sheds, and a catslide outshut at the rear. The barn contains three doors, a hay loft opening, and a casement window.	II
Barn south of Summerhill Farmhouse; 53.00757°N 2.04999°W	—	Late 17th or early 18th century	The barn is in stone with a chamfered eaves band, and a tile roof. There are two levels, consisting of a hay loft over cow sheds, and at the left is a lower extension. The barn contains doorways and a hay loft door, and in the extension is a casement window.	II
10 and 11 High Street; 52.98997°N 2.04098°W	—	Early 18th century	A pair of red brick houses with floor bands, and a tile roof. There are two storeys and an attic, three bays, and single-storey lean-to on the right. Most of the windows are casements, and there are two gabled dormers.	II
Day House Farmhouse; 52.99051°N 2.03853°W	—	18th century	The farmhouse was refaced in the 19th century. It is in roughcast red brick, and has a tile roof with verge parapets. There are two storeys and three bays. The central doorway has a reeded surround, and the windows are sashes with painted wedge lintels.	II
Banktop Farmhouse; 53.01344°N 2.04603°W	—	Late 18th century	The farmhouse is in painted brick with cogged eaves, and has a tile roof with verge parapets. There are two storeys and an attic, and three bays. The windows are casements with segmental heads.	II
Barn northeast of Banktop Farmhouse; 53.01377°N 2.04563°W	—	Late 18th century	The barn has an L-shaped plan, the larger range is in brick and the smaller in stone. The roofs are tiled with verge parapets, and there are two levels, with hay lofts over cowsheds and a cart shed. The barn contains a full-height cart entry, doorways with segmental arches, and hay loft openings.	II
Group of four chest tombs 52.98762°N 2.04492°W	—	Late 18th century	The chest tombs are in the churchyard of All Saints Church to the east of the church, and are in stone. They all have moulded plinths and top slabs, two have fluted pilasters at the angles, and one is rounded at the angles.	II
Group of five chest tombs 52.98772°N 2.04499°W	—	Late 18th century	The chest tombs are in the churchyard of All Saints Church to the north of the church. They are in stone, and have moulded plinths, inset moulded pilasters at the angles, and moulded top slabs.	II
Whitehurst memorial 52.98751°N 2.04535°W	—	1801	The memorial is in the churchyard of All Saints Church, and is to the memory of Mary Whitehurst. It is a chest tomb in stone on a moulded plinth, and has inset waisted pilasters at the angles with low-relief putti head motifs, two inscribed panels on each side, and a moulded top slab.	II
Wall and gates, All Saints Church; 52.98781°N 2.04542°W	—	Early 19th century	The walls to the west of the churchyard are in stone with roll-moulded coping, and they incorporate some 17th-century material. The main entrance has square stone piers with double cushion copings, and between are cast iron gates that have railings with floral heads. To the north is another opening with a heavy Tudor arched lintel.	II
Eddowes memorial 52.98786°N 2.04504°W	—	Early 19th century	The memorial is in the churchyard of All Saints Church, and is to the memory of Anne Eddowes. It is a pedestal tomb in stone with a wide base on a stepped and moulded plinth. The tomb has a frieze, a reeded cornice, a surbase and an urn finial.	II
Hollybush House, 14 High Street; 52.98988°N 2.04064°W	—	Early 19th century	A red brick house that has a tile roof with stone verge parapets. There are three storeys and three bays. The central doorway has an open pediment on consoles, and the windows are small-pane casements with painted wedge lintels ramped up to keystones.	II
The Old Parsonage; 52.98679°N 2.04706°W	—	Early 19th century	The house is in roughcast brick, and has a tile roof. There are two storeys, three bays, the middle bay projecting under a pediment, and an extensive service wing at the rear. On the front is a semicircular flat-roofed porch with two round columns and a round-headed entrance. The windows are sashes; in the ground floor they have segmental heads, and in the upper floor they are arranged in the style of Venetian windows.	II
Malthouse Farm and Cottage; 52.98838°N 2.04476°W	—	Mid 19th century	The farmhouse and attached cottage are in red brick, partly rendered, and have a tile roof with verge parapets. There are two storeys and four bays. The windows are casements with painted wedge lintels. There are two doorways, each with a moulded surround and an open pediment on consoles.	II
Stirrup memorial 52.98743°N 2.04564°W	—	Mid 19th century	The memorial is in the churchyard of All Saints Church, and is to the memory of members of the Stirrup family. It is a large pedestal tomb in stone on a stepped and moulded plinth. The tomb is almost cuboid, and has a large diagonal buttress on each angle, a moulded top slab, and a decorated urn on a moulded surbase.	II
The Lodge and walls 52.98860°N 2.04395°W		1850s	The former lodge to Dilhorne Hall, now demolished, is in red brick with stone dressings, moulded string courses, and has Dutch gable-type parapets and tile roofs. It is in Tudor style. There are three bays, the middle bay has two storeys, and contains a Tudor arched gateway, above which is frieze, a projecting three-light mullioned window, and a coat of arms in the gable apex. The bay is flanked by octagonal turrets, the outer bays have one storey, and contain cross windows with hood moulds. On each side of the lodge are ramped splay walls.	II
