= Cheadle Coalfield =

Coalfield in Staffordshire, England

Coordinates: 53.0°N 2.0°W

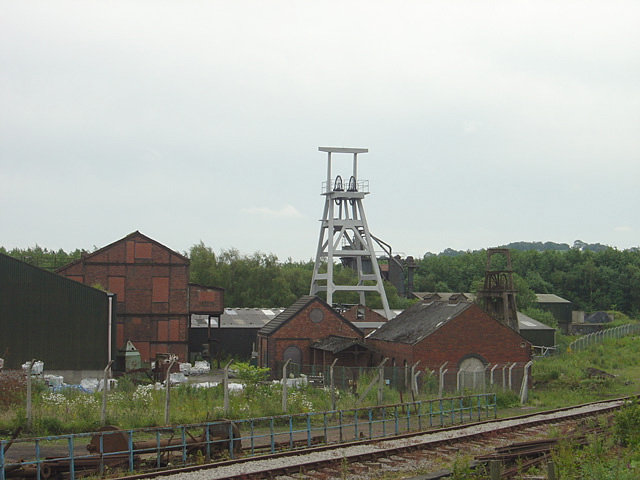
Foxfield Colliery

The Cheadle Coalfield is a coalfield in the United Kingdom. Centred on the town of Cheadle, Staffordshire, and its outlying villages it lies to the east of Stoke-on-Trent and the much larger North Staffordshire Coalfield. The area has been mined for many years, with documentary evidence from Croxden Abbey citing coal mining in the 13th century.

Deep mining ceased in 1965 with the closure of Foxfield Colliery by the National Coal Board. Private adit mining and opencast mining ceased in 1994 with the exhaustion of economic reserves.

== Geology ==
The Cheadle Coalfield covers an area of about 20 square miles (52 km^{2}) and lies to the East of Stoke on Trent and its larger neighbour, the North Staffordshire Coalfield. The boundary of the coalfield in the west is the Village of Forsbrook, and nearby Callow Hill where a small fault marks the western boundary. The coalfield then underlies the villages of Dilhorne and Kingsley. Further east a major fault in the Churnet Valley throws the coal upwards. Over millions of years the upper seams in this area were washed away and the lower seams outcrop around Ipstones, Foxt and Alton. The coalfield's eastern boundary is the Millstone Grit and Limestone of the Pennines around Ipstones Edge.

Despite the coalfield being detached from its much larger neighbour, the North Staffordshire Coalfield, and developing from the latter in relative isolation, geological analysis by the National Coal Board in the mid 20th century correlated the coal seams of the two coalfields.

Around the coalfield the measures are covered with alluvium and marl with sizeable amounts of industrial sand, gravel and limestone predominating in certain areas. The Sherwood sandstone group is the predominant rock that occurs, and comprises up to 205m of conglomerates and sandstone with scattered siltstone and mudstone. Within the area the Sandstone group has been subdivided into three lithostratigraphic formations, and quarrying for aggregates and minerals is an important industry around the coalfield area.

The coal is found at a shallow depth which made mining in the area relatively easy. As the coal outcrops around the Cheadle area, the seams that were heavily worked are the deeper seams in the North Staffs field, in many cases seams that were too deep to mine economically in North Staffordshire. However they were found in shallow depths around Cheadle.

== History ==
The coal measures around Cheadle were worked for a number of centuries and there is documentary evidence that the coal was worked before the 17th century. Dr Robert Plot, a Don from Oxford visited the area in the 1680s whilst surveying for a book he was writing on Staffordshire and encountered Coal Mining around Cheadle and Kingsley. George Barrow, a nineteenth Century geologist who did a survey of the Coalfield said that:

The district possesses a peculiar interest on account of the great antiquity of these workings, they can be traced back as far at least of the reign of Richard III.

The industry, however, had its heyday during the 19th century. The 1880 edition of the Ordnance Survey plan of the area shows 66 coal mines, along with a number of Ironstone mines. Mining around Cheadle was done on a relatively small scale compared with the nearby Potteries and many of the miners knew the owners of the mines, as most were owned by local landowners. In particular, the Whitehurst and Bamford families owned collieries around the Dilhorne area in a partnership. Their biggest concern was the Dilhorne Colliery, which was a large pit and incorporated the Old Engine Colliery, one of the first in Cheadle to have a Steam Engine. The Bowers family of Harewood Hall were local coalmasters for a number of years and originally owned the famous Woodhead Colliery.Robert Plant, a local character who was involved in many local mining ventures.

The industry gradually reduced in size in the early 20th century and by the late 1930s the only two deep mines left were Foxfield Colliery and New Haden Colliery. Both were fairly large mines for Cheadle and were very modern. Foxfield was heavily modernised during the 1930s when it was decided to close Parkhall Colliery and concentrate production at Foxfield, mainly due in part to the rail connection the colliery had to the Stoke - Derby railway line at Blythe Bridge. Extensive new surface facilities were built and, in what was unique for Cheadle, Concrete headgears were erected. New Haden Colliery, which had the early nickname of the "Klondyke" due to the thick Woodhead coal the pit mined was one of the first mines in Staffordshire to be electrified underground and, in addition to the colliery, there was a brickworks in production.

== Nationalisation to the present day ==
By the time of Nationalisation of the entire British Coal mining industry in 1947, Foxfield was the last deep mine in the Cheadle Coalfield. New Haden had closed in 1943 after heavy flooding underground rendered the mine uneconomic. The workforce was either transferred to Foxfield, or to Berry Hill Colliery in the Potteries.

Foxfield grew steadily under the ownership of the National Coal Board until it employed nearly 600 men by the mid-1950s. Output also peaked during this period at 210,813 tons in 1954. During this time the only Coal now Mined was The Big Dilhorne in the Dilhorne 19 and 20's Faces. The pit's surface buildings were again modernised and a new shower block for the miners was constructed, along with improvements in the Coal screens and washing facilities. However, output and manpower steadily decreased from the mid '50s peak and the colliery was finally closed in 1965. The majority of the miners were transferred to Florence Colliery in Longton, where a fully mechanised face in the Moss seam was prepared for the Cheadle miners. Some miners also transferred to Hem Heath Colliery in Trentham.

Foxfield was the last deep mine in the Cheadle Coalfield and had worked for 83 years, which was a record for a Cheadle pit. It had also stretched its boundaries further than any other pit in the coalfield and was indeed a worthy colliery and one that Cheadle should be very proud of. The last face that was worked at Foxfield was Dilhorne 21's, which lies under the Dilhorne Rocks area. Ironically, and considering the scale of the coal industry in Staffordshire, the winding gear and surface buildings at Foxfield still exist to this day and are owned by the Foxfield Steam Railway who run heritage steam traction to the former colliery along the branch line from their base at Blythe Bridge.

After the end of deep mining, coal was mined in Cheadle right up until the mid-1990s by opencast mining methods. There were also a few small adit, or drift, mines which were situated where the coal outcropped. Until the end of deep Coal Mining in Staffordshire during the 1990s, Cheadle was still very much a mining town with a lot of men working at Florence and Hem Heath Collieries and, regular Buses were laid on by British Coal to transport the Cheadle Miners to work in the Potteries Coalfield.

== Seams of the Cheadle Coalfield ==
Because the coalfield developed in isolation from the Potteries coalfield, the seam names are different from those in use in the Potteries. However, as stated earlier, the seams were correlated together in the 1950s by the analysis of marine bands. Below are the seams in the Cheadle Coalfield, the shallowest at the top. However, the shallow seams in the Potteries don't exist in Cheadle, having been washed away millions of years ago. The equivalent seam in the Potteries coalfield is shown in brackets, and the approximate thickness is shown in feet.

- Delphouse (Bellringer) 2'6"
- Two Yard (10 Feet) 5'0"
- Getley 2'0"
- Half Yard (Bowling Alley) 2'8"
- Yard (Holly Lane) 3'0"
- Litley (Hard Mine) 2'6" (the coal is split by a 4" dirt band into upper & lower Litley seams)
- Four Feet (New Moss) 4'0"
- Thin (Flatts) 1'6"
- Little Dilhorne (Banbury) 2'8"
- Big Dilhorne (Cockshead) 5'0" (also nicknamed the Cheadle, Huntley or six feet)
- Blackstone 1'6"
- Ouster (Limekiln) 0'9"
- Parkhall Sweet (Whitehurst) 1'0"
- Little Alecs 1'6"
- Alecs (Bullhurst) 3'6" (nicknamed the stinking due to high sulphur content)
- Foxfield (Winpenny) 1'0" (the seam is named after Foxfield wood where it outcrops, not the Pit)
- Cobble (Brickiln) n/a
- Rider (little Cannel Row) n/a
- Woodhead (King) 3'0" (the most famous Coal in Cheadle)
- Crabtree (Crabtree) n/a
- Third Grit/sweet n/a (mainly found around the Foxt/Ipstones area)

All the thicknesses are approximate.

The seams are generally named after where the coal outcropped, i.e., Woodhead, Dilhorne, Foxfield, Litley, etc.

Of all the coal, the Woodhead is probably the most famous in the coalfield and was the seam that was most sought after by the miners and the owners. The Dilhorne seam is famous as it was extensively worked by Foxfield Colliery right up to the closure of that pit. The Crabtree and the Third Grit were almost exclusively mined in the areas to the East of the Churnet Valley as all the other seams have long since eroded away.
