= NSR H1 class =

NSR H1 Class
Type and origin
- Power type: Steam
- Designer: John Henry Adams
- Builder: NSR Stoke works
- Build date: 1910-11
- Total produced: 4
Specifications
- Configuration
  - Whyte: 0-6-0
  - UIC: C
- Gauge: 4 ft 8 1/2 in (1,435 mm)
- Driver dia.: 5 ft 0 in (1,524 mm)
- Wheelbase: 16 ft 6 in (5.03 m)
- Length: 27 ft 9.25 in (8.46 m)
- Height: 12 ft 6 in (3.81 m)
- Loco weight: 35 long tons 7 cwt (79,200 lb or 35.9 t) full
- Fuel type: Coal
- Fuel capacity: 5 long tons 0 cwt (11,200 lb or 5.1 t)
- Water cap.: 3,200 imp gal (15,000 L; 3,800 US gal)
- Firebox
  - Grate area: 17.8 sq ft (1.65 m^{2})
- Boiler pressure: 175 psi (1.21 MPa)
- Heating surface
  - Firebox: 133 sq ft (12.4 m^{2})
  - Tubes and flues: 1,064 sq ft (98.8 m^{2})
- Cylinders: Two, inside
- Cylinder size: 18 1/2 in × 26 in (470 mm × 660 mm)
Performance figures
- Tractive effort: 19,890 lbf (88.5 kN)
Career
- Operators: North Staffordshire Railway; London, Midland and Scottish Railway
- Class: NSR: H1 Class
- Power class: 3F
- Number in class: 4
- Retired: January 1929 – October 1930
- Disposition: All scrapped

The North Staffordshire Railway (NSR) H1 Class was a class of 0-6-0 steam locomotive designed by John H. Adams, third son of William Adams. They were designed as a development as the previous H Class, adding a Belpaire firebox to a new design of boiler, which was similar to that of the NSR G class but with a reduced barrel length. Four were built between December 1910 and March 1911, all at the company's Stoke railway works. The whole class was withdrawn by the end of 1930, having quickly been displaced by the LMS 4F.

As with the H class, the H1s were built with the NSR's long distance freight work outside of their own system thanks to their extensive running powers, but they also partook in some passenger and excursion trains.

The livery of the H1 Class was the NSR's Madder Lake with straw lining, and NORTH STAFFORD lettering on the tender along with the company crest. The number appeared on the cabside. In LMS days they received the standard plain black freight livery with large numerals on the tender. They were renumbered twice in LMS ownership; once, upon grouping, in the 23xx series, and again in 1928 to make way for the LMS Fowler 2-6-4T being built at the time. As a result, they were put in the 83xx series following on from the LNWR 18in Goods Class.

== List of Locomotives ==
| NSR number | Built | First LMS number | Second LMS number | Withdrawn | Notes |
|---|---|---|---|---|---|
| 6 | December 1910 | 2363 | 8685 | January 1929 | |
| 90 | December 1910 | 2364 | 8686 | December 1929 | |
| 91 | February 1911 | 2365 | 8687 | January 1930 | |
| 92 | March 1911 | 2366 | 8688 | October 1930 | |
