= NSR H class =

NSR H Class
Type and origin
- Power type: Steam
- Designer: John Henry Adams
- Builder: NSR Stoke works
- Build date: 1910-11
- Total produced: 4
Specifications
- Configuration
  - Whyte: 0-6-0
  - UIC: C
- Gauge: 4 ft 8 1/2 in (1,435 mm)
- Driver dia.: 5 ft 0 in (1,524 mm)
- Wheelbase: 16 ft 6 in (5.03 m)
- Length: 27 ft 9.25 in (8.46 m)
- Height: 12 ft 6 in (3.81 m)
- Loco weight: 42 long tons 17 cwt (96,000 lb or 43.5 t) full
- Fuel type: Coal
- Fuel capacity: 5 long tons 0 cwt (11,200 lb or 5.1 t)
- Water cap.: 3,200 imp gal (15,000 L; 3,800 US gal)
- Firebox
  - Grate area: 17.8 sq ft (1.65 m^{2})
- Boiler pressure: 175 psi (1.21 MPa)
- Heating surface
  - Firebox: 108.3 sq ft (10.06 m^{2})
  - Tubes and flues: 1,011.7 sq ft (93.99 m^{2})
- Cylinders: Two, inside
- Cylinder size: 18 1/2 in × 26 in (470 mm × 660 mm)
Career
- Operators: North Staffordshire Railway; London, Midland and Scottish Railway
- Class: NSR: H Class
- Power class: 3F
- Number in class: 4
- Retired: November 1929 – January 1930
- Disposition: All scrapped

The North Staffordshire Railway (NSR) H Class was a class of 0-6-0 steam locomotive designed by John H. Adams, third son of William Adams. They were designed to replace aging 0-6-0 locomotives on NSR long distance goods and coal trains both on and off the NR network thanks to the NSR's extensive running powers. Four were built in December 1909 all at the company's Stoke railway works. The whole class was withdrawn by the beginning of 1930, owing to the small nature of the class. This small class was supplemented by an additional modified four, designated H1 class.

The only modification to the class during LMS days was regarding the safety valves, the original Ramsbottom ones being replaced by Ross-pop type.

The livery of the H Class was the NSR's Madder Lake with straw lining, and NORTH STAFFORD lettering on the tender along with the company crest. The number appeared on the cabside. In LMS days they received the standard plain black freight livery with large numerals on the tender. They were renumbered twice in LMS ownership; once, upon grouping, in the 23xx series, and again in 1928 to make way for the LMS Fowler 2-6-4T being built at the time, to Nos. 8681 to 8684.

== List of Locomotives ==
| NSR number | Built | First LMS number | Second LMS number | Withdrawn | Notes |
|---|---|---|---|---|---|
| 84 | December 1909 | 2359 | 8681 | January 1930 | |
| 85 | December 1909 | 2360 | 8682 | May 1929 | |
| 88 | December 1909 | 2361 | 8683 | May 1928 | |
| 169 | December 1909 | 2362 | 8684 | November 1928 | |
