= Worcester Engine Works Company =

Former railway engineering company

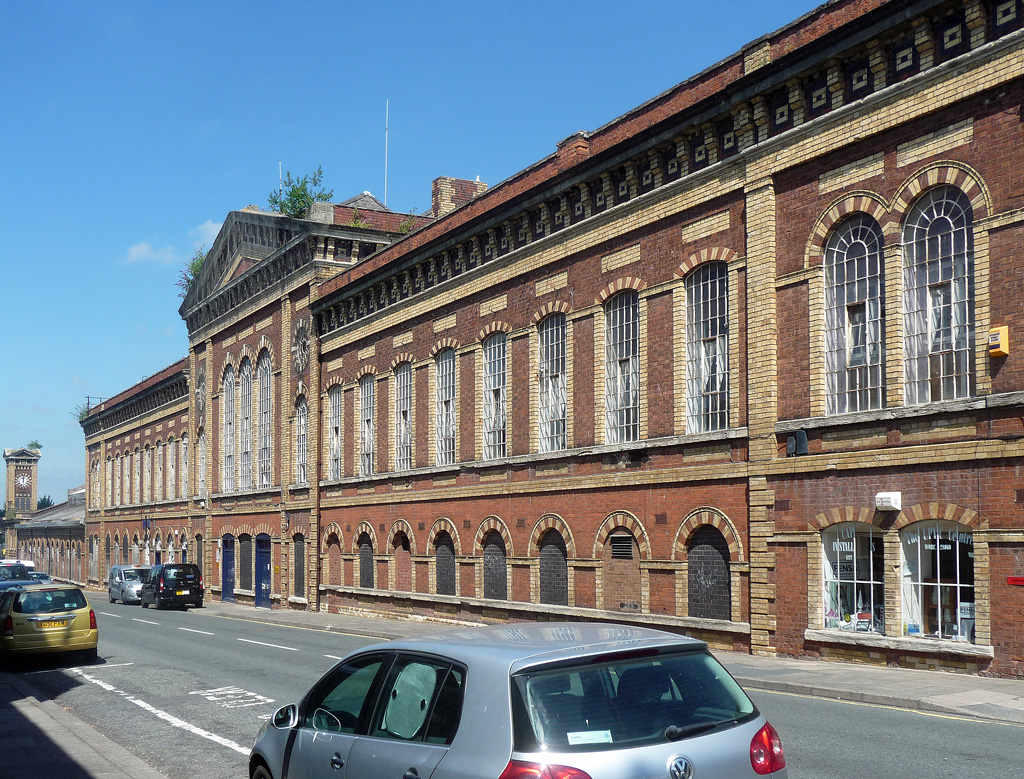
- Company type: Public
- Industry: Railway engineering
- Founded: 4 August 1864; 160 years ago in Worcester, England
- Defunct: 22 June 1872
- Fate: Dissolved

The Worcester Engine Works Company was a short lived British railway engineering company established in Worcester in 1864. Over the next nine years the company built locomotives for several British and European railway companies before the company went into voluntary liquidation in 1872 with the company being full liquidated by 1874. The premises built by the company in Worcester still stand and are a Grade II listed building.

== History ==
The Great Western Railway carriage works in Worcester were destroyed in a fire in 1864 and the railway company decided to move the work to Swindon rather than rebuild in Worcester. A number of local businessmen, led by Alexander Clunes Sheriff, took the decision to provide employment for the men made redundant by establishing their own engineering works. New locomotive works were built on Shrub Hill Road, close to Worcester Shrub Hill station. For the first three years the company was profitable having received and fulfilling orders from the North Staffordshire Railway, Great Eastern Railway and Bristol & Exeter Railway companies as well as a small number of locomotives for contractors, two of which eventually ran on the Lwów-Czerniowce-Jassy Railway in Austria-Hungary.

After 1867 the effects of the economic panic of 1866 hit the company; orders dried up and lavish spending by the directors (mainly on the company buildings) saw the company make significant losses. A small return to profit was made in 1869 and a contract for the supply of 15 locomotives to the Nicolas Railway in Russia was obtained. But after the completion of the Russian order no further orders were received and the company made further losses resulting in the shareholders agreeing to voluntary liquidation in 1872, with the liquidation being complete by May 1874.
