= Dilhorne =

Village in Staffordshire, England

Coordinates: 52.990°N 2.041°W

- Location within Staffordshire
- Population: 497 (2011)
- OS grid reference: SJ975435
- Civil parish: Dilhorne
- District: Staffordshire Moorlands
- Shire county: Staffordshire
- Region: West Midlands
- Country: England
- Sovereign state: United Kingdom
- Post town: Stoke-on-Trent
- Postcode district: ST10
- Dialling code: 01782 and 01538
- Police: Staffordshire
- Fire: Staffordshire
- Ambulance: West Midlands
- UK Parliament: Staffordshire Moorlands

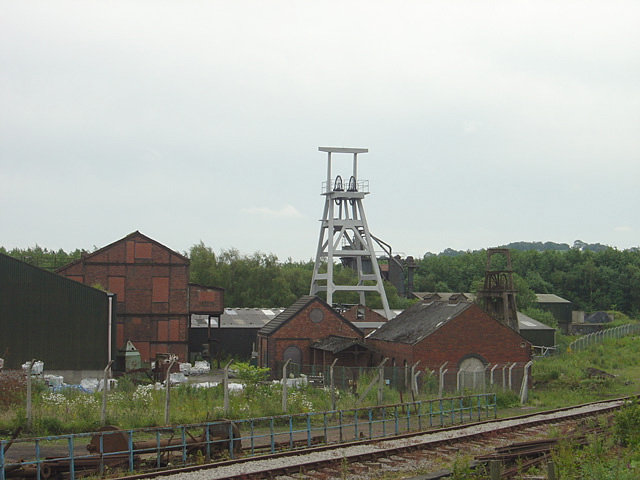
Foxfield Colliery

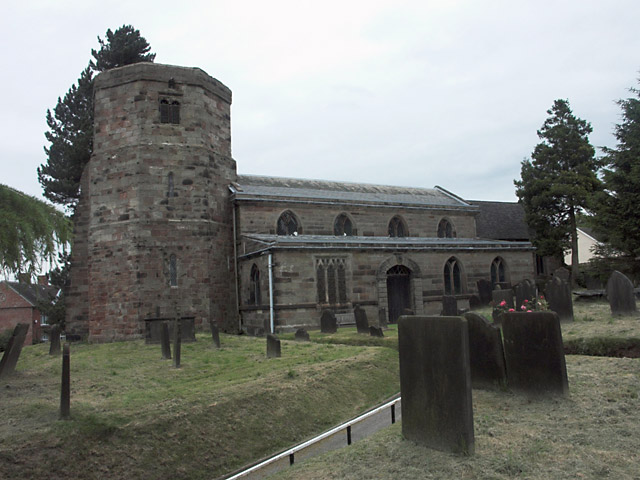
All Saints church

Dilhorne is an ancient parish and village in Staffordshire, three miles from Cheadle and six miles from Stoke-on-Trent. The village is within the Staffordshire Moorlands area.

Historically the village has been in the Parish of Dilhorne and the ancient Hundred of Totmonslow.

== Etymology ==
The name Dilhorne has its origins in the old English name of "Delverne" which means "place of digging" and is because Dilhorne sits on the Cheadle Coalfield and several seams of very high quality coal outcrop in the area. The name of Delverne, which is mentioned in the Domesday Book, suggests that the area was known for coal mining nearly a thousand years ago.

== Coal mining ==
Historically, the largest industry in Dilhorne for hundreds of years was coal mining. The coal mining industry became the main source of employment in the 19th century as the small adit mines that followed the outcrops of coal progressively gave way to larger mines, funded and owned in part by the local landowners who now became coalmasters. In particular the Whitehurst and Bamford families became co-owners of several mining concerns, the largest being the Dilhorne Colliery, a large mine which was known in the coalfield for its modern steam engines. The site of Dilhorne Colliery is occupied nowadays by a small farm known as "Old Engine Farm".

=== Foxfield Colliery ===
Foxfield Colliery, located at Godley Brook was the largest mine in Dilhorne, eventually the largest mine in the Cheadle Coalfield and in the end the last mine remaining in the coalfield, working for well over 80 years. However, its beginnings made its future far from uncertain. Originally, the landowner wouldn't let anyone prospect for coal on her land, and when finally a shaft was sunk in 1880 it was called "Manns Pit", instead of Foxfield. The pit did though have access to good coal, and the Dilhorne and Woodhead seams were mined. In a sign of the times, when the first Woodhead coal was mined all the colliery's staff were treated to a grand supper at the Wagon and Horses Public House.

The pit continued to grow and by 1893 Foxfield became the first mine in Cheadle to have its own rail connection to the national rail network as a three and a half mile branch line was opened to Blythe Bridge and connection to the NSR Stoke to Derby line.

Foxfield was extensively modernised in the 1930s as all production from neighbouring Parkhall Colliery was moved to Foxfield. New coal screens were built and concrete headgears were constructed. The seams mined were the Dilhorne, Four Foot and Woodhead.

Foxfield, along with the rest of the coal industry was nationalised in 1947, and the pit entered a period of expansion where by 1954 the workforce stood at 550 with 210,000 tonnes mined a year. However, this was the high water mark and gradually output and manpower decreased. In 1965 Foxfield Colliery was closed by the National Coal Board. The colliery had nearly exhausted its economic reserves, and as it was not fully mechanised, the board decided to transfer the majority of the miners to Florence Colliery in Longton where a fully mechanised face in the Moss Seam was prepared for the Foxfield men. Foxfield Colliery is still standing, and today is owned by the Foxfield Steam Railway who run heritage steam traction to the site. Since April 2024 a team of volunteers from a variety of backgrounds, including the coal mining industry, is working to restore the buildings in preparation to reopen the site for public visits.

Mining still continued in the Dilhorne area but on a very small scale in small private adit mines. The most prominent was Abovepark Colliery near to Dairy House Farm. This small mine closed in 1998.

== Agriculture and farming ==
Agriculture in Dilhorne still plays a large part in the village, but the number of farms and workers has dramatically decreased over the years. The main concern of agriculture around the Dilhorne area is dairy farming.

== All Saints Parish Church ==
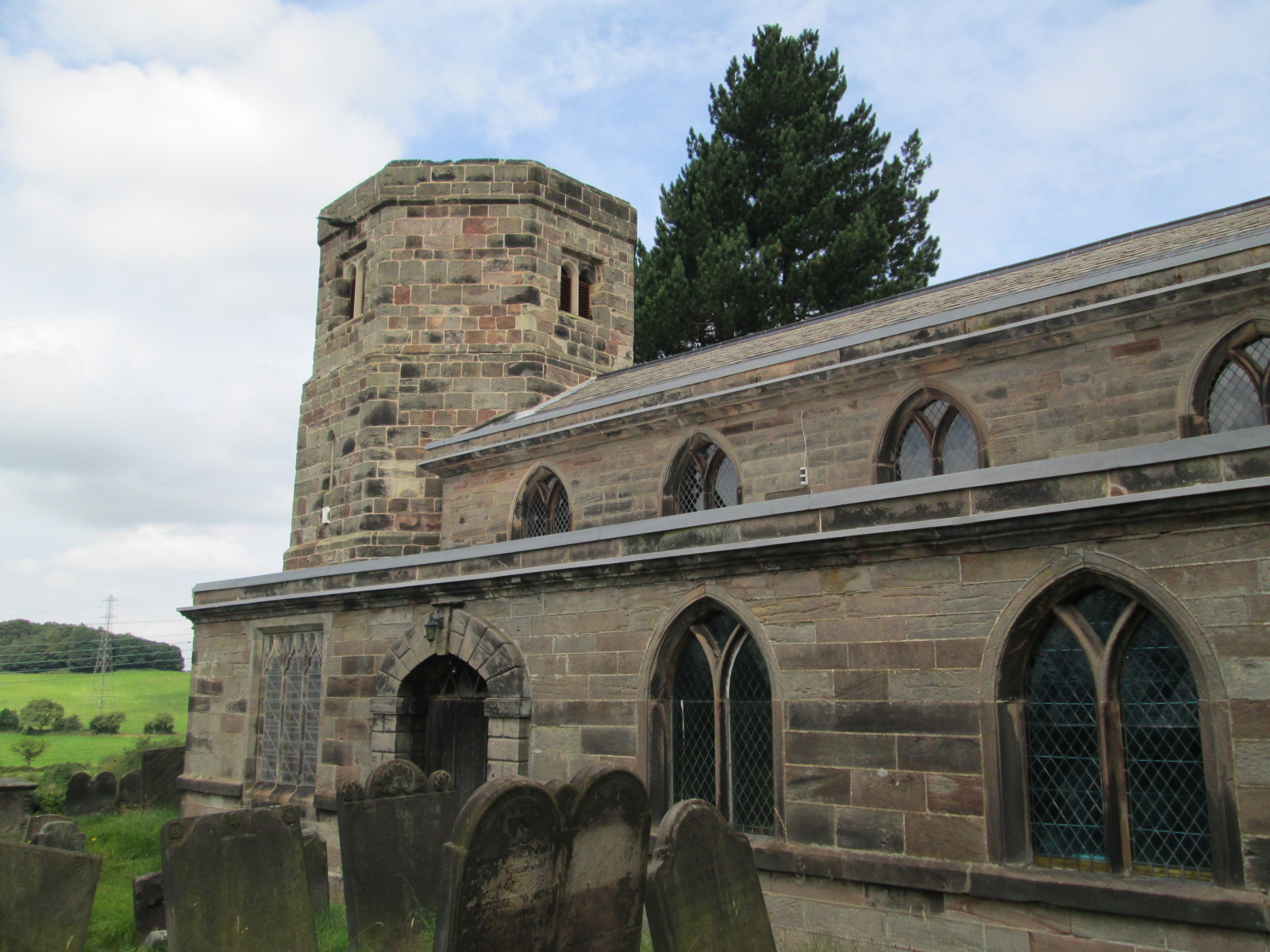
All Saints Church, viewed from the south-east

The parish church, All Saints, dates back to the Norman Conquest of England. A feature of the church is its octagonal tower, one of only a few such church towers in the country. All Saints Parish Church is one of the oldest in Staffordshire and services are every Sunday. The old parish of Dilhorne has changed a great deal over the last hundred years as outlying areas have merged into other parishes or became newer parishes. Dilhorne parish itself is now linked with nearby Caverswall as the united benefice of Caverswall and Dilhorne.

There is also a Methodist chapel in the Godley Brook area of the village.

== Sites of interest ==
Within the village there are two public houses: the Royal Oak, at the top of the High Street, and Charlie Bassett's, which is near All Saints Church. The latter is named after one of its former landlords, Charlie Bassett, and was originally named the Colliers Arms. It was renamed as The White Lion from 2010 to 2014.

Dilhorne Hall was the ancestral home of the Buller family who were noted in the legal profession in London during the 19th century.

There is a small primary school in the village, the Dilhorne Endowed School.

== Notable people ==
- William Loton (1838–1924), Australian politician, born in the area.
- Sir Harold Walker, KCB, KCMG, DSO (1862–1934), Lieutenant-general of Australian and New Zealand forces in WWI.
- Fred Flowers (1864–1928), locally born Australian politician.
- Edgar Meddings (1923–2020), bobsledder who competed in the 1948 Winter Olympics in St. Moritz.

== See also ==
- Listed buildings in Dilhorne
