= NSR G class =

Steam locomotive class

NSR G Class
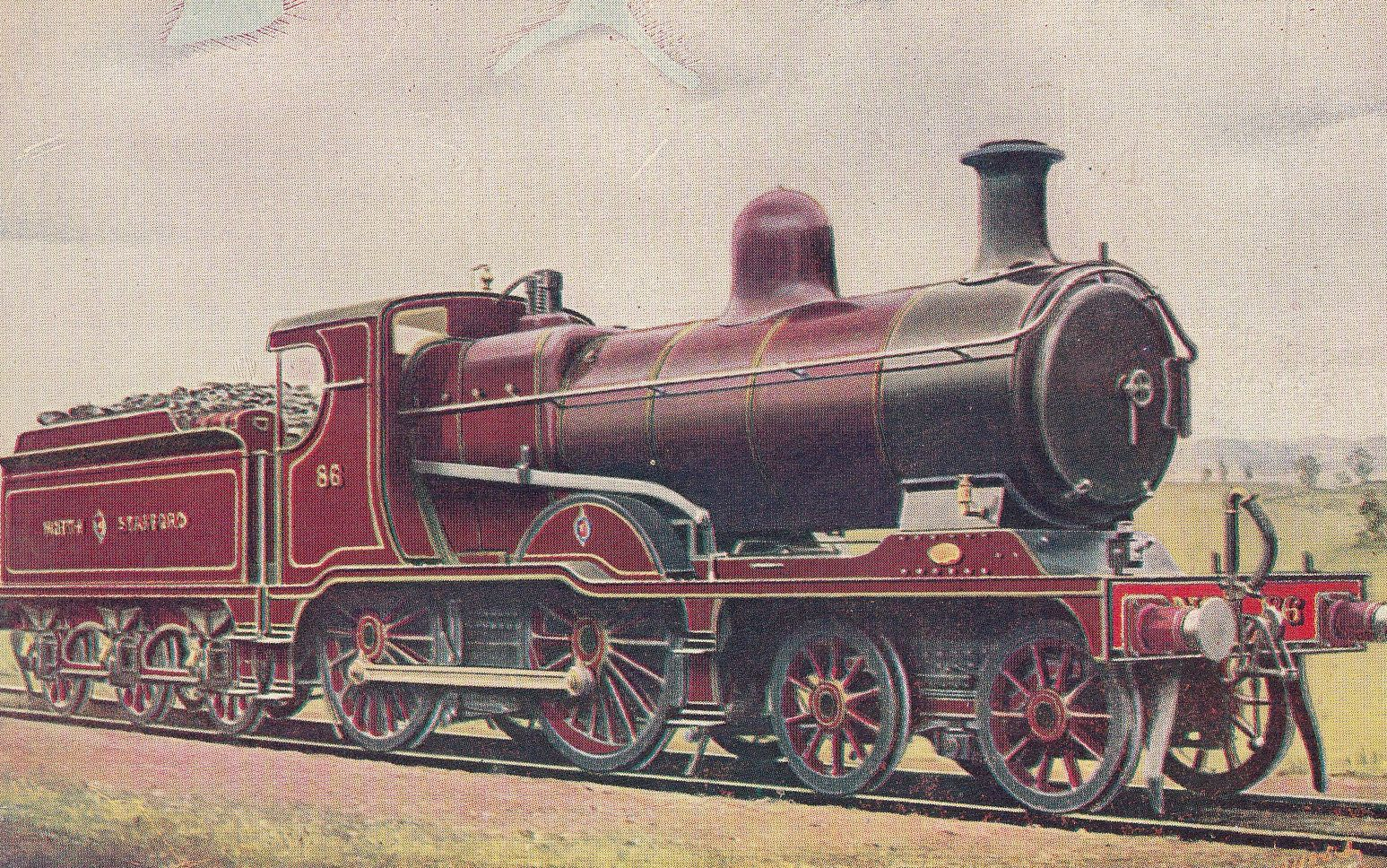
- Antique postcard of NSR G class 4-4-0 No 86
Type and origin
- Power type: Steam
- Designer: John Henry Adams
- Builder: NSR Stoke works
- Build date: 1910
- Total produced: 4
Specifications
- Configuration
  - Whyte: 4-4-0
  - UIC: 2′B n2
- Gauge: 4 ft 8 1/2 in (1,435 mm) standard gauge
- Leading dia.: 3 ft 6 in (1,067 mm)
- Driver dia.: 6 ft 0 in (1,829 mm)
- Wheelbase: 23 ft 1.5 in (7.05 m)
- Length: 30 ft 1 in (9.17 m)
- Width: 8 ft 0 in (2.44 m)
- Height: 11 ft 10 in (3.61 m)
- Loco weight: 47 long tons 11 cwt (106,500 lb or 48.3 t) full
- Fuel type: Coal
- Fuel capacity: 5 long tons 0 cwt (11,200 lb or 5.1 t)
- Water cap.: 3,200 imp gal (15,000 L; 3,800 US gal)
- Firebox
  - Grate area: 21 sq ft (2.0 m^{2})
- Boiler pressure: 175 psi (1.21 MPa)
- Heating surface
  - Firebox: 133 sq ft (12.4 m^{2})
  - Tubes and flues: 1,092 sq ft (101.5 m^{2})
- Cylinders: Two, inside
- Cylinder size: 18 1/2 in × 26 in (470 mm × 660 mm)
Career
- Operators: North Staffordshire Railway; London, Midland and Scottish Railway
- Class: NSR: G Class
- Power class: 3P
- Number in class: 4
- Retired: December 1928 – May 1933
- Disposition: All scrapped

The North Staffordshire Railway (NSR) G Class was a class of 4-4-0 steam locomotives designed by John H. Adams, third son of William Adams. The G Class was the first 4-4-0 class of locomotive designed for the NSR, and they superseded older 2-4-0s on the heaviest passenger traffic expresses on the railway between Crewe and Llandudno non-stop. The NSR introduced bogie stock to this route in 1906, resulting in much heavier trains.

In LMS days the class received the usual substitution of Ramsbottom safety valves for Ross-pop, and also the addition of an extra small spectacle plate on each side of the cab front.

The livery of the G Class was the NSR's Madder Lake with straw lining, and NORTH STAFFORD lettering on the tender along with the company crest. The number appeared on the cabside. In LMS days, they received the standard Crimson lake passenger livery with large numerals on the tender and the company crest on the cabside. They were renumbered twice in LMS ownership; once, upon grouping, and again in 1928 to make way for the LMS 2P 4-4-0s being built at the time. As a result, they were renumbered in the series following on from the LNWR George the Fifth Class.

== List of Locomotives ==
NSR number	Built	First LMS number	Second LMS number	Withdrawn	Notes
86	June 1910	595	5410	April 1929	Received the post 1927 insignia but retained the crimson lake livery until withdrawal.
170	June 1910	597	5412	December 1928	
171	July 1910	598	5413	May 1933	Last NSR tender engine in service.
87	July 1910	596	5411	June 1929	
