= Foxfield Railway =

Railway near Stoke-on-Trent, Staffordshire, England

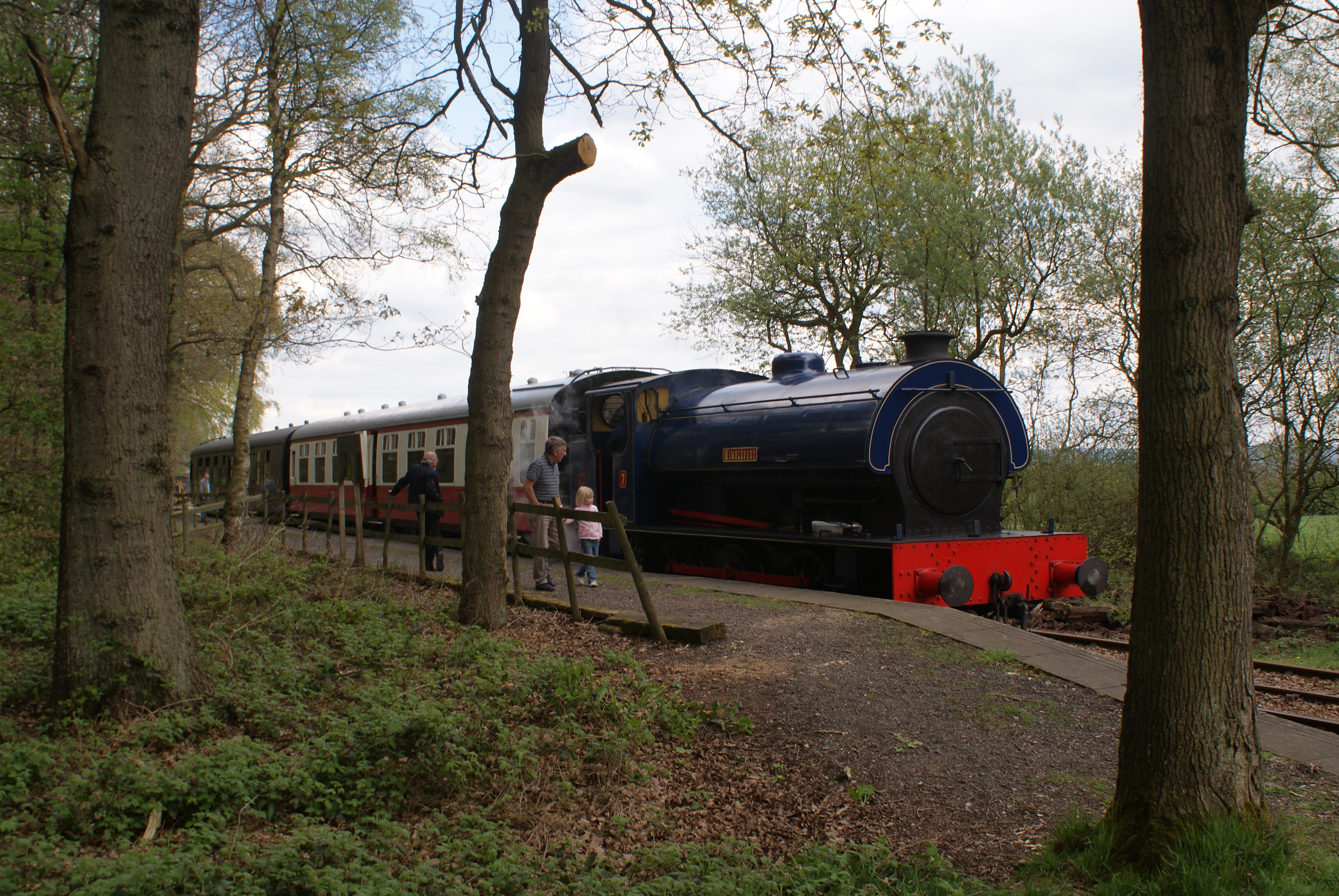
- Wimblebury seen working a train at Dilhorne Park
- Locale: Staffordshire
- Terminus: Caverswall Road
- Coordinates: 52.97570°N 2.06454°W

Commercial operations
- Original gauge: 1,435 mm (4 ft 8 1/2 in) standard gauge

Preserved operations
- Stations: 2
- Length: 2 1/4 miles (3.6 km)
- Preserved gauge: 1,435 mm (4 ft 8 1/2 in) standard gauge
- 1893: Opened
- 1965: Colliery closed

Preservation history
- 1965: Railway preserved

The Foxfield Railway is a preserved standard gauge line located south east of Stoke-on-Trent. The line was built in 1893 to serve the colliery at Dilhorne on the Cheadle Coalfield. It joined the North Staffordshire Railway line near Blythe Bridge. It is open at weekends and operates trains on Sundays, Bank Holidays and some Saturdays from April to October and Santa Special trains in December. It is home to the Knotty Coach Trust, the Foxfield Miniature Railway, a museum, café, bar and a shop.

== History ==
The Foxfield Railway was built in 1892-1893 to provide a link to the North Staffordshire Railway for the Foxfield Colliery. The railway was built by local labour provided by North Staffordshire Railway employees at weekends and supervised by the North Staffordshire Railway foreman plate layer Noah Stanier, using second hand material, again obtained from the North Staffordshire Railway.

=== Preservation ===
When the colliery closed in August 1965, local volunteers formed the Foxfield Light Railway Society to preserve the line. At first, passengers were taken in converted trucks up the formidable 1:19 to 1:26 gradient out of the colliery site at Dilhorne, accompanied by a tank engine.

Eventually, new coaches were purchased and a station was built at Caverswall Road, Blythe Bridge, half a mile from Blythe Bridge station. The service runs for 2 1/4 miles (3.6 km) from there to the top of Foxfield Bank.

== Location ==
The original line left the Crewe to Derby Line a little west of the station. The link has been lifted, but several abandoned wagons can be seen in the old sidings from passing trains. A station and depot have been built at Caverswall Road, half a mile north of Blythe Bridge railway station along Blythe Bridge Road.

The station at Caverswall offers visitor facilities such as a Buffet serving hot and cold food and drinks and a Real Ale bar "The One Legged Shunter". Also a museum building displaying a variety of artifacts relating to local railways and locomotives currently out of service. The adjacent Olcote Animal Sanctuary has an enclosure next to the miniature railway where animals can be found the first three Sundays in a month.

The railway operates Sundays and Bank Holidays from April to October and Santa Special trains during December.

== Locomotive fleet ==
The Foxfield Railway has the largest collection of standard gauge steam locomotives in Staffordshire, most of which are of industrial origins. Also a collection of industrial diesels.

=== Operational steam locomotives ===
Origin	Number/Name	Wheel arrangement	Class	Notes	Photograph
Hawthorn Leslie and Company	3581 Marston, Thompson & Evershed No. 3	0-4-0ST		Works number 3581 of 1924. Returned to service December 2021 following long term restoration.	
Kerr Stuart	4388	0-4-0ST	'Witch'	Built in 1926. Overhaul commenced following a change in ownership to Fred Dibnah's son in June 2020, and was completed in July 2022. Boiler ticket expires 2032.	
W. G. Bagnall	2623 Hawarden	0-4-0ST		Built in 1940. Returned to service in 2023 after major overhaul. Boiler ticket expires 2033.	
Dübs and Company	No. 4101 Dubs	0-4-0CT	Dübs and Company crane tank	Built in 1901. Returned to steam in September 2010 after major restoration. 2010 winner of the Heritage Railway Association John Coiley award for Locomotive restoration. Boiler ticket expired in 2020, returned to steam after overhaul in 2026.	

=== Steam locomotives off site ===
Origin	Number/Name	Wheel arrangement	Class	Notes	Photograph
Hunslet Engine Company	3839 Wimblebury	0-6-0ST	Austerity 0-6-0ST	Built in 1956. Returned to service in July 2017 after 10-yearly overhaul. On loan to the Churnet Valley Railway.	
Andrew Barclay Sons & Co.	1984 Boots No. 1	0-4-0F		Built in 1930. Offsite on long term loan to West Somerset Railway for restoration (completed in 2025).	
W. G. Bagnall	3059 Florence No. 2	0-6-0ST		Built in 1953. Returned to steam in 2008 after an extensive restoration. Returned to steam following overhaul in 2021, however has yet to operate a passenger service on the railway and has been on loan to the Lakeside and Haverthwaite Railway since April 2026.	

=== Steam locomotives undergoing overhaul or restoration ===
Origin	Number/Name	Wheel arrangement	Class	Notes	Photograph
Beyer, Peacock & Co.	1827	0-4-0ST		Built in 1879. Re-entered service during 2013 and withdrawn for overhaul in 2022.	
Hunslet Engine Co.	3694 Whiston	0-6-0ST	Austerity	It’s being fixed slowly	
Avonside Engine Co.	1563 John Paton	0-4-0ST		Built in 1908. Undergoing long term restoration.	
Peckett and Sons	1567 Ackton Hall No 3	0-6-0ST		Built in 1923. The only surviving example of an inside cylindered 0-6-0 Peckett. Acquired from the National Coal Mining Museum in July 2015. Dismantled for restoration.	

=== Stored steam locomotives ===
Origin	Number/Name	Wheel arrangement	Class	Notes	Photograph
North Staffordshire Railway	2	0-6-2T	NSR New L Class	Built at Stoke works in 1923. On static display in the museum building. Transferred from the National Railway Museum to Foxfield and arrived at the railway on 21 April 2016.	
Haydock Foundry	C Bellerophon	0-6-0WT		Built in 1874. The oldest locomotive in the collection. Boiler ticket expired in 2018. Owned by the Vintage Carriage Trust.	
Robert Heath & Sons Ltd.	6	0-4-0ST		Built in 1886, rebuilt in 1934. Purchased by the Knotty Coach Trust in 2020 who are fundraising for the resumption of its overhaul.	
Peckett and Sons	933 Henry Cort	0-4-0ST	W4 Class	Built in 1903. On static display in the Museum building awaiting overhaul.	
Manning Wardle	1207 The Welshman	0-6-0ST		Built in 1890 as works no. 1207. Stored at Foxfield Colliery awaiting restoration. On Loan from the National Coal Mining Museum	
Peckett and Sons	1803 Ironbridge No. 1	0-4-0ST		Built in 1933. Awaiting overhaul, on display in the museum.	
Peckett and Sons	Works No. 2081 No. 11	0-4-0ST	OY Class	Built in 1947. Awaiting overhaul, on display in the museum.	
W. G. Bagnall	2221 Lewisham	0-6-0ST		Built in 1927. Stored awaiting overhaul after its boiler ticket expired in late 2007.	
Kerr Stuart	4127 Moss Bay	0-4-0ST		Built in 1920. On static display in the museum building.	
Sentinel Waggon Works	9535	0-4-0		Built in 1952. On static display in the yard. However, restoration is being considered.	

=== Operational diesel locomotives ===
Builder/class	Number/Name	Wheel arrangement	Notes	Photograph
Thomas Hill	111C	4wDH	Restored in 2014.	
W. G. Bagnall	3150 Wolstanton No. 3	0-6-0DM		
Bagnall	3207 Bagnall	4wDH		
Kerr Stuart	4421	6wDM	Worked its first passenger trains at the Staffordshire Steam Weekend 2022.	

=== Diesel locomotives undergoing overhaul or restoration ===
Builder/class	Number/Name	Wheel arrangement	Notes	Photograph
Thomas Hill	103C	4wDH	Undergoing restoration off site. Originally converted from a Sentinel 4wWBT steam locomotive, like Sentinel 9535.	
Andrew Barclay	486 Clive	0-6-0DH	In process of being returned to working order. Bodywork repaint in BR warning yellow as per Central Electricity Generating Board livery completed 5 November 2016. Lettering saying CEGB, Meaford Power Station and varnishing to take place and the frames will be blacked with red wheels. New engine mounts have been fitted and the engine run up a number of times (latest February 2021) and in order.	
English Electric/Drewry Car Co.	WD820	0-4-0DM	Used on the D-Day landings in 1944. Undergoing overhaul.	
Janus class	2868 Ludstone	0-6-0DE	Restoration started in 2015, which mainly focused on cosmetics, and the prevention of further corrosion to the locomotive. Mechanical work is now underway.	
Ruston and Hornsby 88DS	408496 Shanks No. 444	4wDM	Undergoing long term overhaul which began in February 2017. Engine lifted out in November 2017 along with most of the cab. Gradual reassembly underway.	
Ruston and Hornsby 165	424841 Roman	0-4-0DE	New generator bushes fitted along with new batteries. New starter motor sourced and waiting to be fitted. Bodywork has also received some attention.	

=== Stored diesel locomotives ===
Builder/class	Number/Name	Wheel arrangement	Notes	Photograph
Motor Rail Simplex	2262 Helen	4wDM	Stored awaiting restoration.	
Ruston and Hornsby 48DS	242915 Hercules	4wDM	A narrow gauge Ruston diesel locomotive that is attached to a standard gauge chassis. Stored awaiting overhaul.	

=== Electric locomotives ===
Builder/class	Number/Name	Wheel arrangement	Notes	Photograph
English Electric	1130	4wBE/WE	Built in 1939 as one of three locomotives supplied to the Spondon power facility in Derby. Non-operational due to a lack of batteries or overhead lines on site.	

== Passenger carriages ==
The railway has a collection of carriages from a wide range of years which are used to take passengers up and down the line.

Number	Type	Status	Notes	Photograph
M25607	SK	Operational	Overhauled back to running order by Rampart at Barrow Hill, Chesterfield in 2019	
M34672	BSK	Operational	Named Eric Swift after the late member who left a legacy which financed the overhaul of the railways MK1 fleet. returned to service in 2021 following extensive rebuild and conversion of the luggage area into an on train bar.	
M4762	TSO	Operational	Returned to service in 2021 following overhaul at the llangollen railway. part of the vehicles restoration involved removing the internal bulkhead at the toilet end and inserting a half door and removable seats to make it an accessible vehicle. This mod now quite successful with other heritage railways now doing the same	
M4243	TSO	Under Overhaul	Privately Owned. Initially on loan from the llangollen railway while 4762 was away for restoration, it was later purchased privately and is undergoing a major structural rebuild following the discovery of major corrosion	
M25225	SK	Stored	Privately owned, stored out of use at Dilhorne Park. severely derelict and also the victim of an arson attack. its future remains unknown as of 9/9/2024	
E80792	BG	Under Overhaul	Purchased by the society in 2024 for use as a storage vehicle but potential future use on the railway. currently being cosmetically restored into BR Maroon	
37519	LMS Theatrical Scenery Van	No longer on site.	Converted by the railway into the Bass Belle Observation Bar Car. 2026 sold to LMSCA and transferred to Rowlsey	
No1	LTSR PMV	Stored OOU	Rebuilt by the MR in 1920. Came to Foxfield and was converted into a kitchen car for the early wine and dine trains. now stored derelict	

- The NSR Rolling Stock Restoration Trust

In 2008 a small group was formed with the aim of restoring the two surviving North Staffordshire Railway 4-wheeled coaches, with a long term aim of recreating a proto-typical Victorian train that would have once operated in the local area. The Knotty Trust, as it has become known as, was registered as a charity in 2009 and in 2012 received a £30,000 grant for the completion of the first vehicle (no. 127). This was completed at Stanegate Restorations, who have become a major supporter in the recreation of a Knotty Train. Since then the collection has grown to include other former 'Knotty Coaches' that have been discovered, as well as other historically important vehicles.

Number	Type	Status	Notes
228	First (FY)	Undergoing Restoration	Owned by the NSRC, based at the Churnet Valley Railway. Given to the KCT on a 99-year loan in 2014, and so an appeal has now been launched for this vehicle's restoration. This is the next vehicle which is to be restored by the trust and also the final one to be restored as part of the Knotty Heritage train.
61	Third (TY)	Operational	The second vehicle to have to have been restored by the KCT. Entered service in August 2014, after a visit to the CVR to launch the "Project 28 Appeal".
127	Third (TY)	Operational	The first vehicle to have to have been restored by the KCT. Entered service in August 2014, alongside 61.
23	Brake Third (TB)	Operational	One of three newly discovered vehicles found in woodland alongside Rudyard Lake, though no number has presently been identified. These vehicles were recovered in October 2014, with the Brake Third being sent away immediately for restoration to begin at Stanegate Restorations. The coach was renovated as part of the "ABC" (Accessible Brake Coach) project and was launched into traffic in May 2019.
	First (FY)	Stored	One of three newly discovered vehicles found in woodland alongside Rudyard Lake, though no number has presently been identified. These vehicles were recovered in October 2014, and put into store whilst other projects take priority.
	First (FY)	Stored	One of three newly discovered vehicles found in woodland alongside Rudyard Lake, though no number has presently been identified and only half of this vehicle really exists following numerous years in the open. These vehicles were recovered in October 2014, and put into store whilst other projects take priority.
	MR Six-wheel Composite Luggage (CLZ)	Stored	One of three former Midland Railway vehicles donated to the KCT by Foxfield. One of only three survivors, the other two having been restored at the Keighley & Worth Valley Railway and National Railway Museum respectively. Luggage/First/Third class compartment carriage, no recognisable number has been found on the body to date. This vehicle is planned to be restored once a fully operation Knotty Train is operational.
1108	MR Bogie Third (T)	Stored	One of three former Midland Railway vehicles donated to the KCT. Whilst only the body survives, the vehicle is planned to be restored once a complete Knotty Train is operational.
348	MR Picnic Saloon (FOZ)	Stored at [Peak Rail]	One of three former Midland Railway vehicles donated to the KCT. Whilst only the body survives, a former SR PMV has been designated for use as part of the vehicle's restoration. To be done once a complete Knotty Train is operational.
	NSR Brake Van	Stored	The sides from an original NSR Brake Van were found being used as a barn on Kingsley Moor, including the original painted Knotty emblem. These have been recovered and are now stored at Foxfield.
4384	LMS Covered Carriage Truck (CCT)	Stored	Donated to the trust to assist with the eventual restoration of the CLZ.
731945	LMS Goods Brake Van	Stored	Frame only. To be modified for use with the ABC.
1703	SR Parcels & Miscellaneous Van (PMV)	Stored	Donated to KCT. Frames to be used for Saloon 348.

== Use as a filming location ==
Although located in Staffordshire, the railway was used for the filming of sequences for the BBC television series Return to Cranford, which is set in Cheshire. The railway featured in two episodes first broadcast in December 2009. Matilda 'Matty' Jenkyns (played by Judi Dench), invited several of the main characters to ride on the train in an attempt to alter their opinions about the benefits of the railway being extended into the town of Cranford.
