= Stoke railway works =

UK manufacturing facility

Coordinates: 53°0′3″N 2°10′39″W

Stoke railway works was set up in 1864 by the North Staffordshire Railway in the city of Stoke-on-Trent in the county of Staffordshire, England.

The railway's first engines were supplied by a variety of outside manufacturers: Robert Stephenson and Company, Vulcan Foundry, Hudswell Clarke, Kitson and Company, Neilson and Company, as well as Sharp Brothers and Company who supplied six, including "Dragon" which opened the line in 1848. These were of the class known as "Little Sharpes".

By 1864, the railway owned 64 locomotives. In 1868 the works was ready to build new machines, producing three 0-6-0 tank locomotives similar to a Hudswell Clarke design.

New building finished when the LMS took over, and it closed in 1927, with the work transferring to Crewe.

The site and almost all of the old building now makes up Hyde Park Industrial Estate
