= Keele railway station =

Former railway station in Staffordshire, England

Keele
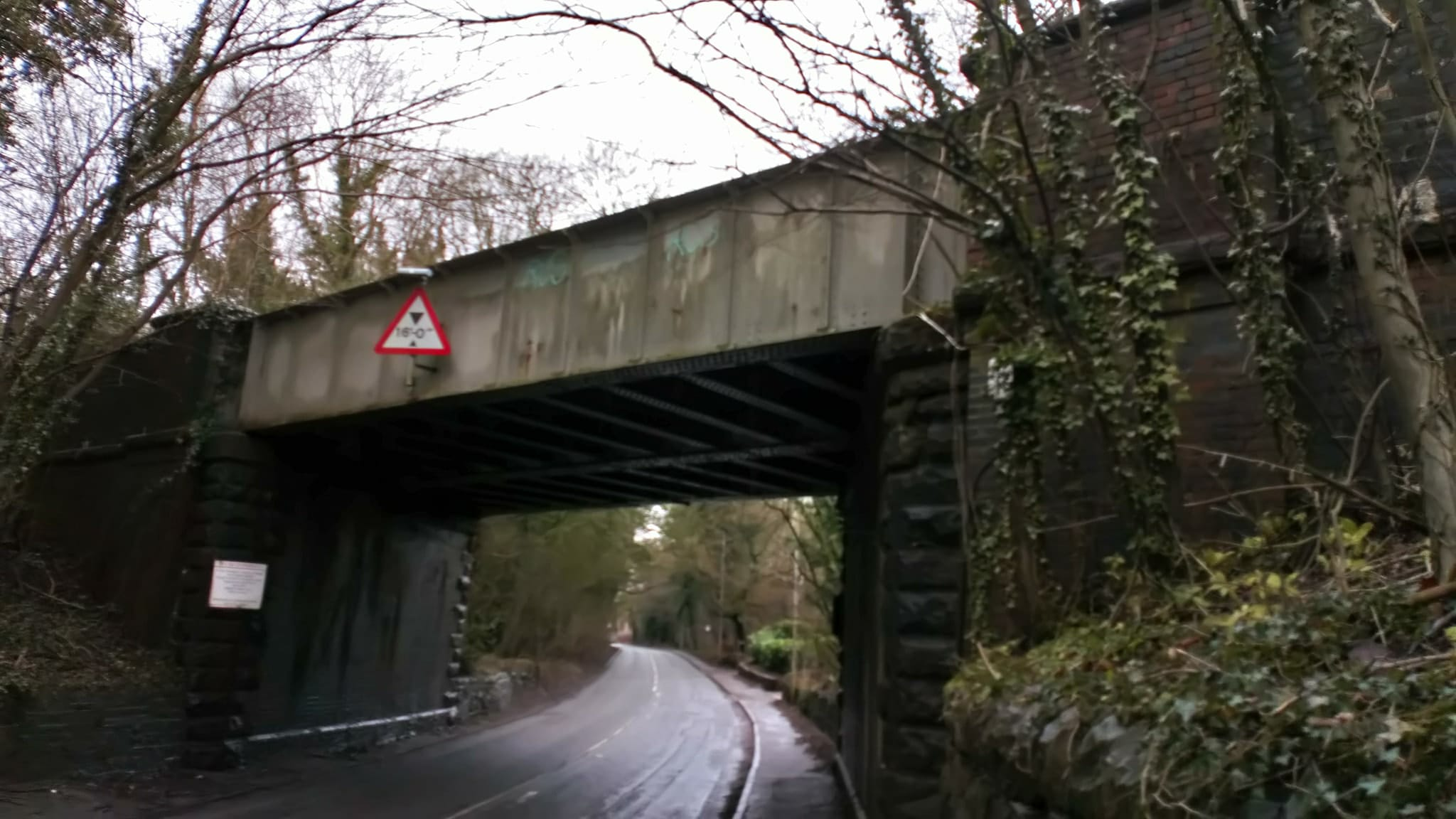
- Old railway bridge near to the station.

General information
- Location: Keele, Borough of Newcastle-under-Lyme, England
- Coordinates: 53.0102°N 2.3015°W
- Grid reference: SJ798459
- Platforms: 2

Other information
- Status: Disused

History
- Original company: North Staffordshire Railway
- Post-grouping: London, Midland & Scottish Railway

Key dates
- 1 October 1870: Opened as Keele Road
- 1898: Renamed Keele
- 7 May 1956: Closed to passengers
- 9 January 1967: Closed to all traffic
Location

Keele railway station served both the villages of Keele and Madeley Heath, in Staffordshire, England, between 1870 and 1967.

== History ==
The Stoke to Market Drayton Line was opened by the North Staffordshire Railway (NSR) in 1870. The station, then called Keele Road was opened on the same day as the line; it was renamed Keele in 1898.

The line through the station was singled in 1934 and the number of platforms reduced to one, but the line through the disused platform was retained as a passing loop for goods trains.

Passenger traffic at the station was withdrawn in 1956 and goods traffic was withdrawn in January 1967, when the station closed altogether. The line through the station remained in use until the closure of Silverdale Colliery in 1998.

Preceding station	Disused railways	Following station
Silverdale; Line closed, station closed	North Staffordshire Railway; Stoke to Market Drayton Line	Madeley Road; Line closed, station closed
Terminus	North Staffordshire Railway; Audley Branch Line	Leycett; Line closed, station closed

== The site today ==
The station building is no longer extant. The tracks between Silverdale and Pipe Gate remain in place, but are overgrown and out of use.
