= Leycett railway station =

Disused railway station in Staffordshire, England

Leycett

General information
- Location: Newcastle-under-Lyme, Staffordshire; England
- Coordinates: 53.0178°N 2.3100°W
- Grid reference: SJ793467
- Platforms: 2

Other information
- Status: Disused

History
- Original company: North Staffordshire Railway
- Post-grouping: London, Midland & Scottish Railway

Key dates
- 28 June 1880: Opened
- 27 April 1931: Closed to passenger traffic
- 18 June 1962: Closed to all traffic
Location

Leycett railway station is a disused railway station in Staffordshire, England.

The station was situated on the North Staffordshire Railway (NSR) Audley branch line. The Audley line ran from a junction on the Stoke to Crewe line near Alsager to a junction between Keele and Madeley Road on the Stoke to Market Drayton Line Like many of the lines opened by the NSR the Audley line was built primarily to carry mineral traffic. The line opened in 1870 but passenger services were not introduced until 1880, partially a wait caused by the need to build a junction from the Audley line that would allow trains to run directly towards Stoke rather than having to reverse at the junction which was how the line was originally constructed.

The decision to introduce passenger trains over the line led to the opening of a station to serve the mining village of Leycett in June 1880. By 1923 the station was served six services a day in each direction from Stoke on Trent, three terminating at Halmerend and the others continuing to Harecastle.

The rise in local bus services led to a decline in the revenue raised from passengers and in 1931 the London, Midland and Scottish Railway withdrew all passenger services on the Audley line from 27 April 1931.

Freight traffic too had been diminished by the economic depression towards the end of the 1920s and many of the local collieries closed as they became worked out or uneconomic to maintain and the line was reduced to a single line in 1933 although freight services continued until complete closure of the line between Audley and Keele in June 1962.

| Preceding station | Disused railways | Following station |
|---|---|---|
| Keele; Line & station closed | North Staffordshire Railway; Audley branch line | Halmerend; Line & station closed |
