= Knutton Halt railway station =

Disused railway station in Staffordshire, England

Knutton Halt

General information
- Location: Newcastle-under-Lyme, Staffordshire; England
- Coordinates: 53.0167°N 2.245°W
- Grid reference: SJ836466
- Platforms: 2

Other information
- Status: Disused

History
- Original company: North Staffordshire Railway
- Post-grouping: London, Midland & Scottish Railway

Key dates
- 1 May 1905: Opened
- 20 September 1926: Closed
Location

Knutton Halt railway station is a disused railway station in Staffordshire, England.

Situated on the North Staffordshire Railway (NSR) Stoke to Market Drayton Line, this halt was opened in 1905 when the NSR introduced a railmotor service between Silverdale and Trentham as a response to competition from tram companies. Situated between Knutton village and Knutton Forge, the station was not much used and was an early closure under London, Midland and Scottish railway ownership, closing in September 1926.

== Present day ==
No traces of the halt site remain, but the former trackbed is now a greenway.

Preceding station	Disused railways	Following station
Crown Street Halt; Line and station closed	North Staffordshire Railway; Stoke-Market Drayton Line	Liverpool Road Halt; Line and station closed
