= Newcastle-under-Lyme railway station =

Former railway station in Staffordshire, England

Newcastle-under-Lyme
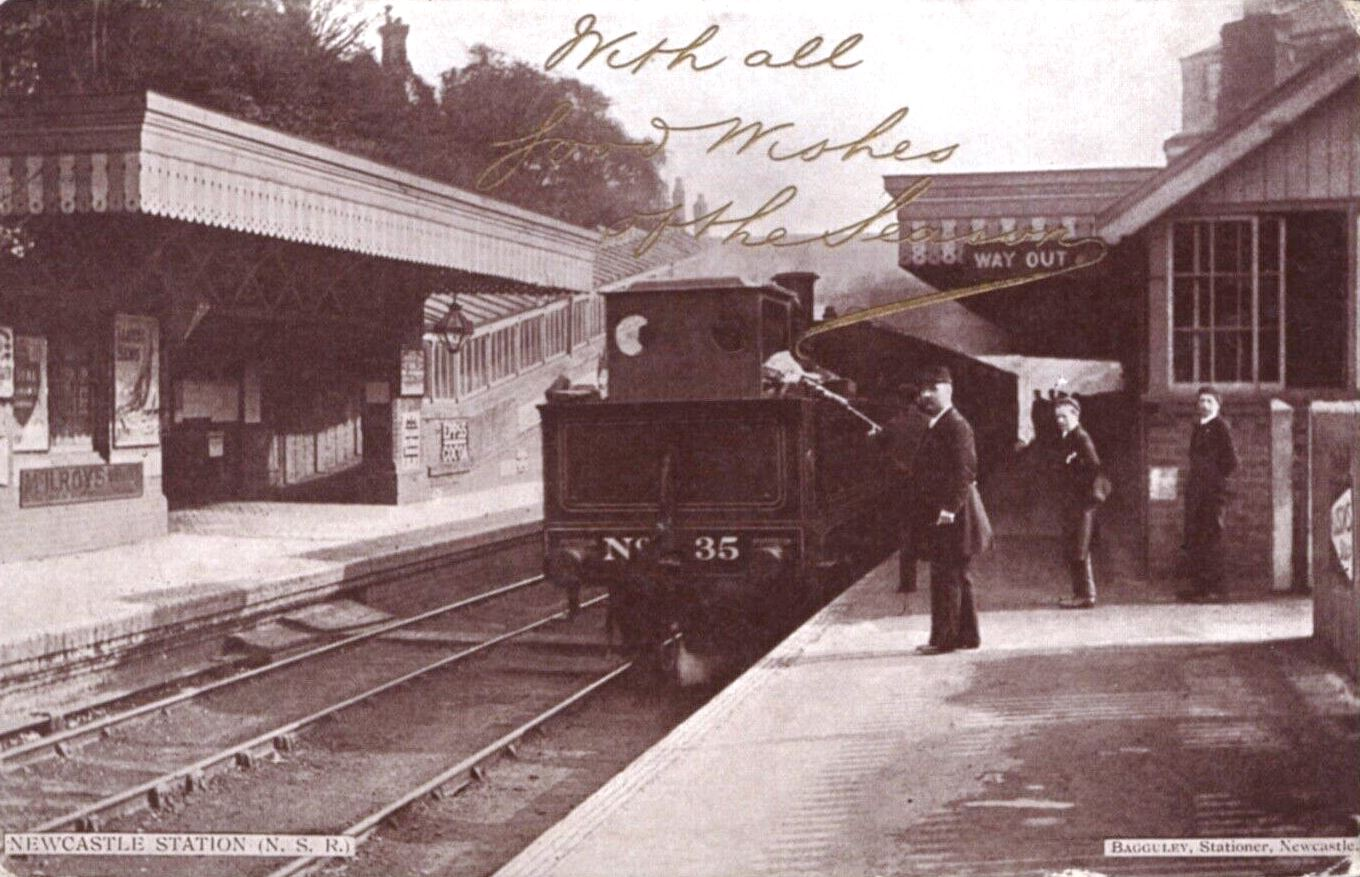

General information
- Location: Newcastle-under-Lyme, Staffordshire, England
- Grid reference: SJ852463
- Platforms: 2

Other information
- Status: Disused

History
- Original company: North Staffordshire Railway
- Post-grouping: London, Midland and Scottish Railway; London Midland Region of British Railways

Key dates
- 6 September 1852: Opened
- 2 March 1964: Closed
Location

Newcastle-under-Lyme railway station served the town of Newcastle-under-Lyme, in Staffordshire, England, between 1852 and 1964. It was a stop on the Stoke to Market Drayton Line.

== History ==
The station was opened by the North Staffordshire Railway in 1852, on the line between Stoke-on-Trent and Market Drayton.

The station was located on King Street, opposite the Borough Arms Hotel. A small goods yard was located on Water Street.

The station was recommended for closure in the Beeching Report of 1963, along with Silverdale and Liverpool Road Halt. It was closed on 2 March 1964.

Preceding station	Disused railways	Following station
Brampton Halt; Line closed, station closed	North Staffordshire Railway; Stoke-Market Drayton Line	Hartshill & Basford Halt; Line closed, station closed

== The site today ==
The station has been demolished and landscaped, but the parapet wall, part of the over bridge which is located across the Borough Arms Hotel, is extant.

The former trackbed north of the station has been built over, near to the former Hartshill tunnel and Hartshill and Basford Halt. The cutting has also been filled in and much of the trackbed forms part of Station Walks, a shared-use path used regularly by walkers and bikers.
