= Hollywood Music Festival =

1970 English rock music festival

Coordinates: 53.0000°N 2.3000°W

- Genre: Rock and folk, including hard rock and psychedelic rock styles
- Dates: 23 and 24 May 1970
- Locations: near Newcastle-under-Lyme, Staffordshire, England
- Years active: 1970
- Founders: Onista Ltd
- Attendance: 45,000 people (estimate)

The Hollywood Music Festival was held at Leycett in an area called Hollywood on the grounds of Ted Askey's Lower (pig) Farm at Finney Green, between Silverdale and Leycett, near Newcastle-under-Lyme, Staffordshire, England, on 23 and 24 May 1970. It was notable for the first performance of Grateful Dead in the UK and also for the performance of Jose Feliciano and Mungo Jerry, and featured high-profile bands such as Free, Ginger Baker's Air Force, Colosseum, Family, Black Sabbath and Traffic. The company responsible for the festival was Onista Ltd, who promptly went bankrupt and were unable to pay festival staff. Onista was an offshoot of Eliot Cohen's Red Bus company, with Ellis Elias and Elliot Cohen as the promoters. It was estimated to have been attended by about 45,000 people.

== History ==
This was the first of the major festivals held in the summer of 1970 and part of the festival was to have been filmed by the BBC. Andrew Burgoyne of Burgoyne Film and Audio Services also filmed and recorded audio of some of the festival. Film crews can be seen on 8 mm footage of bands taken by fans at the festival on several occasions, notably during Quintessence and the Dead's performances. A DVD and CD set was issued in 2010, featuring archive material from the Grateful Dead's set, and one number each from Free, Family, Screaming Lord Sutch, and Radha Krishna Temple along with a biographical booklet of the event.

Rumours circulated in the music papers about the supergroup that Lord Sutch was supposed to be fronting, Eric Clapton, John Lennon, and others were supposed to join in a super jam, but none of these luminaries showed up, nor did scheduled acts such as the James Gang and The Flying Burrito Brothers which tended to dilute the overseas offerings. Former Tyrannosaurus Rex percussionist Steve Peregrin Took was billed to debut his new band Shagrat (featuring Larry Wallis on guitar) at the festival but this also fell through. (Shagrat would eventually play their first - and only - gig at the Phun City festival that July. A third booking in December 1970 at the Roundhouse in London eventually went ahead as the first of numerous solo acoustic gigs by Took.)

The festival has generally tended to be eclipsed by the larger, better known festivals of 1970 such as the Isle of Wight Festival and the Bath Festival of Blues and Progressive Music 1970.

Across the road from the festival site is Highway Farm, where the bands waited until they were required. In December 1970, Free released an album called Highway.

== See also ==
- List of historic rock festivals
