= Dorrington Lane =

Hamlet in Shropshire, England

Coordinates: 52.971°N 2.419°W

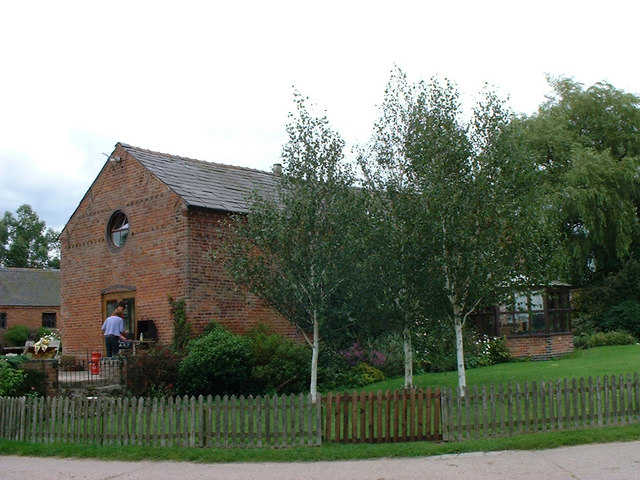
- Dorrington Hall Farm, Dorrington Lane

- Location within Shropshire
- OS grid reference: SJ718416
- Civil parish: Woore
- Unitary authority: Shropshire
- Ceremonial county: Shropshire
- Region: West Midlands
- Country: England
- Sovereign state: United Kingdom
- Post town: CREWE
- Postcode district: CW3
- Dialling code: 01630
- Police: West Mercia
- Fire: Shropshire
- Ambulance: West Midlands
- UK Parliament: North Shropshire

Dorrington Lane is a hamlet near the village of Woore in northeast Shropshire, England. There are around 12 former council houses and two larger houses called Norley and Oakley cottage. There is a large mansion house called Dorrington Old Hall which is about 700 years old. The hamlet contains several farms, including one of the biggest stud farms outside Newmarket. The main nearby towns are Market Drayton, Newcastle-under-Lyme, Nantwich and Crewe. The nearest city is Stoke on Trent.

Dorrington Lane used to be home to the Woore Hunt Races where Dick Francis supposedly ran his first race.

Dorrington Old Hall is listed in the Domesday Book and a past Lord Mayor of London, John Boydell was born there.
