= Norton in Hales =

Village in Shropshire, England

Coordinates: 52.944°N 2.443°W

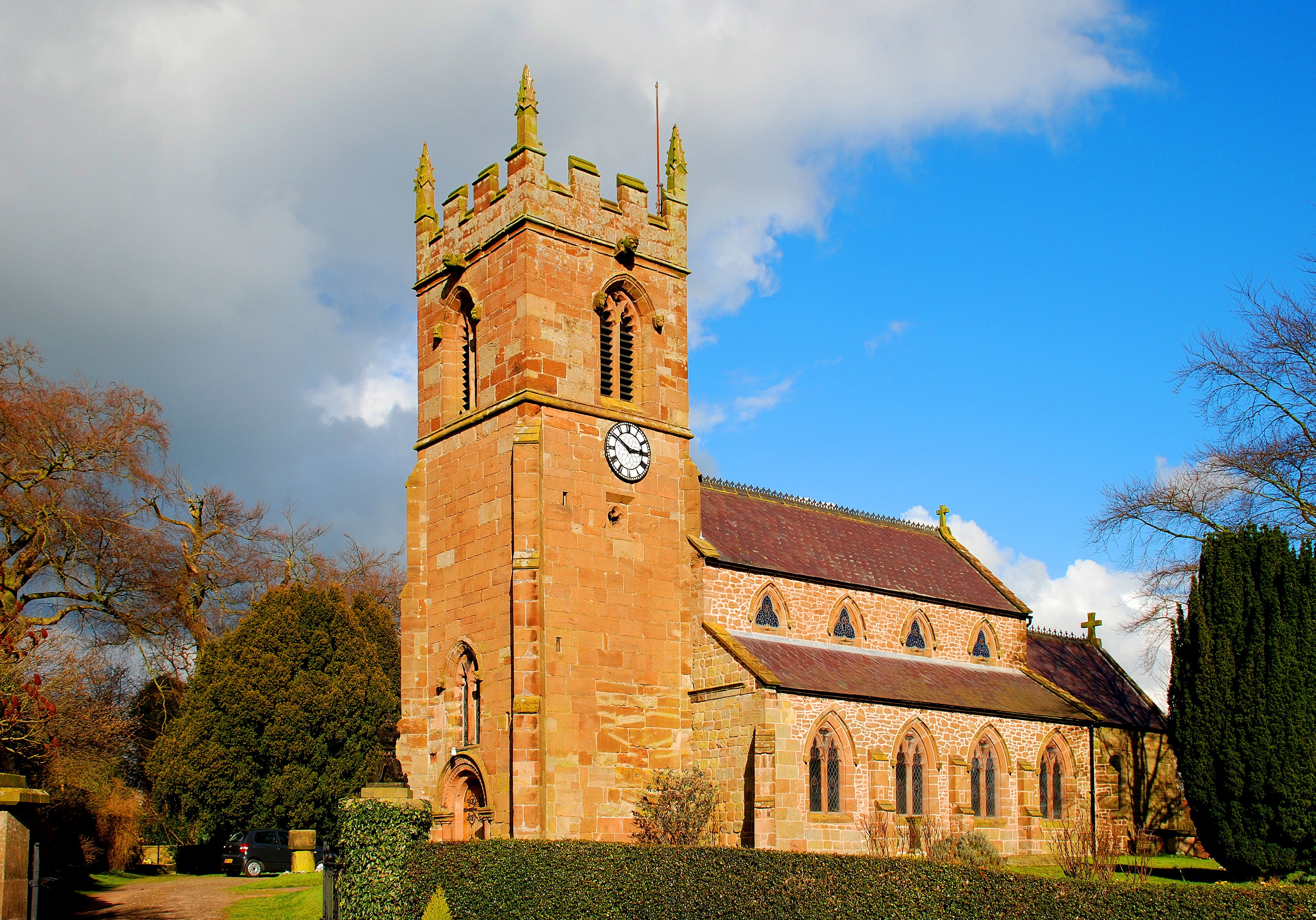
- Church of St Chad

- Location within Shropshire
- Population: 620 (2011)
- OS grid reference: SJ702386
- Civil parish: Norton in Hales
- Unitary authority: Shropshire
- Ceremonial county: Shropshire
- Region: West Midlands
- Country: England
- Sovereign state: United Kingdom
- Post town: market drayton
- Postcode district: TF9
- Dialling code: 01630
- Police: West Mercia
- Fire: Shropshire
- Ambulance: West Midlands
- UK Parliament: North Shropshire

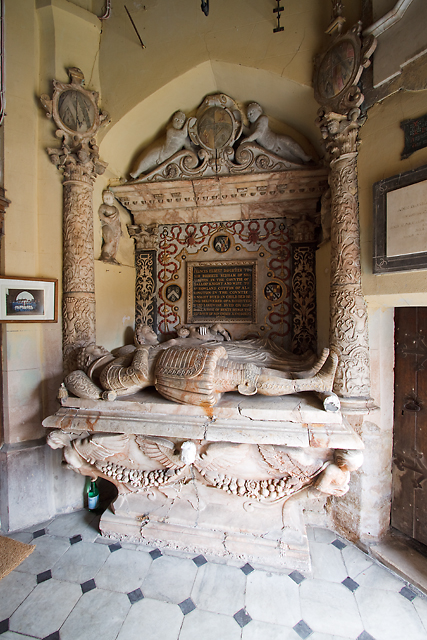
Monument to Sir Rowland Cotton and his wife in St Chad's Church, Norton in Hales

Norton in Hales is a village and civil parish in Shropshire, England. Prior to 1 April 2009, it was in North Shropshire district.

It lies on the A53 between the town of Market Drayton and Woore, Shropshire's most northeasterly village and parish.

Staffordshire is to the east of the parish and Cheshire to the west. Also within the parish is the village of Betton and hamlet of Ridgwardine.

The parish church is Saint Chad's, rebuilt in the 19th century. Also within the village are Norton in Hales Church of England Primary School, the Hind's Head Inn, and a large playing field.

The monument to Frances, Lady Cotton (d. 1606) in St Chad's was designed by Inigo Jones around the year 1611. Her husband Rowland Cotton, who commissioned the tomb, was associated with the court of Prince Henry, as was Jones. The tomb is the earliest known work of Inigo Jones.

Upon the village green near the church stands a rock known as The Brading Stone. It was said by local tradition anyone caught working after noon on Shrove Tuesday would be "bumped" upon the stone.

Tunstall Hall is a Grade II* listed building, built in about 1732, formerly a girls' school, and now a residential home offering specialist care in dementia.

The engineer Samuel Owen, who later emigrated to Sweden where he became an industrialist, was born at Norton in 1774.

The village had a railway station operating from 1870 to 1956 on a defunct line to Market Drayton of the North Staffordshire Railway.

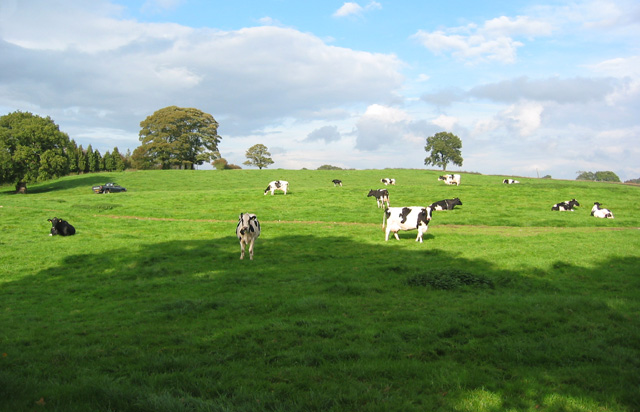
Cattle near the Hollies

== See also ==
- Listed buildings in Norton in Hales
