= Crown Street Halt railway station =

Disused railway station in Staffordshire, England

Crown Street Halt
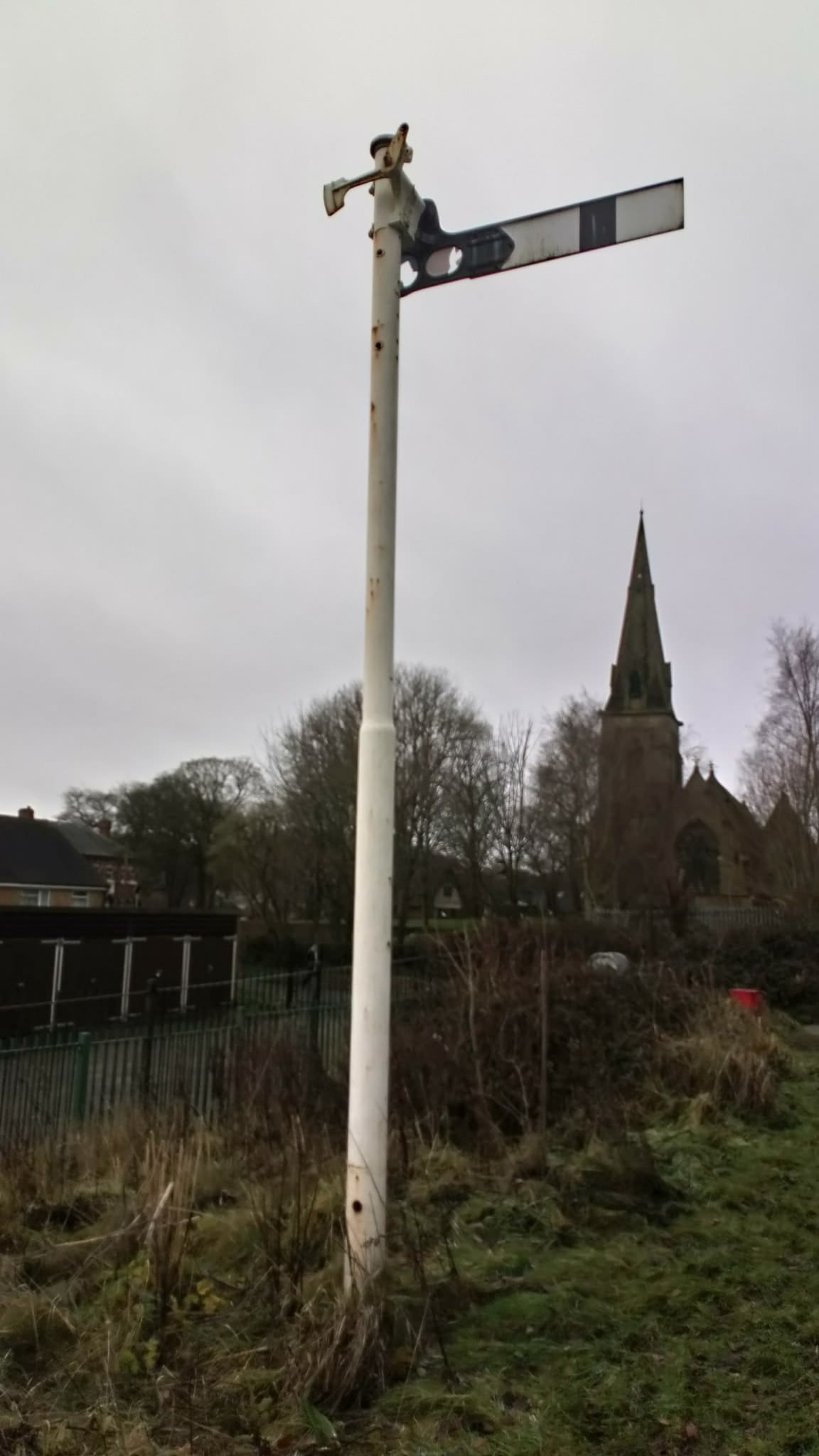
- Signal post still in situ near Crown Street Halt, the Silverdale Church can be seen behind it.

General information
- Location: Newcastle-under-Lyme, Staffordshire; England
- Coordinates: 53.0169°N 2.2658°W
- Grid reference: SJ822466
- Platforms: 2

Other information
- Status: Disused

History
- Original company: North Staffordshire Railway
- Post-grouping: London, Midland & Scottish Railway

Key dates
- 1 May 1905: Opened
- 7 June 1949: Closed
Location

Crown Street Halt railway station (also known as Silverdale (Crown Street) Halt) is a disused railway station in Staffordshire, England.

Situated on the North Staffordshire Railway (NSR) Stoke to Market Drayton Line, this halt was opened in 1905 when the NSR introduced a railmotor service between Silverdale and Trentham as a response to competition from tram companies. Situated closer to Silverdale town centre than Silverdale station, the station remained open until 1949.

== Present day ==
Nothing remains of the halt site, but a signal post is still in situ and some old fencing and the halt site is now a greenway and park.

Preceding station	Disused railways	Following station
Silverdale; Line and station closed	North Staffordshire Railway; Stoke-Market Drayton Line	Knutton Halt; Line and station closed
