= Leycett =

Village in Staffordshire, England

Coordinates: 53.0173°N 2.3063°W

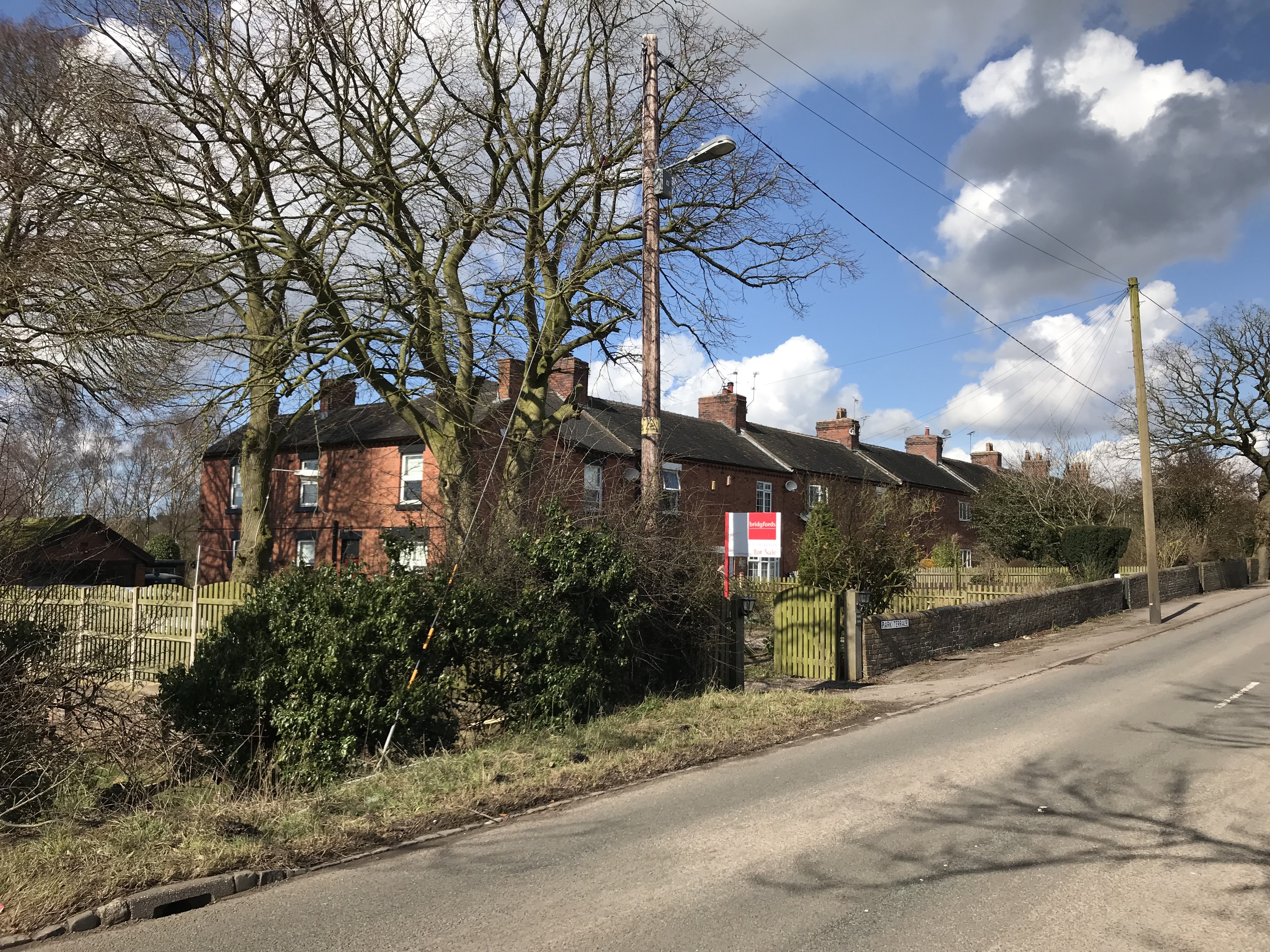
- Park Terrace - some of the remaining buildings of Leycett

- Location within Staffordshire
- OS grid reference: SJ795467
- District: Newcastle-under-Lyme
- Shire county: Staffordshire
- Region: West Midlands
- Country: England
- Sovereign state: United Kingdom
- Post town: Newcastle, Staffs
- Postcode district: ST5
- Dialling code: 01782
- Police: Staffordshire
- Fire: Staffordshire
- Ambulance: West Midlands
- UK Parliament: Newcastle-under-Lyme

Leycett is a village in the Borough of Newcastle-under-Lyme in Staffordshire, England. It was built in the late 1860s to accommodate miners and their families at the nearby collieries and coal mines. Population details as taken at the 2011 census can be found under Madeley with the name Leycett meaning 'the clearing in the woods'.

== Leycett Colliery ==
Mining in Leycett was first mentioned back in Roman times and continued into the nineteenth century which is when in 1801, a leasehold agreement was taken out for thirty three years to mine coal on land at Leycett, between John the First Lord Crewe, Walter Sneyd of Keele, Thomas Breek of Keele and James Breek of Newcastle. By 1834 local industrialist Thomas Firmstone had taken over the lease and in 1838 constructed a three and half mile tramline from the colliery to link up with the mainline at Madeley Station to help transport his coal all over the country. Leycett Collieries became known as Madeley Colliery in 1947 under The National Coal Board, until its closure in 1957. Pits included Fair Lady and Bang Up.

=== Accidents at Leycett Colliery ===
- 1871 – An explosion at Leycett Colliery killed four
- 1879 – five men and boys were killed in a pit disaster
- 1880 – sixty two men and boys are killed
- 1883 – An explosion kills six

== Other activities ==
Later on, Leycett was served by Leycett railway station, which was opened by the North Staffordshire Railway on 28 June 1880 for passengers. At its peak the village as well as having a colliery also had a miners institute, a church, a village shop with off-licence, a post office, a butcher's, the railway station as mentioned above, a doctors, a school and a recreation ground built by the miners which had a cricket and football pitch, and later tennis courts and a bowling green.

By the mid-sixties the main part of the village had been demolished after the colliery closed down in 1957 despite there still being a considerable amount of coal untouched in the area. The only buildings left standing today are the old school and School House, the railway cottages, the Station House, part of the wooden station now used as a garage, the row of houses at Park Terrace and a few cottages and farms. Where the main bulk of the Leycett community once lived in the terraced houses (Top Street, Middle Street and Bottom Street) has now completely gone and today looks similar to an orchard, although the trees there are not fruit trees.

Where once stood the miners welfare institute, now stands a Portakabin office for the recycling yard. The railway cutting and bridge adjacent to the institute are now part of the topography of the recycling yard, the former being used for landfill and the latter demolished to accomplish this.

Leycett Cricket Club, which was started by the miners of the village colliery, has been around since about 1870 and continues to this day playing in one of the top leagues in the country. Former England fast bowler Dean Headley played as a professional for the club in the North Staffs League for a season in the early days of his career. Unfortunately the football pitch, tennis court and bowling green have long since gone.

Just a short walk across the fields from the cricket ground takes you to Finney Green, where in 1970 a local farmer by the name of Ted Askey allowed his field be used to host the Hollywood Music Festival which attracted 45,000 people over the weekend with acts such as Black Sabbath, Mungo Jerry and the Grateful Dead. This was the first rock concert to be held in the northern part of Britain.
