= Listed buildings in Norton in Hales =

Norton in Hales is a village and civil parish in Shropshire, England. It contains 21 listed buildings that are recorded in the National Heritage List for England. Of these, five are at Grade II*, the middle of the three grades, and the others are at Grade II, the lowest grade. The parish contains the villages of Norton in Hales and Betton and the surrounding countryside. The Shropshire Union Canal passes through the parish; two bridges crossing it and two mileposts on the towpath are listed. In the parish are two country houses which are listed together with associated structures. The oldest listed building in the parish is a church; this is listed together with items in the churchyard. The other listed buildings are houses, farmhouses, farm buildings, and a bridge carrying a road over the River Tern.

== Key ==
Grade	Criteria
II*	Particularly important buildings of more than special interest
II	Buildings of national importance and special interest

== Buildings ==
Name and location	Photograph	Date	Notes	Grade
St Chad's Church and archway 52.94463°N 2.44264°W		13th century	The oldest part of the church is the chancel, the tower dates from the late 14th century, most of the church was restored and rebuilt in 1864–65, and the north transept and archway were added in 1872. The church is built in sandstone with slate roofs, and consists of a nave with a clerestory, north and south aisles, a north baptistry, a north transept with an attached archway, a chancel with a north vestry, and a west tower. The tower has three stages, diagonal buttresses, a clock face on the south front, gargoyles, and an embattled parapet with crocketed corner pinnacles.	II*
Churchyard cross 52.94452°N 2.44262°W	—	15th or 16th century	The cross is in the churchyard of St Chad's Church. It is in red sandstone, and has a square base and an octagonal shaft, surmounted by a 19th-century cast iron cross.	II
Betton Old Hall; 52.92692°N 2.46053°W	—	Late 16th century	A timber framed house with plaster infill on a brick plinth with a tile roof, that has been extended in brick with applied timbers. The central bay is gabled and has two storeys and an attic, and is flanked by single-story wings. The upper floor of the central bay is jettied and has a moulded bressumer, the gable is also jettied and has plain bargeboards and a finial. The windows are casements.	II
Ridgwardine Manor; 52.94047°N 2.47654°W	—	Late 16th or early 17th century	The farmhouse has been remodelled and extended. Originally timber framed, it has been largely encased and extended in red brick, and has a tile roof. There are two storeys and an attic, and the house consists of a one-bay range, with a one-bay gabled cross-wing on the left, a projecting two-bay gabled cross-wing on the right, and a further extension to the left. The gables have plain bargeboards and finials, the doorway has a moulded surround and a gabled porch, and the windows are casements.	II
Bellaport Old Hall; 52.96118°N 2.43526°W	—	Early 17th century	Part of a large house on a moated site that was largely demolished in the 19th century. It is in stone and red brick, partly rendered, and with a tile roof. It has an L-shaped plan, with a two-storey range, and a single-storey wing. The doorway has a chamfered surround, and the windows are mullioned.	II
Old font 52.94471°N 2.44283°W	—	17th century (probably)	The former font is in the churchyard of St Chad's Church. It is in grey sandstone, and has a circular stem, and a circular bowl with a moulded bottom edge.	II
Barn south of Brand Hall; 52.94129°N 2.45946°W	—	Mid 17th century	The barn is timber framed with red brick nogging on a red brick plinth, partly rebuilt and extended in red brick and with a tile roof. It has three bays, with an extension of half a bay at each end, and there is a central cart entrance.	II
Brand Hall; 52.94176°N 2.45964°W		c. 1700	A country house with a 17th-century core, that was later extended. It is in red brick with grey sandstone dressings, and some timber framing with plaster infill at the rear, and with tile roofs. It is on a chamfered plinth, with chamfered quoins, a moulded cornice, and a coped parapet with sections of balustrading. The house has two storeys and an attic, with a front of seven bays, flanked by two-storey wings, and with a rear wing. In the middle three bays are unfluted Doric pilasters, and an entablature with a triangular pediment containing a coat of arms between loops of drapery.	II*
Archway southeast of Brand Hall (north); 52.94185°N 2.45947°W	—	c. 1700	The archway is in red brick with grey sandstone dressings. It consists of an elliptical arch that has piers with plinths, chamfered quoins, and impost bands, and on the arch is an open triangular pediment.	II*
Archway southeast of Brand Hall (south); 52.94164°N 2.45960°W	—	c. 1700	The archway is in red brick with grey sandstone dressings. It consists of an elliptical arch that has piers with plinths, chamfered quoins, and impost bands, and on the arch is an open triangular pediment.	II*
Ha-ha southeast of Brand Hall; 52.94164°N 2.45871°W		Early 18th century	The ha-ha is at the end of the lawn in front of the hall and is in red sandstone with coping blocks. It is about 60 metres (200 ft) long and 1 metre (3 ft 3 in) high, and is ramped down at the ends where there are globe finials.	II
Stable block southeast of Brand Hall; 52.94145°N 2.45955°W	—	Early 18th century	The stable block is in red brick with grey sandstone dressings on a brick plinth with a chamfered sandstone top. There is a string course, and a hipped tile roof with a triangular pediment and a clock face in the tympanum. The block has two storeys and three bays. In the centre is a blocked round-headed archway, and above is an octagonal wooden cupola with a moulded base, square piers, a moulded cornice, and an ogee lead cap with a globe finial and weathervane.	II
Tunstall Hall; 52.91476°N 2.46166°W	—	c. 1732	A country house in red brick with sandstone dressings on a chamfered stone plinth, with two string courses, a moulded cornice and parapet, and a two-span hipped tile roof. There are three storeys, a front of nine bays and sides of four bays. The central doorway in the west front has a moulded architrave, pilaster strips, a frieze, and a segmental pediment on consoles. The windows are sashes with moulded architraves, those in the ground floor with triangular pediments. In the east front is a doorway with a Gibbs surround and a triangular pediment, and in the south front is a full-height, five-sided bay window.	II*
Betton House; 52.92836°N 2.46099°W	—	Mid to late 18th century	A red brick house with grey sandstone dressings on a stone plinth, with a moulded cornice and a hipped slate roof. There are three storeys and seven bays. The outer bays contain full-height bow windows with conical roofs. The central doorway has Ionic three-quarter columns, a radial fanlight, a fluted frieze, and an open triangular pediment. The windows are sashes; those in the middle bay have moulded architraves, and in the middle floor they have balustrading beneath, a frieze with paterae and a moulded cornice.	II
Chest tomb 52.94457°N 2.44248°W	—	Late 18th century	The chest tomb is in the churchyard of St Chad's Church. It is in sandstone, and has a moulded plinth, shaped corner balusters, and a moulded cornice to a flat top. There are recessed circular side and end panels, and the inscription is illegible.	II
Shifford's Bridge; 52.91036°N 2.46043°W	—	Early 19th century (probable)	The bridge carries the A53 road over the River Tern. It is in sandstone, and consists of a single wide segmental arch. The bridge has a projecting keystone on the north side, a flat string course, and curved ends on the south side.	II
Victoria Bridge; 52.91353°N 2.47854°W		1827–30	Bridge No. 65 carries Maer Lane over the Shropshire Union Canal. It is in stone with some brick, and consists of a single elliptical arch. The bridge has voussoirs, a keystone, a band, a slightly cambered parapet with coping, and square piers, also with coping.	II
Bettonwood Bridge; 52.93278°N 2.49239°W		c. 1830	Bridge No. 66 is an accommodation bridge over the Shropshire Union Canal. It is in sandstone, and consists of a single elliptical arch. The bridge is hump-backed, and has voussoirs, a flush keystone, a chamfered string course, a parapet with rounded coping, and square end piers.	II
Milepost south of Bridge No. 66; 52.92305°N 2.49070°W	—	c. 1830	The milepost is on the towpath of the Shropshire Union Canal. It is in cast iron, and consists of a cylindrical round-topped post with curved rectangular plates. The plates are inscribed with the distances in miles to Autherley Junction, Nantwich, and Norbury Junction.	II
Milepost south of Bridge No. 67; 52.93736°N 2.49182°W	—	c. 1830	The milepost is on the towpath of the Shropshire Union Canal. It is in cast iron, and consists of a cylindrical round-topped post with curved rectangular plates. The plates are inscribed with the distances in miles to Autherley Junction, Nantwich, and Norbury Junction.	II
Betton Hall Farmhouse and farm buildings 52.93334°N 2.45828°W	—	Mid 19th century	A model farm, it was extended in the 20th century. The farmhouse is in red brick on a stone plinth and has a dentilled eaves cornice, and a tile roof, two storeys, a double-depth plan, and four bays. Above the door is a fanlight, and the windows are sashes. The farm buildings are in red brick with dressings in blue brick and limestone, and most roofs are tiled. Adjoining the house is a single-storey range. The other buildings are separate and form a T-shaped plan; they include loose-box stables, cow houses and a milking parlour.	II
