= Listed buildings in Woore =

Buildings in Woore that are recorded in the National Heritage List for England

Woore is a civil parish in Shropshire, England. It contains ten listed buildings that are recorded in the National Heritage List for England. All the listed buildings are designated at Grade II, the lowest of the three grades, which is applied to "buildings of national importance and special interest". The parish contains the villages of Woore, Bearstone, and Dorrington and smaller settlements, and is otherwise rural. The listed buildings consist of houses and farmhouses, a church, a former baptismal font in the churchyard, a bridge, and a milepost.

== Buildings ==
Name and location	Photograph	Date	Notes
Bearstone Grange; 52.95437°N 2.41186°W	—	Mid 16th century	A farmhouse, later a private house, that was altered and extended in the 19th century. The older part is timber framed with painted brick infill on a sandstone plinth, the rebuilding is in red brick, and the roof is slated. There are two storeys and an L-shaped plan, consisting of a two-bay hall range and a three-bay gabled projecting cross-wing. The upper storey at the front and the gable of the cross-wing are jettied with a moulded bressumer, and the gable has plain bargeboards and a finial. In the angle is a flat-roofed porch with a coped parapet. The ground floor contains a canted bay window, and the other windows are casements.
Dorrington Hall Farmhouse; 52.96680°N 2.41242°W	—	Late 16th or early 17th century	The farmhouse was partly rebuilt, altered and extended in the 19th century. The earlier part is timber framed with plastered infill, it has been refaced or rebuilt in red brick, and has a tile roof. There are two storeys and an attic, and the farmhouse consists of a two-bay hall range, a two-bay projecting gabled cross-wing, and a stair wing and a later wing at the rear. In the angle is a lean-to porch, and there are two canted bay windows. The other windows are casements.
The Tudor House; 52.97714°N 2.40237°W	—	Early 17th century	A house, later a shop, it was remodelled in 1905. There is a timber framed core with plastered infill on a painted sandstone plinth, with planted timbers and a tile roof. There are two storeys and an attic, a front of two bays, and a two-storey rear wing. In the ground floor is a shop front extending around the corner, to the right is a gabled porch with a Tudor archway and a date in the spandrels, and to the right of this is a canted bay window. In the upper floor are casement windows, and the gable in the left return has pierced bargeboards and finials.
Former font 52.97797°N 2.40291°W	—	1636	The former font in the churchyard of St Leonard's Church has been converted into a memorial. It is in sandstone, it is octagonal, and it consists of a tapering stem on a square base with a panelled tapered bowl. On the top is a later pyramidal cap with a polyhedral finial, and on the bowl is an inscription.
Gravenhunger Hall and outbuilding 52.97354°N 2.39268°W	—	Mid 17th century	The house was later altered and extended. The earlier part is in rendered timber framing, it has been refaced, rebuilt and extended in red brick, and has a tile roof, hipped over the front block. The earlier part has two storeys and an attic and an L-shaped plan with three bays, and the front block has two storeys and five bays. At right angles to the rear is a 17th-century outbuilding that is timber-framed and largely rebuilt in red brick. Most of the windows are sashes, and there are bay windows.
Oak Farmhouse; 52.96430°N 2.40121°W	—	Mid 17th century	The farmhouse, which was remodelled in the 19th century, is timber framed and rendered, on a painted stone plinth, and it has a tile roof. There are two storeys and an attic, and a partial basement. The farmhouse has an L-shaped plan, with a two-bay hall range, and a two-bay gabled cross-wing on the left. In the centre is a gabled porch and a doorway with a segmental head, and the windows are casements.
Woore Manor; 52.97716°N 2.40355°W	—	Early 19th century	A red brick house on a rendered plinth, with a string course, a moulded eaves cornice, and a hipped slate roof. There are two storeys and a basement, five bays, a two-storey rear wing, and a later block in the angle. The central doorway has an Ionic doorcase with reeded columns, sections of entablature, an open triangular pediment, and a radial fanlight. The windows are sashes, and on the left return is a sundial. The rear wing has two flat-topped dormers with globe finials.
St Leonard's Church; 52.97813°N 2.40273°W		1830–32	The chancel was reconstructed in 1887 and the tower was added in 1910. The church is built in stuccoed brick with a slate roof, and consists of a nave, a small chancel, a north vestry, and a west tower. The tower has three stages, the bottom stage consisting of a three-bay porch containing a doorway with a triangular pediment. In the middle stage is a clock face on the west side and circular windows one the other sides. The top stage contains round-headed louvred bell openings with keystones. Above this is a moulded eaves cornice and a pyramidal slate cap with a cross finial.
Bearstone Bridge; 52.94708°N 2.40994°W		1836	The bridge carries the B5026 road over the River Tern. It is in sandstone and consists of a single segmental arch with stepped voussoirs. The bridge has a flat string course with a chamfered top, and a parapet with chamfered coping. At the ends are octagonal piers with pyramidal caps.
Milepost on Bearstone Bridge; 52.94699°N 2.40983°W	—	Mid to late 19th century	The milepost is on the east side of the B5026 road. It is in cast iron, and has a triangular section and a chamfered top. At the top it is inscribed "WINNINGTON", and below are the distances in miles to Eccleshall, Stafford, Knighton, Pipegate, Woore, and Nantwich.
