= Hartshill and Basford Halt railway station =

Disused railway station in Staffordshire, England

Hartshill and Basford Halt

General information
- Location: Hartshill, Stoke-on-Trent, Staffordshire; England
- Coordinates: 53.0131°N 2.2056°W
- Grid reference: SJ863462
- Platforms: 1

Other information
- Status: Disused

History
- Original company: North Staffordshire Railway
- Post-grouping: London, Midland and Scottish Railway

Key dates
- 1 May 1905: Opened
- 20 Sept 1926: Closed
Location

Hartshill and Basford Halt was a railway station located between the Stoke-on-Trent and Newcastle-under-Lyme stations on the Market Drayton branch of the North Staffordshire Railway, approx 1.5 miles (2.4 km) east of Newcastle.

It closed in 1926 three years after the North Staffordshire Railway was succeeded by the London Midland and Scottish Railway or LMS for short until the line to Newcastle under Lyme closed in 1964-5.

== Present day ==
The tunnel between Newcastle-Under-Lyme and Hartshill and Basford Halt has been filled in and built on by housing and small commercial units but in the park area where the tunnel used to be at what leads to Newcastle under Lyme the trackbed what still exists is a footpath that many walkers and dog walkers pass on by as well as the children's playground with a skateboarding, a basketball area and some mini gym equipment as well.

Preceding station	Disused railways	Following station
Newcastle-under-Lyme; Line closed, station closed	North Staffordshire Railway; Stoke-Market Drayton Line	Stoke on Trent; Line closed, station open
