= Ireland's Cross =

Hamlet in Shropshire, England

Coordinates: 52.969°N 2.396°W

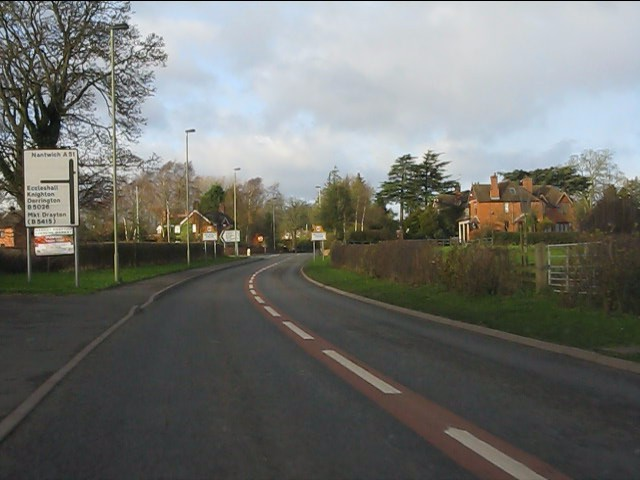
- A51 approaching Ireland's Cross

- Location within Shropshire
- OS grid reference: SJ734414
- Civil parish: Woore
- Unitary authority: Shropshire
- Ceremonial county: Shropshire
- Region: West Midlands
- Country: England
- Sovereign state: United Kingdom
- Post town: CREWE
- Postcode district: CW3
- Dialling code: 01630
- Police: West Mercia
- Fire: Shropshire
- Ambulance: West Midlands
- UK Parliament: North Shropshire

Ireland's Cross is a small hamlet in the civil parish of Woore in Shropshire, England.
