= Woore =

Village in Shropshire, England

Coordinates: 52.977°N 2.402°W

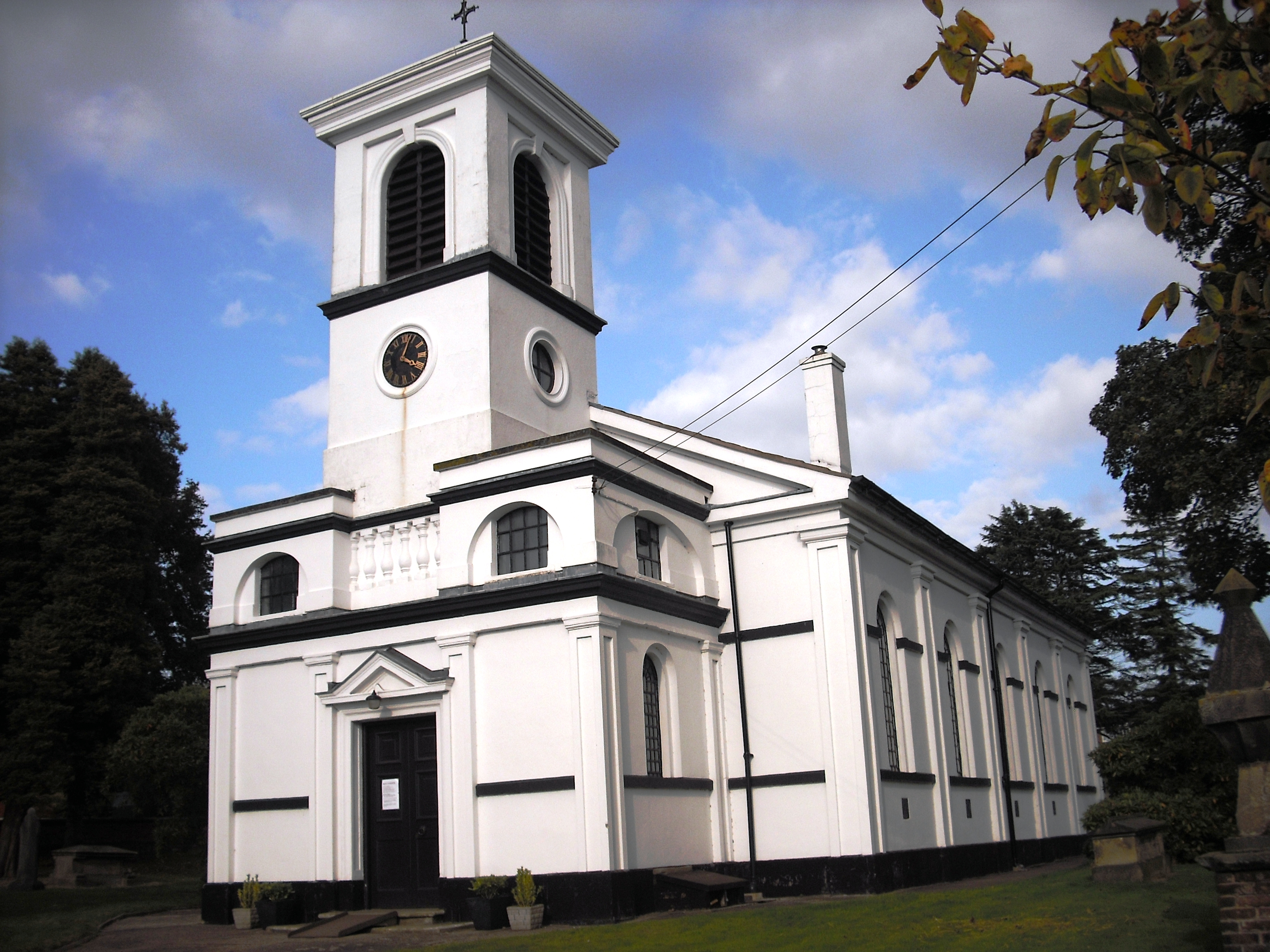
- St Leonard's Church, built c. 1830-31

- Location within Shropshire
- Population: 633 (2011)
- OS grid reference: SJ730422
- Civil parish: Woore
- Unitary authority: Shropshire
- Ceremonial county: Shropshire
- Region: West Midlands
- Country: England
- Sovereign state: United Kingdom
- Post town: CREWE
- Postcode district: CW3
- Dialling code: 01630
- Police: West Mercia
- Fire: Shropshire
- Ambulance: West Midlands
- UK Parliament: North Shropshire
- Website: Parish Council

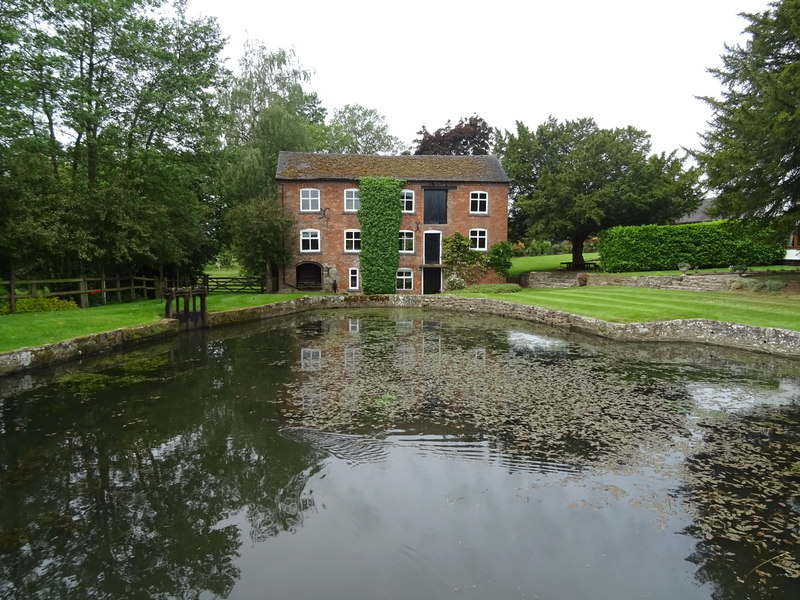
Bearstone Mill

Woore (/wʊər/ w-oor) is a village and civil parish in the north east of Shropshire, England. The population of the village as recorded in the 2011 census is 633, and for the civil parish is 1,069. The civil parish extends to about 3,950 acres (1,600 hectares).

== Etymology ==
The name means "boundary" in ancient Celtic or Anglo-Saxon ("Oure"), and this fits nicely with the fact that it is on the boundary with both the counties of Cheshire and Staffordshire. The parish is the most northerly in Shropshire.

== Location ==
The nearest significant towns to Woore are Market Drayton, Whitchurch, Newcastle-under-Lyme, Nantwich and Crewe. The A51 and A525 roads run through the village, crossing each other, the A51 being the old London - Chester post road. (Changes of horses used to be available at the former Swan Inn, now flats, in the centre of Woore itself.) The only road links between Woore and the rest of Shropshire pass through adjoining counties. The village is also the farthest place in Shropshire from the centre of the county near Cantlop.

== History ==
The Domesday Book (1086) entry for Woore (“Waure”) shows that the manor was held not from Earl Roger of Shrewsbury, but as a tenant-in-chief from the King, by William Malbedeng (William Malbank), and contained a large hall within the moated site at what is now Syllenhurst Farm. Lying in the Hundred of Hodnet, there were 5 households in Woore itself, the value of which to the Lord was assessed for tax at 5 shillings, with woodland for 60 pigs. William Malbank also held land at Dorrington (2 households with land for 3 ploughlands, woodland for 100 pigs, valued at 4 shillings), Gravenhunger (2 households with land for 4 ploughlands, valued at 6 shillings) and Onneley (no households, valued at less than 2 shillings). He had succeeded a pre-Conquest Saxon Lord, Edric. In later medieval times the most notable family of Woore was the de Bulkeleys.

=== Racecourse ===
The village had a National Hunt racecourse until 1963, served by Pipe Gate railway station in the south of the parish, which was closed under the Beeching "Axe".

== Modern day ==
The village today is mostly residential with a number of small shops, centred on the Post Office and general stores on the village square. One public house services the village, along with one modern red brick primary school and two churches, the smaller of which is a Methodist church, popularly known as "the Chapel on the corner", and the larger of which is St. Leonard's Church of England parish church.

Woore Cricket Club play at the Falcon Field in the village, which slopes downwards dramatically from the Pavilion and Falcon Inn sides.

Bridgemere Garden World is to the north of Woore, just over the border in Cheshire.

== St Leonard's Church ==
St. Leonard's church was constructed in about 1830–31, to serve what were then five townships of the Shropshire portion of the ancient parish of Mucklestone in Staffordshire, and is of an unconventional white plaster Italianate design. A Grade II listed building, it was repainted in 2011. Designed by George Hamilton of Stone, the bell tower is an Edwardian addition by Chapman and Snape of Newcastle-under-Lyme. The tower has not been safe to regularly ring in since the late 1980s, with the bells now replaced by a timed recording. The churchyard contains a war grave of a British soldier of World War I.

== Transport ==
Woore no longer has bus services. It was previously served by a bus connecting the village with Hanley and Nantwich, however the service ceased in 2015. Now the nearby village of Buerton has bus links to Nantwich, Whitchurch (Shropshire) and Audlem as does also the village of Madeley (Staffordshire) which provides links to Newcastle-under-Lyme, Crewe and Stoke-on-Trent.

There is no railway station in Woore but there was a station in the village of Pipe Gate which was on the now-closed Stoke to Market Drayton Line. The station closed in 1956 along with the section to Market Drayton but the line from Silverdale to Pipe Gate remained open to serve both a creamery and as a loop back to the mainline at Madeley Chord until 1998 when the entire line closed after closure of Silverdale Colliery. The line has been mothballed and the bridge demolished. The station master's house survives as a private residence but the station site is now a timber yard. Part of the embankment is still present but the section towards Market Drayton is built on by a new housing development. This does not however hinder possible future proposals for reopening of the line.

== Notable residents ==
- John Boydell (1720-1804) master engraver and Lord Mayor of London, born at Dorrington Hall in the parish
- William Bridges Adams (1797–1872) author, locomotive engineer and inventor of the Adams axle
- Albert Lightfoot (1936–2023) a cricketer for Northamptonshire
- John Lawton (1936 at Woore–2017) footballer, played 9 games for Stoke City F.C
- Nick Hancock (born 1962) TV personality owned a £1.1m mansion near Woore

== Civil parish ==
The civil parish includes several other hamlets and villages including Gravenhunger, Dorrington, Pipe Gate, Bearstone, part of Onneley (the remainder being in the neighbouring Staffordshire Parish of Madeley) and Ireland's Cross. The parish council has 10 elected members, and normally meets monthly, on the first Monday of the month.

Woore is within Market Drayton East ward for elections to Shropshire Council.

== See also ==
- Listed buildings in Woore
