= Pipe Gate railway station =

Former railway station in England

Pipe Gate
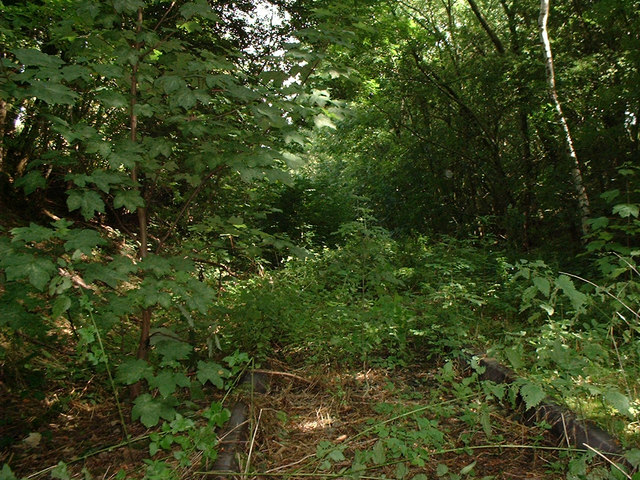
- Old railway line still in place near Pipe Gate station, September 2007

General information
- Location: Pipe Gate, Shropshire; England
- Coordinates: 52.9643°N 2.3933°W
- Grid reference: SJ680115

Other information
- Status: Disused

History
- Original company: North Staffordshire Railway
- Post-grouping: London, Midland and Scottish Railway

Key dates
- 1 February 1870: Opened
- 7 May 1956: Closed
Location

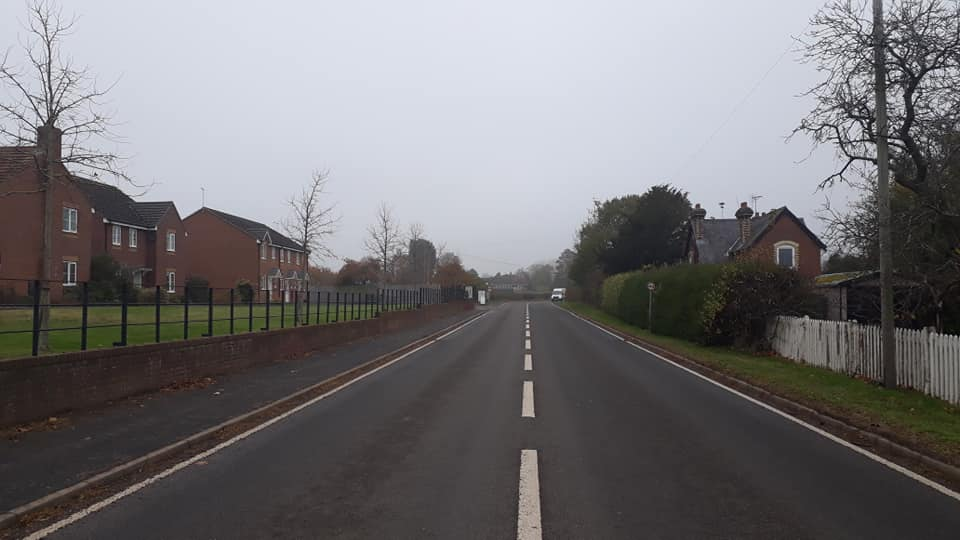
The former level crossing at Pipe Gate in November 2018, (Station masters house is on the right) and the former station site is on the left near the houses.

Pipe Gate was a railway station on the North Staffordshire Railway's Stoke to Market Drayton Line.

== Construction ==
Construction was started on the Newcastle-under-Lyme to Silverdale Junction line on 29 July 1864, and the first train ran on 1 February 1870.

The station served the hamlet of Pipe Gate, which is part of the parish of Woore, Shropshire. It was hence named Pipe Gate (for Woore). Trains from the station ran from Stoke on Trent, to junction with the Great Western Railway at Market Drayton. On grouping in 1923 it was absorbed into the London Midland and Scottish Railway.

== Passenger services ==
The early years of the 20th century were the busiest, with thirteen trains daily from Stoke to Silverdale and five to Market Drayton. Railmotor services began in 1905, intended to compete with trams and were somewhat successful in this respect, although they only lasted until 1926. The station also served Woore Racecourse which opened at Pipe Gate in 1885.

The section between Silverdale and Pipe Gate was reduced to single track in October 1934. Dwindling passenger numbers after World War II meant that there were only two trains daily from Stoke to Market Drayton, and all passenger services ceased on 7 May 1956.

== Freight traffic ==
Express Dairies had a creamery with private siding access to the station, allowing its preferred transport partner the GWR to provide milk trains to the facility, for onward scheduling to London. In 1962 a new "chord" line was opened at Madeley to provide a connection to the West Coast Main Line. This was used as a diversionary route when the Harecastle diversion line was being constructed and continued in use for freight work once the latter was completed. After the closure of the creamery in Spring 1965, the route between Market Drayton and Madeley Chord closed under the Beeching Axe in 1966.

== Today ==
A large amount of rail still exists on the eastern edge of the former and now demolished station, running back towards Silverdale. The station master's house survives as a private residence but the station site is now a timber yard. Part of the embankment is still present but the section towards Market Drayton is built on by a new housing development.

Preceding station	Disused railways	Following station
Madeley Road; Line and station closed	North Staffordshire Railway; Stoke to Market Drayton Line	Norton-in-Hales; Line and station closed
