= Woore Racecourse =

Horse racing venue in Woore, England

- Location: Woore, Shropshire
- Coordinates: 52.96°N 2.39°W
- Owned by: Defunct
- Date closed: 1 June 1963
- Course type: National Hunt
- Notable races: Woore Chase, Foxhunters Open Chase, Betton Hurdle

Woore Racecourse (closed 1963) was an English National Hunt horse racing venue, situated in the village of Woore, in the northernmost corner of Shropshire, on the border with Cheshire and Staffordshire.

== Layout ==
The racecourse was founded near the hamlet of Pipe Gate, on farmland owned by Mr Icke and leased to the racecourse company. The middle of the track was located at 52°58'07.3"N 2°24'25.2"W (52.968689, -2.406994) and the grandstand at grid reference SJ733413. The track was a mile round, with very sharp left hand bends. Horses had to gallop over a bridge between the last two jumps. As the course was constantly turning, it paid to be close to the rails. According to former jockey, Bernard Wells, it felt "as though you were going round on the inside of a saucepan." Since the course was also used for grazing, it was regularly covered with cow pats, an unpleasant experience for the jockeys who would be covered by it; low-hanging branches also made riding difficult for jockeys.

== History ==
Races are first recorded at Woore in 1883. The original site proved unsuitable, however, and in 1885, races were held for the first time at Pipe Gate. Early meetings were funded through the subscriptions of local farmers and huntsmen, but in 1905, a racecourse company was formed to manage the business.

Woore had its most successful period between the World Wars, when, despite the existence of just a single, wooden grandstand, the meeting became popular with National Hunt fans, sometimes drawing crowds in excess of 1500. In 1937, King George VI attended to watch his horse, Slam, take part in the Betton Hurdle, in which it finished fourth.

By the end of World War II, Woore held three meetings a year, and in 1952, a fourth meeting was added. Nearby Mucklestone held point-to-point meetings and it was common for racegoers to attend the Mucklestone meeting on Easter Saturday and the Woore meeting on Easter Monday, when, often, the same horses would run again.

The nearby Pipe Gate railway station, opened 1870, provided access to the course. However, when passenger services to this station stopped in 1956, attendance at Woore became more difficult. Despite this expansion of the course continued. In 1957, buildings from Bedford Aerodrome were acquired and converted to stewards' rooms, a weighing room and a restaurant.

== Closure ==
The final meeting was held on 1 June 1963, although it was not known it would be the last meeting at the time. 3,996 paid through the turnstiles to attend, just over 1,000 in the 16 shilling Tattersalls enclosure, the rest in the 4 shilling enclosure. Terry Biddlecombe won the opening race of the final meeting, and Reg Hollinshead the last – the only race on the card not won by the favourite.

The Levy Board had announced a couple of months previously that it would be withdrawing funding from Woore, along with several other courses. This left the course in a precarious financial situation. Nevertheless, the lease on the course was not set to expire until 1965, so it was originally hoped that racing could continue. Accordingly, three one-day meetings were scheduled for 1964.

The problem for the course was that one of the scheduled meetings was for Easter Saturday. This clashed with the Mucklestone point-to-point meeting run by North Staffordshire Hunt. When the hunt were refused permission to postpone, they instead bought the entire assets of Woore racecourse and sold them off, thus bringing racing at Woore to a close.

Today, very little remains to suggest the existence of a racecourse. Part of the racecourse stable block survived until 2005 as a livestock barn, until it burnt down. The land is now used by Bearstone Stud breeding operation, maintaining the Thoroughbred racing link to the area.

== Significant events ==
The leading jockey at the course was Stan Mellor. Dick Francis, the jockey and author, had his first ride at Woore in 1946 on a horse called Russian Hero, as did commentator Brough Scott, on 21 March 1963, riding a filly called Tamhill. Jockeys to win their first race at the course were Tim Brookshaw, Reg Hollinshead and Bernard Wells.
