= Ridgwardine =

Hamlet in Shropshire, England

Coordinates: 52.939°N 2.477°W

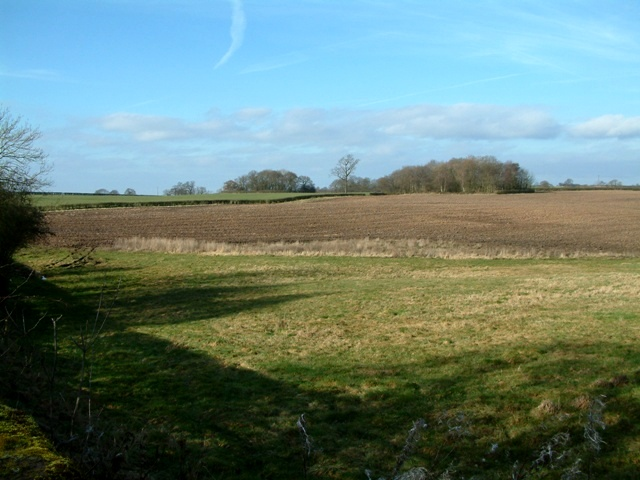
- Farmland at Ridgwardine

- Location within Shropshire
- OS grid reference: SJ680381
- Civil parish: Norton in Hales
- Unitary authority: Shropshire
- Ceremonial county: Shropshire
- Region: West Midlands
- Country: England
- Sovereign state: United Kingdom
- Post town: MARKET DRAYTON
- Postcode district: TF9
- Dialling code: 01630
- Police: West Mercia
- Fire: Shropshire
- Ambulance: West Midlands
- UK Parliament: North Shropshire

Ridgwardine is a small hamlet in Shropshire in the civil parish of Norton in Hales. It is made up of Ridgwardine Manor, Upper Farm, and Manor Farm.
