= John Lawton (footballer) =

English footballer

Personal information
- Full name: John Kenneth Lawton
- Date of birth: 6 July 1936
- Place of birth: Woore, England
- Date of death: 12 August 2017 (aged 81)
- Position: Forward

Senior career*
| Years | Team | Apps | (Gls) |
| 1951–1955 | Crewe Alexandra | 0 | (0) |
| 1955–1956 | Stoke City | 9 | (3) |
- Winsford United
- * Club domestic league appearances and goals

John Kenneth Lawton (6 July 1936 – 12 August 2017) was an English footballer who played in the Football League for Stoke City.

== Career ==
Lawton was born in Woore, and played for Crewe Alexandra before joining Stoke City in 1955. He spent the 1955–56 season at Stoke where he played nine times scoring three goals which came in three straight home league matches against Hull City, Plymouth Argyle and Lincoln City in September 1955. He left at the end of the season and played for his next team Winsford United.

== Career statistics ==
Appearances and goals by club, season and competition
| Club | Season | League | | | FA Cup | | Total | |
| Club | Season | Division | Apps | Goals | Apps | Goals | Apps | Goals |
|---|---|---|---|---|---|---|---|---|
| Stoke City | 1955–56 | Second Division | 9 | 3 | 0 | 0 | 9 | 3 |
| Career total | | | 9 | 3 | 0 | 0 | 9 | 3 |
