= Norton-in-Hales railway station =

Railway station

Norton-in-Hales
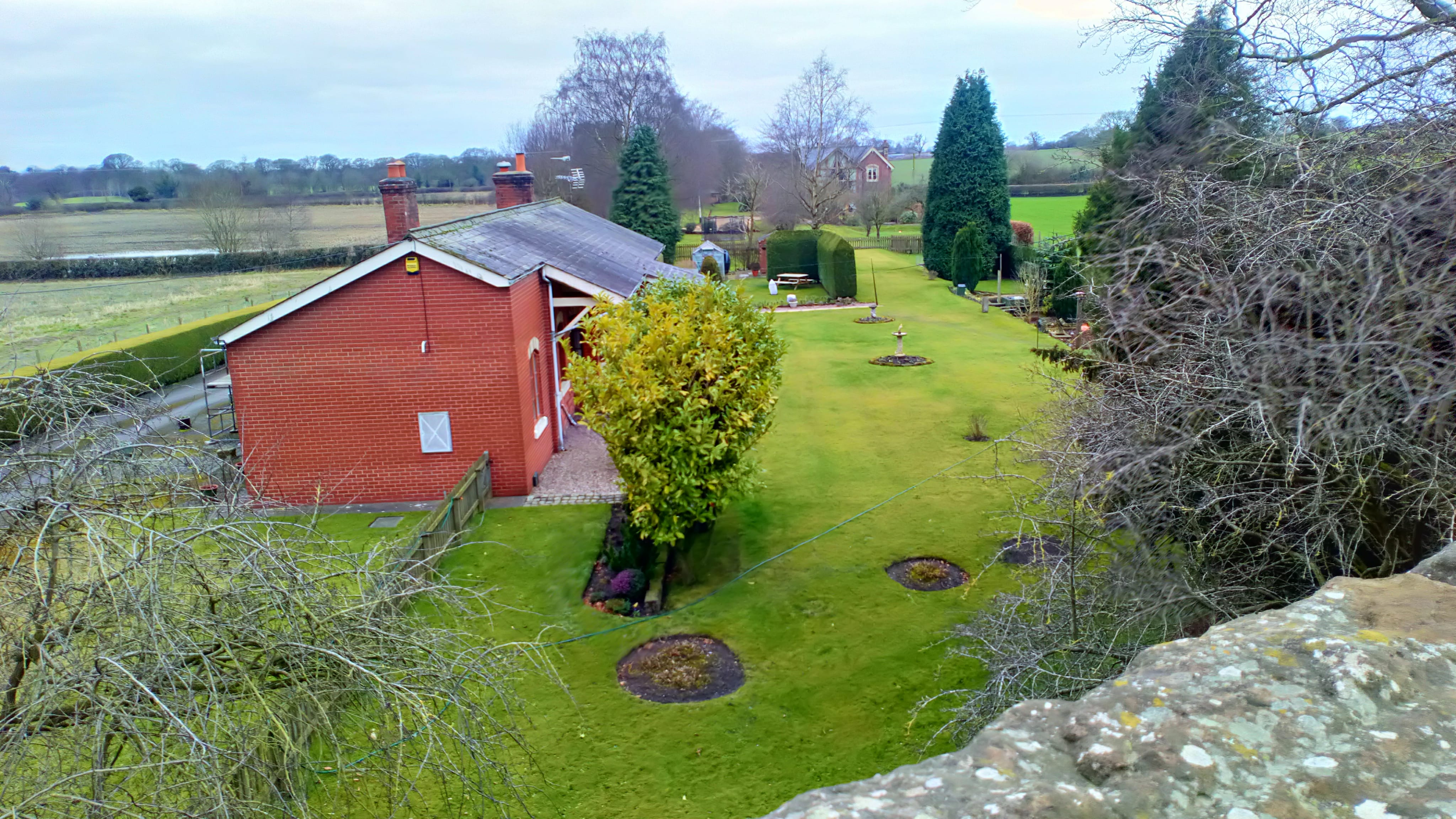
- The former station at Norton-In-Hales in January 2018, now a private residence.

General information
- Location: Norton-in-Hales, Shropshire; England
- Coordinates: 52.9473°N 2.4483°W
- Grid reference: SJ698390
- Platforms: 2

Other information
- Status: Disused

History
- Original company: North Staffordshire Railway
- Post-grouping: London, Midland and Scottish Railway

Key dates
- 1 February 1870: Opened
- 7 May 1956: Closed
Location

Norton-in-Hales railway station was a station on the North Staffordshire Railway between Stoke-on-Trent and Market Drayton. The station was opened in 1870 and was closed in 1956. The station building and trackbed is now a private residence including the station masters house.

Preceding station	Disused railways	Following station
Market Drayton; Line and station closed	North Staffordshire Railway; Stoke to Market Drayton Line	Pipe Gate; Line and station closed
