= Tim Brookshaw =

Tim Brookshaw (25 March 1929 - 8 November 1981) was a National Hunt jockey who was champion jockey in 1958/1959.

Stanley James Brookshaw, always known as Tim, was born into a Shropshire farming family and started his career as a jockey with Cheshire trainer George Owen. He rode his first winner at Woore Racecourse in 1948. He was champion jockey in the 1958/1959 season, with 83 winners. In the 1959 Grand National he came second on Wyndbergh, having broken a stirrup after Becher's Brook on the second circuit and completed the course riding without stirrups. His 550 winners included Pappageno's Cottage in the 1963 Scottish Grand National.

In December 1963 Brookshaw sustained injuries that were to end his career as a jockey when Lucky Dora ran out at the fifth hurdle in a race at Aintree. The horse was fatally injured and Brookshaw was left partially paralysed. A fund was set up by John Oaksey to support Brookshaw and fellow jockey Paddy Farrell who had also sustained a spinal injury; this eventually became the Injured Jockeys Fund.

Brookshaw participated in the 1964 Summer Paralympics in Tokyo, competing in javelin and weightlifting. After a while some feeling returned to his hips and knees, although not to his feet, and he was able to walk with sticks. He also started riding again on his dairy farm in Tern Hill, Shropshire, and took out a trainer's licence, training his first winner, Dufton Pike at Wolverhampton, in 1967.

Brookshaw died at Oswestry Orthopaedic Hospital, five days after a fall from a horse at his farm, in which he broke two neck bones, in November 1981 aged 52. He left his wife Joyce, a son and a daughter. He was buried at Hodnet parish church on 12 November.

Brookshaw's brother Peter was an amateur jockey who won the Foxhunters Chase at Aintree in 1950, and his nephew Steve Brookshaw trained the 1997 Grand National winner Lord Gyllene.
