= Brampton Halt railway station =

Disused railway station in Staffordshire, England

Brampton Halt
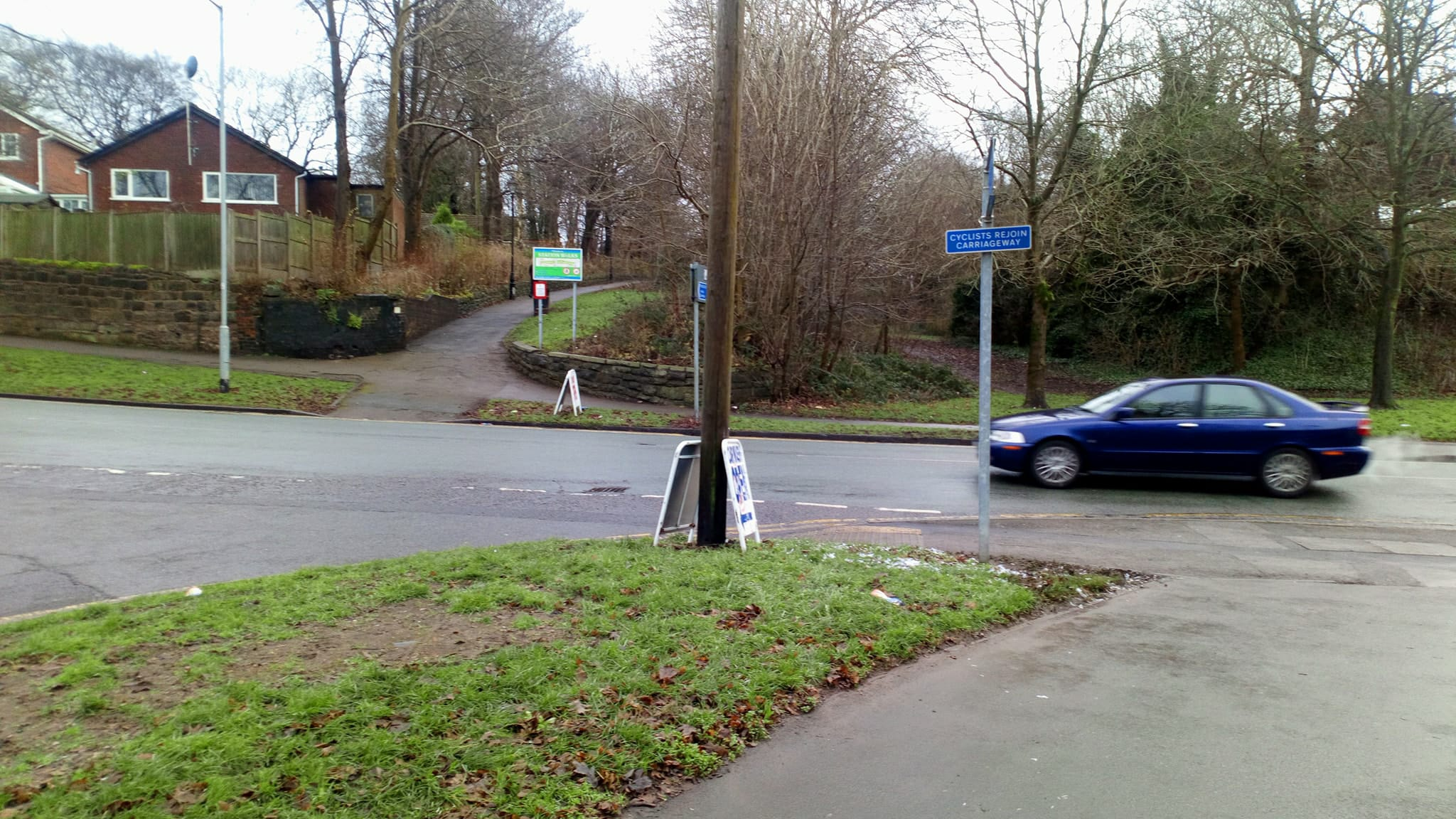
- Brampton Halt looking towards Newcastle-Under-Lyme railway station, now in use as Brampton Sidings Industrial Estate.

General information
- Location: Newcastle-under-Lyme, Staffordshire, Newcastle-under-Lyme; England
- Coordinates: 53.0156°N 2.2264°W
- Grid reference: SJ849465

Other information
- Status: Disused

History
- Pre-grouping: North Staffordshire Railway

Key dates
- 1 May 1905: Opened
- 2 April 1923: Closed
Location

Brampton Halt railway station was a railway station located in the Brampton area of Newcastle-under-Lyme, Staffordshire, England. It was opened by the North Staffordshire Railway (NSR) in 1905 but was short-lived, closing in April 1923, just prior to the amalgamation of the NSR into the London, Midland & Scottish Railway.

== Present day ==
It is now realigned for road usage and the former site is now lost under Brampton Sidings Industrial Estate.

Preceding station	Disused railways	Following station
Liverpool Road Halt; Line closed, station closed	North Staffordshire Railway; Stoke-Market Drayton Line	Newcastle-under-Lyme; Line closed, station closed

== Links to pictures ==
Pictures of Level Crossing near to the former station
