= Madeley Road railway station =

Former railway station in Staffordshire, England

Madeley Road

General information
- Location: Borough of Newcastle-under-Lyme, Staffordshire, England
- Coordinates: 52.9771°N 2.3344°W
- Grid reference: SJ776422
- Platforms: 2

Other information
- Status: Disused

History
- Original company: North Staffordshire Railway
- Post-grouping: London, Midland & Scottish Railway

Key dates
- October 1870: Opened as Madeley
- May 1871: Renamed Madeley Manor
- August 1871: Renamed Madeley Road
- 20 July 1931: Closed
Location

Madeley Road railway station served the area of Madeley, in Staffordshire, England, between 1870 and 1931.

== History ==
The Stoke to Market Drayton Line was opened by the North Staffordshire Railway (NSR) in 1870; the station called simply Madeley was opened on the line in the same year. Within a few months, the station was renamed Madeley Manor; this was possibly to avoid confusion with the LNWR station that was, at least, on the edge of Madeley. It was so named after the nearby abandoned house of Madeley Old Manor. By August 1871, the name had been changed again to Madeley Road.

The station had no goods facilities and, due to its rural location, passenger use was low. In 1931, the London, Midland and Scottish Railway (LMS) closed the station. The station's low usage is indicated by the LMS estimate that only £92 per year was saved by its closure.

The line through the station remained in use until the closure of Silverdale Colliery in 1998.

| Preceding station | Disused railways | Following station |
|---|---|---|
| Keele; Line closed, station closed | North Staffordshire Railway; Stoke to Market Drayton Line | Pipe Gate; Line closed, station closed |

== The site today ==
The station building is no longer extant. The tracks between Silverdale and Pipe Gate, including at Madeley Road, remain in place but are overgrown and out of use.
