= Liverpool Road Halt railway station =

Disused railway station in Staffordshire, England

Liverpool Road Halt
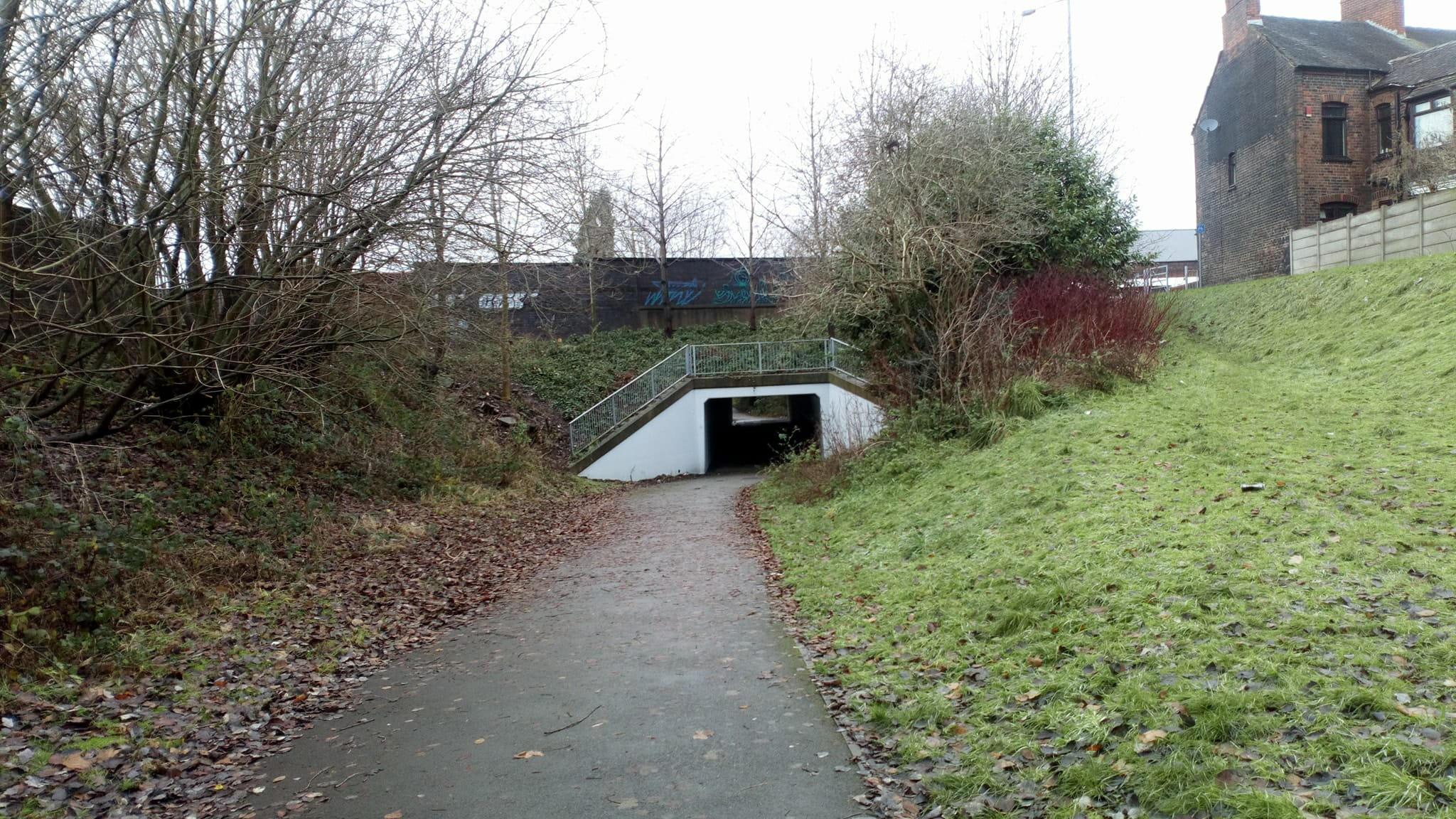
- Liverpool Road Halt, now part of a greenway and pedestrian underpass.

General information
- Location: Newcastle-under-Lyme, Staffordshire, Newcastle-under-Lyme; England
- Coordinates: 53.0171°N 2.2297°W
- Grid reference: SJ846466
- Platforms: 2

Other information
- Status: Disused

History
- Original company: North Staffordshire Railway
- Post-grouping: London, Midland and Scottish Railway; London Midland Region of British Railways

Key dates
- 1 May 1905: Opened
- 2 March 1964: Closed
Location

Liverpool Road Halt railway station was a railway station located in the north of Newcastle-under-Lyme, Staffordshire, England. It was opened in 1905 by the North Staffordshire Railway in connection with the introduction of railmotor services.

The station had two short wooden platforms and was accessed via steps leading down from an overbridge on Liverpool Road, which now forms part of the A34.

Unlike most of the other halts on the line it survived until the withdrawal of passenger services in 1964. Although the platforms are long gone, the trackbed can still be followed.

== Present day ==
The site of the halt now occupied by a pedestrian underpass.

Preceding station	Disused railways	Following station
Knutton Halt; Line and station closed	North Staffordshire Railway; Stoke-Market Drayton Line	Brampton Halt; Line and station closed
