= Betton, Shropshire =

Hamlet in Shropshire, England

Coordinates: 52.9251°N 2.4623°W

Betton
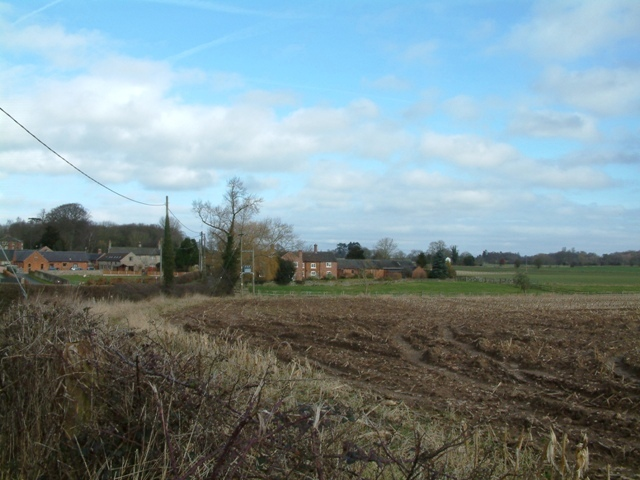
- Betton village viewed from the south

- Location within Shropshire
- OS grid reference: SJ689365
- Civil parish: Norton in Hales
- Unitary authority: Shropshire
- Ceremonial county: Shropshire
- Region: West Midlands
- Country: England
- Sovereign state: United Kingdom
- Post town: MARKET DRAYTON
- Postcode district: TF9
- Dialling code: 01630
- Police: West Mercia
- Fire: Shropshire
- Ambulance: West Midlands
- UK Parliament: North Shropshire

Betton is a hamlet in the civil parish of Norton in Hales, in the Shropshire district, in the county of Shropshire, England.
