= Silverdale railway station (Staffordshire) =

Disused railway station in Staffordshire, England

Silverdale
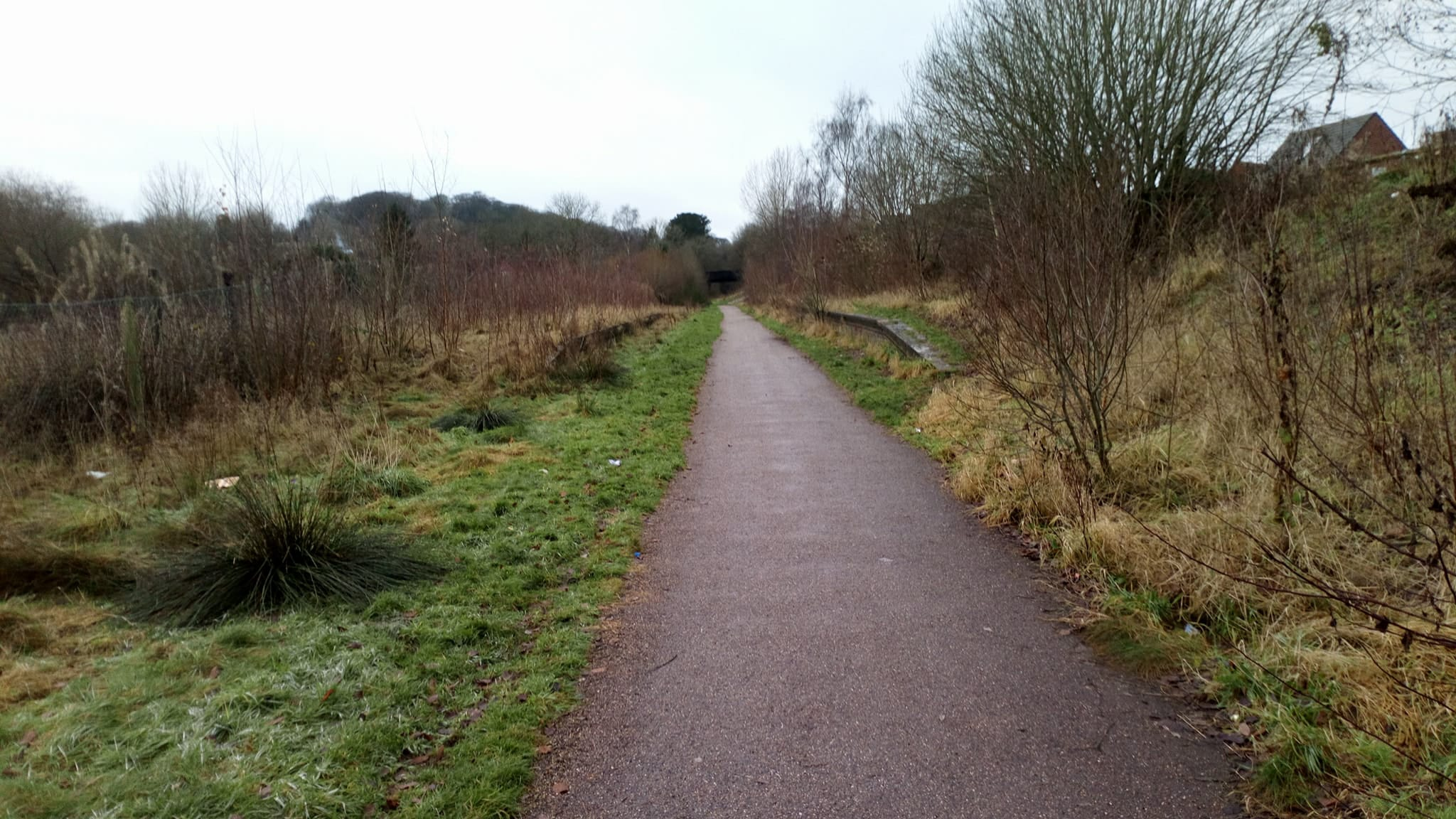
- The site of Silverdale station and the former Silverdale Colliery in December 2017, now the end of the greenway from Newcastle-under-Lyme. The platforms are all that remain in situ.

General information
- Location: Silverdale, Newcastle-under-Lyme, Staffordshire, England
- Coordinates: 53.0172°N 2.2757°W
- Grid reference: SJ816467
- Platforms: 2

Other information
- Status: Disused

History
- Original company: North Staffordshire Railway
- Post-grouping: London, Midland and Scottish Railway; London Midland Region of British Railways

Key dates
- May 1863: Opened
- 2 March 1964: Closed to passengers
- 1998: Closure of Silverdale Colliery and to all stone traffic.
Location

Silverdale railway station was a railway station that served the village of Silverdale, Staffordshire, England. It was opened by the North Staffordshire Railway in 1863 and closed to passengers in 1964.

In its later years, the station was used by staff operating trains to and from the adjacent Silverdale Colliery. For this purpose, a large rail loader was built.

== Present day ==
Today, only the restored platforms are still in place. The station building has been rebuilt at the Apedale Heritage Centre.

On 21 August 2009, work on Silverdale station platforms was observed with brickwork being repaired or repointed and they have now been restored as part of a railway footpath to Newcastle-under-Lyme.

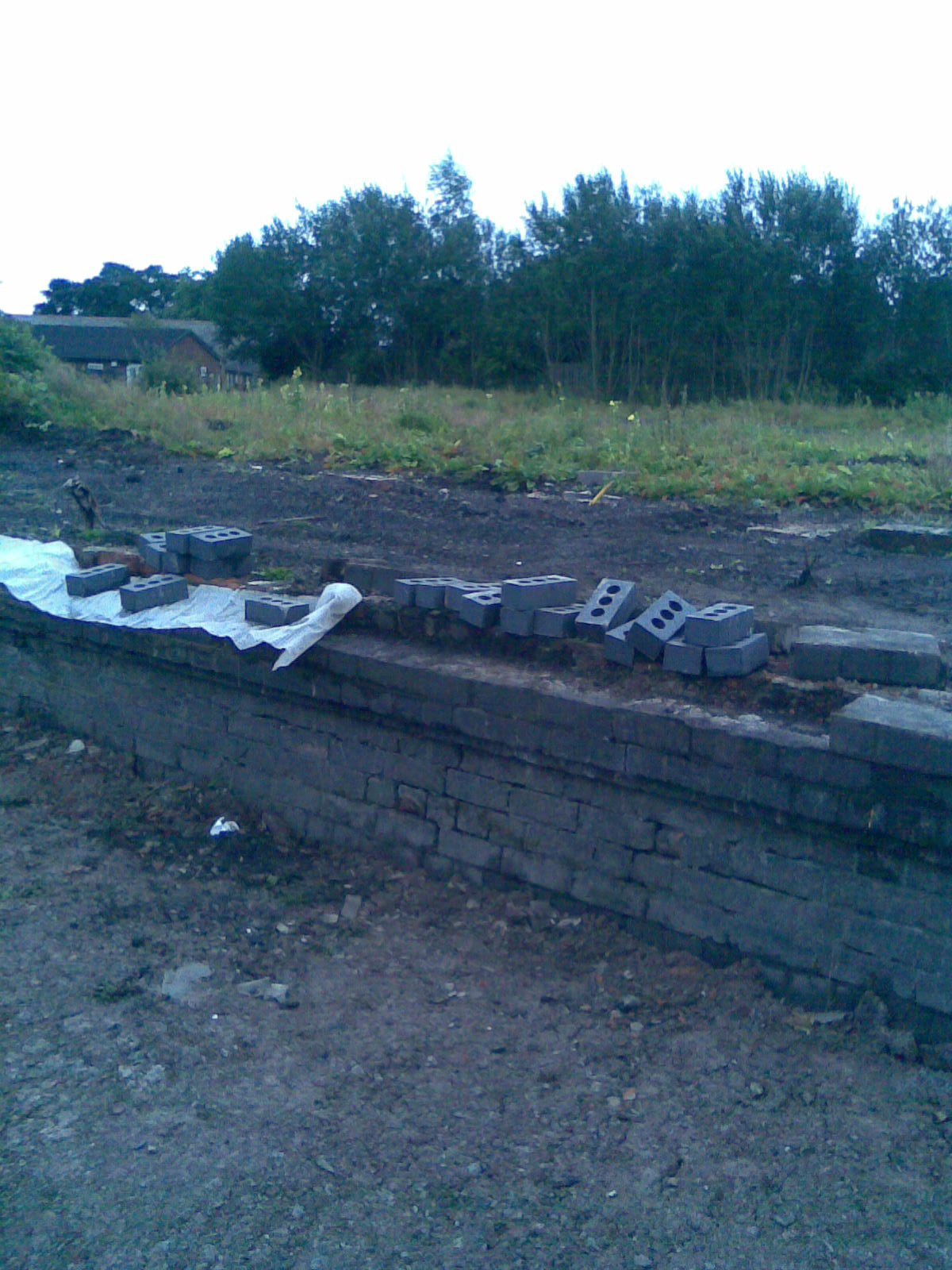
Brickwork under repair on the platform in August 2009

Preceding station	Disused railways	Following station
Keele; Line closed, station closed	North Staffordshire Railway; Stoke-Market Drayton Line	Crown Street Halt; Line closed, station closed
