= Stoke to Market Drayton Line =

Railway line in England

The Stoke to Market Drayton Line was a railway line that ran through Staffordshire and Shropshire that was built by the North Staffordshire Railway.

== Construction ==
Silverdale and Newcastle Railway Act 1859
- Act of Parliament
- Parliament of the United Kingdom
- Long title: An Act to authorize the Maintenance and Use of the Silverdale and Newcastle-under-Lyme Railway, and the Use of the Extension Railway to the Newcastle-under-Lyme Canal, and for other Purposes.
- Citation: 22 & 23 Vict. c. cxiv

Dates
- Royal assent: 13 August 1859

Other legislation
- Amended by: Silverdale and Newcastle Railway Act 1860

Silverdale and Newcastle Railway Act 1860
- Act of Parliament
- Parliament of the United Kingdom
- Long title: An Act to repeal, alter, amend, and extend some of the Powers and Provisions of "The Silverdale and Newcastle Railway Act, 1859;" to authorize the stopping up, altering, and constructing of certain Roads; and for other Purposes.
- Citation: 23 & 24 Vict. c. iii

Dates
- Royal assent: 31 March 1860

Other legislation
- Amends: Silverdale and Newcastle Railway Act 1859

Text of statute as originally enacted

North Staffordshire Railway Branches Act 1864
- Act of Parliament
- Parliament of the United Kingdom
- Long title: An Act to authorize the Construction of Railways from the Silverdale and Newcastle Railway at Wolstanton to the Old Manor House at Madeley, and thence to the Nantwich and Market Drayton and London and North-western Railways; and for other Purposes.
- Citation: 27 & 28 Vict. c. cccix

Dates
- Royal assent: 29 July 1864

Text of statute as originally enacted

The first part of the line to be built required the private Silverdale and Newcastle Railway, built in 1850 by ironmaster Ralph Sneyd, to become public. This was enabled by the Silverdale and Newcastle Railway Act 1859 (22 & 23 Vict. c. cxiv) and passenger services from Stoke to Newcastle began in 1862. Silverdale was reached in May 1863.

Meanwhile, the Great Western Railway was planning to reach Manchester and in an effort to block this, the Market Drayton extension was completed in February 1870.

== Services ==
The early years of the 20th century were the busiest, there being thirteen trains daily from Stoke to Silverdale and five to Market Drayton.

Railmotor services began in 1905 and several new halts were built. Running from Silverdale as far as Trentham, they were intended to compete with trams and were somewhat successful in this respect, although they only lasted until 1926.

The section between Silverdale and Pipe Gate was reduced to single track in October 1934.

Dwindling passenger numbers after World War II meant that there were only two trains daily from Stoke to Market Drayton, and services ceased on 7 May 1956 when they were cut back to Silverdale. Passenger services to the latter ceased in 1964, a casualty of the Beeching Axe.

== Freight traffic ==
Express Dairies had a creamery with private siding access to Pipe Gate, allowing its preferred transport partner the GWR to provide milk trains to the facility, for onward scheduling to London.

Following nationalisation there was a very considerable increase in freight traffic on this route reaching a peak of 10,000 tons weekly in 1962–63.

In 1962 a new "chord" line was opened at Madeley to provide a connection to the West Coast Main Line. This was used as a diversionary route when the Harecastle diversion line was being constructed and continued in use for freight workings once the latter was completed.

After closure of the creamery at Pipe Gate, the route between Market Drayton and Madeley Chord closed for good in 1966. That same year, the line between Newcastle Junction (Stoke) and Brampton Sidings was closed and the junction severed in preparation for the West Coast Main Line electrification. The Pool Dam branch survived until 7 October 1967.

== Final years ==
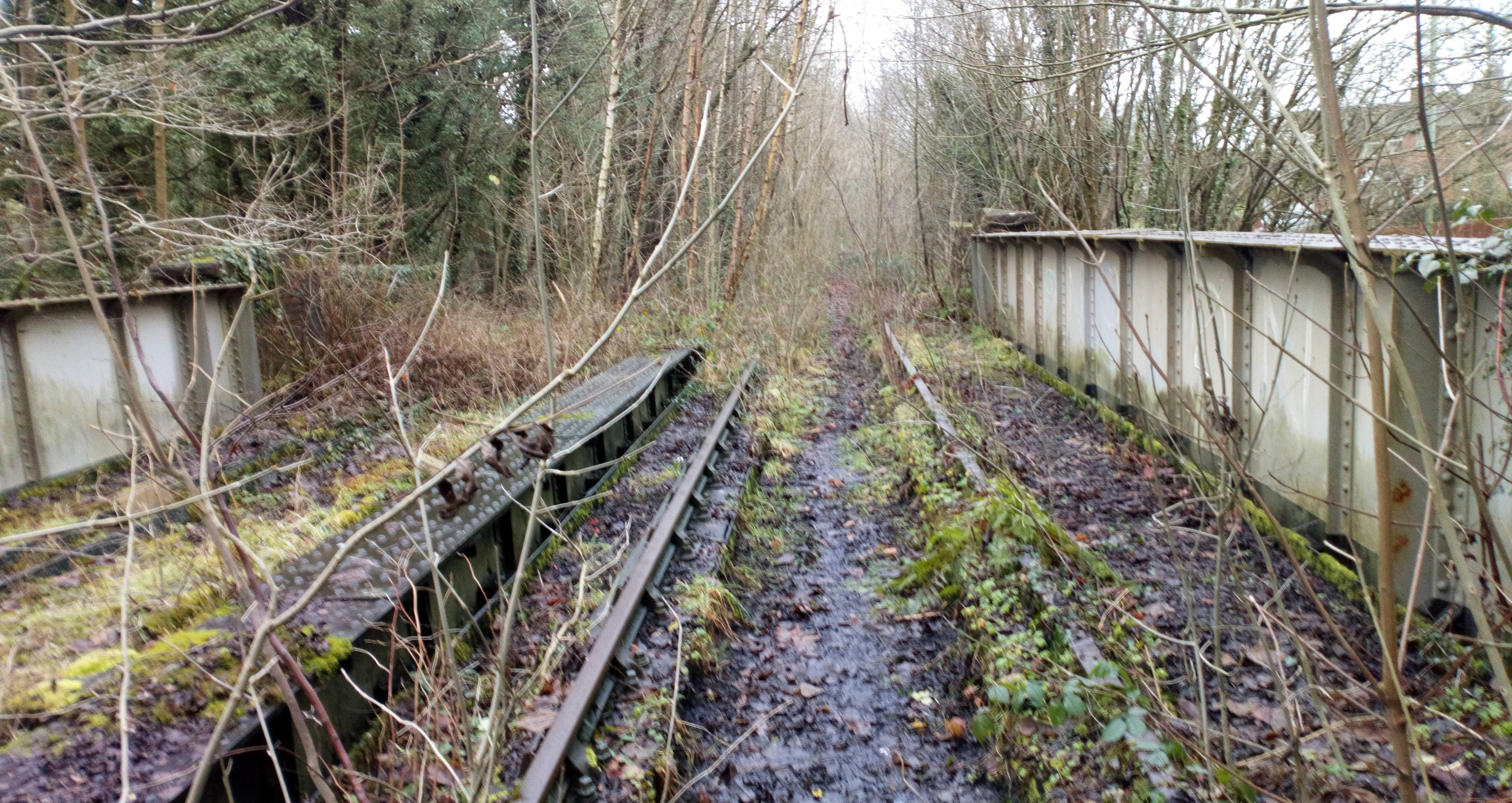
Old bridge with tracks in situ but out of use

The last traffic on the line was coal from Apedale and Silverdale collieries, which ceased in December 1998 when the latter was closed.

== Present day ==
As of 2020, the line remains extant but out of use between Newcastle and just west of Madeley Road station. The line is also extant from Silverdale Tunnel, and now a public footpath runs along the line, from its start in Stoke-on-Trent (Cockshot Lock/Newcastle Junction) to as far as Silverdale station.

The station at Norton-in-Hales is the only station still standing on the former route, as a private residence. The station site at Newcastle-Under-Lyme has been landscaped, and Market Drayton's has been demolished and built on by both a Morrisons store and an industrial complex.

In 2009 the platforms at Silverdale were cleared of vegetation and the derelict track from the former station site to the tunnel portal was lifted but the track remains intact between Silverdale and Pipe Gate via Keele and Madeley Road.

In January 2019, Campaign for Better Transport released a report identifying the line between Stoke and Wellington which was listed as Priority 2 for reopening. Priority 2 is for those lines which require further development or a change in circumstances (such as housing developments).

== Stations ==
Station Name	Co-ordinates
Stoke-on-Trent	53.008031°N 2.181001°W
Hartshill and Basford Halt	53.013208°N 2.20469°W
Newcastle-under-Lyme	53.013921°N 2.22096°W
Brampton Halt	53.01567°N 2.226411°W
Liverpool Road Halt	53.01712°N 2.229742°W
Pool Dam	53.017907°N 2.237585°W
Knutton Halt	53.016713°N 2.245213°W
Crown Street Halt	53.017092°N 2.265276°W
Silverdale	53.017059°N 2.276187°W
Keele	53.010172°N 2.301856°W
Keele Park	52.991540°N 2.310348°W
Madeley Road	52.977327°N 2.333881°W
Pipe Gate	52.964053°N 2.394172°W
Norton-in-Hales	52.947345°N 2.448353°W
Market Drayton	52.909135°N 2.489133°W
