= Silverdale, Staffordshire =

Village in England

Coordinates: 53.0159°N 2.2675°W

Silverdale
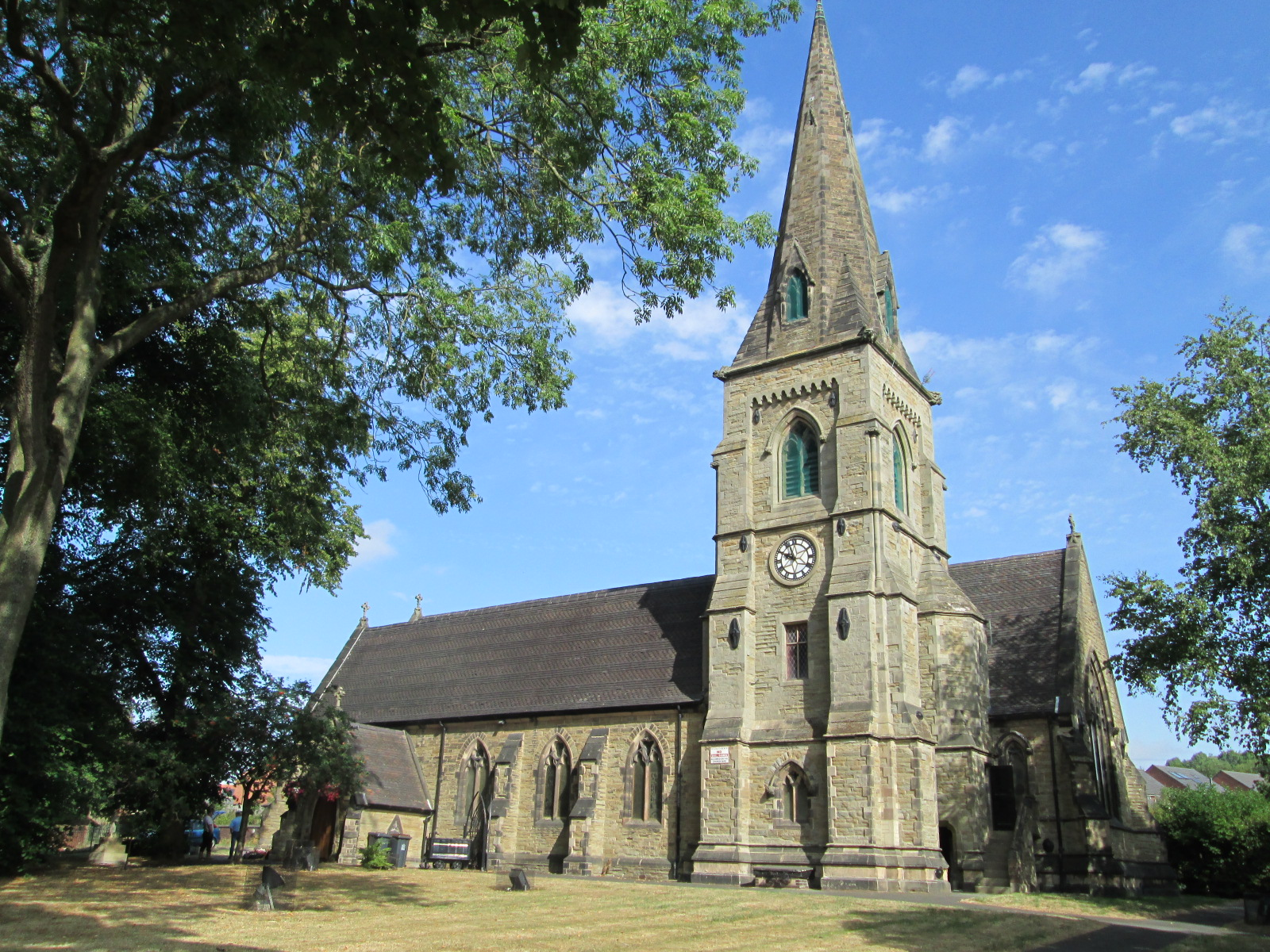
- St Luke's Church

- Location within Staffordshire
- Population: 4,957 (2011)
- OS grid reference: SJ821465
- District: Newcastle-under-Lyme
- Shire county: Staffordshire
- Region: West Midlands
- Country: England
- Sovereign state: United Kingdom
- Post town: NEWCASTLE
- Postcode district: ST5
- Dialling code: 01782
- Police: Staffordshire
- Fire: Staffordshire
- Ambulance: West Midlands
- UK Parliament: Newcastle-under-Lyme

Silverdale is a village and civil parish in the Borough of Newcastle-under-Lyme in Staffordshire, west of Newcastle-under-Lyme. It is a self contained ward of Newcastle Borough Council returning two Councillors. Historically, the village was dominated by the coal industry and records indicate coal was mined in the area as long ago as the 13th century. The last colliery, Silverdale Colliery, closed in 1998. Brick-maker Ibstock also operate a large clay quarry next to the former colliery.

== Silverdale Colliery ==
The main employer in Silverdale for well over 100 years was Silverdale Colliery, also known locally as Kent's Lane. The first shafts were sunk in the 1830s and the colliery initially mined ironstone as well as coal. The main user of both the minerals was the nearby Silverdale Forge.

The colliery was completely rebuilt during the 1970s when three new drifts were sunk to exploit new reserves in the Keele area. Production increased and the pit mined over one million tonnes annually but was closed in 1998, the last deep mine in North Staffordshire to close.

One of the coal spoil heaps from the Silverdale mine on Hollywood road between Silverdale and Keele caught fire in 1996, two years before the site's closure, and continues to burn two decades later. While the fire is primarily underground there have been times when the heat and smoke have made it to the surface setting fire to parts of Holly Wood for which the road is named. Speculation has been raised that attempts to fight the fire or open it up for housing work could result in what is left of the Silverdale coal seam catching fire as well.

== Walleys Quarry ==
Silverdale and surrounding communities have been fighting for action on Walleys Quarry landfill, located at the village's entrance. Walleys, ran by controversial operator Red Industries, has repeatedly broken UN hydrogen sulphide emission levels. Local health workers have well-evidenced residents' widespread physical and psychological distress. The 'terrifying' stink, similar to rotting eggs, can be smelled for miles around. The affected communities have challenged the UK Environment Agency and authorities' inaction legally, protested and blocked the site's entrance. This struggle for environmental justice, in a community scarred by extractivism, continues.

In November 2024, after the local council had exhausted other enforcement options, the Environment Agency ordered the site's closure for accepting new waste. In February 2025, the owner of the site, Walleys Quarry Ltd (now renamed from Red Industries) went into liquidation and simultaneously disclaimed their environmental permits, meaning the landfill was transferred to the Crown Estate responsibility via Escheat. As the Crown Estate does not take any actions that could be construed as management, ownership or possession, the Environment Agency is currently using its discretionary powers to reduce the risk of serious pollution.

== Country park ==
The Silverdale Country Park, to the west of the village, was created on the former Silverdale Colliery. It was part of a restoration project funded by the Homes and Communities Agency, using money from their National Coalfields Programme. Its area is 83 hectares (210 acres), and it is a park of the Land Trust.

There are two areas. The Waste Farm Plateau, created from colliery spoil, is open grassland on several distinct levels, with extensive views from the highest point. The second areas, the Void, is a steeply sloping bowl, at the base of which is the Southern Pool, where wildfowl can be seen. The Void area was designated a Site of Biological Importance in 2015.

== Notable residents ==
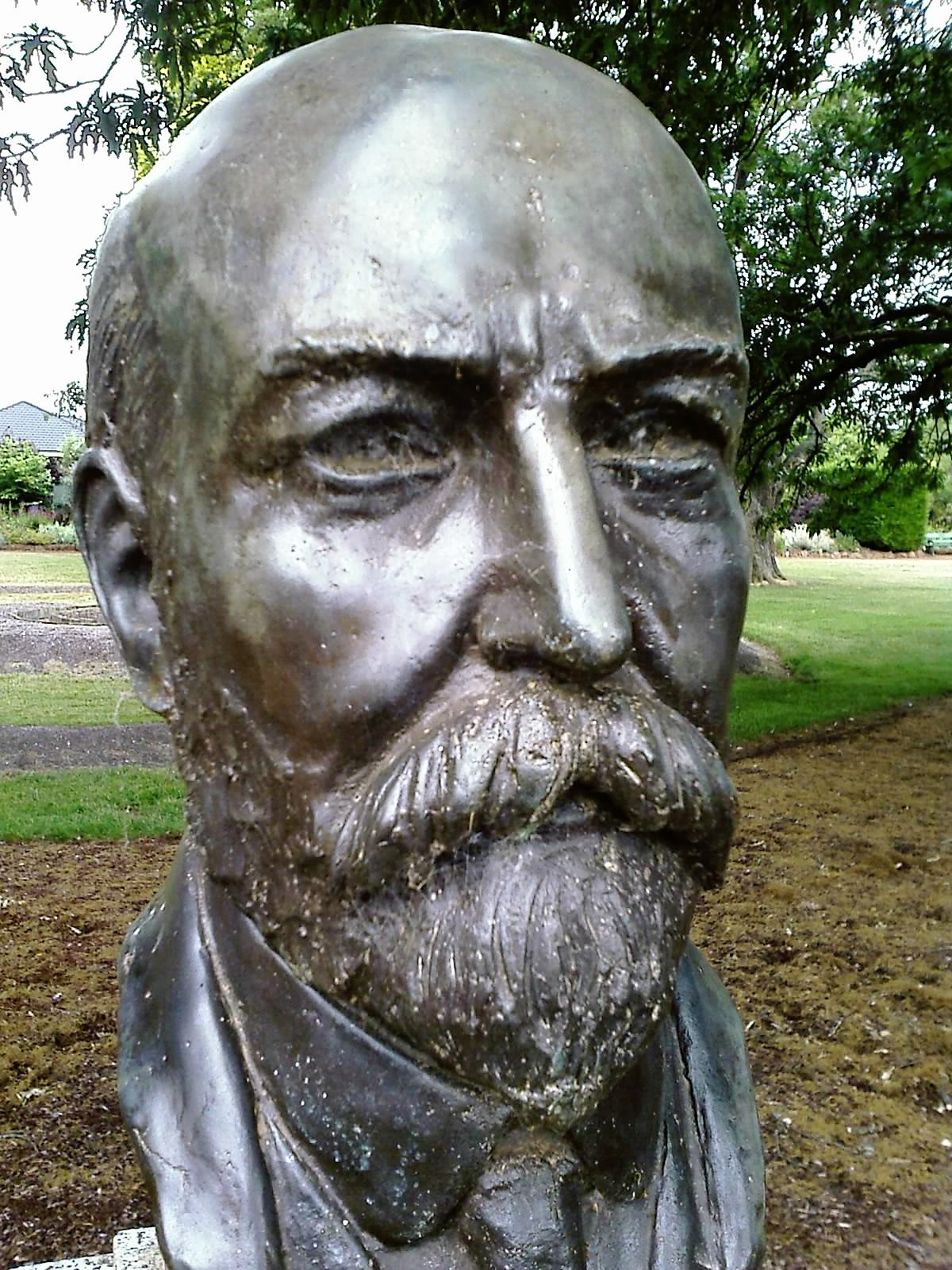
Bust of Joseph Cook by sculptor Wallace Anderson

- Henry Radcliffe Crocker MD, FRCP (1846–1909) an English dermatologist. Aged 16 he went as apprentice and assistant to a doctor at Silverdale.
- Sir Joseph Cook GCMG (1860–1947), Australian politician and sixth Prime Minister of Australia, was born in the village as Joseph Cooke.
- John Cadman, 1st Baron Cadman (1877–1941), mining engineer, petroleum technologist and public servant.
- Fanny Deakin (1883 in Silverdale – 1968) campaigned for better nourishment of young children and maternity care for working class mothers, labour rights and welfare as a socialist politician.
- Keith Broomhall (born 1951 in Silverdale) an English former footballer who played two games for Port Vale F.C.

== Transport ==
Silverdale was served by a railway station which was opened by the North Staffordshire Railway in May 1863. The station was on the NSR Newcastle to Market Drayton line and was closed in the 1960s. The station buildings remained for a number of years as train crew accommodation for British Rail staff who worked the coal trains to Silverdale Colliery. The rapid loader was located adjacent to the old station.

In 2009, the track was removed between the station and Silverdale tunnel, but the two short station platforms still exist. The line from the entrance to the former site at Pepper Street, through the old station and onto Knutton and Newcastle-under-Lyme, has been regenerated into a public access foot and cycle path, providing a single, safe, accessible footpath for Newcastle-under-Lyme College for much of its prime catchment area.

Buses are run by D&G Bus to Newcastle-under-Lyme, Audley and Keele.

== Listed buildings ==
As of 2026 the only listed building in the parish is the grade II listed St Luke's Church.
