= Cobridge railway station =

Former railway station in Staffordshire, England

Cobridge
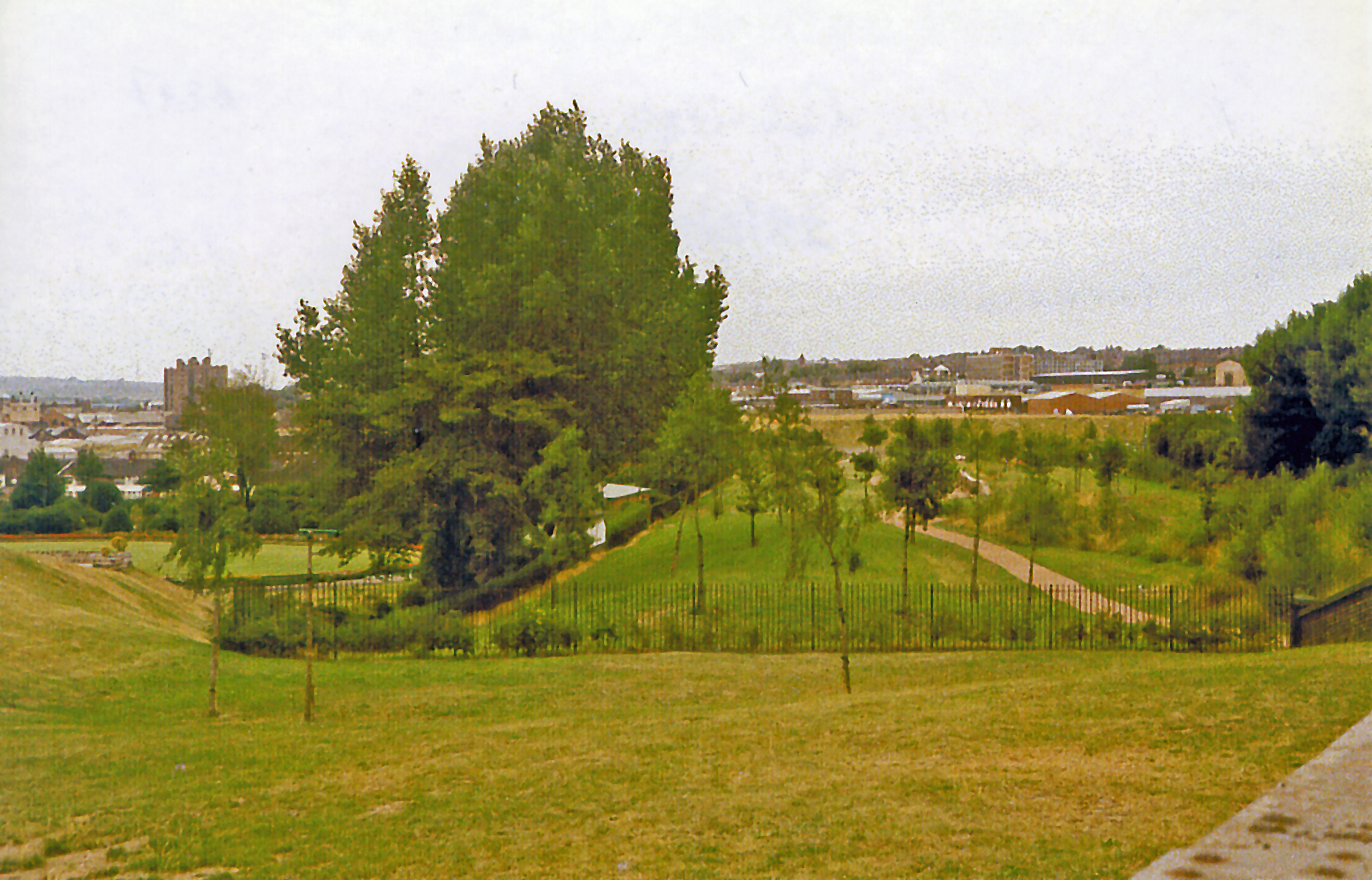
- Site of the station in 1983

General information
- Location: Cobridge, Stoke-on-Trent, England
- Coordinates: 53.0386°N 2.1850°W
- Grid reference: SJ876490
- Platforms: 2

Other information
- Status: Disused

History
- Original company: North Staffordshire Railway
- Post-grouping: London, Midland and Scottish Railway, London Midland Region of British Railways

Key dates
- 1 October 1874: Opened
- 2 March 1964: Closed
Location

Cobridge railway station served the Cobridge area of Stoke-on-Trent, in Staffordshire, England, between 1874 and 1964. It was a stop on the Potteries Loop Line, which connected Stoke-on-Trent with Mow Cop and Scholar Green.

== History ==
The North Staffordshire Railway (NSR) opened the station in 1874, along with the second section of the Potteries Loop Line. It was located between Elder Road and Sandbach Road.

By the time of grouping in 1923, the NSR merged into the London, Midland and Scottish Railway (LMS), which lasted until 1948.

In 1948, the station and the line moved under the London Midland Region of British Railways. Diesel multiple units were introduced on to the line at the end of the 1950s, as part of a modernisation programme.

Cobridge station was recommended listed for closure in the Beeching Report of 1963. It was closed in 1964, when the passenger service on the Loop was withdrawn.

Preceding station	Disused railways	Following station
Burslem Line and station closed	North Staffordshire Railway Potteries Loop Line	Waterloo Road Line and station closed

== The site today ==
As of 2025, the bridge and steps that led to the platform are extant. The trackbed is now a footpath and the tunnel, which was to the south of the station, was infilled in 1969.

== In popular culture ==
Local Stoke-on-Trent author Arnold Bennett, himself from Cobridge, would remember the station and mention it in his books; examples included "Anna of the Five Towns" (1902) and "The Old Wives' Tale" (1908).
