= Pitts Hill =

Village in Staffordshire, England

Coordinates: 53.0683°N 2.2003°W

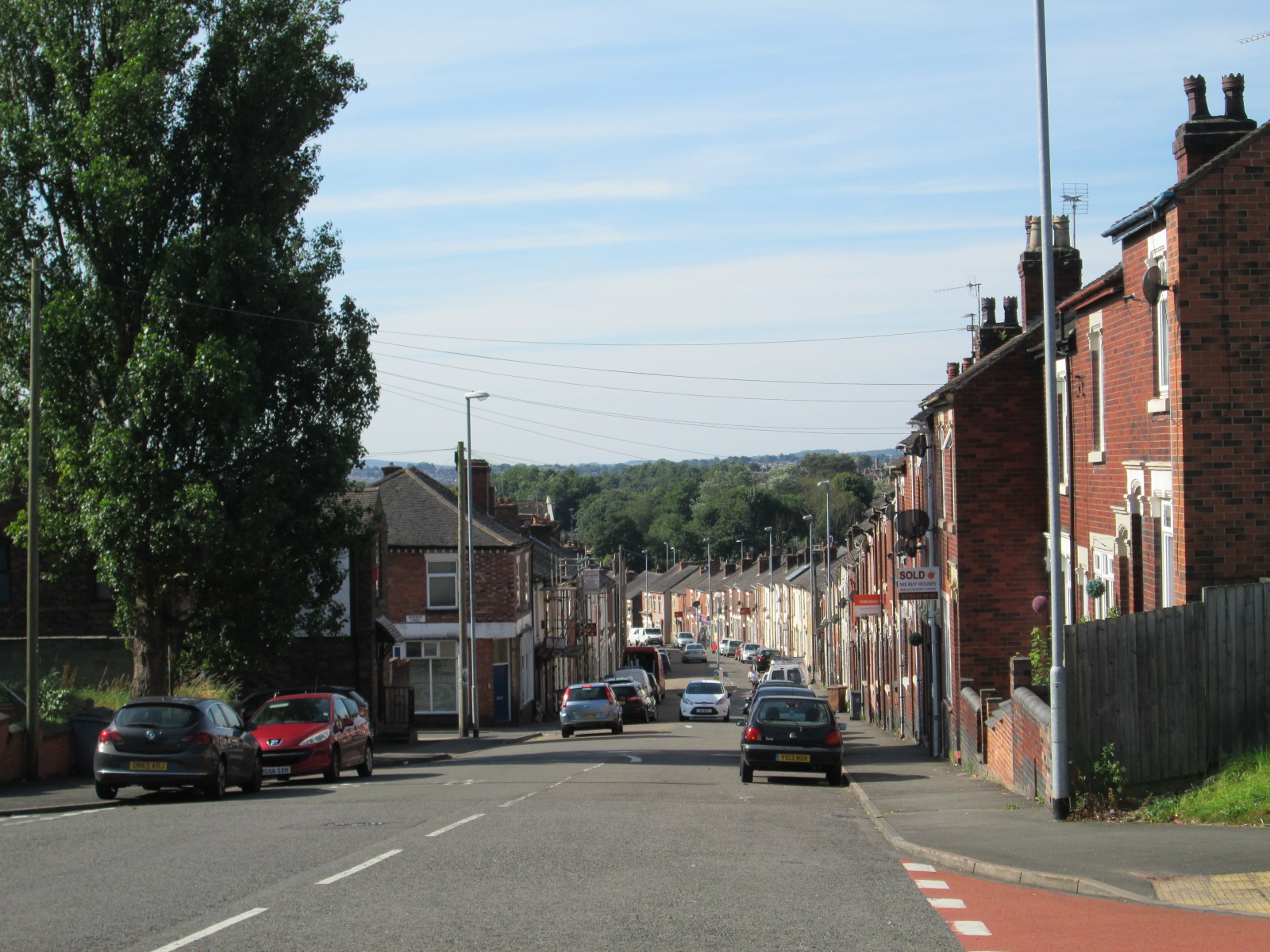
- Looking south-west along St Michael's Road, Pitts Hill

- Location within Staffordshire
- OS grid reference: SJ 867 523
- District: Stoke-on-Trent
- Shire county: Staffordshire
- Region: West Midlands
- Country: England
- Sovereign state: United Kingdom
- Post town: Stoke-on-Trent
- Postcode district: ST7
- Dialling code: 01782
- Police: Staffordshire
- Fire: Staffordshire
- Ambulance: West Midlands
- UK Parliament: Stoke-on-Trent

Pitts Hill, or Pittshill, is a small village in Stoke-on-Trent, between Tunstall to the south-west and Great Chell to the north-east.

== History and description ==
It is centred around St Michael's Road, leading to Great Chell, where the parish church is St Michael and All Angels, built in 1894. The parish, including Pitts Hill, Chell, Turnhurst and Fegg Hayes, was created in 1925.

The railway station at Pitts Hill, part of the Potteries Loop Line, opened a year after the opening of Tunstall railway station in 1873. The loop line closed in 1964. A pool has been created at the site of the former station.

It is recorded that in 1683 the manor court ordered the filling in of pits made at Pitts Hill Bank; the pits were made by potters of the day digging for clay.

There was coal mining in the area from medieval times. In the 1870s there was a colliery east of the main road at Pitts Hill.

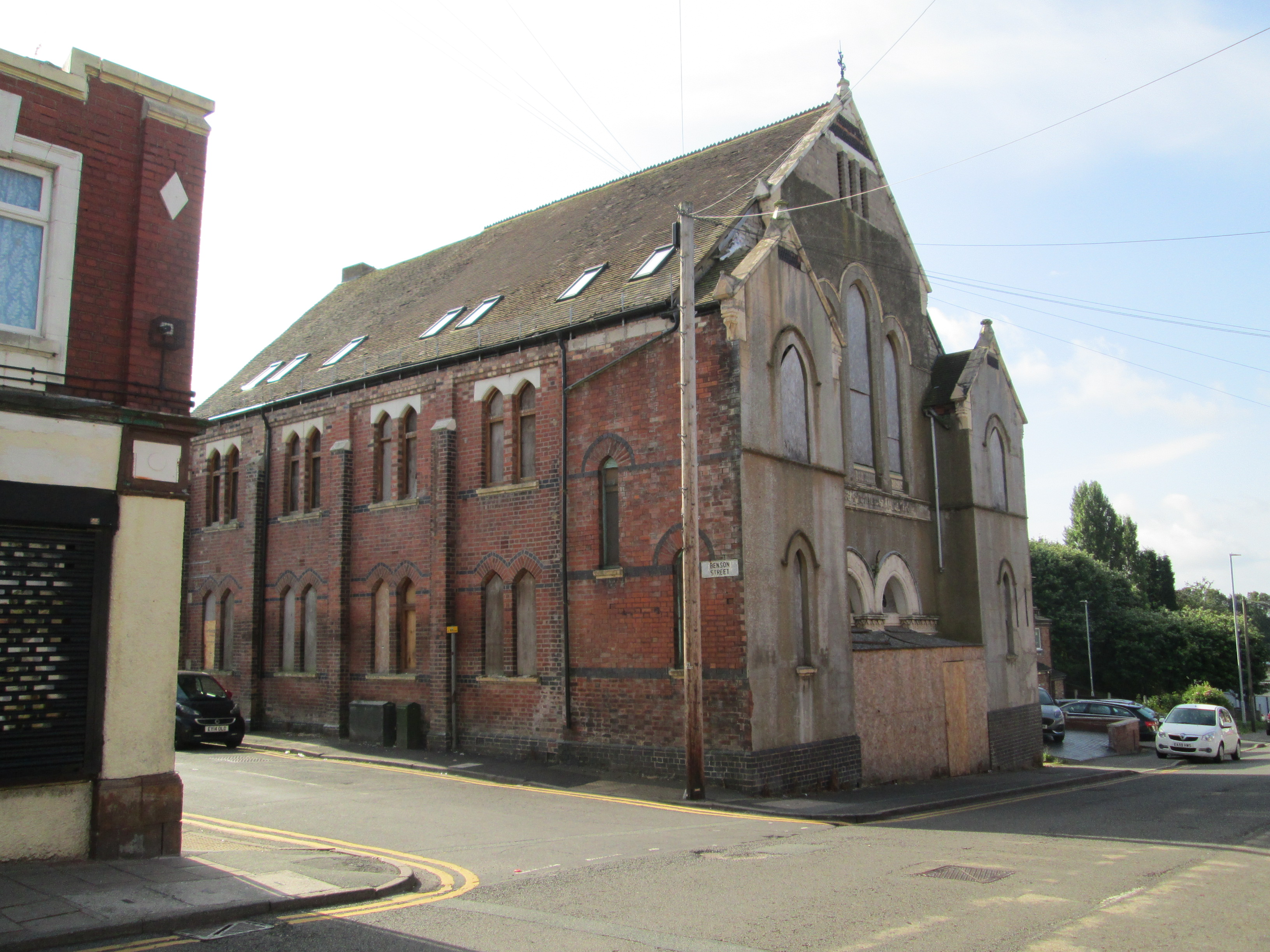
Pitts Hill Primitive Methodist Chapel

The Primitive Methodist movement began around 1800 in the moorland areas north and east of Tunstall, and there was a preaching place in Pitts Hill in 1811. A chapel built in 1823 was later enlarged; in 1851 it seated 340. It was replaced in 1876 by the present building, on the corner of St Michael's Road and Benson Street. It has been closed for several years.

The Vine pub, in Naylor Street, was Grade II listed in 2002; it is described in the listing as a "now rare example of a small, back street public house serving a working community". It was built about 1875. In 2025, it was the national winner of the Heritage Award given by the Campaign for Real Ale.
