= Burslem railway station =

Former railway station in Staffordshire, England

Burslem
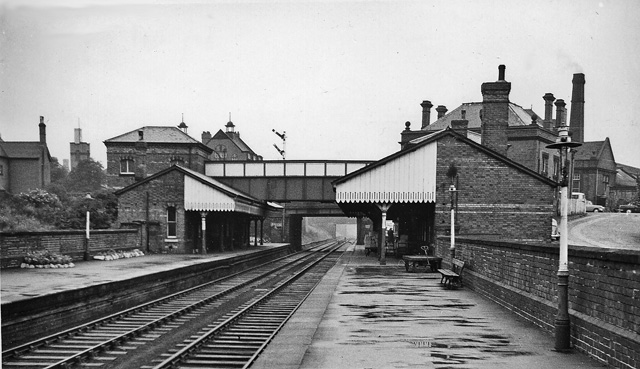
- The station in 1962

General information
- Location: Burslem, Stoke-on-Trent, England
- Coordinates: 53.0467°N 2.1926°W
- Grid reference: SJ872499
- Platforms: 2

Other information
- Status: Disused

History
- Original company: North Staffordshire Railway
- Post-grouping: London, Midland and Scottish Railway, London Midland Region of British Railways

Key dates
- 1 December 1873: Opened
- 9 October 1961: Closed to goods
- 2 March 1964: Closed to passengers
Location

Burslem railway station served the town of Burslem, in Staffordshire, England, between 1873 and 1964. It was a stop on the Potteries Loop Line and was located on Moorland Road, adjacent to Burslem Park.

== History ==
The station should have opened along with the extension of the Potteries Loop Line from Hanley on 1 November 1873, but the Board of Trade inspector was not satisfied so there was a delay of a month before opening. The line ran between Staffordshire and Cheshire; it connected Stoke-on-Trent with Mow Cop and Scholar Green, via Hanley, Tunstall and Kidsgrove.

It was recommended for closure in the 1963 Beeching Report from British Railways; it was closed along with the Potteries Loop Line in 1964.

Preceding station	Disused railways	Following station
Tunstall Line and station closed	North Staffordshire Railway Potteries Loop Line	Cobridge Line and station closed

== The site today ==
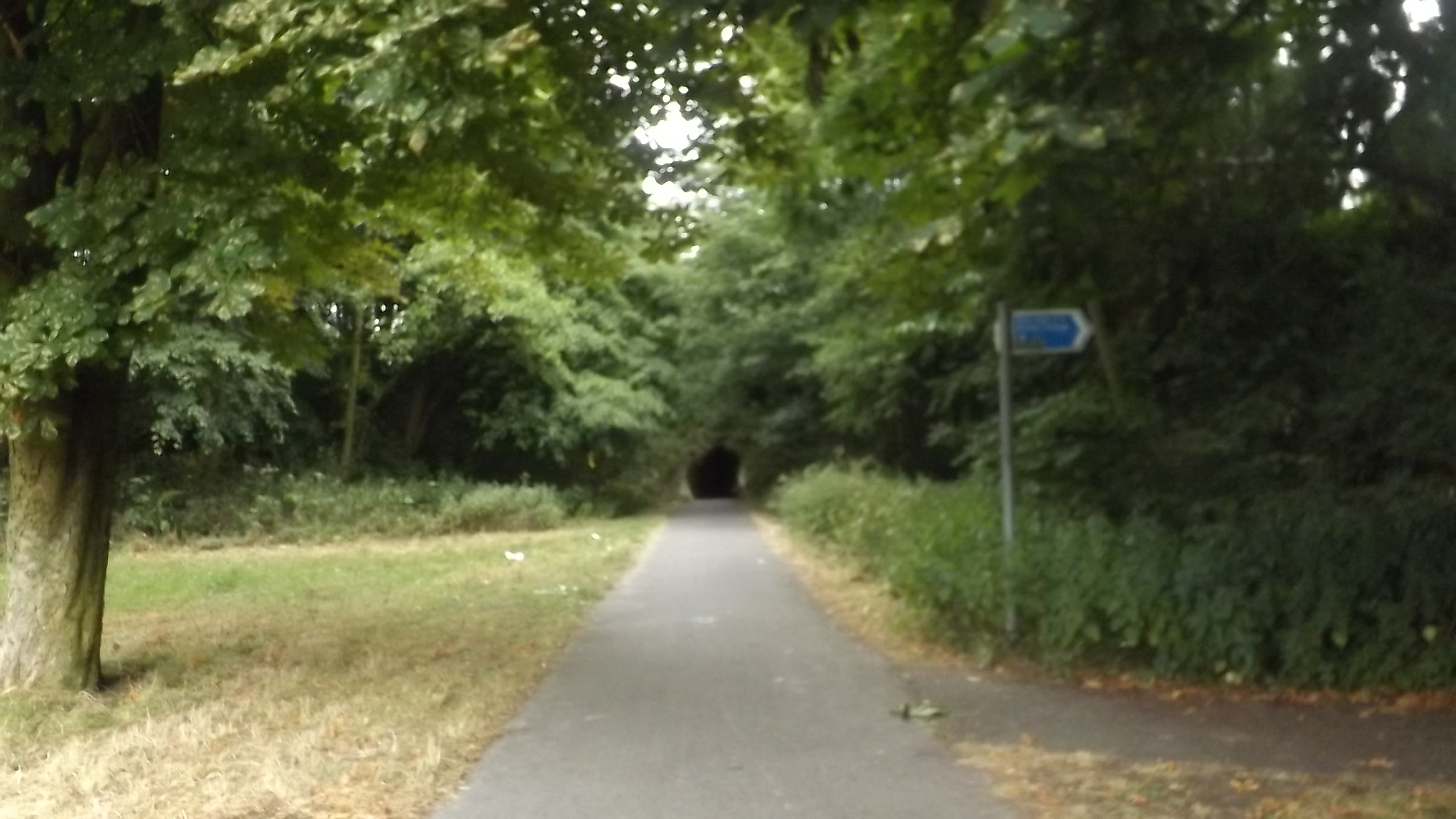
The station site in 2018

Most traces of the station have been removed although the old station master's house, known as Station House, is still occupied on a site between the old line and Burslem Park on Moorland Road.

The site of the station and sidings now forms part of a Greenway for walkers and cyclists, running along part of the route of the old Loop Line which has been landscaped.

== In popular culture ==
Writer Arnold Bennett, who lived locally and was buried in Burslem Cemetery in 1931, remembers Burslem station in his writing. Examples include "Anna of the Five Towns" (1902) and "The Old Wives' Tale" (1908), in which the five towns' names corresponded closely with their originals; Burslem became Bursley.
