= Goldenhill =

Area of Stoke-on-Trent, England

Coordinates: 53.075°N 2.219°W

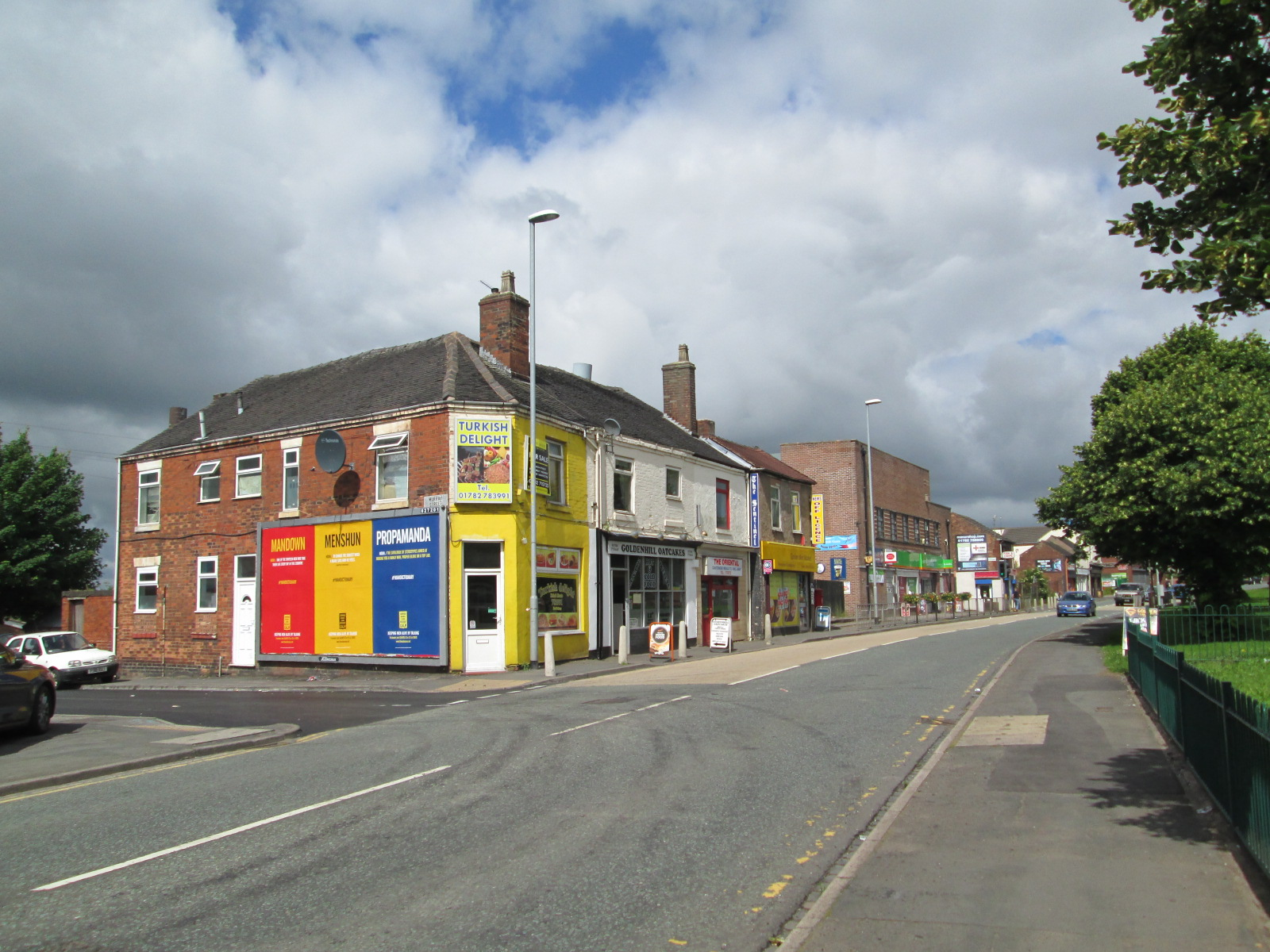
- High Street, Goldenhill

- Location within Staffordshire
- OS grid reference: SJ854531
- Unitary authority: Stoke-on-Trent
- Ceremonial county: Staffordshire
- Region: West Midlands
- Country: England
- Sovereign state: United Kingdom
- Post town: STOKE-ON-TRENT
- Postcode district: ST6
- Dialling code: 01782
- Police: Staffordshire
- Fire: Staffordshire
- Ambulance: West Midlands

Goldenhill is an area on the northern edge of Stoke-on-Trent, in the Stoke-on-Trent district, in the ceremonial county of Staffordshire, England. It is centred along the High Street, part of the A50 road that runs from south-east to north-west. It is about 1 mile (1.6 km) north of Tunstall and 1.5 miles (2.4 km) south-east of Kidsgrove.

Its altitude is 700 feet (210 m), the highest point in Stoke-on-Trent.

== History ==
Goldenhill is not mentioned in the Domesday Book. The village existed by 1670, and is shown in Robert Plot's map of Staffordshire dated 1682. In 1775 it was nearly as large as Tunstall, and grew further during the 19th century.

It is thought there was pottery manufacture of coarse ware in Goldenhill during the 16th century. At the beginning of the 19th century there were six potteries works. During the century pottery manufacture became more concentrated in Tunstall, which had 13 potteries by 1834, compared with two in Goldenhill; in 1863 there were 19 potteries in Tunstall and one in Goldenhill, which closed soon afterwards.

There was coal mining on a small scale in the 1700s. James Brindley, builder of the Harecastle Tunnel in the 1770s, built a branch canal from the tunnel to an underground wharf of a colliery in Goldenhill in which he had a share; by 1820 this had become unsafe and was closed. The Goldenhill Colliery, in Colclough Lane, excavating coal and ironstone, was owned by Robert Williamson in the mid 19th century. It was still operating in the 1920s, but was closed by 1931.

The Potteries Waterworks Company, formed in 1847, supplied water to Goldenhill and Kidsgrove by pumping water from a steam pumping plant in Tunstall, built in 1854, to a new reservoir on the higher ground at Goldenhill.

The Potteries Loop Line, built in 1873, was extended to Goldenhill in 1874 and Goldenhill railway station was opened. The Loop Line, including Goldenhill station, was closed to passengers in 1964.

Goldenhill was formerly a chapelry in the parish of Wolstanton, from 1894 Goldenhill was a civil parish in its own right, on 1 April 1922 the parish was abolished and merged with Stoke on Trent. In 1921 the parish had a population of 5046.

== Churches ==
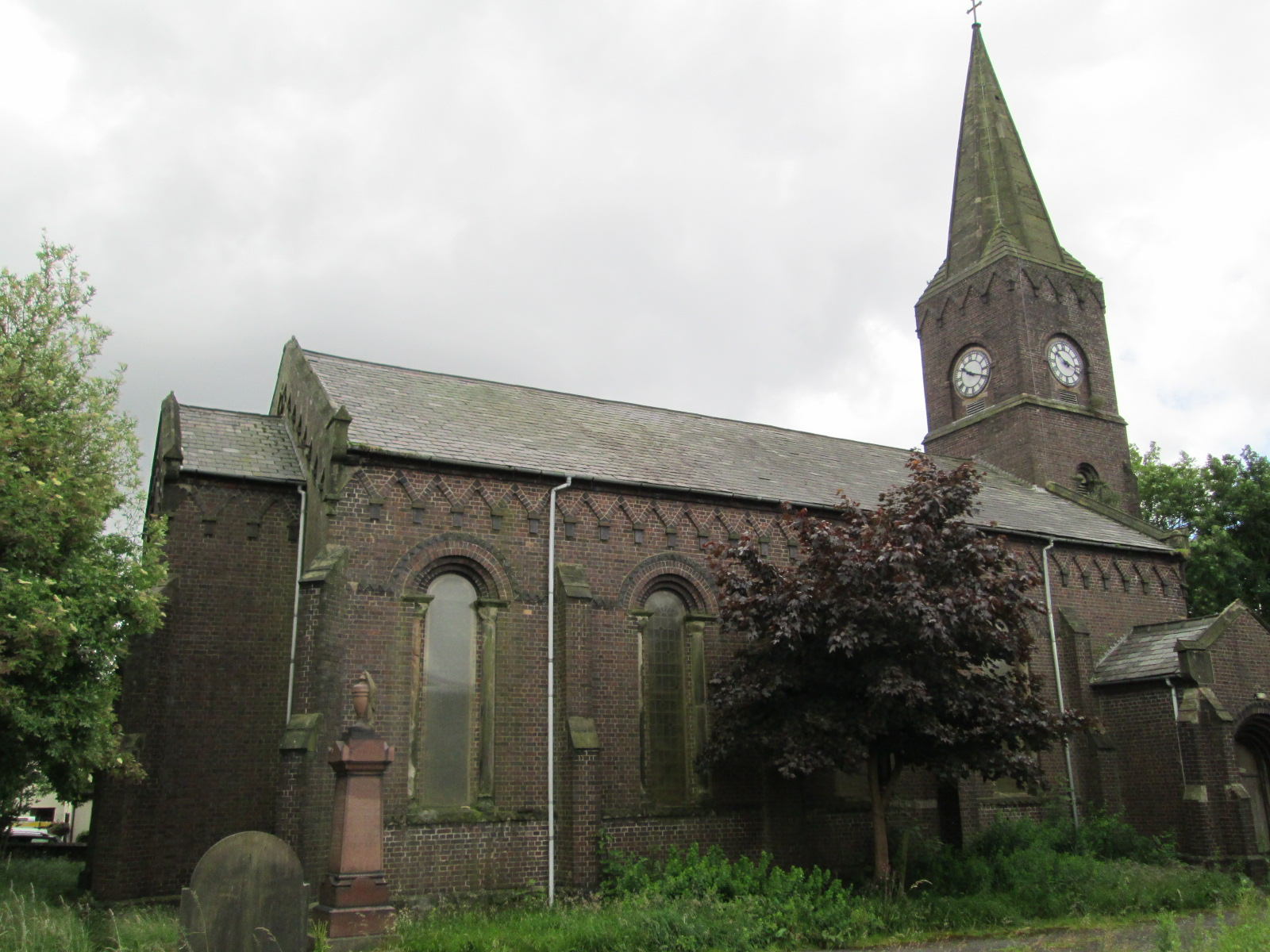
Church of St John the Evangelist, Goldenhill, in 2016

The Anglican Church of St John the Evangelist, on High Street, was built in 1841 in Romanesque style. It is a Grade II listed building. In poor condition and with a small congregation, it closed in 2014. In April 2016, after a local consultation, it was decided that the War Memorial in the grounds of the church would be relocated to Goldenhill Methodist Church.

The Roman Catholic Church of St Joseph, built in 1951–1953, is on High Street.

The present-day Methodist Church is on High Street. There was originally a Wesleyan Methodist Chapel built on High Street in 1822; it was replaced in 1868. A Primitive Methodist chapel was built at Goldenhill in 1833. From 1892 to 1900 there was a Methodist New Connexion chapel.
