= Pitts Hill railway station =

Disused railway station in Staffordshire, England

Pitts Hill

General information
- Location: Pitts Hill, Staffordshire, Stoke-on-Trent; England
- Coordinates: 53.0665°N 2.2027°W
- Grid reference: SJ865520
- Platforms: 2

Other information
- Status: Disused

History
- Original company: North Staffordshire Railway
- Post-grouping: London, Midland and Scottish Railway; London Midland Region of British Railways

Key dates
- 1 October 1874: Opened
- 2 March 1964: Closed
Location

Pitts Hill railway station served the Pitts Hill area of Stoke-on-Trent, Staffordshire, England.

The station what was listed for closure under the Beeching Report in 1963 closed in 1964 and 1966 to passengers and goods. Since 2005 there has been a monument put down to show where Pitts Hill Railway Station was but the site has been drastically altered since by the closure and rerouting of the A527 road, although the route of the Potteries Loop Line can still be traced.

Preceding station	Disused railways	Following station
Newchapel and Goldenhill Line and station closed	North Staffordshire Railway Potteries Loop Line	Tunstall Line and station closed
