= Pinnox branch =

Coordinates: 53.053745°N 2.202179°W

The Pinnox railway branch officially called the Spur line ran from Pinnox Junction to Tunstall Junction which was located just south of Tunstall railway station. The line was the lower of the two branch lines at Tunstall.

The Pinnox branch was connected to a nearby Colliery via the use of a private mineral line.

The Pinnox branch was originally constructed as a mineral line between Longport and Tunstall. The line after leaving the main line at Longport Junction ran past Westport Lake on an embankment before passing under Davenport Road and Westport Road. The branch passed the side of what is now Co-operative Academy at Brownhill. The junction with the Potteries Loop Line was at Pinnox Junction, Tunstall.

== Present ==
The line was lifted in the later 1960s after the line was used for the construction of the new Harecastle Tunnel. The line was used as the diversion route from the mainline at Longport to the loop line and back on the mainline north of Kidsgrove.

The only bit left is a short stub north of Longport station.
