= Kidsgrove Liverpool Road railway station =

Former railway station in Staffordshire, England

Kidsgrove Liverpool Road
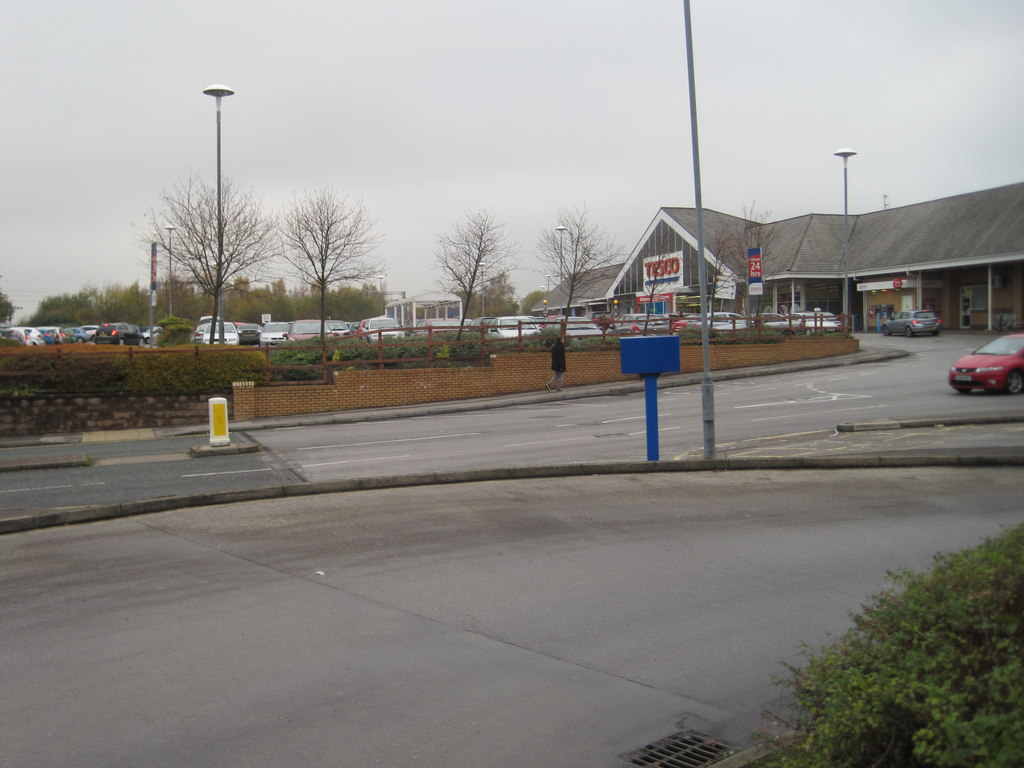
- Supermarket on the site of the former station (2014)

General information
- Location: Kidsgrove, Borough of Newcastle-under-Lyme, England
- Coordinates: 53.0891°N 2.2450°W
- Grid reference: SJ836546
- Line: Potteries Loop Line
- Platforms: 2

Other information
- Status: Disused

History
- Original company: North Staffordshire Railway
- Post-grouping: London, Midland and Scottish Railway; London Midland Region of British Railways

Key dates
- 15 November 1875: Opened as Kidsgrove
- 2 October 1944: Renamed Kidsgrove Liverpool Road
- 2 March 1964: Closed
Location

Kidsgrove Liverpool Road was the northernmost station on the Potteries Loop Line and served the town of Kidsgrove, in Staffordshire, England.

== History ==
The station was opened as Kidsgrove in 1875, but was renamed in 1944 when the nearby Harecastle station became Kidsgrove Central.

In the Beeching Report of 1963, the station was recommended for closure. It was subsequently closed to passengers in 1964, but the Potteries Loop Line remained in use until the electrification of the West Coast Main Line, on which Kidsgrove Central station (now Kidsgrove) is a stop. The signal box was closed in 1975.

Preceding station	Disused railways	Following station
Mow Cop and Scholar Green Line and station closed	North Staffordshire Railway Potteries Loop Line	Market Street Halt Line and station closed

== The site today ==
The site is now occupied by a Tesco supermarket.
