= Waterloo Road (NSR) railway station =

Former railway station in Staffordshire, England

Waterloo Road
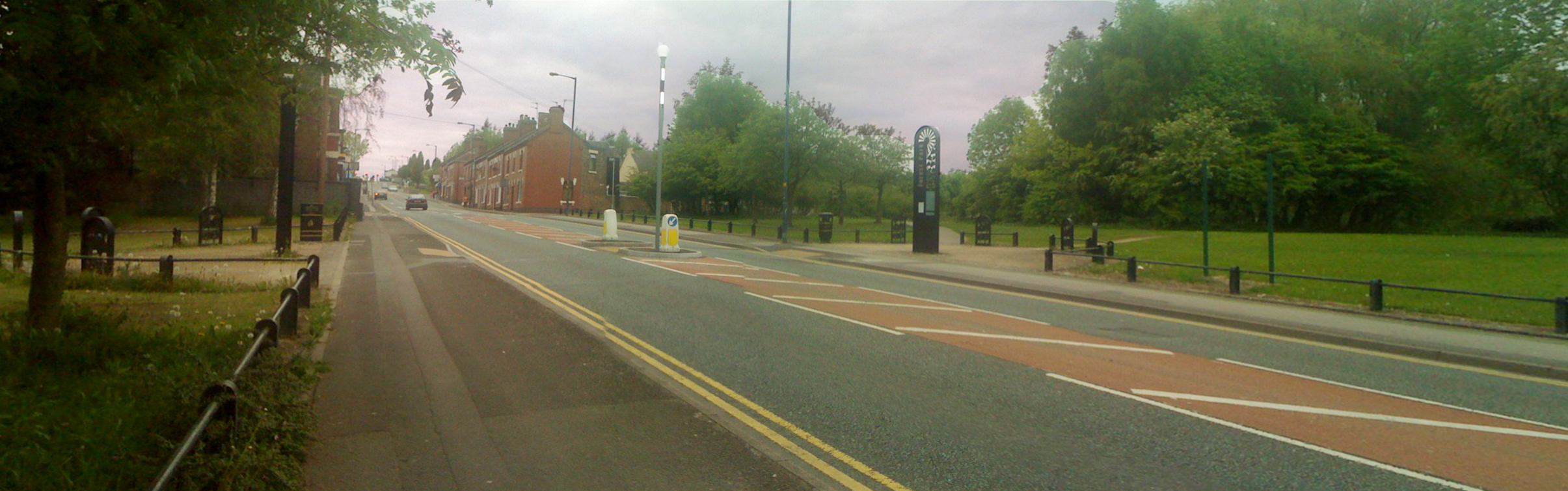
- The site of Waterloo Road station today

General information
- Location: Hanley, City of Stoke-on-Trent, England
- Coordinates: 53.0314°N 2.1826°W
- Grid reference: SJ878482
- Platforms: 2

Other information
- Status: Disused

History
- Original company: North Staffordshire Railway
- Post-grouping: London, Midland and Scottish Railway; London Midland Region of British Railways

Key dates
- 1 April 1900: Opened
- 4 October 1943: Closed to passenger services
- 3 January 1966: Closed to general goods services
- 31 July 1969: Closed completely
Location

Waterloo Road railway station served the north of the town of Hanley, in Staffordshire, England, between 1900 and 1969.

== History ==
The station opened in 1900, as the last station on the Potteries Loop Line by the North Staffordshire Railway, which was also known as the "Knotty".

It was also the first station on the line to close to passengers in 1943, at the height of the Second World War by the London Midland and Scottish Railway. It remained open for general goods traffic until 1966; oil traffic continued on the line to Hanley from Walker's Century Oils, now Fuchs Oil, until 1969.

The line was lifted shortly afterwards.

Preceding station	Disused railways	Following station
Cobridge Line and station closed	North Staffordshire Railway Potteries Loop Line	Hanley Line and station closed

== The site today ==
The station was at the road crossing on Waterloo Road, between the Etruria Loop Line and Hanley Forest Park, near Cobridge. The only remaining traces of the station is one black wall as well as the station master's house.
