= Tunstall railway station =

Former railway station in Staffordshire, England

Tunstall
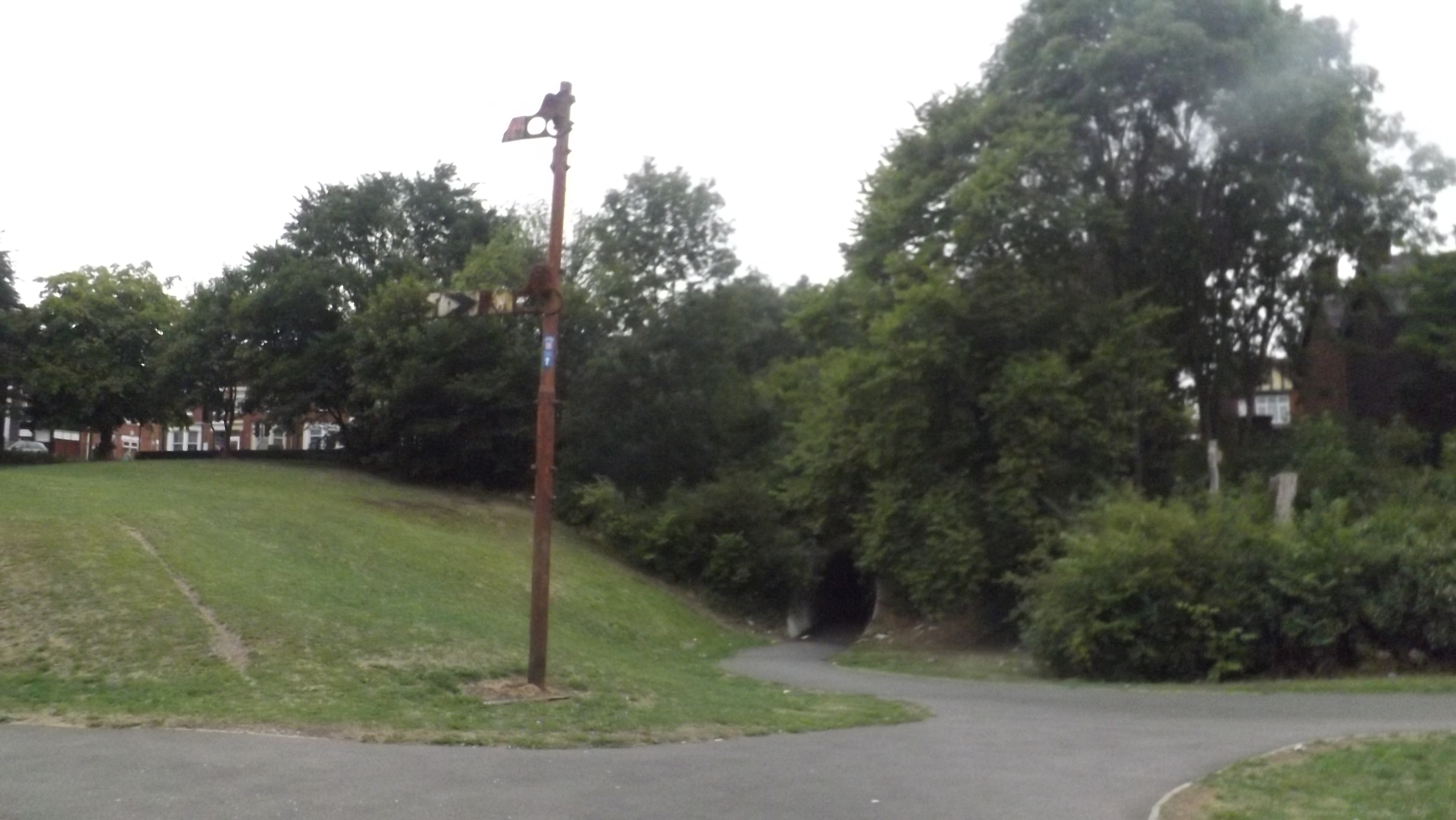

General information
- Location: Tunstall, Stoke-on-Trent, England
- Coordinates: 53.0586°N 2.2061°W
- Grid reference: SJ862512
- Platforms: 2

Other information
- Status: Disused

History
- Original company: North Staffordshire Railway
- Post-grouping: London, Midland and Scottish Railway, London Midland Region of British Railways

Key dates
- 1 December 1873: Opened
- 2 March 1964: Closed for passengers
- 1966: closed for goods
Location

Tunstall railway station served the town of Tunstall, in Staffordshire, England, between 1874 and 1966. It was a stop on the Potteries Loop Line.

== History ==
The station was opened in 1874. The Potteries Loop Line ran between Staffordshire and Cheshire; it connected Stoke-on-Trent with Mow Cop and Scholar Green, via Hanley, Burslem, Kidsgrove.

It was recommended for closure in the 1963 Beeching Report from British Railways; it was closed along with the Potteries Loop Line in 1964 and to goods in 1966.

Preceding station	Disused railways	Following station
Pitts Hill Line and station closed	North Staffordshire Railway Potteries Loop Line	Burslem Line and station closed

== The site today ==
The station has been demolished and the site is now part of the Potteries Greenway. A signal post remains in situ on The Boulevard, which was formerly Station Road, where the Greenway is located.

The station master's house is extant, sited on the A527 road.
