= Sacred Heart Church, Hanley =

Church of the Sacred Heart
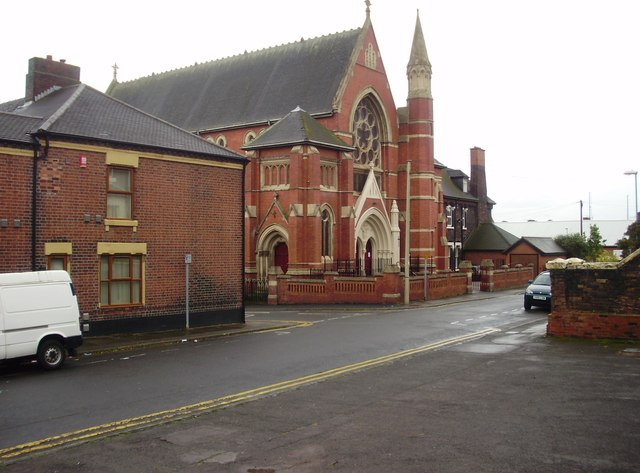
- Church of the Sacred Heart
- 53°1′16.867″N 2°10′25.226″W
- OS grid reference: SJ 88447 47130
- Location: Hanley, Stoke-on-Trent
- Country: England
- Denomination: Roman Catholic
- Website: www.sacredhearthanley.net

History
- Consecrated: 1911

Architecture
- Heritage designation: Grade II listed
- Designated: 18 August 2011
- Architect(s): H. V. Krolow; Robert Scrivener and Sons
- Completed: 1891

Administration
- Diocese: Archdiocese of Birmingham

Sacred Heart Church is a Roman Catholic church in Jasper Street in Hanley, Stoke-on-Trent, England, and in the Archdiocese of Birmingham. The building, completed in 1891, is Grade II listed.

== History ==
Thomas Leith, the priest at Cobridge, was instructed in 1854 to open a mission in Hanley; he raised money and in 1857 bought land on Lower Foundry Street in the town. A building was erected, that from 1858 was a day school and Sunday school. In 1860 the Church of St Mary and St Patrick was opened in Lower Foundry Street by William Molloy, the first resident priest of Hanley. It was designed and built by Messrs. Ward of Hanley, and seated 400. The presbytery was built on a site in Jasper Street, where a church would eventually be built when there were sufficient funds.

The foundation stone of Sacred Heart Church was laid in July 1889 by the Bishop of Birmingham Edward Ilsley. It was opened on 22 September 1891, by Bishop Ilsley assisted by Herbert Vaughan, Bishop of Salford. It was consecrated in 1911; it is thought that the length of time paying off the debt incurred in the construction, which was more than expected, led to the later date of consecration. The church in Lower Foundry Street was afterwards occasionally used until it was sold about 1940.

== Description ==
The building was designed by H. V. Krolow of St Helens and Liverpool, and after his resignation by Robert Scrivener and Sons of Hanley. It is in Gothic style, of brick with stone dressings, and seats 700.

The liturgical west front, on Jasper Street, has a projecting porch with a gable and a double doorway; above the doorway is a tympanum with, in relief, a figure of Christ revealing the Sacred Heart. The porch is within the centre of three bays; above the porch is a window with circular tracery, and the gable end of the nave. There is a brick turret with stone banding, to the right of the central bay.

The nave has a clerestory and there is an apsidal chancel. There are north and south transepts, each with a large central window.

Inside, there are wide aisles. The wide stone altar has statuary; the reredos shows, across the width of the apse, biblical scenes in relief, with an arcade above. There is decorative tiling on the upper walls and ceiling of the apse. The north and south chapels have marble fittings and reredos with biblical scenes, and stencilled walls.
