= Market Street Halt railway station =

Disused railway station in Staffordshire, England

Market Street Halt
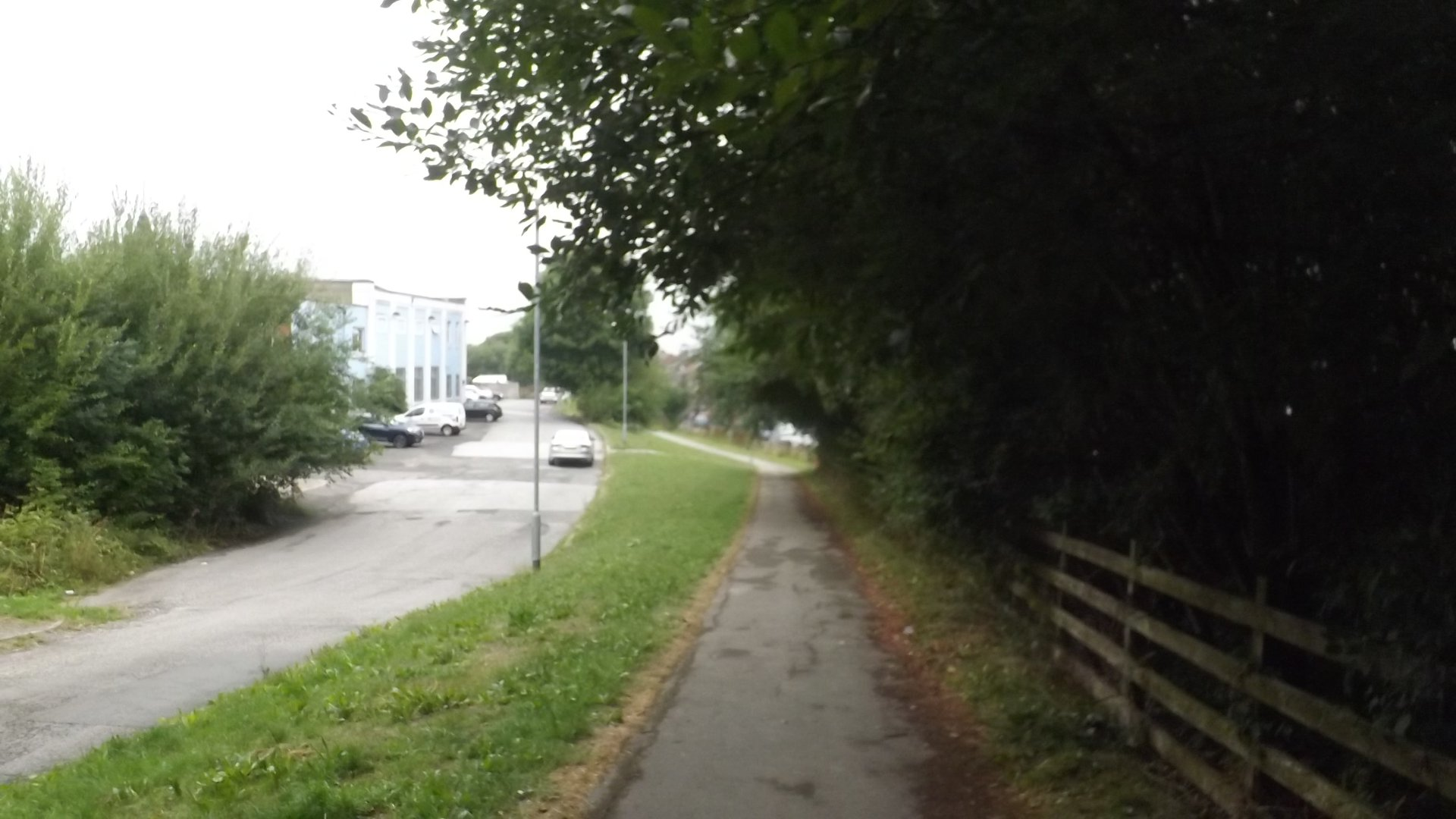
- Site of Market Street Halt

General information
- Location: Kidsgrove, Staffordshire, Newcastle-Under-Lyme; England
- Coordinates: 53.0864°N 2.2374°W
- Grid reference: SJ842543
- Line: Potteries Loop Line
- Platforms: 1

Other information
- Status: Disused

History
- Original company: North Staffordshire Railway
- Post-grouping: London, Midland and Scottish Railway; London Midland Region of British Railways

Key dates
- 1 July 1909: Opened
- 25 September 1950: Closed
Location

Market Street Halt was a halt that served the town of Kidsgrove, Staffordshire, England. It was opened in 1909 and located on the Potteries Loop Line of the North Staffordshire Railway (NSR). At first it was used by trains in both directions but was later served only by northbound trains due to the severe gradient, being a 1 in 40 climb southbound.

Although only a halt, it had a considerable length of platform and modest wooden buildings, plus an old NSR carriage used as a waiting room.

Like the first Loop Line station Waterloo Road which closed to passengers in 1943 and 1966-69 to goods and oil traffic Kidsgrove Market Street Halt itself the second Loop Line Station closed in 1950 to passengers and goods until the Birchenwood factory closed in 1973 and Park Farm from Newchapel and Goldenhill closed in 1976 and then the line was lifted by 1977 and the trackbed is now part of the Potteries Greenway.

Preceding station	Disused railways	Following station
Kidsgrove Liverpool Road Line and station closed	North Staffordshire Railway Potteries Loop Line	Newchapel and Goldenhill Line and station closed
