= Hanley railway station =

Former railway station in Staffordshire, England

Hanley
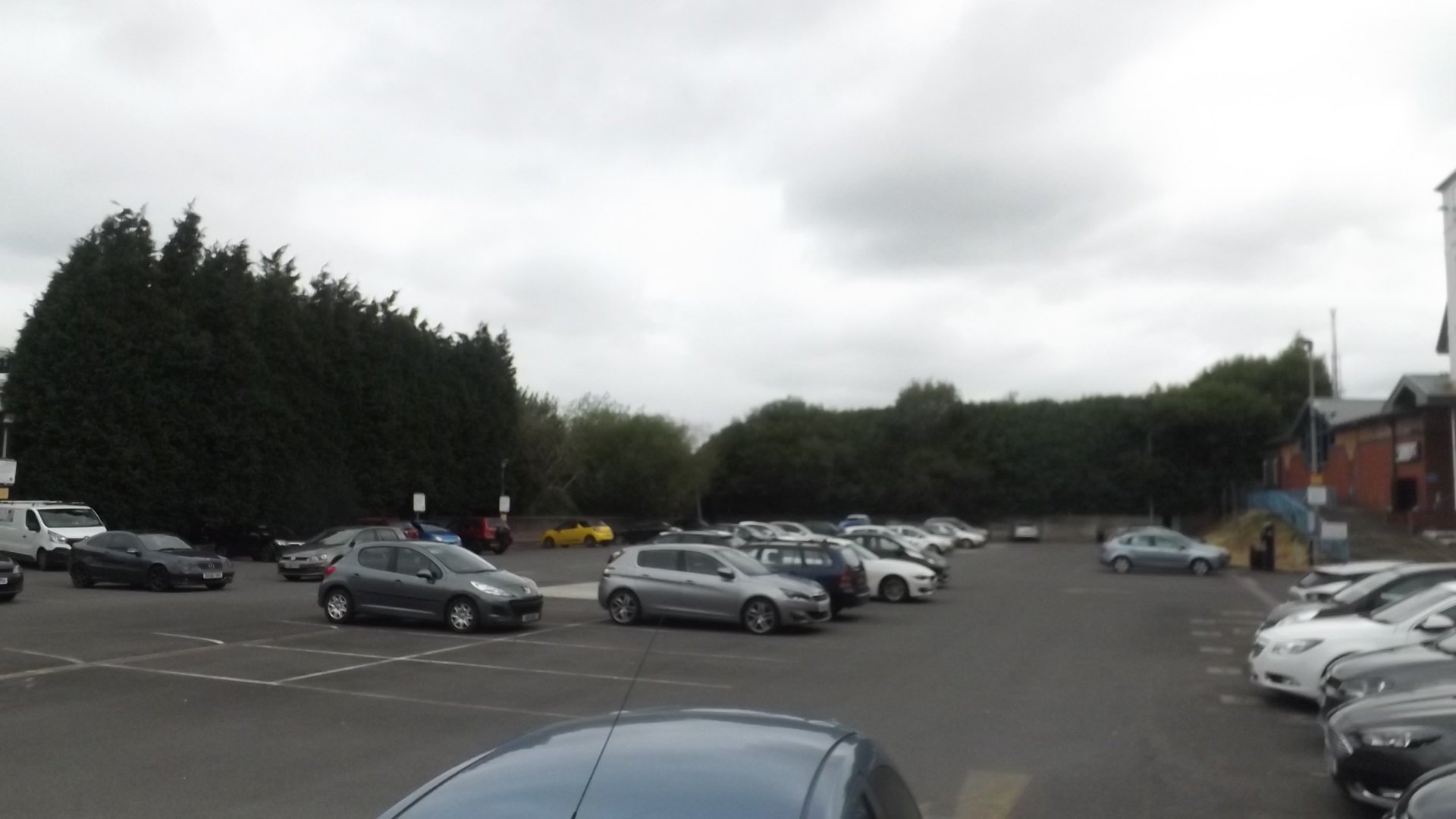

General information
- Location: Hanley, Stoke-on-Trent, England
- Coordinates: 53.0257°N 2.1805°W
- Grid reference: SJ879476
- Platforms: 2

Other information
- Status: Disused

History
- Original company: North Staffordshire Railway
- Post-grouping: London, Midland and Scottish Railway, British Railways (London Midland region)

Key dates
- 13 July 1864: Opened
- 1 November 1873: Relocated to Trinity Street
- 2 March 1964: Closed to passengers
- 1 August 1966: Closed to goods
Location

Hanley railway station served the town of Hanley, in Staffordshire, England, between 1873 and 1966. It was built by the North Staffordshire Railway, as part of the Potteries Loop Line.

== History ==
The North Staffordshire Railway company (1846–1923), which was nicknamed The Knotty, initiated a proposal to build Hanley station in 1861; this included a goods line initially, with passenger services at a later stage.

The original station opened along with the first section of the Loop in 1864. When the second section reached Burslem, the station was moved to a second site in 1873 when it was opened to passengers. The new station was built on a sharp curve (8 chains radius) in a cutting below Trinity Street. The old station remained for goods traffic.

By the time of grouping in 1923, The Knotty merged into the London, Midland and Scottish Railway (LMS), which lasted until 1948. During the Second World War, at the start of the Blitz in 1940, Hanley station suffered damage by the Luftwaffe; the roof was damaged and a fire was set on the wooden passenger bridge, which was not repaired after the war. The trains operated by the LMS during the war would have been used to send soldiers and munitions to Europe at that time to the Western Front or onwards to North Africa amongst British, Colonial and US soldiers.

In 1948, the station and the line moved under the London Midland Region of British Railways. Diesel multiple units were introduced on to the line at the end of the 1950s, as part of a modernisation programme.

Preceding station	Disused railways	Following station
Waterloo Road Line and station closed	North Staffordshire Railway Potteries Loop Line	Etruria Line and station closed

== Closure ==
Hanley railway station was recommended for closure in the Beeching Report in 1963, along with the rest of the Potteries Loop Line with the exception of Waterloo Road and Kidsgrove Market Street Halt.

The station was closed to passengers in 1964 and to goods in 1966.

A decade after closure, the station was demolished. The North Staffordshire Railway Preservation Society rescued the water gauge and preserved it at Cheddleton, on the Churnet Valley Railway.

== The site today ==
Very little of Hanley railway station remains today. Some of the embankments still exist and part of the station wall, at the rear of the car park, is extant. The railway-owned warehouse on Clough Street has been converted into a furniture shop.

== In popular culture ==
Hanley railway station was used in the 1952 crime caper film, Hunted, starring Dirk Bogarde as a fugitive on the run from London to Stoke-on-Trent.

Writer Arnold Bennett, who was born in the town and lived locally, remembers Hanley station in his writing. Examples include "Anna of the Five Towns" (1902) and "The Old Wives' Tale" (1908), in which the five towns' names corresponded closely with their originals; Hanley became Hanbridge.
