= Anna of the Five Towns (TV series) =

British television drama series

- Genre: Period drama
- Based on: Anna of the Five Towns by Arnold Bennett
- Directed by: Martyn Friend
- Starring: Lynsey Beauchamp; Peter Davison
- Composer: Nigel Hess
- Country of origin: United Kingdom
- Original language: English
- No. of series: 1
- No. of episodes: 4

Production
- Producer: Colin Rogers
- Running time: 55 minutes
- Production company: BBC

Original release
- Network: BBC Two
- Release: 9 January – 30 January 1985

Anna of the Five Towns is a 1985 British television drama series, which first aired on BBC 2. It is an adaptation by John Harvey of the 1902 novel of the same title by Arnold Bennett.

== Plot ==
When Anna reaches the age of 21 she inherits a large fortune left to her in trust by her mother. Since her mother's death this money has been managed by her rich but miserly father, Ephraim, who has invested it to great effect. Anna is alarmed by her new found wealth and the responsibilities that go with it, but her affairs remain under the control of her domineering father.

Gradually however, with the help of the wealthy Sutton family, Anna begins to break free from her father's unremitting control of her life. Against his wishes she accepts an invitation to go on holiday with the Suttons. Henry Mynors also joins the party and during the holiday their relationship flourishes.

== Cast ==
- Lynsey Beauchamp as Anna Tellwright (4 episodes)
- Anne Blackman as Beatrice Sutton (4 episodes)
- Katie Carey as Agnes Tellwright (4 episodes)
- Anna Cropper as Mrs. Sutton (4 episodes)
- Peter Davison as Henry Mynors (4 episodes)
- Emrys James as Ephraim Tellwright (4 episodes)
- John Bott as Rev. Banks (3 episodes)
- Edward Kelsey as Titus Price (3 episodes)
- Anton Lesser as Willie Price (3 episodes)
- Hilary Mason as Sarah Vodrey (3 episodes)
- Barrie Cookson as Mr. Sutton (2 episodes)
- Patricia Marks as Miss Dickinson (2 episodes
- Iain Ormsby-Knox as Policeman (2 episodes)
- Georgia Allen as Milkmaid (1 episode)
- Wilfred Grove as Revivalist (1 episode)
- John Lancaster as Searcher (1 episode)
- Geoffrey Larder as Coroner (1 episode)
- Michael Lees as Mr. Lovatt (1 episode)
- Bruce Purchase as Tom Kelly (1 episode)
- Chris Sanders as Dr. Henderson (1 episode)
- Keith Smith as Bank clerk (1 episode)

== Bibliography ==
- Ellen Baskin. Serials on British Television, 1950-1994. Scolar Press, 1996.
