= Waterloo Road =

Waterloo Road may refer to:

== Transportation-related ==
- Waterloo Road, London, England
- Waterloo Road, Hong Kong, an east-west thoroughfare of Kowloon
- Waterloo Road (NSR) railway station, a former railway station of the North Staffordshire Railway
- Waterloo Road, the original name of Blackpool South railway station

== Arts and entertainment ==
- Waterloo Road (film), 1945 British drama starring John Mills
- Waterloo Road (TV series), BBC One drama series about a school and its teachers and students
- "Waterloo Road", 1968 British song by rock band Jason Crest, later recorded & adapted into French as a 1969 single by Joe Dassin entitled "Les Champs-Élysées"

== See also ==
- Waterloo Street, Singapore
