= Newchapel and Goldenhill railway station =

Disused railway station in Staffordshire, England

Newchapel & Goldenhill
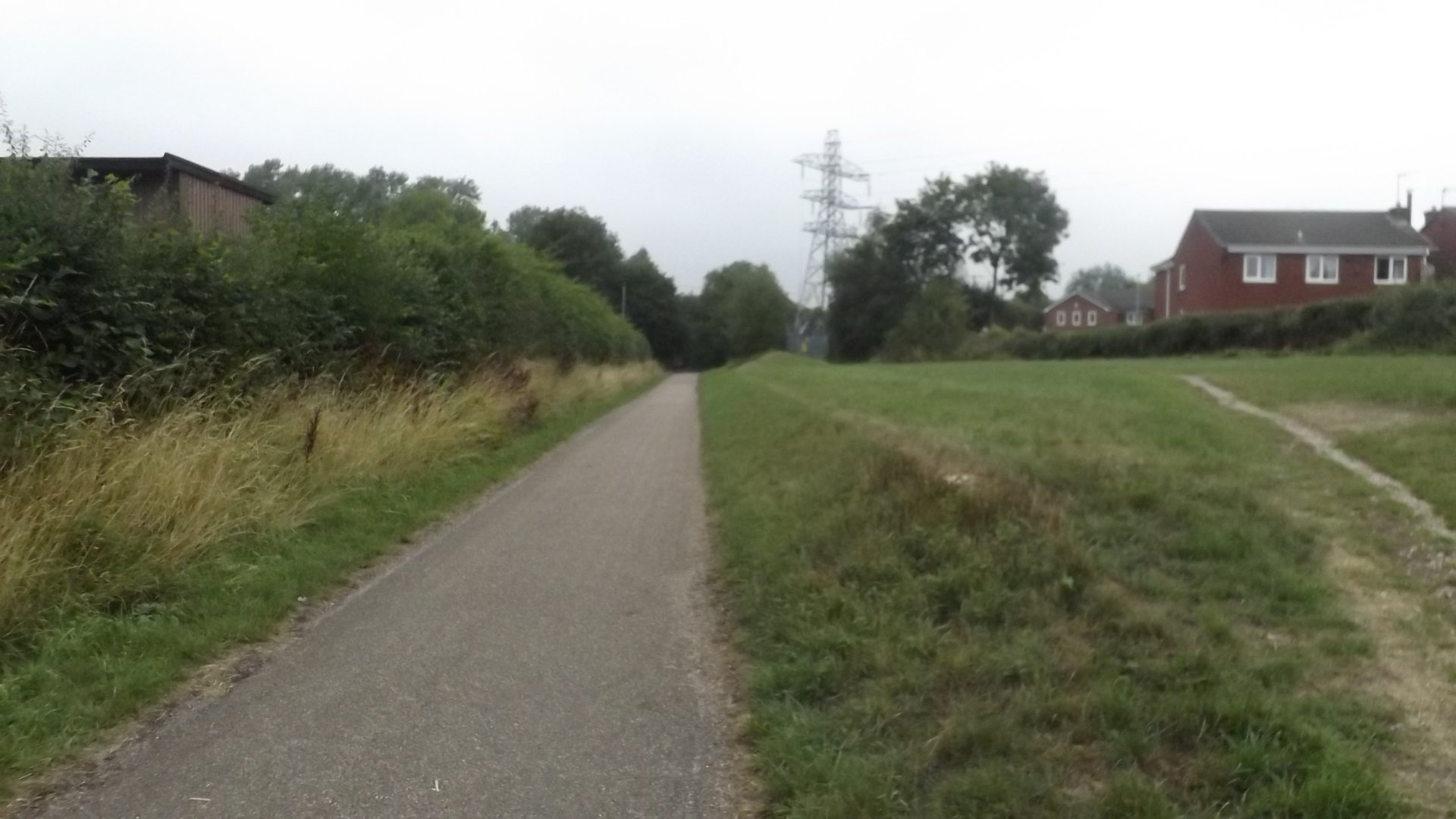
- The site of the closed station in 2018

General information
- Location: Newchapel / Goldenhill, Staffordshire, Newcastle-Under-Lyme; England
- Coordinates: 53.0804°N 2.2081°W
- Grid reference: SJ861537
- Platforms: 2

Other information
- Status: Disused

History
- Original company: North Staffordshire Railway
- Post-grouping: London, Midland and Scottish Railway; London Midland Region of British Railways

Key dates
- 1 October 1874: Opened
- 2 March 1964: Closed
Location

Newchapel and Goldenhill railway station was a station on the Potteries Loop Line located between the villages of Newchapel and Goldenhill in Staffordshire, England, in what is now Packmoor.

Opened in 1874 the station was known simply as Goldenhill (sometimes referred to as Golden Hill) until November 1912 when it was renamed Newchapel and Goldenhill.

The station closed to passengers in 1964 along with the rest of the Loop as with the single line remained until 1976 when Park Farm closed. The trackbed is now a walkway but part of the platform edging is still in existence.

Preceding station	Disused railways	Following station
Market Street Halt Line and station closed	North Staffordshire Railway Potteries Loop Line	Pitts Hill Line and station closed
