= Cobridge =

Area of Stoke-on-Trent, England

Coordinates: 53.0357°N 2.1868°W

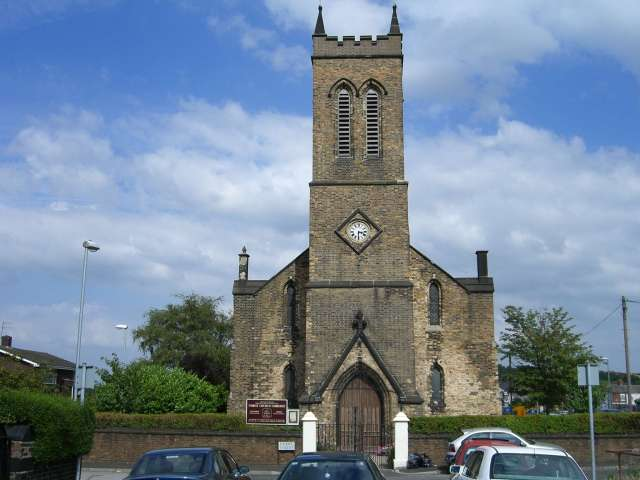
- Christ Church

- Location within Staffordshire
- OS grid reference: SJ875490
- District: City of Stoke-on-Trent
- Shire county: Staffordshire
- Region: West Midlands
- Country: England
- Sovereign state: United Kingdom
- Post town: STOKE-ON-TRENT
- Postcode district: ST1
- Dialling code: 01782
- Police: Staffordshire
- Fire: Staffordshire
- Ambulance: West Midlands

Cobridge is an area of Stoke-on-Trent, in the City of Stoke-on-Trent district, in the county of Staffordshire, England. Cobridge was marked on the 1775 Yates map as 'Cow Bridge' and was recorded in Ward records (1843) as Cobridge Gate.

Cobridge has a community centre, on Bursley Road.

Cobridge once had a railway station on the Potteries Loop Line.

Cobridge was the location of the Athletic Ground, now the site of a sheltered housing and nursing home complex. Circa 1870, it had a population of 3,378 as recorded in the Imperial Gazetteer of England and Wales.

The Headquarters of the Air Training Corps 388 (City of Stoke-on-Trent) Squadron are at the RFCA Centre, Martin Leake House, Waterloo Road.

== Churches ==
=== Christ Church ===
Christ Church, a Grade II listed building, was built in 1840. It was originally a chapel of ease to St John's Church in Burslem, until 1844 when a parish consisting of Cobridge, Sneyd Green and Abbey Hulton was created out of St John's parish. It was enlarged in 1845, and the chancel was extended in 1900. It is built of yellow brick; there is a nave of five bays, each with a lencet window, and a west tower. The west entrance has a moulded arch. It was extensively renovated in 2001.

=== St Peter's Church ===
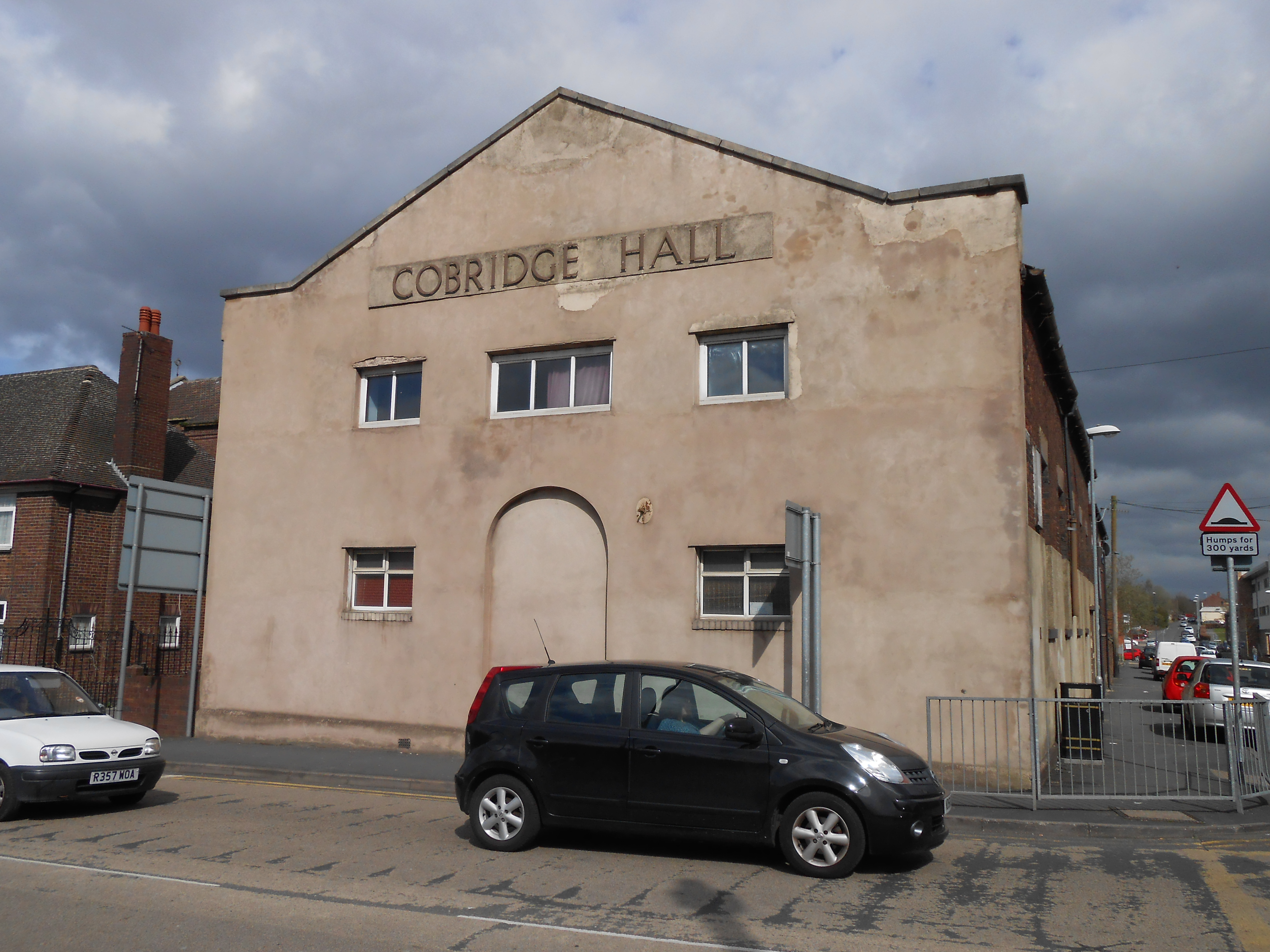
Cobridge Hall, formerly the church hall of St Peter's, on Waterloo Road

The Roman Catholic church of St Peter, with an adjoining presbytery, was built in Cobridge in 1937, on the site of a small chapel built in 1781 near the Rushton Grange estate. The Grange was the first Roman Catholic centre in the area after the Reformation; it had belonged to the Cistercians of the abbey at Hulton until the dissolution of the monasteries in 1528, and was bought two years later by the Biddulphs, a Catholic family.

St Peter's Church closed in 2012, since the congregation was reduced to 40.

== Schools ==
St Peter's Catholic Academy, on Waterloo Road, dates back to 1821. It serves the parishes of St Joseph's Church, Burslem and Sacred Heart Church, Hanley. It caters for children up to age 11.

An inscribed monument at the junction of Sneyd Street and Leek New Road marks the site of Cobridge Free School, built in 1766 for 120 children, and in use until about 1850. It was demolished in 1897.

A Victorian school once stood adjacent to Christ Church on the corner of Emery and Mawdesley Streets. The old Granville school was replaced by the new Forest Park school.

== Other features ==
=== Cobridge Park ===
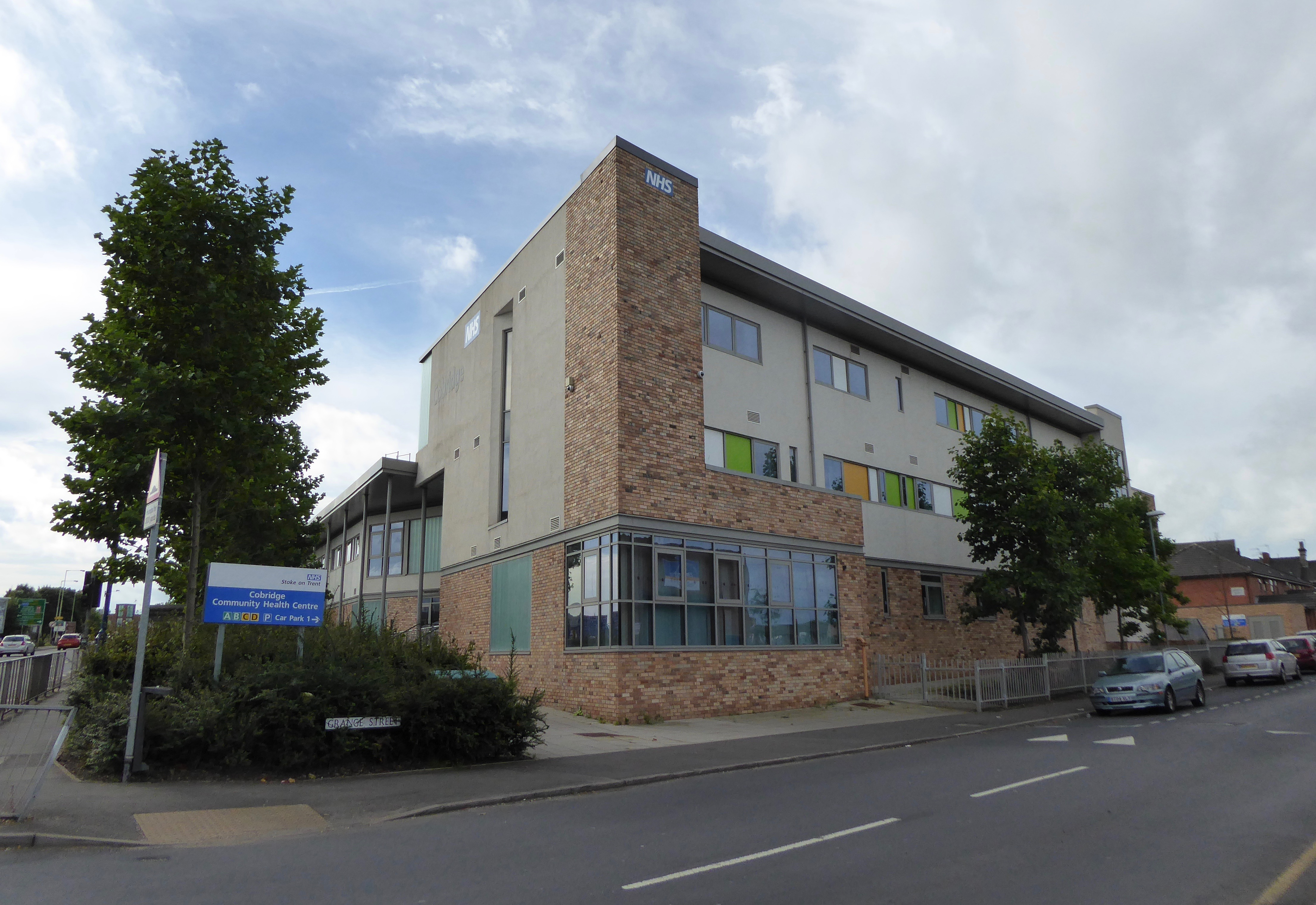
Cobridge Community Health Centre

Cobridge Park, on Elder Road, was opened in 1911. Its area is 9 acres (3.6 ha). It has play facilities for children and teenagers.

=== Community Health Centre ===
The Cobridge Community Health Centre is on Church Terrace. There are two buildings: one is a health centre consisting of two GP practices and other commissioned health service; the other building contains specialised services.

=== Home of Arnold Bennett ===
205 Waterloo Road was the home of the writer Arnold Bennett (1867–1931) from 1880 to 1888. It was built by his father Enoch Bennett at a cost of £900; it is a red brick house with two bays and terracotta decorations. In 1960 it was opened as a museum by Bennett's nephew Richard Bennett, but it is now a private residence. It is a listed building, Grade II.
