= Anna of the Five Towns =

1902 novel by Arnold Bennett

- First edition
- Author: Arnold Bennett
- Language: English
- Genre: Novel
- Publisher: Chatto & Windus
- Publication date: 1902
- Publication place: United Kingdom
- Media type: Print (hardcover)
- Pages: 360pp
- OCLC: 7016739

Anna of the Five Towns is a novel by Arnold Bennett, first published in 1902 and one of his best-known works.

== Plot background ==
The plot centres on Anna Tellwright, daughter of a wealthy but miserly and dictatorial father, living in the Potteries area of Staffordshire, England. Her activities are strictly controlled by the Methodist church. The novel tells of Anna's struggle for freedom and independence against her father's restraints.

== "The Five Towns" ==
In reality, Stoke-on-Trent is an amalgamation (in 1910) of six towns: in order from northwest to southeast, the towns are Tunstall, Burslem, Hanley, Stoke, Fenton and Longton. "The Five Towns" is a name given to it in novels by Arnold Bennett, who was born in Hanley and lived in the district. He said that he believed "Five Towns" was more euphonious than "Six Towns", so he omitted Fenton (sometimes referred to as "the forgotten town"). He called Stoke "Knype" but used recognisable aliases for the other four towns.

== Plot ==
Anna lives with her young step-sister, Agnes, and her twice-widowed father, Ephraim Tellwright, in Bursley. Once an active preacher and teacher in the Methodist movement, her father has become a domestic tyrant and, through his miserly attitude to money, a fairly wealthy man.

On her 21st birthday, Tellwright unceremoniously hands over to Anna an unexpected inheritance from her grandmother: several parcels of shares along with rented residential and industrial property that he has carefully hoarded and re-invested over the years. Anna is now a rich woman but she has no experience in business and financial dealings, save the management of the household expenses her father reluctantly hands her every week.

She visits the rundown ‘building’ (earthenware manufactory) operated by Titus and Willie Price, which she now owns. The Prices’ business is grossly in debt and they claim to be unable to pay the arrears, but manage to give Anna ten pounds. She is also invited to visit the up-to-date and prosperous works of Henry Mynors and is advised by her father to invest in this as a sleeping partner. She is well aware that Mynors, whom she knows through shared church activities, is in love with her but is unsure of her own feelings.

Anna is invited to visit the Isle of Man by Alderman and Mrs Sutton, who see Anna as a suitable friend for their over-indulged daughter, Beatrice. Mynors is also invited. By the end of the visit, Anna and Henry are engaged to be married, but Anna still harbours secret feelings for Willie Price, whom she also knows well from the Methodist movement.

On her return to Bursley, Anna is devastated to learn of the suicide of Titus Price. She blames herself and her father’s squeezing of the Prices’ business but Willie comes to call and explains that the crash of a major customer was the catalyst for his father’s suicide.

It becomes clear that Willie must declare himself bankrupt and the creditors (which include Anna) allow him enough money to emigrate to Australia. Mynors takes the large Price family residence for the marital home, even though it will need much refurbishment. He and Anna agree to marry as soon as possible and make a home for Agnes as well.

Henry discovers a discrepancy in the church accounts and it comes to light that the Prices have been embezzling money in order to prop up their business. Anna and Henry determine to jointly make up the discrepancy so that the Prices will not be blamed. However, the news leaks out and the whole community is soon abuzz.

Anna decides that Willie should not leave Bursley empty-handed and slips a note to him, on condition that he will not read it until he arrives in Melbourne. The note contains a money order (in the book, a 'bank-note') for one hundred pounds.

Anna and Henry marry. No more is heard of Willie Price; the story hints that he too kills himself.

== Adaptations ==
The novel was adapted for the BBC Home Service's Saturday Night Theatre by Olivia Manning in February 1962. In 1985 BBC2 broadcast a four-part serialisation of Anna of the Five Towns, starring Lynsey Beauchamp and Peter Davison and adapted by John Harvey. In 2017, to mark Arnold Bennett's 150th birthday, a stage version of Anna by Deborah McAndrew was put on at the New Vic Theatre in Stoke.

In 2011, Helen Edmundson wrote an adaptation of Anna of the Five Towns which was broadcast in two parts on BBC Radio 4.
