= Mow Cop and Scholar Green railway station =

Former station in Cheshire, England

Mow Cop and Scholar Green
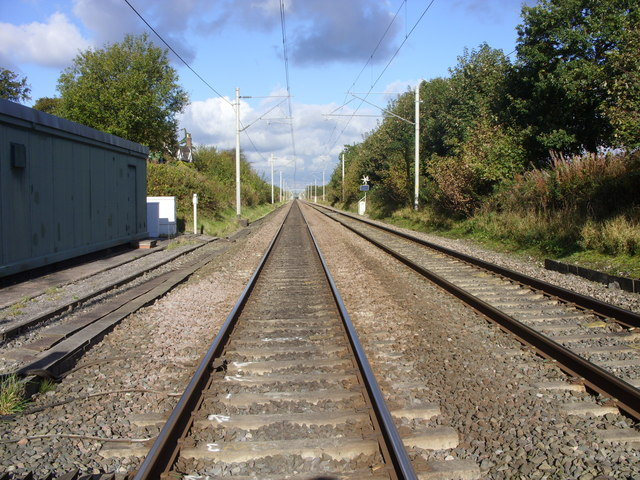
- Site of the former station

General information
- Location: Mow Cop, Cheshire East; England
- Coordinates: 53.1188°N 2.2345°W
- Grid reference: SJ843579
- Platforms: 2

Other information
- Status: Disused

History
- Original company: North Staffordshire Railway
- Post-grouping: London, Midland and Scottish Railway

Key dates
- c. January 1849: Opened as Mow Cop
- c. 1897–8: Renamed Mow Cop (Scholar Green)
- 1905: Platforms extended
- 1923: Renamed Mow Cop and Scholar Green
- 7 September 1964: Closed
Location

Mow Cop and Scholar Green railway station was a station on the North Staffordshire Railway between Stoke-on-Trent and Congleton. It served the village of Mow Cop.

The line was opened by the North Staffordshire Railway on 9 October 1848 but the station at Mow Cop did not open until the beginning of January 1849. It closed in 1964 and was immortalised that year in the song Slow Train by Flanders and Swann.

The signal box survived in use until 2002, and is now preserved privately in the village.

Preceding station	Historical railways	Following station
Congleton Line and station open	North Staffordshire Railway Stafford–Manchester line	Kidsgrove Line and station open
Congleton Line and station open	North Staffordshire Railway Potteries Loop Line	Kidsgrove Liverpool Road Line and station closed
