= Potteries Loop Line =

Former railway line in Staffordshire and Cheshire, England

The Potteries Loop Line was a railway line that ran between Staffordshire and Cheshire in England; it connected Stoke-on-Trent with Mow Cop and Scholar Green. It served three of the six towns of Stoke-on-Trent: Hanley, Burslem and Tunstall, along with Kidsgrove.

== Construction ==
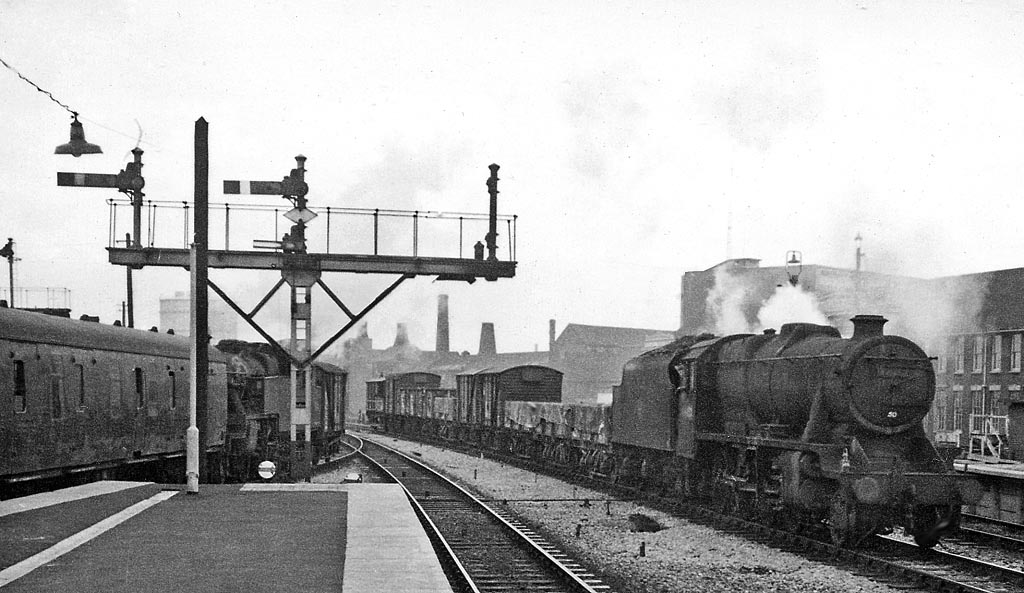
Stoke station (1965)

The North Staffordshire Railway, which was also known as the "Knotty", was a British railway company formed in 1845 to promote a number of lines in the Midlands.

The Potteroes Loop Line was authorised and constructed as follows:

- Etruria - Shelton: authorised for construction on 2 July 1847, opening for goods in 1850 and passengers in January 1862
- Shelton - Hanley: authorised for construction on 13 August 1859, opening to goods on 20 December 1861 and passengers on 13 July 1864.

The entire section to the North Staffordshire Railway main line at Kidsgrove was authorised on 5 July 1865, opening as follows:

- Hanley - Burslem: opened to passengers and goods on 1 November 1873
- Burslem - Tunstall: opened to passengers and goods on 1 December 1873
- Tunstall - Goldenhill: opened to passengers and goods on 1 October 1874
- Goldenhill - Kidsgrove: opened to passengers and goods on 15 November 1875.

It was opened in many short sections, due to the cost of railway construction during the 1870s. The line throughout was sanctioned, but the North Staffordshire Railway felt that the line would be unimportant enough to abandon part way through its construction. This upset residents of the towns through which the line was planned to pass and they eventually petitioned Parliament to force the completion of the route.

North Staffordshire Railway (Potteries Loop Line) Act 1865
- Act of Parliament
- Parliament of the United Kingdom
- Long title: An Act to authorise the North Staffordshire Railway Company to construct certain Railways forming a Loop Line of Railway in the Staffordshire Potteries; and for other Purposes.
- Citation: 28 & 29 Vict. c. cccxxxix

== The route ==
With the towns that the line served being located on hilltops, the geography of the route was renowned for its severe gradients and sharp curves, especially around Tunstall, Burslem and Hanley.

Leaving the main line at Etruria Junction, the line turned almost back on itself to proceed eastwards and passed through part of the Shelton Bar complex. Approaching Hanley, another sharp curve took the route northwards once again. A rising gradient led to Cobridge tunnel and then Burslem, before a 1 in 90 climb to Tunstall. After reaching the summit of the line at Newchapel, a 1 in 40 descent led to a cutting near the Birchenwood Coke Works on the approach to Kidsgrove. It then rejoined the main line at Liverpool Road Junction, north of the junction to Crewe.

== Decline ==
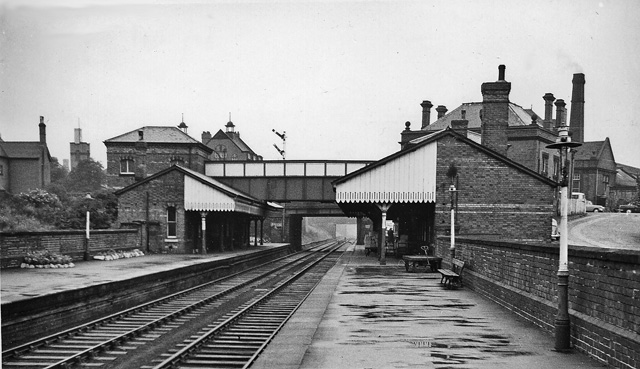
Burslem station (1962)

The Loop's heyday was the early part of the 20th century. In 1910, there were almost 40 trains per day using the route, operated mainly by trains composed of close-coupled four wheel coaches.

By 1910, Hanley had become the largest of the Six Towns, but the line only served the areas where a fraction of its workforce lived. From the 1920s, the line began to fall victim to road competition. A traffic survey carried out in the middle of 1956 showed that one mid-morning train carried just four passengers, three of whom were railwaymen travelling for free. Services were cut back later that year and, by 1961, there were just five passenger trains daily from Stoke-on-Trent to Hanley and Tunstall, none of which ran outside of peak hours.

As far as goods traffic was concerned, much of it had been transferred to road as the 1950s dawned.

The Beeching Axe signalled the final blow for passenger services and services were withdrawn on 2 March 1964.

== Post-Beeching Axe ==
Freight workings continued for some years afterwards. In 1967, trains were frequently diverted onto the Loop Line between Longport and Kidsgrove, via the Pinnox branch, during the electrification of the West Coast Main Line; the upgrading of which involved construction of a new line avoiding the Harecastle railway tunnel.

The section from Etruria to Waterloo Road remained open for oil traffic from Century Oils in Hanley; this traffic ceased on 31 July 1969.

On 24 September 1972, British Rail ran a special passenger service on the line as an experiment to see whether a revival of passenger services on what remained of the line was commercially viable.

The northern part of the route remained open until 1976 to transport coal from an open-cast mine at Park Farm, near Goldenhill.
