= Listed buildings in Stoke-on-Trent =

Stoke-on-Trent is a city in Staffordshire, England. Known as The Potteries and is the home of the pottery industry in the United Kingdom. Formed in 1910 from six towns, the city has almost 200 listed buildings within the city. Many of these are connected with the pottery industry and the people involved with it.

The term "listed building", in the United Kingdom, refers to a building or structure designated as being of special architectural, historical, or cultural significance under the Planning (Listed Buildings and Conservation Areas) Act 1990. They are categorised in three grades: Grade I consists of buildings of outstanding architectural or historical interest, Grade II* includes significant buildings of more than local interest and Grade II consists of buildings of special architectural or historical interest. Buildings in England are listed by the Secretary of State for Culture, Media and Sport on recommendations provided by English Heritage, which also determines the grading.

== Key ==
Grade	Criteria
I	Buildings of exceptional interest, sometimes considered to be internationally important
II*	Particularly important buildings of more than special interest.
II	Buildings of national importance and special interest.

== Listed buildings and structures ==
Name and location	Photograph	Grade	Date	Notes
Mausoleum for the Marquis of Stafford grid reference SJ 8680 4106; 52°58′0″N 2°11′53″W		I	c.1808	The mausoleum for the Marquis of Stafford was designed by Charles Heathcote Tatham. Built of ashlar in a neo-Egyptian style it is the only Grade I listed building in the city.
Farmhouse, Garden Street, Penkhull grid reference SJ 8682 4478; 53°0′1″N 2°11′52″W		II	c.1780	Late 18th-century T-plan farmhouse with 19th-century additions and modifications. Probably built around 1780 when Josiah Spode II leased the farm.
The Vine Public House, Naylor Street, Pitshill grid reference SJ 8674 5227; 53°4′3″N 2°11′57″W		II	c.1875	Rare surviving example of 19th-century back street public house that retains original layout and fittings.
Hanley St Lukes Church of England Primary School grid reference SJ 8883 4753; 53°1′30″N 2°10′5″W		II	1893	Late Victorian school building in Vernacular Revival style. Incorporates a large number of contemporary tiles from the nearby Mintons pottery.
Chest tombs of Whalley and Broade family, Stoke Minster grid reference SJ 8790 4519; 53°0′14″N 2°10′54″W		II	1796–1844	Located in the churchyard of St. Peter ad Vincula, Stoke a pair of Chest tombs from late 18th and mid 19th centuries commemorates members of the Whalley and Broade families.
Fragment of Anglo-Saxon Cross, Stoke Minster grid reference SJ 8788 4516; 53°0′13″N 2°10′55″W		II	c.900	Located in the churchyard of St. Peter ad Vincula, Stoke, a fragment of an early 10th century Anglo-Saxon cross that was re-erected in the mid 19th century on a tooled base surrounded by railings by local architect and amateur archaeologist Charles Lynam.
Remains of earlier church in St Peter's churchyard grid reference SJ 8792 4513; 53°0′12″N 2°10′53″W		II	13th century	13th century arch from a previous church building on the site of St. Peter ad Vincula, Stoke. The stones were reassembled by local architect and amateur archaeologist Charles Lynam in the 1880s.
North Staffordshire School for the Deaf, Hartshill grid reference SJ 8688 4526; 53°0′16″N 2°11′49″W		II	1803	Early 19th century ashlar and brick house built for the potter Josiah Spode. Now the North Staffordshire School for the Deaf.
Elm House, Handley Street, Tunstall grid reference SJ 8677 5446; 53°5′14″N 2°11′56″W		II	c.1780	Late 17th-century farmhouse, now a house. Extended in the mid-18th century
Pottery works formerly occupied by Dudson's Ltd, Hannover Street, Hanley grid reference SJ 8805 4800; 53°1′45″N 2°10′47″W		II	c.1820	Pottery works comprising a number of buildings surrounding a central courtyard and kiln. Originally built in the 1820s substantial modifications were made in 1872.
283 Hartshill Road, Hartshill grid reference SJ 8663 4578; 53°1′45″N 2°10′47″W		II	c.1840	Early 19th century one and a half storied cottage in the Gothic Revival style.
Holy Trinity Church, Hartshill grid reference SJ 8654 4583; 53°0′35″N 2°12′7″W		II*	1842	Designed by George Gilbert Scott and William Bonython Moffatt, Holy Trinity is the parish church and was constructed in 1842 in the Gothic Revival style. The church was endowed by Herbert Minton, son of the founder of Thomas Minton & Sons.
Ford Hayes farmhouse grid reference SJ 9247 4616; 53°0′46″N 2°6′49″W		II	c.1780	A farmhouse dating from the late 18th century. It was the birthplace and childhood home of Hugh Bourne, the founder of Primitive Methodism.
Christ Church, Tunstall grid reference SJ 8595 5171; 53°3′45″N 2°12′40″W		II	1831–1832	A Commissioners' church built in the early 1830s. It was designed by Francis Bedford and is of stone construction with a slate roof.
Boundary Works, King Street, Longton grid reference SJ 9078 4376; 52°59′28″N 2°8′19″W		II	1819	Early 19th century pottery works formerly occupied by Leo Samuels Ltd. Of brick construction with a tiled roof
Bottle ovens and chimney at Albion Works, King Street, Longton grid reference SJ 9081 4369; 52°59′26″N 2°8′18″W		II	c.1900	Two brick built Bottle ovens with attendant chimney stack
Sutherland Institute & Library, Lightwood Road, Longton grid reference SJ 9118 4293; 52°59′1″N 2°7′58″W		II	1898	Designed by local architects Wood & Hutchings and built of brick picked out with terracotta, the three-storey building was constructed on land donated by the 4th Duke of Sutherland and named in his honour. A decorative Bass-relief Frieze in terracotta depicting the pottery, mining and metal working industries was added in 1908.
Former School of Art, London Road, Stoke grid reference SJ 8755 4501; 53°0′8″N 2°11′13″W		II	c.1853	Mid 19th century art school designed by Edward Pugin and his partner James Murray. Built of brick interspersed with stone bands and dressings and with a slate roof. Now used as offices.
45, 47 & 49 Longton Road, Trentham grid reference SJ 8718 4089; 52°57′55″N 2°11′32″W		II	1875	Terrace of 3 cottages in the Arts and Crafts style built for the Sutherland estate. Brick with timber framing and plain tiled roof.
51 & 53 Longton Road, Trentham grid reference SJ 8717 4093; 52°57′56″N 2°11′33″W		II	c.1870	A pair of timber-framed cottages with brick infill in a herringbone pattern. Built on the plinth of an earlier 18th-century structure and incorporating some brickwork from the earlier period in a bay on the left hand side.
Church of St Thomas the Apostle, Penkhull grid reference SJ 8691 4480; 53°0′1″N 2°11′47″W		II	1842	Designed by George Gilbert Scott, the parish church of Penkhull is a spired building of squared sandstone. In the late 19th century aisles were added.
36 Market Place, Burslem grid reference SJ 8675 4981; 53°2′44″N 2°11′56″W		II	c.1780	Late 18th century 3 storeyed shop of Stuccoed brick.
Old Town Hall, Burslem grid reference SJ 8683 4984; 53°2′45″N 2°11′52″W		II*	1854	The second Town Hall built in Burslem, this two storeyed ashlar building was designed in the Baroque Revival style by G. T. Robinson. Since it ceased to be the Town Hall, it has been used variously as a library, recreation centre, a pottery museum (Ceramica) and most recently a sixth form college.
Middleport Pottery grid reference SJ8603 4930; 53°2′28″N 2°12′34″W		II*	1888	Middleport Pottery situated on the Trent and Mersey Canal in Stoke-on-Trent, was built by Burgess and Leigh in the late nineteenth century. The main building is a long two-storey, 34-bay brick and terracotta structure.
Former school house at Stoke Union Workhouse, Newcastle Road, Hartshill grid reference SJ 8564 4526; 53°0′16″N 2°12′55″W		II	1842	Now situated within the grounds of the City General Hospital, the 2 storeyed, 15 bay workhouse schoolhouse is of Flemish bond brickwork picked out with Staffordshire blue brick headers.
Warehouse in Price and Kensington Works, Newcastle Street, Longport grid reference SJ 8575 4967; 53°2′39″N 2°12′50″W		II	c.1820	Early 19th century warehouse inside the pottery works of Price and Kensington. Of brick construction with hipped tile roof.
Sutherland Works, Normacot Road, Longton grid reference SJ 9134 4304; 52°59′5″N 2°7′49″W		II	c.1850	19th century pottery works, including 2 bottle ovens. Main building is 2 storeyed with 13 bays of brick with Staffordshire blue brick dressings. The ovens are circular and are contained with the rear ranges of the works.
Etruria Hall, Etruria grid reference SJ 8700 4766; 53°1′34″N 2°11′43″W		II	c.1770	Designed for Josiah Wedgwood by Joseph Pickford, Etruria Hall is a 3 storeyed, 5 bayed hall brick structure with a 2 storeyed wing on each side. Extensively rebuilt in the 19th century the hall later became offices for Shelton Iron & Steel Company and now forms part of a hotel on the site of the 1986 National garden Festival.
Etruscan Bone Mill, Etruria grid reference SJ 8721 4682; 53°1′7″N 2°11′31″W		II*	1857	Mid 19th century bone mill built of brick with a slate roof. Now forms part of the Etruria Industrial Museum.
War Memorial, Albert Square, Fenton grid reference SJ 8907 4455; 52°59′53″N 2°9′51″W		II	c.1919	Ashlar cenotaph erected to commemorate the fallen of the First World War. On one side of the monument is a bas-relief figure of a soldier with reversed arms.
War Memorial, Albion Square, Hanley grid reference SJ 8831 4741; 53°1′26″N 2°10′32″W		II	c. 1920	Ashlar pedestal surmounted by larger than life sized bronze statue of Victory.
Bethesda Methodist Chapel, Hanley grid reference SJ 8822 4735; 53°1′24″N 2°10′37″W		II*	1819	Two storeyed chapel of brick with stuccoed façade and slate roof. Built in 1819 with substantial additions in 1859 and 1887
Barn and stables at Bemersley Farm grid reference SJ 8844 5456; 53°5′17″N 2°10′26″W		II	c.1800	A U-shaped set of farm buildings built at the turn of the 18th and 19th centuries of sandstone and brick with ashlar dressings and a tiled roof. Used by Hugh Bourne as premised to print early books connected with Primitive Methodism
Abbey Farmhouse, Birches Head Road grid reference SJ 9023 4922; 53°2′25″N 2°8′49″W		II	c.1800	Of brick with some stonework reputedly stone from Hulton Abbey, most of the farmhouse dates from the early 19th century but there is evidence of earlier buildings on the site.
1 Brook Street, Stoke grid reference SJ 8794 4527; 53°0′17″N 2°10′52″W		II	c.1870	Originally a house but now offices, 1 Brook Street was built of brick and stone in Tudor Gothic style in the mid to late 19th century.
Tunstall Market, Butterfield Place, Tunstall grid reference SJ 8606 5126; 53°3′30″N 2°12′34″W		II	1856	Built in 1856 to the design of G. T. Robinson, the market is in the Neoclassical style of brick interspersed with Staffordshire blue brick bands and stone dressing. The entrance is of ashlar.
The Red House, Chadwick Street, Longton grid reference SJ 9122 4325; 52°59′13″N 2°7′55″W		II	c.1840	A brick structure, built as a house then subsequently used as a store for items from the decorating kiln at Gladstone pottery works.
Enson Pottery Works, Chelson Street, Longton grid reference SJ 9147 4303; 52°59′5″N 2°7′43″W		II	c.1890	Late 19th century pottery works with 4 bottle kilns inside the range of buildings.
St Bartholomew's Church, Blurton grid reference SJ 8988 4189; 52°58′27″N 2°9′7″W		II	1626	Incorporating early 16th century remains, most of St Bartholomew's dates from 1626. Built of sandstone there are later additions of a chancel in 1750, a bellcote designed by George Gilbert Scott in 1846 and a north aisle by Charles Lynham in 1867.
Black Boy Inn, Cobridge grid reference SJ 8758 4845; 53°2′0″N 2°11′12″W		II	c.1750	A former inn, now a house dating from the mid 18th century. Of brick with lined stucco overlay
266 & 270 Endon Road, Norton grid reference SJ 9027 5235; 53°4′6″N 2°8′48″W		II	c.1798	The former parish workhouse was converted into two cottages in 1839. A two-storey building of coursed rubble.
St Saviour's Church, Smallthorne grid reference SJ 8839 5040; 53°3′3″N 2°10′29″W		II	c.1840	A mid-19th-century parish church built of random rubble with ashlar facings
Three bottle ovens in premises occupied by Bayer United Kingdom Ltd grid reference SJ 8919 4476; 53°0′0″N 2°9′45″W		II	c.1900	Three calcining ovens; two square based and one conical in shape. All built of brick with iron banding
Elm Tree Cottage grid reference SJ 8679 4485; 53°0′3″N 2°11′54″W		II	1694	Two storey, two bayed cottage dating from 1694 in red and blue brick and extensively modified in the 18th and 19th centuries
Chest tomb to John Fenton in St Peter's churchyard grid reference SJ 8794 4512; 53°0′12″N 2°10′52″W		II	1694	Tomb of John Fenton, stone chest restored in 1888
Church of St Bartholomew, Norton in the Moors grid reference SJ 8940 5148; 53°3′38″N 2°9′34″W		II	1738	Brick and dressed stone parish church built in 1738 by Richard Trubshaw. Chancel remodelled and North and South chapels added by John Herbert Beckett between 1914 and 1916.
The Views grid reference SJ 8700 4486; 53°0′53″N 2°11′42″W		II	early 19th century	The birthplace of Oliver Lodge, The Views are a pair of two storeyed painted brick houses
Regent Theatre grid reference SJ 8825 4748; 53°1′28″N 2°10′36″W		II*	1929	Art Deco style building built by W E Trent as a cinema for Provincial Cinematograph Theatres Limited. Steel framed with brick and glazed terracotta (faience) cladding. Renamed the Gaumont in 1950 and the Odeon in 1976, the cinema closed in 1989 but was refitted and reopened as a theatre in 1999.
225, Prince's Road, Hartshill grid reference SJ 8692 4543; 53°0′22″N 2°11′47″W		II	c.1810	Yellow brick lodge with Doric columned portico
36, 38 & 40 Queen Street, Burslem grid reference SJ 8678 4973; 53°2′41″N 2°11′55″W		II	1868	Row of three shops, of brick and stone construction with slate roof
Wedgwood Institute grid reference SJ 8687 4975; 53°2′41″N 2°11′50″W		II*	1869	Two storeyed, redbrick with terracotta panelling and friezes. Used as a library and art school, now empty. Named by The Victorian Society as one of the 2010 top ten most at-risk Victorian buildings in England and Wales.
Hartshill cemetery chapels grid reference SJ 8643 4538; 53°0′20″N 2°12′13″W		II	c.1850	Brick Neo-Romanesque style chapels in the Hartshill cemetery. Designed by Charles Lynam in the mid nineteenth century
Cliff Vale Pottery and kilns grid reference SJ 8723 4644; 53°0′54″N 2°11′30″W		II	1887	Pottery works of brick with stone dressing. The two surviving kilns have joined bases but separate chimneys
Duke of Bridgewater Inn grid reference SJ 8576 4960; 53°2′37″N 2°12′50″W		II	early 19th century	A three storeyed brick inn, originally used as a dwelling house by the master potter of Bottom Bridge pottery but has been in continuous use as a public house since the 1850s. The inn is named after Francis Egerton, 3rd Duke of Bridgewater, one of the originators of the nearby Trent & Mersey canal.
Cemetery Lodge, Shelton grid reference SJ 8773 4632; 53°0′51″N 2°11′3″W		II	c.1860	Yellow brick lodge at the entrance to Shelton cemetery
Sunnyside Cottage grid reference SJ 8701 4077; 52°57′51″N 2°11′41″W		II	early 17th century	Two cottages, formerly part of the estate of the Dukes of Sutherland. The timber-framed buildings have brick infill and tile roofs. One cottage has a number of outbuildings including a bakehouse still with its chimney stack.
Aynsley China Works, Longton grid reference SJ 9137 4340; 52°59′16″N 2°7′21″W		II	1879	The northern range of buildings belonging to Aynsley China the building encompasses a wide range of architectural styles in a long frontage. One gatehouse is dated 1879 but the entire range was built over a longer period in the second half of the 19th century
Tunstall library grid reference SJ 8610 5130; 53°3′32″N 2°12′32″W		II	1889	Built as the Victoria Institute, the public library and adjoining public baths were built of red brick with terracotta dressings. The library is of 3 storeys and the baths 2 storeys joined by a common courtyard
3 & 4, The Villas grid reference SJ 8724 4441; 52°59′49″N 2°11′30″W		II	1851	The Villas is an estate of 24 houses designed by Charles Lynam. Numbers 3 & 4 are a pair of semi-detached houses of brick overlaid with stucco and are designed in the Italianate style with concrete tiled roofs
15, The Villas grid reference SJ 8715 4453; 52°59′52″N 2°11′35″W		II	1851	The Villas is an estate of 24 houses designed by Charles Lynam. Number 15 is a detached house of brick overlaid with stucco and are designed in the Italianate style with a slate tiled roof. One of the former occupiers was Arnold Machin, the artist and designer.
18, The Villas grid reference SJ 8720 4450; 52°59′52″N 2°11′32″W		II	1851	The Villas is an estate of 24 houses designed by Charles Lynam. Number 18 is a detached house of brick overlaid with stucco and are designed in the Italianate style with a slate tiled roof.
Tontine shops grid reference SJ 8840 4758; 53°1′31″N 2°10′28″W		II	1837	A former butcher market now a shopping centre. A single storey rectangular building in ashlar with 5 bayed façade. Built in Greek revival style, it was remodelled in the 1990s after the market closed.
Tunstall clock tower grid reference SJ 8593 5125; 53°3′30″N 2°12′41″W		II	1893	A yellow terracotta tower built to commemorate Vice-Admiral Smith Child. Square in section, one side contains the door to the clock room and the other three carry panels showing the names of those who donated to the building of the memorial.
Hanley Telephone Exchange grid reference SJ 8809 4758; 53°1′31″N 2°10′45″W		II	c.1900	The offices and exchange of the National Telephone Company, a three-storey building in red brick and terracotta. Above the main door is the name "Telephone Buildings" in terracotta.
Gladstone Pottery Museum grid reference SJ 9130 4326; 52°59′12″N 2°7′52″W		II*	c.1860	Now a museum, the former Gladstone pottery works date mostly from 1860 but there are elements that date back to the start of the 19th century and earlier. The main building range is a long 3 storey building and behind it are a number of kilns and other building ranges arranged around a central courtyard.
184 & 186 Waterloo Road grid reference SJ 8724 4920; 53°2′24″N 2°11′30″W		II	c.1850	A pair of brick houses with scallop tiled roofs and stuccoed porches.
Queen's Theatre grid reference SJ 8690 4994; 53°2′48″N 2°11′48″W		II	1911	Burslem's third Town Hall designed by the firm of Russell & Cooper is built in ashlar. The front has a full height portico with Corinthian columns. Very soon after completion it became an entertainment venue, Queen's Hall, and in 1966 it became known as the Queen's Theatre.
Wade Heath Pottery Works grid reference SJ 8862 4491; 53°2′47″N 2°12′4″W		II	1814	Early 19th century pottery works comprising two ranges at right angles to each other with angled corner that formed the original entrance. Ornate pediment and Palladian windows to entrance building.
Statue of Josiah Wedgwood, Winton Square grid reference SJ 9798 4567; 53°0′30″N 2°10′50″W		II	1862	Bronze statue by Edward Davies of Josiah Wedgwood holding a copy of the Portland Vase.
Longton Cemetery chapels grid reference SJ 9084 4282; 52°58′58″N 2°8′17″W		II	1868	Two timber framed, slate roofed chapels. Each of three bays with tower above
Former Registrar's office, Longton Cemetery grid reference SJ 9082 4290; 52°59′0″N 2°8′17″W		II	1869	Two storey office building of wood framing with brick infill and tiled roof. Coat of arms of Longton carried above the porch
Falcon Works grid reference SJ 8738 4494; 53°0′6″N 2°11′22″W		II	1902–1905	Early 20th century extension to 1858 works. Comprises two brick built ranges (one single storeyed, one three storeyed) incorporating two kilns in the single storey range. The three storeyed building has a stone plaque of a falcon set in the gable.
1 & 2, The Villas grid reference SJ 8728 4440; 52°59′48″N 2°11′47″W		II	1851–1855	A pair of stucco over brick houses. Concrete tiled roofs, designed by Charles Lynam as part of The Villas Stokeville
17 & 17A, The Villas grid reference SJ 8719 4451; 52°59′52″N 2°11′33″W		II	1851–1855	A pair of stucco over brick houses. Concrete tiled roofs, designed by Charles Lynam as part of The Villas Stokeville
Church of St John the Evangelist, Hanley grid reference SJ 8836 4787; 53°1′41″N 2°10′30″W		II*	1788–1790	Now disused church, originally built late 18th century with 19th-century additions. Of brick construction with stones dressings and a slate roof. Includes cast iron components in its construction including the window frames, caastellations and gallery columns. This use of cast iron is the second earliest known in the country (the only known earlier examples are in the Church of St James, Liverpool).
Harecastle Tunnels, northern portals grid reference SJ 8490 5177; 53°3′47″N 2°13′36″W		II	1766	The northern portals of Harecastle Tunnels on the Trent and Mersey Canal were built 60 years apart by James Brindley (1766–1777) and Thomas Telford (1824–1827). Brindley's tunnel mouth is of brick and Telford's is of stone, both set in a brick retaining wall
Trent and Mersey Canal lodge, Harecastle grid reference SJ 8490 5177; 53°3′47″N 2°13′37″W		II	1827	The canal lodge at the northern end of Harecastle tunnel. A whitewashed brick building of two storeys and a slate roof
Church of the Holy Evangelists, Normacot grid reference SJ 9201 4239; 52°58′44″N 2°7′14″W		II	1847	Normacot parish church. Built to the order of the 2nd Duke of Sutherland by George Gilbert Scott and later extended with the addition of a north aisle by John Lewis in the 1890s. Construction is of stone with a tiled roof.
Church of St James, Longton grid reference SJ 9144 4313; 52°59′7″N 2°7′44″W		II	1834	A Commissioners' church designed by James Trubshaw. Built of ashlar sandstone, later interior modifications added new windows and an organ chamber.
Royal Doulton, St Mary's Pottery grid reference SJ 9174 4295; 52°59′2″N 2°7′28″W		II	1862	The two storey range at the northwest end of the St Mary's pottery was built in 1862 of brick and terracotta. Originally the works of Samuel Moore, they later became the works of Thomas C Wild & Co and later Royal Doulton. Formed of 13 bays a further range of 8 bays was added in 1888.
St Mark's Church, Shelton grid reference SJ 87891 46861; 53°01′08.08″N 2°10′55.05″W		II	1834	A Commissioners' church completed in 1834, chancel added in 1866.
Our Lady of the Angels and St Peter in Chains Church, Stoke grid reference SJ8738345664; 53.0081°N 2.1895°W		II	1857	Gothic Revival Roman Catholic church designed by Charles Hansom and built in 1857.
St John's Church, Goldenhill grid reference SJ 8543 5309; 53°4′30″N 2°13′8″W		II	1840	Parish church built 1840–41. Designed by Stanley of Shelton. A brick building, in Romanesque style.
Library building, London Road, Stoke grid reference SJ 8754 4500; 53°0′8″N 2°11′13″W		II	1878	Library and Shakespeare Institute, built in 1878, designed by Charles Lynam. Brick with stone dressing; there are tiled panels, and a mosaic depicting Shakespeare in a central panel.
Sacred Heart Church, Tunstall grid reference SJ 86442 51304; 53°03′31.73″N 2°12′13.49″W		II	1930	Romanesque style Roman Catholic church, completed in 1930.
Burslem War Memorial grid reference SJ 8694 4981; 53.04550°N 2.19617°W		II	1920	Made of sandstone ashlar. A niche on the front contains a figure of a soldier with bowed head, rifle and helmet.
St John's Church, Burslem grid reference SJ 8694 4950; 53°2′33″N 2°11′47″W		II	1717	The tower is 16th century. The rest of the church was rebuilt in 1717; the chancel, with apsidal east end and Palladian window, was added in 1788.
Christ Church, Cobridge grid reference SJ 8756 4870; 53°2′8″N 2°11′13″W		II	1839	Parish church built 1839–40, enlarged 1845. Designed by Francis Bedford.
Christ Church, Fenton grid reference SJ 8910 4450; 52°59′52″N 2°9′50″W		II	1890	The parish church, designed by Charles Lynam; built 1890–91, the tower in 1899.
Former Fountain Place Works, Burslem grid reference SJ 8670 4978; 53°2′43″N 2°11′59″W		II	1789	Frontage of former pottery factory, built by Enoch Wood in 1789. The former entrance is in a pedimented bay across the angle between flanking ranges.
Burslem School of Art grid reference SJ 8687 4971; 53°2′41.3″N 2°11′49.9″W		II	1905	Designed by Absalom Reade Wood. Built of brick with terracotta decorations.
St Joseph's Church, Burslem grid reference SJ 86589 49803; 53°2′43.188″N 2°12′5.339″W		II*	1927	Romanesque style Roman Catholic church, completed in 1927.
Bethel Chapel, Burslem grid reference SJ 8707 4957; 53°2′35.837″N 2°11′39.340″W		II	1824	Former Methodist church.
Hill Top Methodist Sunday School, Burslem grid reference SJ 8663 4988; 53°2′45″N 2°12′3″W		II	1836	The portico, with eight Doric columns, is all that survives of the original building.
Burslem United Reformed Church grid reference SJ 8700 4985; 53°02′44.99″N 2°11′42.82″W		II	1906	Designed by Absalom Reade Wood. Originally the Woodall Memorial Congregational Church, in honour of William Woodall, of whom there is a bronze relief on a decorated stone tablet on the front of the building.
The Duke William grid reference SJ 8672 4974; 53°2′41.2″N 2°11′57.7″W		II	1929	19th Century public house rebuilt in 1929 in the Brewers' Neo-Tudor style.
Longton Methodist Central Hall grid reference SJ 90886 43479; 52°59′18.85″N 2°8′13.99″W		II	1842	Built in 1842, with modifications in 1877 and 1933.
Burslem Market Hall grid reference SJ 8680 4975; 53°2′41.53″N 2°11′53.75″W		II	1879	Former market hall, built in 1879 and closed in 2003. It includes a frontage on Queen Street.
