= St John the Baptist's Church, Burslem =

Church of St John the Baptist, Burslem
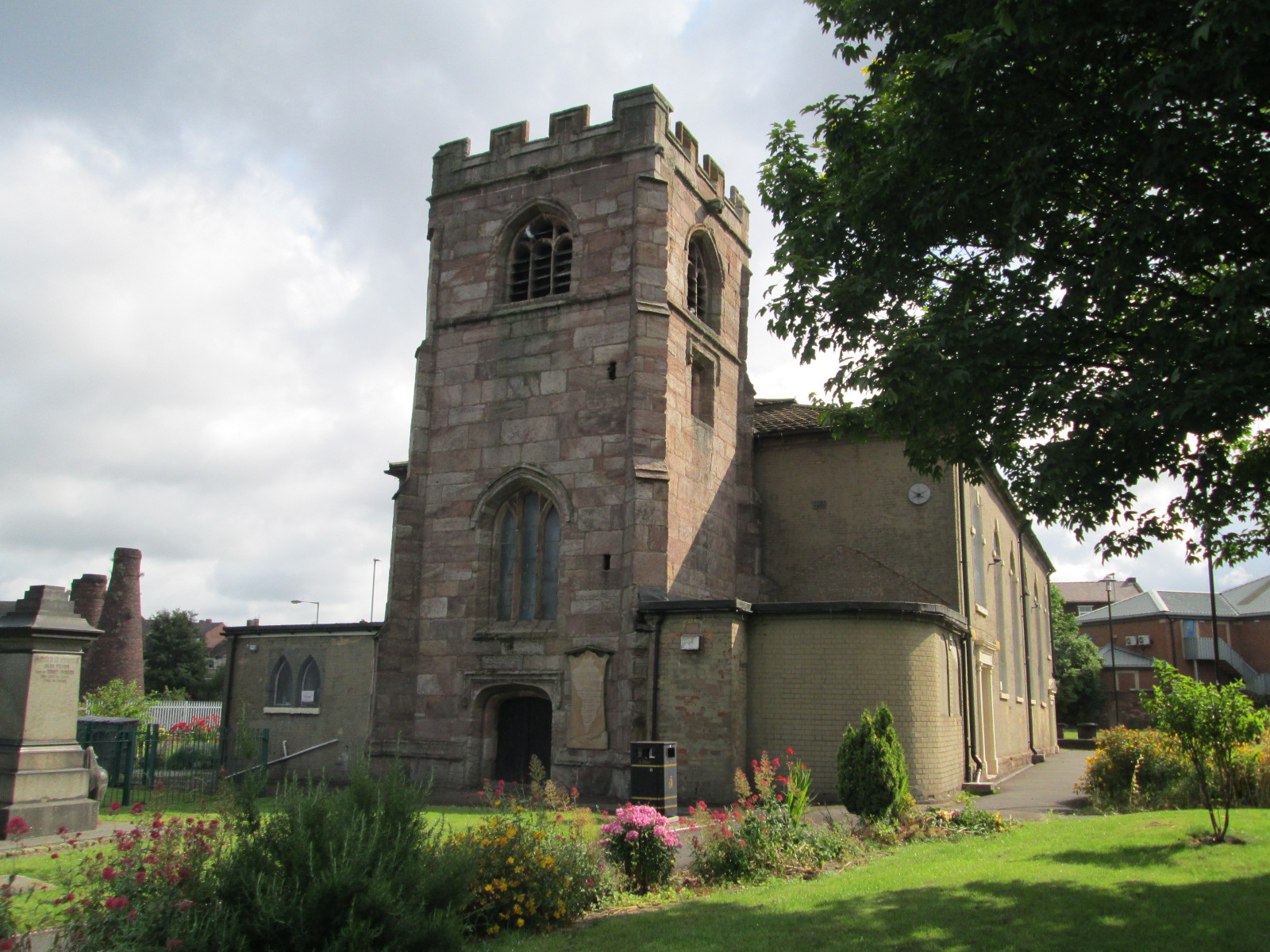
- Viewed from the west
- Church of St John the Baptist, Burslem
- 53°2′33″N 2°11′47″W
- OS grid reference: SJ 869 495
- Location: Burslem, Stoke-on-Trent
- Country: England
- Denomination: Church of England

History
- Dedication: Saint John the Baptist

Architecture
- Heritage designation: Grade II
- Designated: 2 October 1951

Administration
- Diocese: Diocese of Lichfield

St John the Baptist's Church is a 'community' church in Burslem, Stoke-on-Trent, Staffordshire, England. It is a Grade II listed building.

== History ==
Burslem became a parish in 1809; before that it was a chapelry in the parish of Stoke-upon-Trent, but often regarded as a parish, having its own churchwardens from 1553.

The stone tower of St John's was built in 1536. It is late perpendicular; the low west door has a Tudor arch.

The body of the church is of brick, built in 1717, replacing an earlier timber-framed building destroyed in a fire. The sides have tall windows with round arches. The chancel was added in 1788; it has an apsidal east end with a Venetian window. It is thought that Enoch Wood, the churchwarden, instigated the building of the chancel.

== Churchyard ==
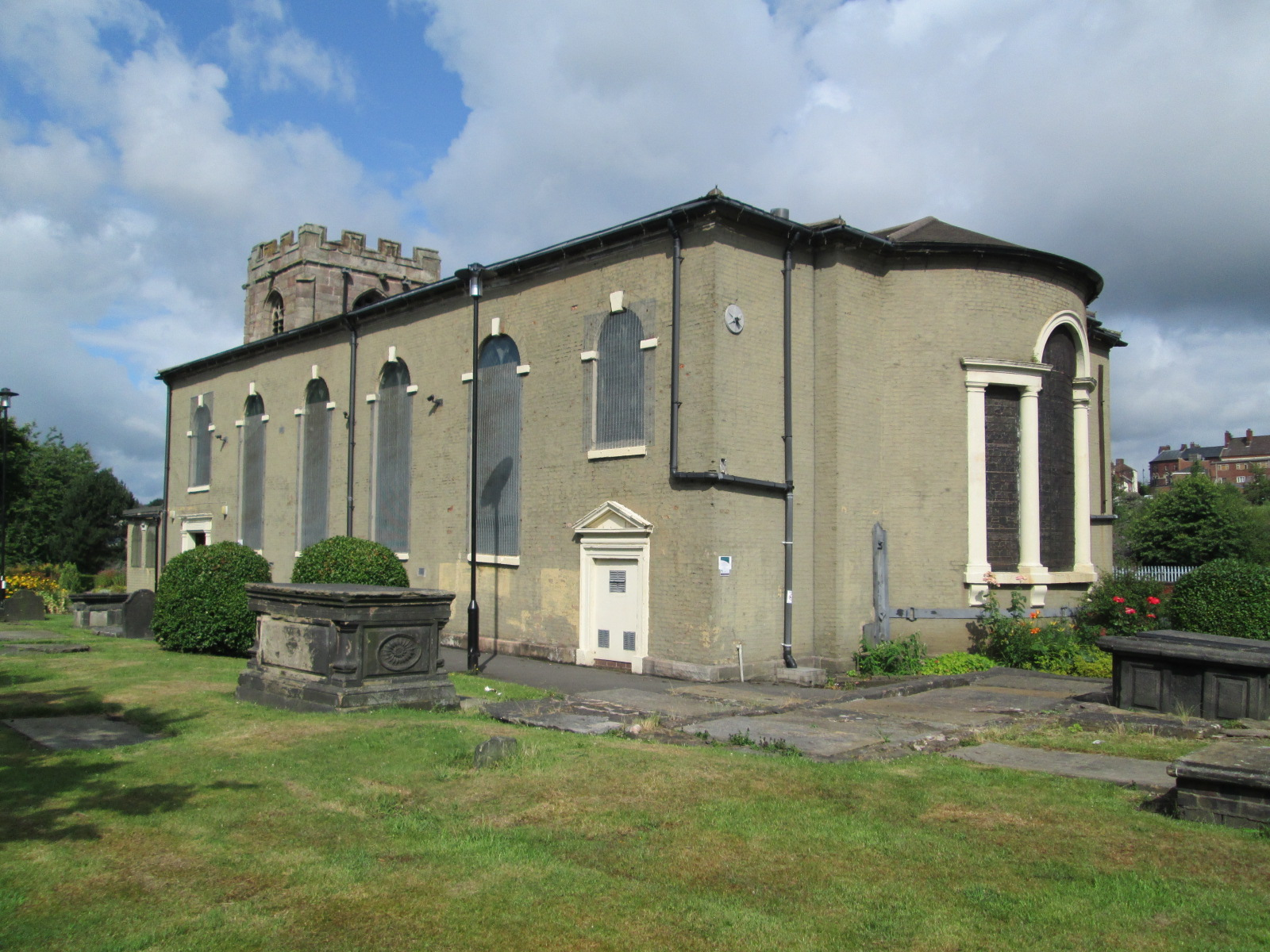
Viewed from the south-east

The churchyard was extended in 1804 and again in 1847; the older part has around it brick walls of the late 18th or early 19th century.

Among the graves in the churchyard are those of the potters William Adams (1746–1805) and Enoch Wood (1759–1840).

It also contains the grave of Margaret (or Mollie) Leigh (died 1748), who was reputed to be a witch. Her tomb has its axis set north–south. It is thought that it was re-orientated by the rector of St John's (who had earlier officiated at the funeral) in order to lay her ghost to rest, after a rumour that she had been seen after her death.

== See also ==
- Listed buildings in Stoke-on-Trent
