= Molly Leigh =

English woman accused of witchcraft

- Born: Margaret Leigh; 1685; Burslem
- Died: March 1748 (aged 62–63)

Margaret 'Molly' Leigh (1685–March 1748) was an English property owner in the Staffordshire town of Burslem who, in her will, left substantial sums to charity. She was also accused of witchcraft, and, after her death, her grave was disturbed following claims she was haunting the town.

== Life ==
Margaret Leigh was born in 1685 in a cottage at Jackfield on the edge of the moors at Burslem (now one of the towns of Stoke-on-Trent) in Staffordshire. She was reputedly a solitary character who made a living selling milk from her herd of cows to travellers and passers-by. Described as ugly - possibly disfigured through smallpox - and with a quick temper, she was an eccentric person who kept a pet blackbird or jackdaw. The bird often sat on her shoulder when she brought milk into Burslem to sell to the dairy.

Some Burslem people were suspicious of her. This was not surprising as, throughout the country, women, particularly ugly or elderly women, who lived on their own in remote places were often labelled as witches. In Leigh’s case it was the local parson, Rev. Thomas Spencer, rector of St John's Church, who made the accusation. He claimed that Leigh sent her blackbird to sit on the sign of the Turk’s Head pub that the parson frequented, and that the bird's presence was responsible for turning the beer sour. Leigh was also blamed for other ailments suffered by the townsfolk.

Leigh died in March 1748 and was buried on 1 April 1748 in the churchyard of St John's. After claims that her ghost haunted the town, it is said Spencer—along with clerics from Stoke, Wolstanton, and Newcastle-under-Lyme—exhumed her body, opened the coffin, and threw in the still-living blackbird that had been her companion. They then reburied Molly in a north to south direction, at a right angle to all the other graves in the churchyard.

=== Legacy ===
Leigh ran a successful business and in her will left substantial sums to relatives including her mother, Sarah Booth, who received the rent and profits from Jackfield. A friend, Alice Beech, who lived on land at Wall Flatt, owned by Leigh, witnessed the will, dated 21 March 1748, and was given Wall Flatt after Leigh died. Her will also included land at Newbold Astbury, near Congleton, and gold mourning rings for all her surviving relatives.

Leigh's will provided for 20 shillings to be paid to Alice Beech every year, and then to her descendents after her death. This cash would be used to buy bread to feed the "poor inhabitants and widows of Sneyd and Burslem.” After her mother, aunt and cousins died, Leigh instructed her executors, including Joseph Lovatt of Penkhull, that all her land and tenements – apart from Wall Flatt – should be sold and the profits used to build "a hospital in Burslem for the reception and habitation of ... poor women" and to provide food and clothing for these "poor women of the Parish". There is, however, no evidence that such a hospital was built.

Historians believe Leigh earned Spencer's enmity for refusing to contribute to the church's upkeep while he spent too much time drinking: "Molly was a very religious woman and she did support her church. She was, really, a decent person." Her association with Lovatt was said to "immediately destroy any possibility whatsoever of her being a 'witch' or of low standing in society".

== Mythology ==
There are stories that her ghost appeared to walk the streets of Burslem apologising for her sins. Further stories claim that her spirit was exorcised by a group of several priests and that while it was successful, some of them died in the process. Some claim that if one skips around her grave three times chanting the mantra "Molly Leigh, Molly Leigh, Chase me around the apple tree," her spirit will return.

== Popular culture ==
The 20th-century witch Sybil Leek claimed to be a descendant of Leigh's, and took to keeping a jackdaw, named Mr Hotfoot Jackson, around with her, as Leigh had done.

The story of Molly Leigh inspired a feature film, Molly Crows, by Flashgun Films, filmed in the Stoke area in 2012 and distributed through Distrify via Facebook in 2014. The film plot involves the spirit of Molly returning to wreak revenge upon the descendants of those who wronged her. It won Best Drama at Portobello Film Festival in 2013. Molly Crows is now available to watch in full on YouTube.

The story of Molly Leigh is featured in the finale of the Alton Towers' Dungeon attraction. The story is told to guests in a dark atmospheric room before inanimate objects begin to move and the guests encounter Molly herself.

Local Staffordshire band Mercia wrote a song about her story, entitled "Molly Leigh (As the Crow Flies)", released in 2021.

Country music artist Rob Wheeler wrote a song based on the story called “Hotfoot Jackson” released in 2022 on a Halloween themed EP.
