= Swan Bank Methodist Church, Burslem =

Swan Bank Methodist Church
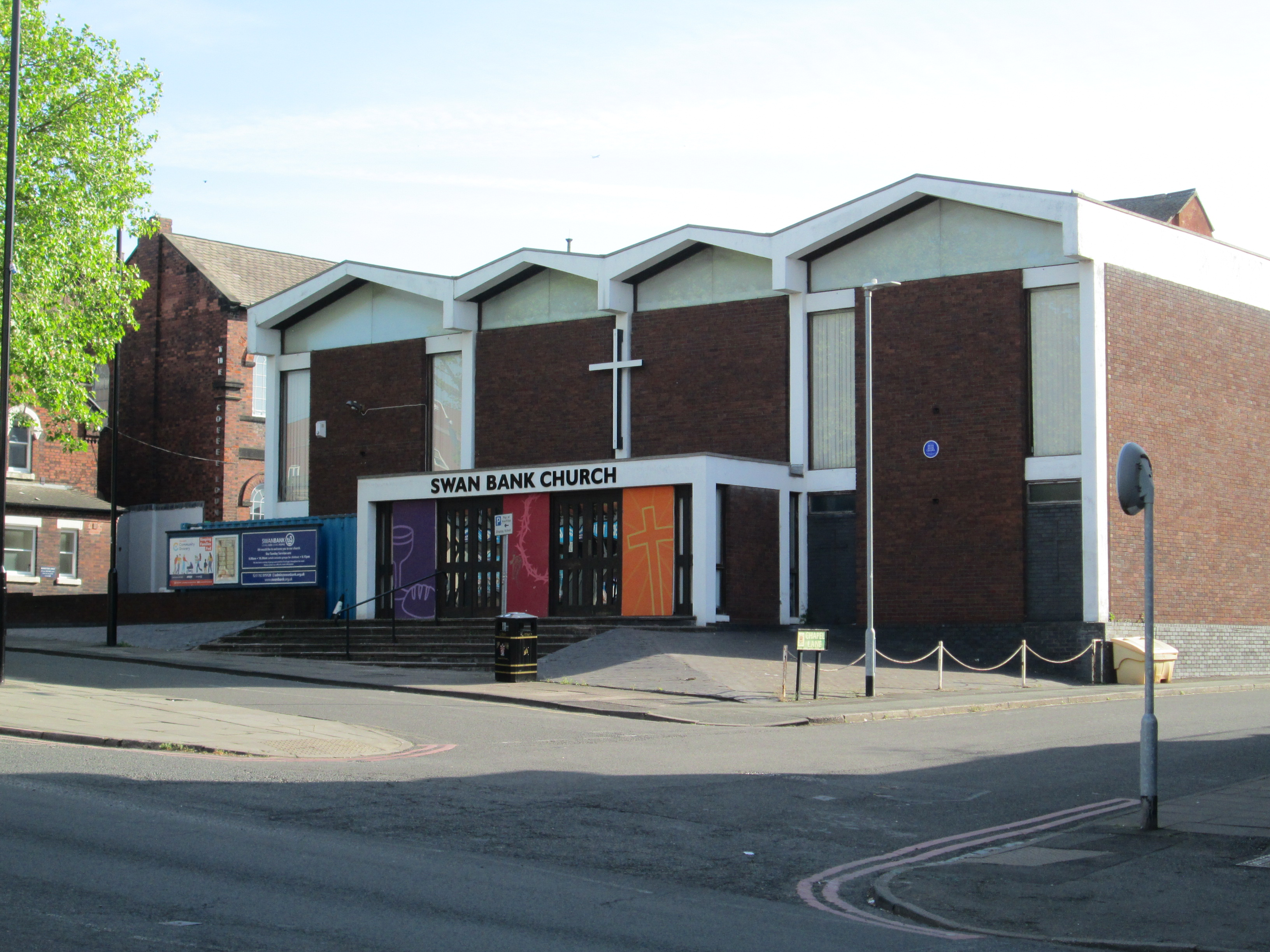
- Swan Bank Methodist Church
- 53°02′43.3″N 2°11′44.5″W
- OS grid reference: SJ 86975 49800
- Location: Burslem, Stoke-on-Trent
- Country: England
- Denomination: Methodist
- Website: www.swanbank.org.uk

Architecture
- Architect(s): Hulme Upright and Partners
- Completed: 1971

Swan Bank Methodist Church is a Methodist church in Swan Square, Burslem, in Stoke-on-Trent, Staffordshire, England. The present church, built in 1971, replaced the earlier building of 1801.

== History and description ==
The Society of Methodists in Burslem was established about 1740 by a group of miners who had heard John Wesley preaching in Bristol. Wesley visited Burslem in 1760, and one of the converts, John Lindop, opened his cottage for services. The first Methodist chapel was built in 1766. In 1783 Burslem was made head of a Methodist circuit. A brick building, Swan Bank Chapel in Swan Square, was erected in 1801, and enlarged in 1816.

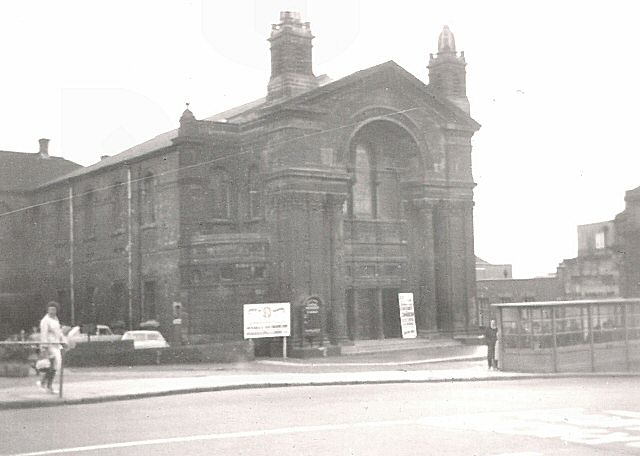
Swan Bank Chapel, built in 1801, demolished in the late 1960s

There was a dispute in 1836 between the teachers of Burslem Sunday School, where reading and writing was taught to children, and the trustees of the chapel, who disapproved of the teaching of non-religious knowledge on a Sunday. They formed themselves as "The Methodist Society", eventually building in Burslem the Hill Top Methodist Sunday School, housing school rooms and a chapel.

The school at Swan Bank was re-opened, under the management of the trustees, and Sunday School building were erected next to the chapel in 1851. The chapel in that year seated 1,290; average attendance was 500 in the morning and 800 in the evening. In 1870 a stone portico in Renaissance style was added to the building. The chapel in 1949 became known as the Central Methodist Church.

The church building was demolished in the late 1960s; the adjacent Sunday School buildings remained. The present church, designed by Hulme Upright and Partners, was built in 1971.
