= Christ Church, Fenton =

Christ Church
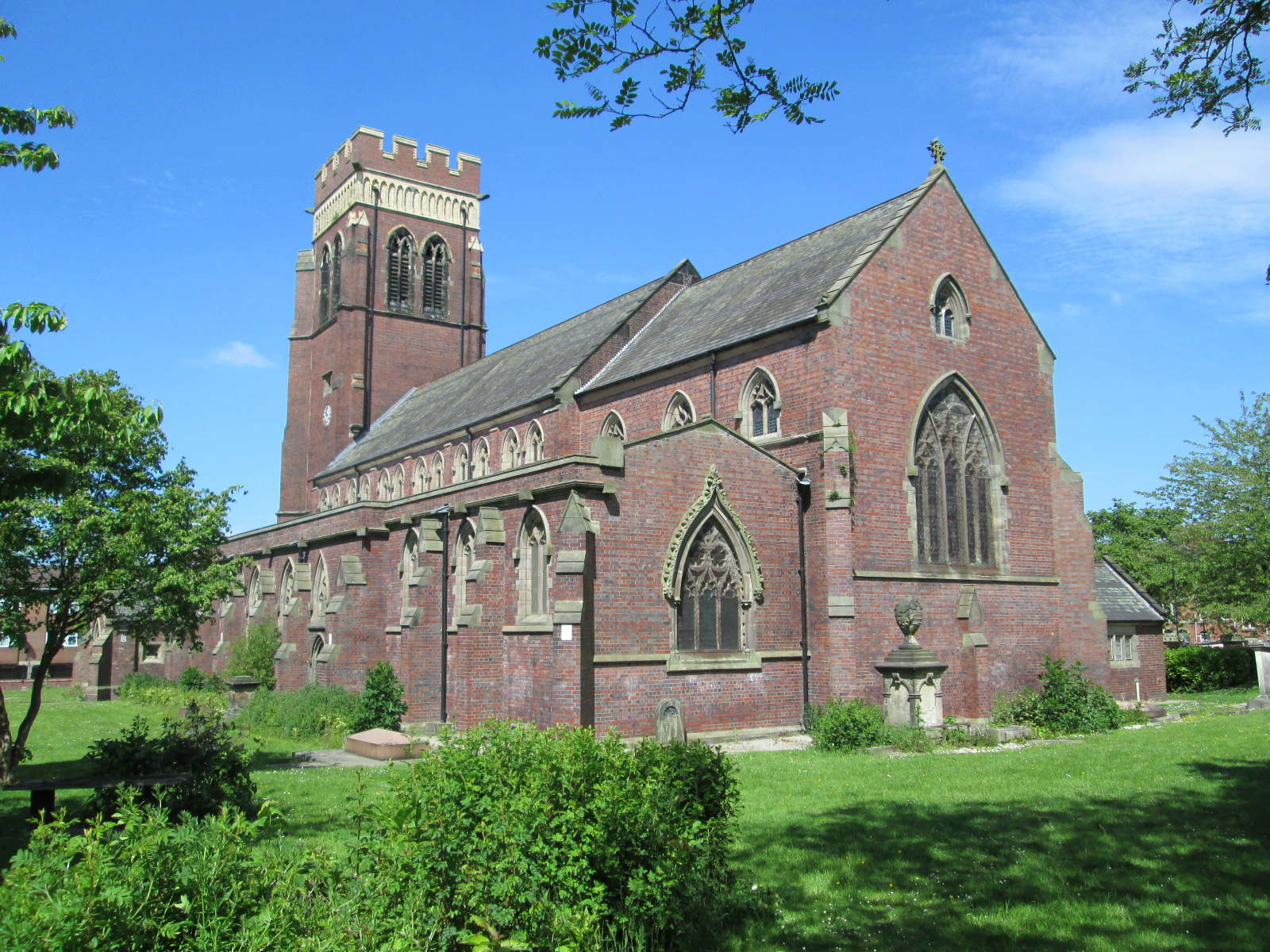
- Viewed from the south-east
- Christ Church
- 52°59′51.1″N 2°9′50.0″W
- OS grid reference: SJ 891 445
- Location: Fenton, Staffordshire
- Country: England
- Denomination: Church of England

Architecture
- Heritage designation: Grade II
- Designated: 7 March 1989
- Architect: Charles Lynam
- Completed: 1899

Administration
- Diocese: Diocese of Lichfield
- Parish: Stoke-upon-Trent and Fenton

Christ Church is an Anglican church in Fenton, Staffordshire, England. It is in the parish of Stoke-upon-Trent and Fenton, and in the Diocese of Lichfield. The building is Grade II listed.

== History and description ==
=== Background ===
During the early 19th century Fenton grew from being a collection of villages to having a more urban character. The Fenton area was in the parish of Stoke-upon-Trent until 1841, when a new parish was created: it covered the two townships of Fenton Culvert and Fenton Vivian, except for a part already in the new parish of Longton.

=== The former building ===
The original Christ Church in Fenton was built in 1838–1839. The architect was Henry Ward, who also designed the Town Hall of Stoke-upon-Trent. It was in Gothic style, built of brick with stone dressings, with a west tower. It had an unaisled nave of five bays, and seated about 1,000. It was later demolished and replaced by the present building.

=== The present building ===
The present church, designed by Charles Lynam, was built in 1890–1891; the west tower, with eight bells, was added in 1899. The church seats 1,900. It is in Gothic style, and built of red and blue brick with stone dressings. The nave, of six bays, has aisles and a clerestory; there is a south chapel and a north vestry. The tower has an embattled parapet, above an arcading of white bricks.

== See also ==
- Listed buildings in Stoke-on-Trent
