= Hill Top Methodist Sunday School, Burslem =

Hill Top Methodist Sunday School
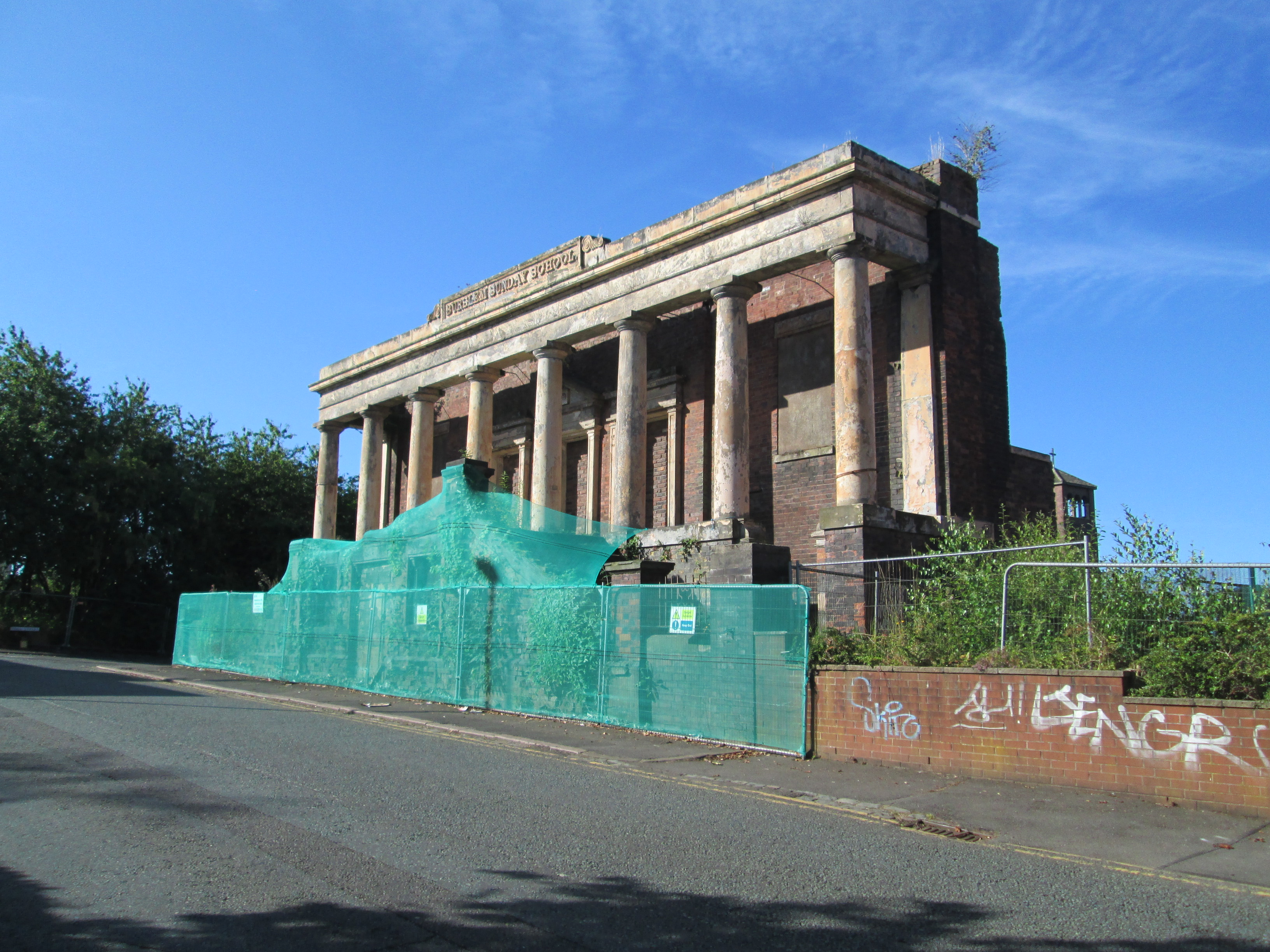
- Hill Top Methodist Sunday School
- 53°02′45.93″N 2°12′03.07″W
- OS grid reference: SJ 86632 49888
- Location: Burslem, Stoke-on-Trent
- Country: England
- Denomination: Wesleyan Methodist

Architecture
- Heritage designation: Grade II listed
- Designated: 19 April 1972
- Completed: 1837

Hill Top Methodist Sunday School was a Methodist church in Burslem, in Stoke-on-Trent, Staffordshire, England. The church, on the corner of Westport Road and Hall Street, was built in 1837. It was demolished in 1987, except for the entrance portico, which is Grade II listed.

== History and description ==
The church was built because of a dispute between the teachers of Burslem Sunday School, founded in 1787, where reading and writing was taught to children, and the trustees of the Wesleyan Chapel, at Swan Bank in Burslem, who disapproved of the teaching of non-religious knowledge on a Sunday. In May 1836 the teachers were locked out of the school. They formed themselves as "The Methodist Society", and continued their work in a pottery warehouse, and later in a wooden building which they erected in Moorland Road in Burslem.

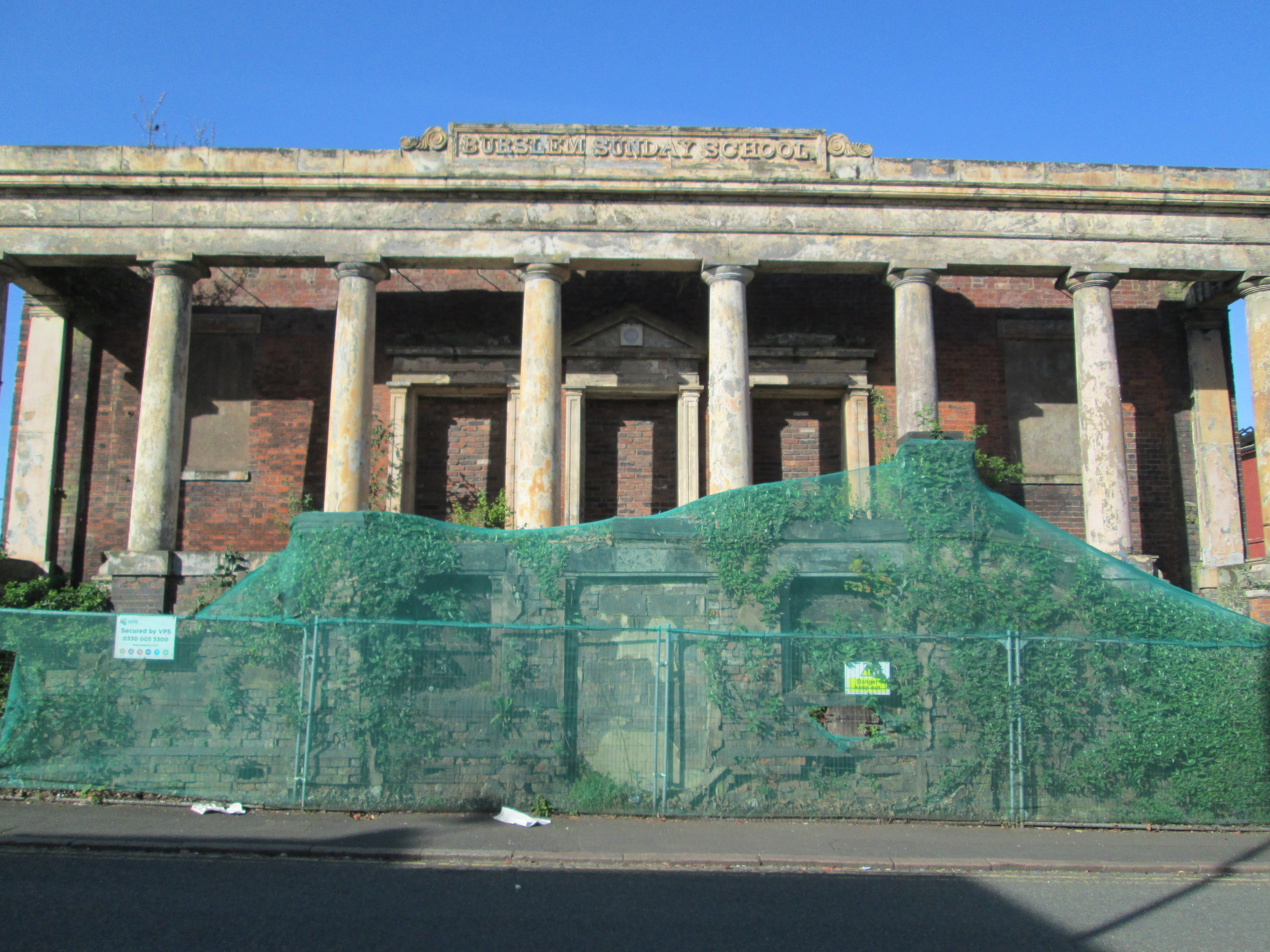

A permanent church was built in 1837. It was a three-storey brick building, with a stone portico raised above street level, leading to an entrance on the first floor where there was a chapel. The Sunday School rooms were in the floor below. There were 1354 scholars recorded in 1843. Services were conducted at first by the society's preachers; in 1848 the society joined the Wesleyan Methodist Association, whose ministers conducted the services. In 1878 the chapel seated 700.

The building was mentioned in the novels of Arnold Bennett, as "Sytch Chapel".

In the late 19th century, with the coming of state education, the Sunday School lost its importance. The chapel joined the United Methodist Church in 1907. In 1940 the chapel, extended in 1924, seated 900; there were three Sunday School halls in the building and 23 other rooms. When the Burslem Bethel Chapel closed in 1955, the Hill Top Chapel became head of the local Methodist circuit.

It closed as a place of worship in 1977. It was damaged by fire in 1983, and in 1987 the building was demolished, except for the portico. This consists of eight Doric columns standing above street level, with steps leading to them. The columns support an entablature, where in the centre "Burslem Sunday School" is inscribed.
