= Bethel Chapel, Burslem =

Methodist church in Staffordshire, England

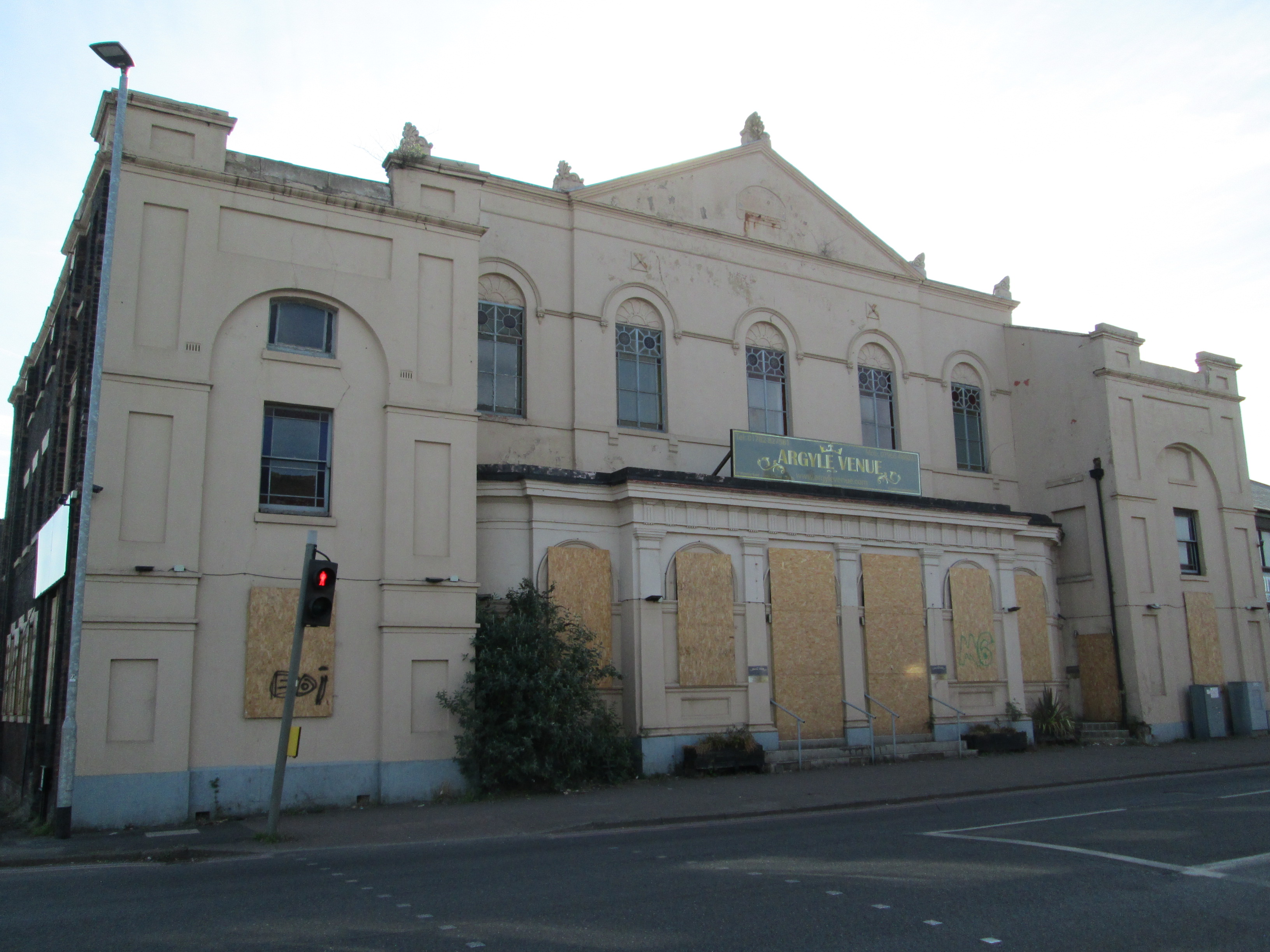
- The building in 2025
- Interactive map of the Bethel Chapel, Burslem area

General information
- Location: Burslem, Stoke-on-Trent, Staffordshire, England
- Coordinates: 53°2′35.837″N 2°11′39.340″W
- Completed: 1824
- Closed: 1955

Design and construction
- Designations

Listed Building – Grade II
- Designated: 19 April 1972
- Reference no.: 1365725

The Bethel Chapel in Burslem is a former Methodist church in Waterloo Road, in Stoke-on-Trent, Staffordshire, England. It was built in 1824 as a church of the Methodist New Connexion, and the church closed in 1955. It is a Grade II listed building.

== History ==
Soon after the formation of the Methodist New Connexion, the first meetings of the movement in Burslem were held by 1797 in the house of a Mr Rowley in Hot Lane. Job Ridgway (1759–1814), a potter and a founder member of the Methodist New Connexion in Hanley, where he had a factory, built in 1797 a church in Princes Row, Nile Street in Burslem, called Zoar Chapel. It was a brick building seating 500. It remained the property of the Ridgway family, and was later sold to the Congregational Church. Job's sons John and William Ridgway bought a site on Waterloo Road, which had recently been built, and erected the Bethel Chapel. It opened in 1824.

Projecting blocks were added in 1835 to the north (left) side, containing three school rooms, and south (right) side, containing the minister's accommodation. In 1851 it was governed by a new trust, making it independent of Bethesda Chapel in Hanley. The building was renovated in 1883 and 1904.

In 1940 it seated 650, and was head of the Burslem Bethel circuit. In 1955, because of a movement of population away from the town centre, the church closed; the Hill Top Chapel became head of the Burslem circuit.

== Description ==
It is built of brick with stucco dressing. The original building has five bays, the upper windows having semicircular heads. Above is a pediment with a tablet inscribed "Bethel Chapel 1824". Additional blocks to left and right were added later: these have stuccoed pilasters, and central windows in a tall arched recess.

== See also ==
- Burslem United Reformed Church
