= Charles Lynam =

English architect

Charles Lynam (9 February 1829 – 21 February 1921) was an English architect, designing many public buildings and churches in the Stoke-on-Trent area. He was also a church historian, archaeologist, and preservationist.

== Biography ==
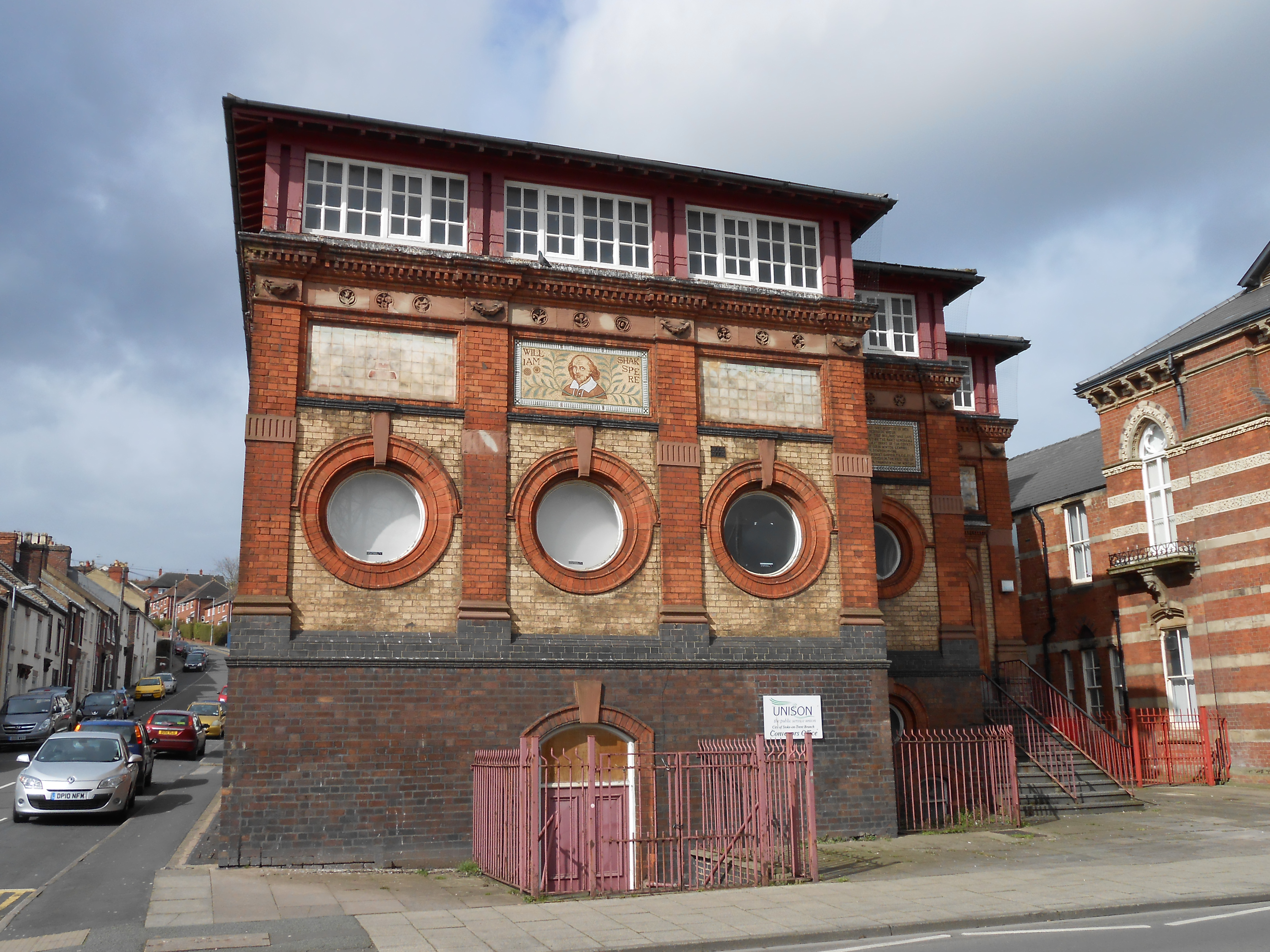
The Public Free Library, on London Road, Stoke-upon-Trent. Designed by Charles Lynam, built in 1878.

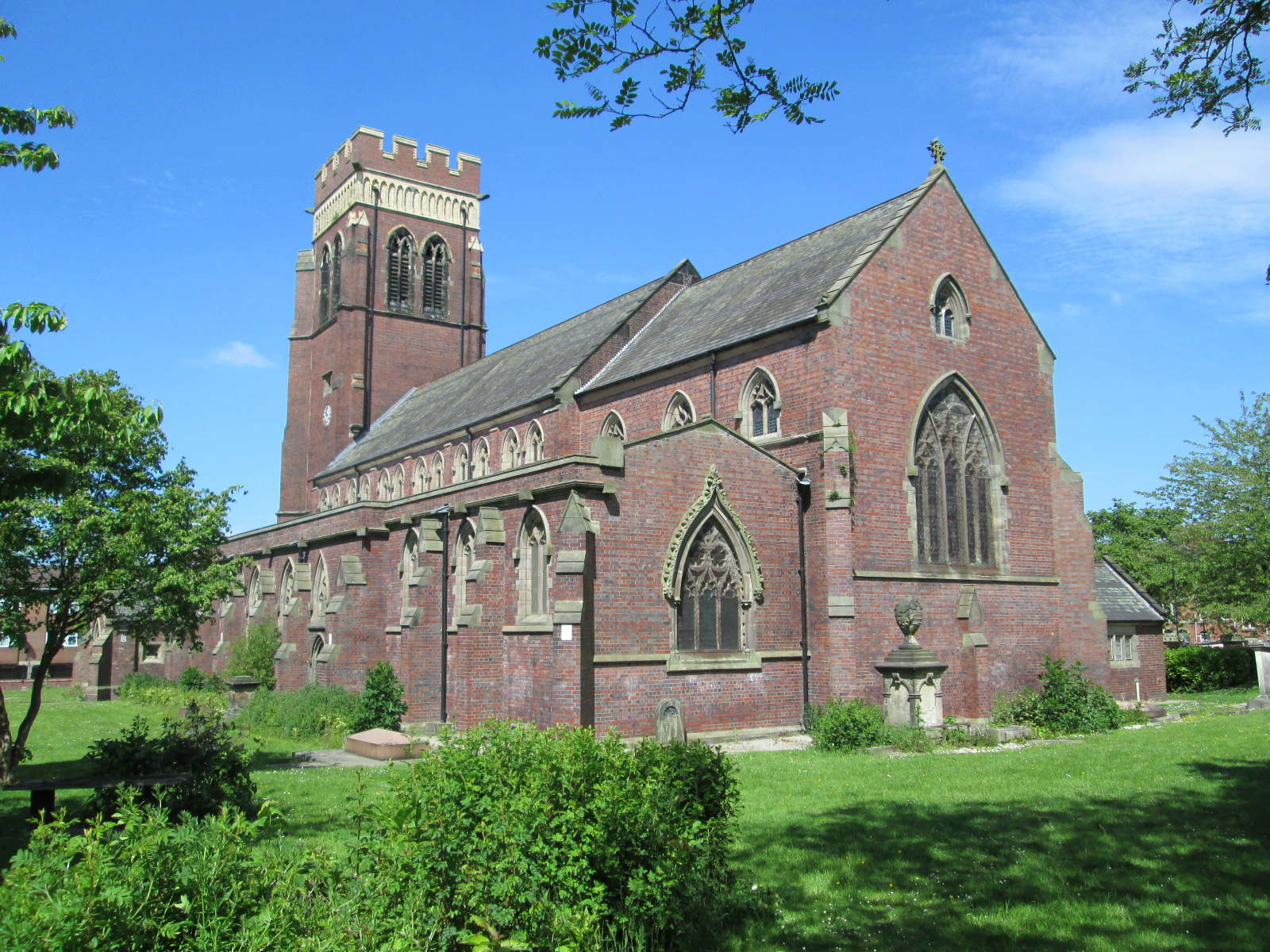
Christ Church, Fenton, designed by Charles Lynam, built 1890–91.

Lynam was born in Colwich, Staffordshire, son of George and Hannah Lynam, and was educated at Christ's Hospital School in London. After being articled with a London architect he joined his father's architectural practice in Stoke-upon-Trent, and in 1853 became a partner of the firm. His father died later that year.

An early project was The Villas, 24 houses built for the Stokeville Building Society in Stoke-upon-Trent, some of which are now listed buildings.

Lynam designed many public buildings in the Stoke-on-Trent area: these include the Public Free Library in Stoke-upon-Trent, and the North Staffordshire Royal Infirmary in Hartshill. He designed several churches in the area, including the Hartshill Cemetery chapels and Christ Church in Fenton, and restored many churches in Staffordshire and elsewhere. Among industrial buildings, he designed the Milton Hollins Tile Works in 1869 as well as those of three other tile making firms, Mintons Ltd in Stoke-upon-Trent and Craven Dunnill (1874) and Maw and Company (1883) in Jackfield, Shropshire.

In 1857 Lynam married Lucy (1834–1906), daughter of local historian Dr Robert Garner, author of The Natural History of Staffordshire. They lived at The Quarry in Hartshill, and had 14 children.

In 1882 he was elected a Fellow of the Royal Institute of British Architects, and in 1895 he brought their annual national Congress to Stoke.

In 1899 he published an exhaustive study and illustrated catalogue of the inscriptions on the ancient church bells of Staffordshire. This work also served to illustrate his preferred method of working - as the North Staffordshire Field Club noted of him in their obituary of 1921:

If, as was sometimes said, he worked rather in isolation, his results were freely divided [i.e.: were freely distributed and available to all who were interested].

In his old age he was elected Mayor of Stoke in 1903. Lynam died at Cliff Bank House in Stoke-on-Trent, on 21 February 1921, aged 92.

=== Archaeology ===
His early work was done in Staffordshire church history, much of which remained in manuscript, and for which he visited every church in the county to make recordings with brass rubbings and also notes of inscriptions that might be worn away by time.

From this early work he moved on to become an archaeologist, interpreting the ground plans of Croxden Abbey near Uttoxeter, and of Hulton Abbey near Stoke-on-Trent. His first published paper was on Croxden in 1868 and thereafter he continued to write for archaeological journals, and was elected a Fellow of the Society of Antiquaries of London in 1895.

In 1865 he joined the North Staffordshire Field Club; he wrote many articles for the club, and was elected their President in 1874 and 1894. The Club, in their annual Proceedings of 1892, also noted his tireless but more informal work in preventing damage to the remaining antiquities of the district:

his portrait ought to be painted with a drawn sword in his hand, keeping off the restoring vandals from our ancient camps and beautiful mediaeval architecture, all traces of which he so jealously guards.

"Camps" here meant the ancient earthworks such as Iron Age hillforts and Roman stations. His knowledge of these was encapsulated in his chapter on ancient "Earthworks", written for the Victoria History of the County of Stafford.

In 1894, he was awarded the club's Garner Medal "for his papers and memoirs on the Archeology of Staffordshire".

He also saw the usefulness of communicating with the public on such matters, and in 1921 the Field Club noted of him that:

Much of it [his archaeological writing] was only published in casual form in newspapers.

Even in his very old age, he continued to publish valuable new scholarly work in archaeology, such as his monograph Croxden Abbey (1911) which he produced when he was 82 years of age. At about this time he also supervised the ancient Roman excavations at Wall.
