= Burslem United Reformed Church =

Listed building in Stoke-on-Trent, England

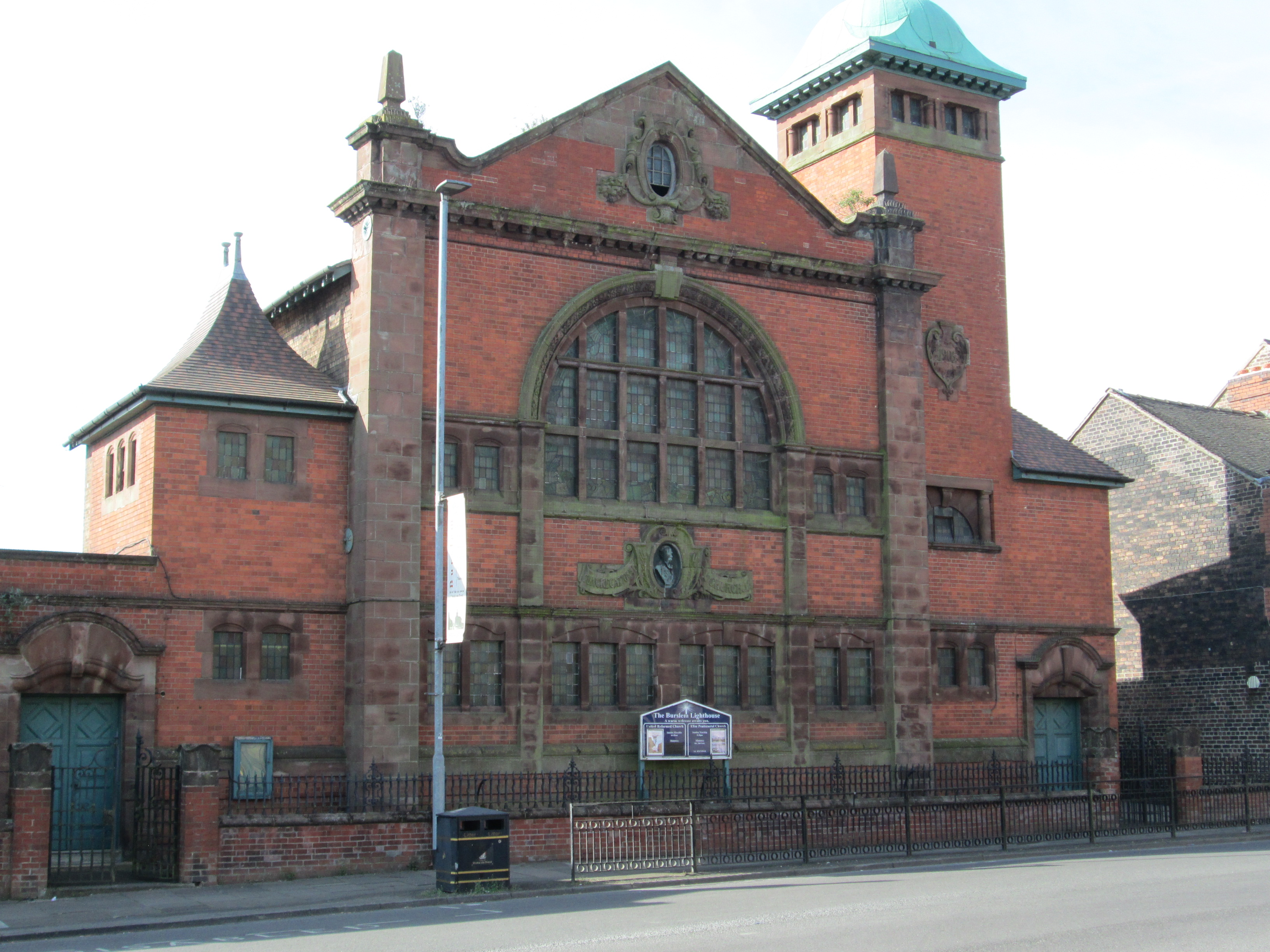
- Interactive map of the Burslem United Reformed Church area

General information
- Type: United Reformed Church
- Location: Burslem, Stoke-on-Trent, Staffordshire, England
- Coordinates: 53°02′44.99″N 2°11′42.82″W
- Completed: 1906

Design and construction
- Architect: Absalom Reade Wood
- Designations

Listed Building – Grade II
- Official name: Burslem United Reformed Church (formerly Woodall Memorial Congregational Church)
- Designated: 13 December 2010
- Reference no.: 1396377

Website
- urcnorthstaffs.org.uk/who/burslemurc

The United Reformed Church is a church on Moorland Road in Burslem, Stoke-on-Trent, Staffordshire, England. It is a Grade II listed building, completed in 1906. It was originally a Congregational church.

== History ==
The first Congregational meetings in Burslem were in about 1819, in the house of a Mr Bailey. In 1825 they leased Zoar Chapel, in Princes Row, Nile Street, built for the Methodist New Connexion in 1798, and they purchased it in 1828. It was used until 1838, when Queen Street Church was opened, a brick building seating 400.

It was replaced by the present building, erected in 1905 to 1906 and seating 550. It was designed by Absalom Reade Wood (1851–1922). He had an architect's practice in Tunstall, and designed buildings in the town including Tunstall Town Hall and the Queen Victoria Jubilee Buildings (a public library and baths). He also designed Burslem School of Art. The church was originally called the Woodall Memorial Congregational Church, after William Woodall (1832–1901), a Congregationalist, local M.P. and leader of the women's suffrage group in the House of Commons. He had encouraged the building of a Congregational church in the town.

== Description ==
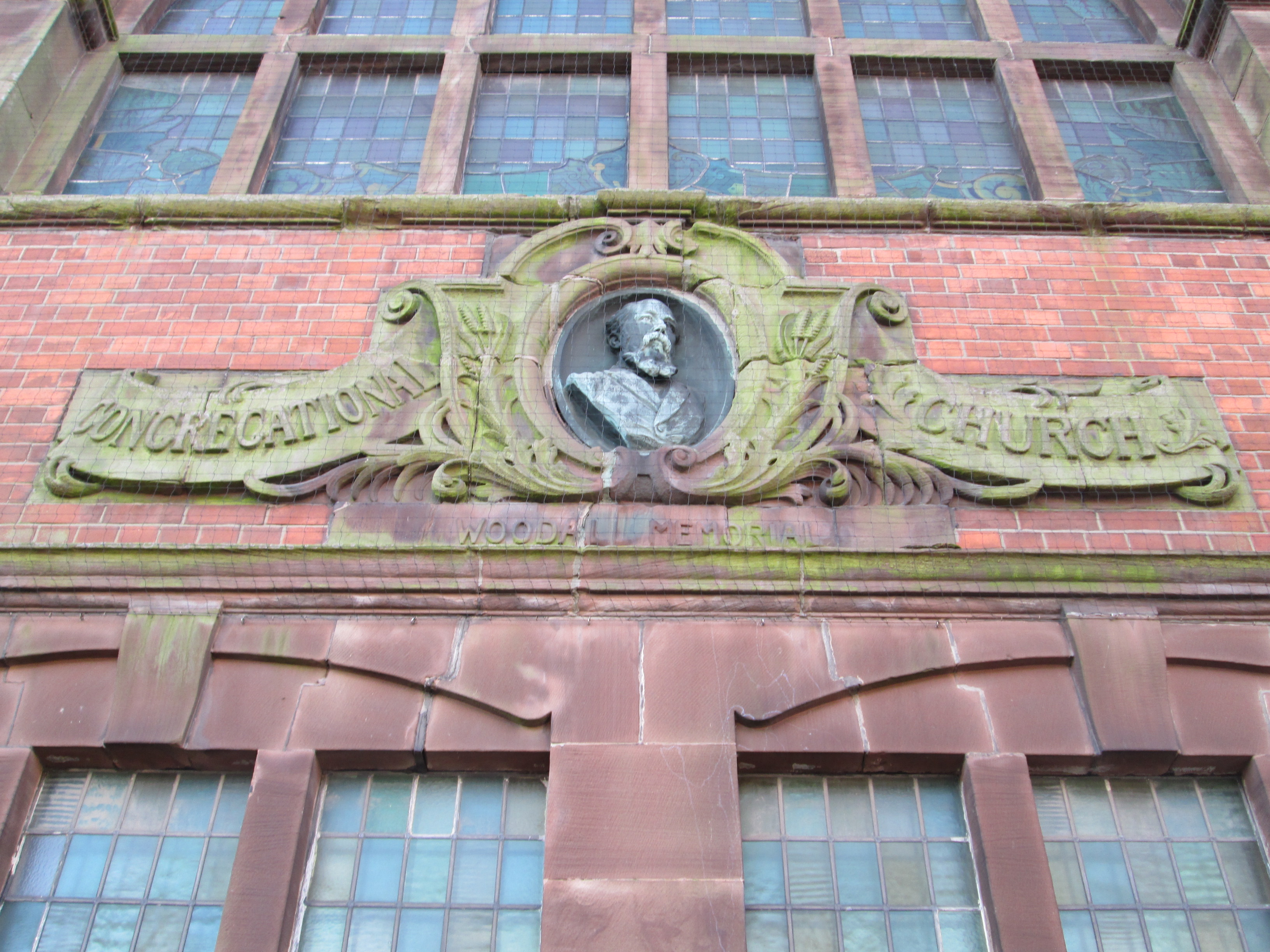
The stone tablet with a bronze relief of William Woodall

The front facing the road is of red brick and sandstone: there are square stone columns with stone finials, and between them is a large central window, with a Romanesque round arch, and smaller windows either side. To the right there is a four-storey bell tower, which has a copper-domed roof and a finial.

Below the central window there is a decorated stone tablet, inscribed "Woodall Memorial Congregational Church", bearing a bronze relief of William Woodall by Stanley Thorogood (1873–1953), an artist, potter and teacher of art.

Inside, the congregation space has a raised stage to the south, where there is oak choir seating and oak panelling. At the north end is a gallery. There is a barrel-vaulted ceiling.

== Present day ==
The church is now known as the Burslem Lighthouse. Since 2006 there has been a church partnership of the United Reformed Church with Burslem Elim Pentecostal Church.

== See also ==
- Bethel Chapel, Burslem
