= The Villas =

Housing estate in Stoke-upon-Trent, Staffordshire, England

Coordinates: 52.9971°N 2.1921°W

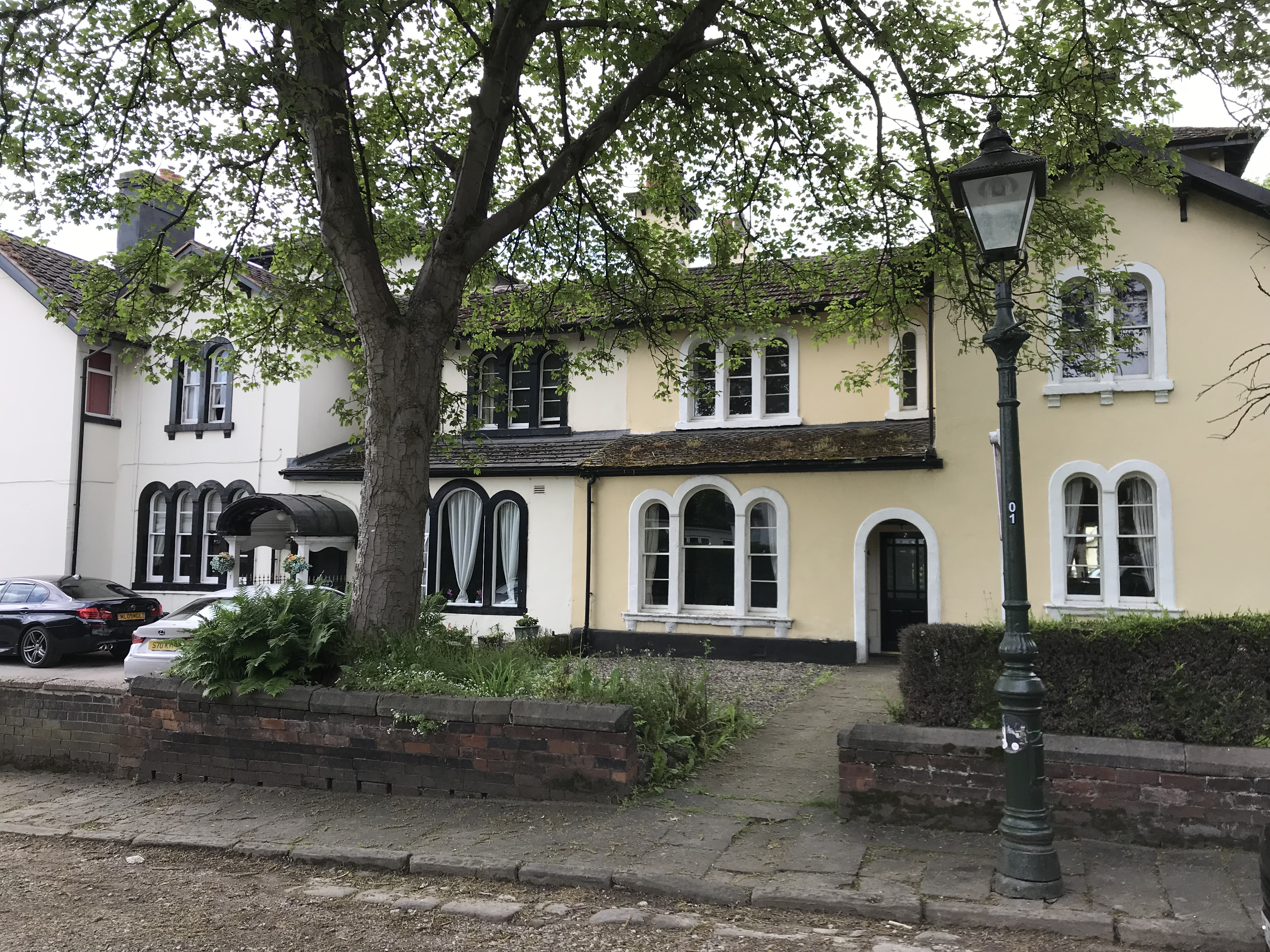
Nos. 1 & 2 The Villas

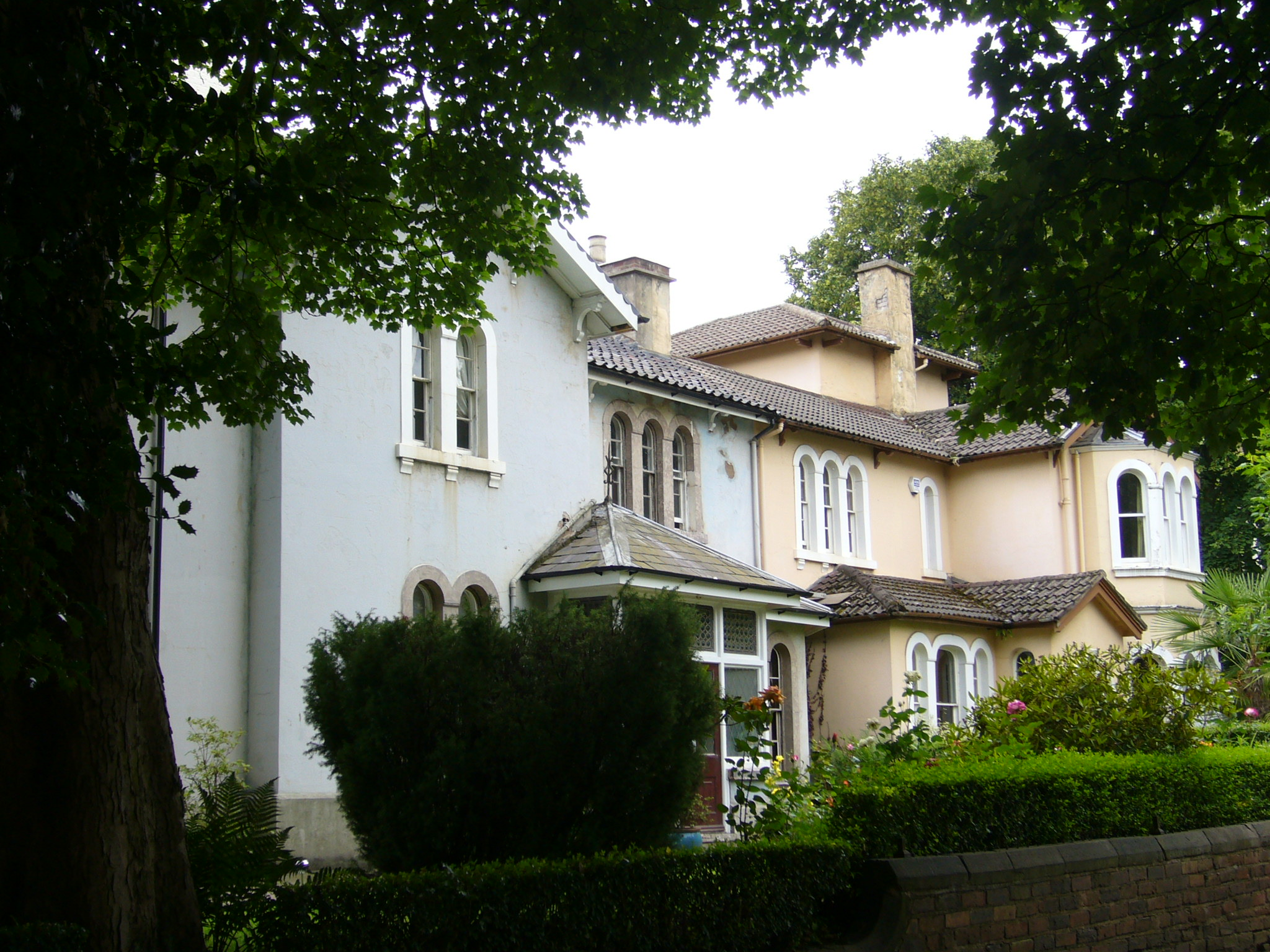
Nos. 3 & 4 The Villas

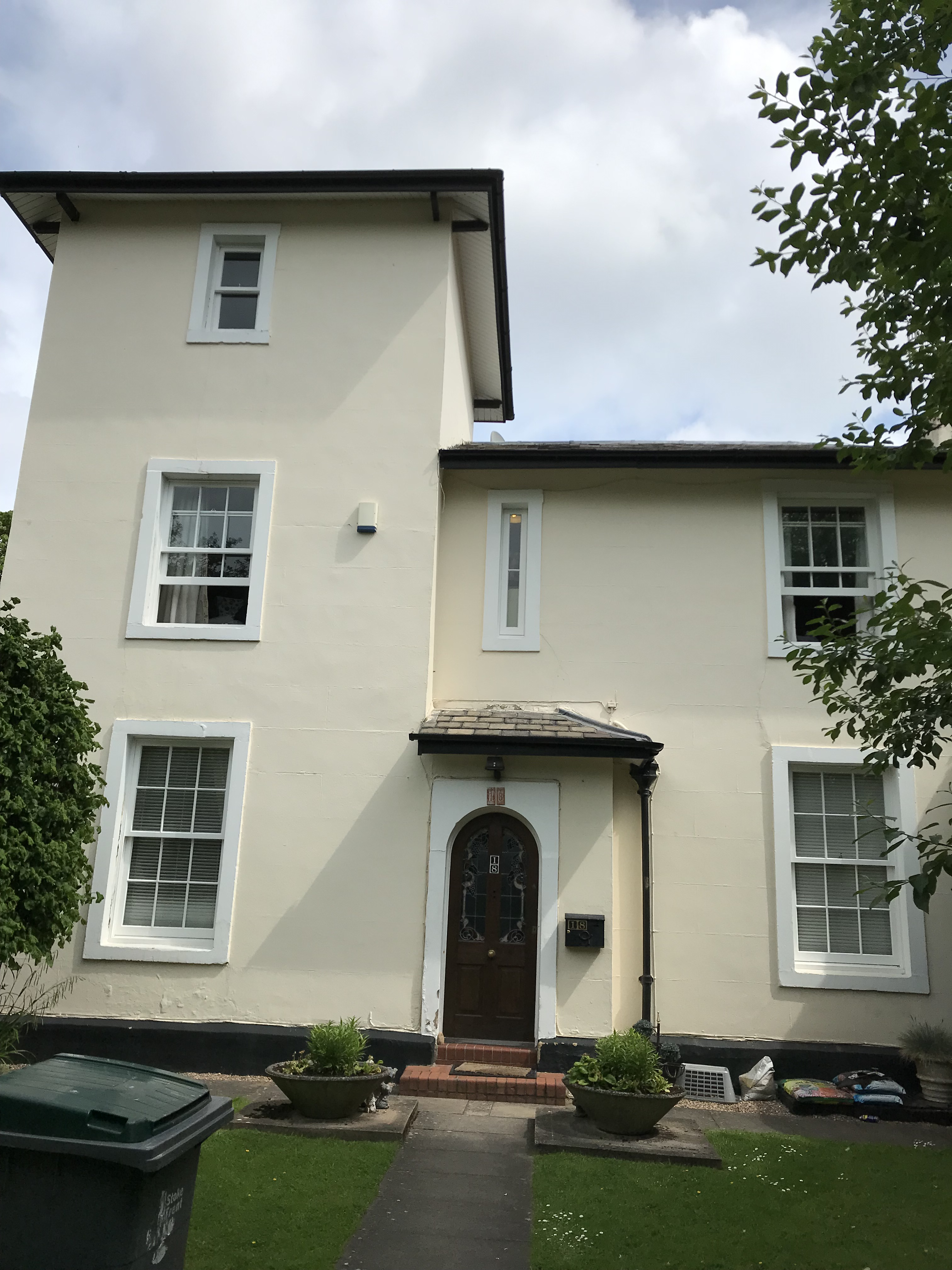
18 The Villas

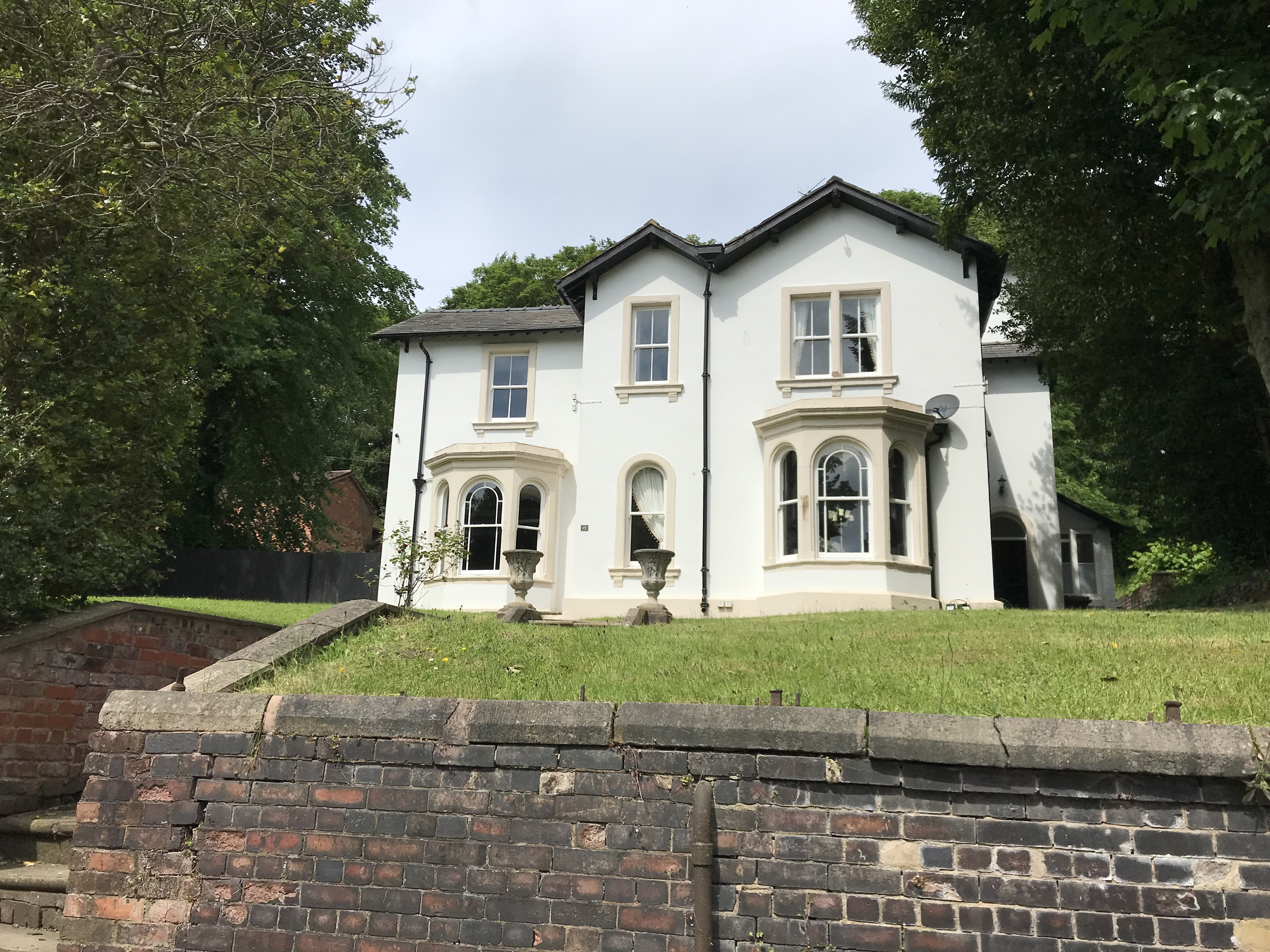
15 The Villas

The Villas, Stoke-on-Trent, is an estate of 24 Victorian houses in Stoke-upon-Trent, England. Originally a distinct settlement set in green fields, it now merges with the late 19th- and early 20th-century suburban sprawl along London Road below Penkhull village on the outskirts of Stoke-on-Trent and within the ward of Stoke and Trent Vale.

Most dating from 1851 to 1855, The Villas was designed by local architect Charles Lynam, who became a prominent architect in Staffordshire, building the Minton Hollins tileworks, for example. In designing The Villas, he chose an Italianate style similar to other Staffordshire buildings, such as Trentham Hall and Alton Towers railway station.

In June 1850, a number of prominent inhabitants of Stoke formed "The Stokeville Building Society". The purpose of the building society was to provide the means and the financial capability for its members to erect, and ultimately own, houses on copyhold land outside the town of Stoke-upon-Trent. The land, 'Big Meadow and Barker's Meadow', containing seven acres, two rods and 18 perches, belonged to the Reverend Thomas Minton, brother of Herbert Minton, and son of the founder of Thomas Minton and Sons (later Mintons Ltd), pottery manufacturer of Stoke, and was finally purchased for £1,582 on 3 May 1859.

== Conservation ==
Originally built in three distinct classes, all providing accommodation for servants to “live in”, changing times meant that many were subdivided by the 1940s.

In 1956, a resident of number 15 The Villas, Arnold Machin, received publicity in the national press when he chained himself to the old metal lamp-post on the turning circle in protest at its planned removal.

Machin's protest, "against the destruction of all the beautiful things which is going on in this country." did not prevent the lamp-post from being replaced by a concrete one; however, it was given to him for his own garden and his wife Patricia unlocked him. A similar lamp has since been restored to the position of the original one.

The estate subsequently received the distinction, on 19 April 1972, of being the first designated conservation area in Stoke-on-Trent. Some of the houses also receive individual protection as listed buildings. Initially, a couple of the houses were listed, but more houses were listed on 15 March 1993, and The Villas now contains the highest concentration of Grade II listed buildings in the city.

The roadway which leads from London Road to The Villas is unadopted, and it remains unmetalled. Stoke-on-Trent City Council have stated that the ownership of the road is unclear, and have described the pavements as being "in an appalling state of repair".

== The Villas Vampire Case ==
The area gained national attention in January 1973, when Polish immigrant Demetrious Myicuria was found dead in his bed. Apparently terrified of a vampire attack, Myicuria had strewn his room with salt and garlic in ritual fashion. A post-mortem examination showed he had choked to death on a pickled onion, although PC John Pye believed it to have actually been a clove of garlic.
