= Longton Methodist Central Hall =

Methodist Central Hall
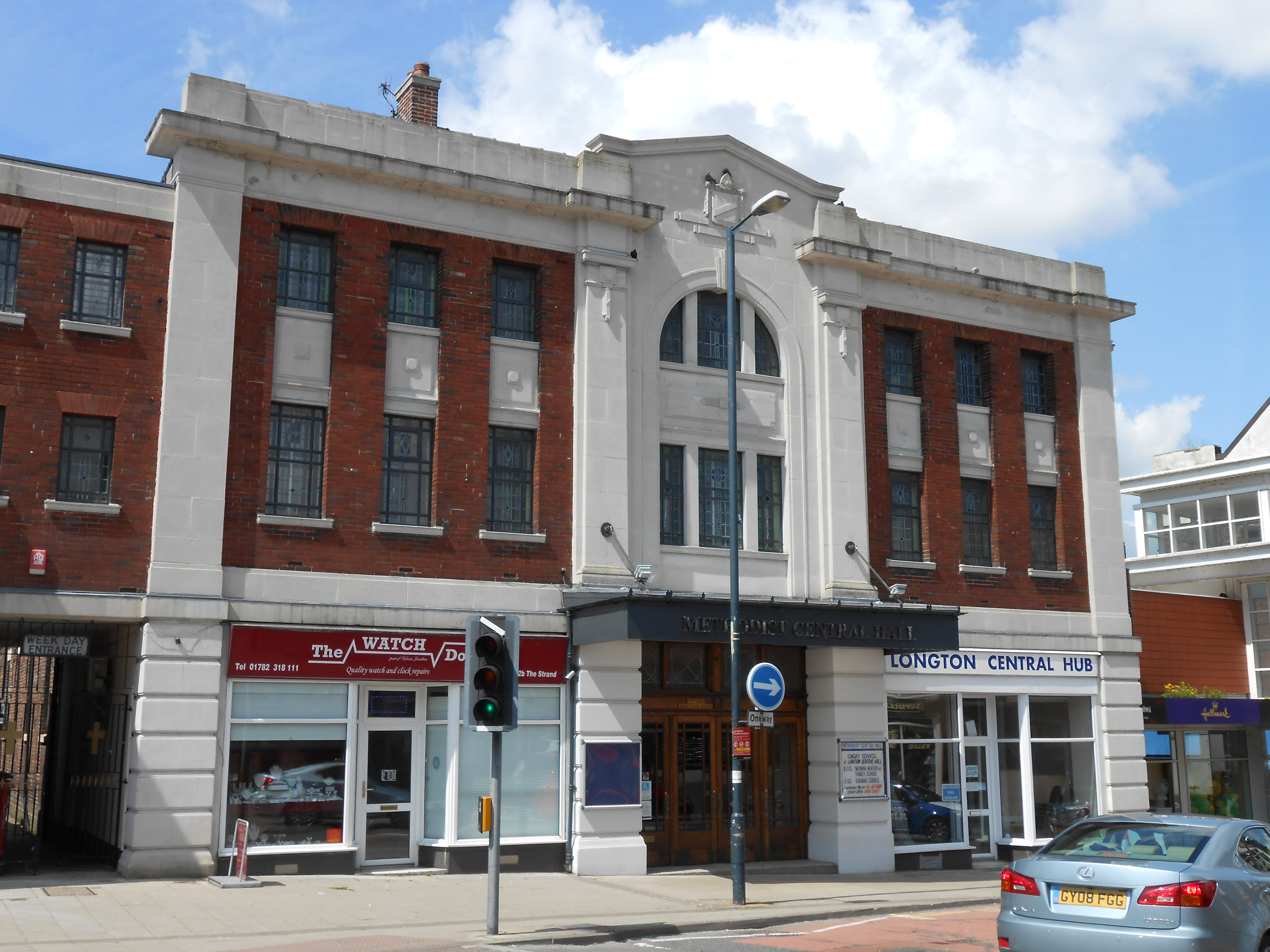
- Methodist Central Hall
- 52°59′18.85″N 2°8′13.99″W
- OS grid reference: SJ 90886 43479
- Location: Longton, Staffordshire
- Country: England
- Denomination: Methodist
- Website: potteriesmission.co.uk/chuches/longton-central-hall/

Architecture
- Heritage designation: Grade II
- Designated: 15 November 2021

Methodist Central Hall is a Methodist church building in Longton, Staffordshire, England. The building, dating from 1842 with later modification, is Grade II listed.

== History and description ==
The first Methodist building in Longton was erected in 1783. John Wesley first preached in Longton in 1784, in the open air since the meeting house was too small. A Methodist chapel was later built in Chapel Street in 1804.

The present building was erected in The Strand, at that time Stafford Street, in 1842, when the earlier building was insufficient for the size of the congregation. It was built in Greek Revival style; there was a portico with Doric columns, and it seated 500.

There were modifications to the interior, including ornamentaion of the pillars and ceiling, in 1877.

There were modifications in 1933, including a new façade in neo-Georgian style, with a central bay faced in stone; it was re-opened as the first Central Hall in the Stoke and Macclesfield District.

=== Interior ===
There is a lobby, divided from the main hall by a wide timber screen containing two pairs of double doors. There are stairs on either side leading to the gallery and upper floors.

The hall is a large space; fluted cast iron columns support on three sides a gallery with raked seating. At the west end there is a rostrum, the organ and raked choir seating. There is a coffered ceiling and a clerestory lantern, supported by columns having Corinthian capitals.

=== Heritage at Risk ===
It was given listed status, Grade II, in November 2021. In November 2023 it was added to Historic England's Heritage at Risk Register.
