= Enoch Wood =

English potter and businessman (1759–1840)

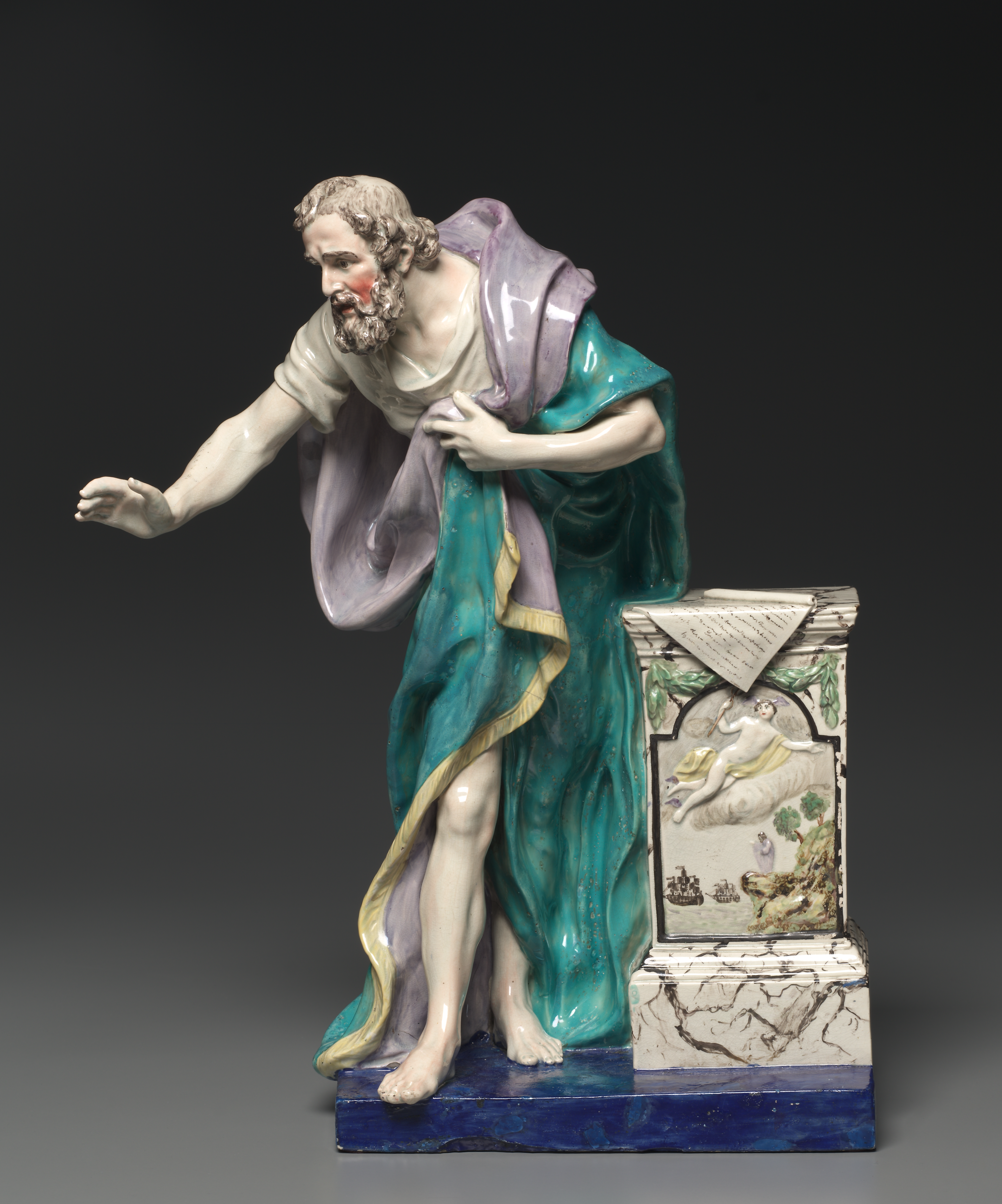
Demosthenes, Staffordshire figure modelled by Wood, c. 1800, over 18 inches tall (47.5 cm)

Enoch Wood (1759–1840) was an English potter and businessman, from one of the major families in Staffordshire pottery. Starting as a modeller, he established a successful business in Burslem in the Staffordshire Potteries, from 1790-1818 trading as Wood and Caldwell. In the 18th century they produced many Staffordshire figures, which Wood modelled himself, and other types of earthenware and stoneware. After 1818 his company, now Enoch Wood & Sons, produced large quantities of blue and white transfer-printed tableware in earthenware, much of which was exported to America.

== Life ==
He was born in 1759; his father Aaron Wood (1717–1785) was a highly regarded pottery modeller (mould maker), and his uncle Ralph Wood I (1715–1772), also a potter, became famous for producing well-modelled figures. Enoch Wood studied drawing and anatomy with his relatives the Caddick family in Liverpool, and was apprenticed to Humphrey Palmer, an earthenware manufacturer in Hanley. He became a skillful pottery modeller.

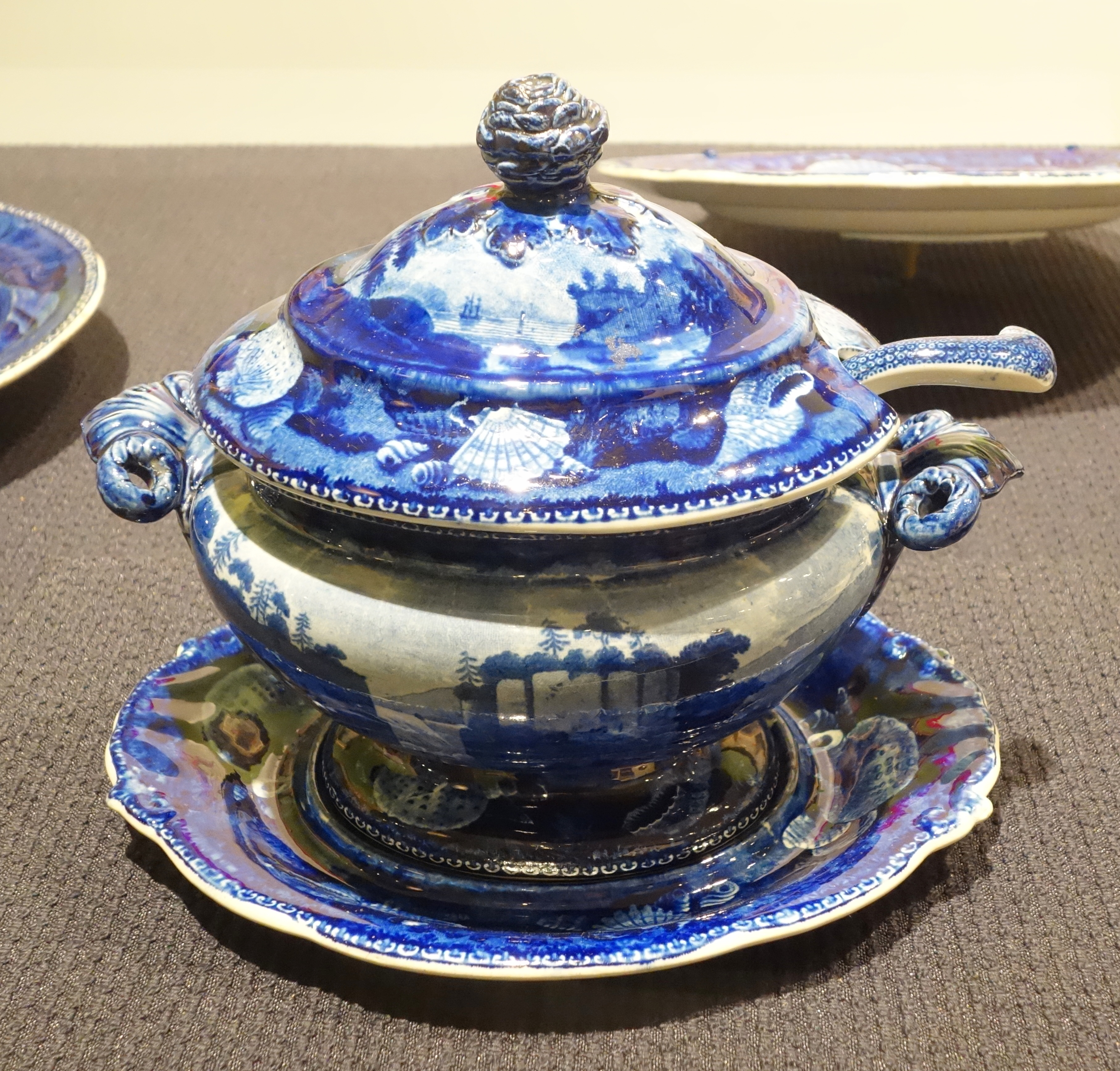
Sauceboat by Enoch Wood & Sons, c. 1840, showing a pass in the Catskill Mountains. In Brooklyn Museum.

He began a business in Burslem in 1783 with his cousin Ralph Wood II, as an earthenware manufacturer; the two were the leading pottery modellers of the period. In 1790 he went into partnership with James Caldwell (1759-1838), a local lawyer, as Wood and Caldwell, and a new factory was built at Fountain Place in Burslem, which produced a wide range of earthenwares. The company also had mining interests: the Bycars Colliery in Burslem provided fuel for the factory. The partnership was successful, and continued until 1818, when Wood bought out Caldwell and Wood's three sons became partners, the firm becoming Enoch Wood & Sons.

The new company produced a large quantity of blue transfer-printed earthenware, like other large potteries largely abandoning the figure market. A substantial amount of the wares were exported to America, where trade in earthenware increased after the end in 1815 of the Anglo-American war; Wood designed a range of items particularly for America.

Enoch Wood died in 1840, and the business closed in 1845; finances were affected by a loss of trade with America, and by his children claiming their legacies.

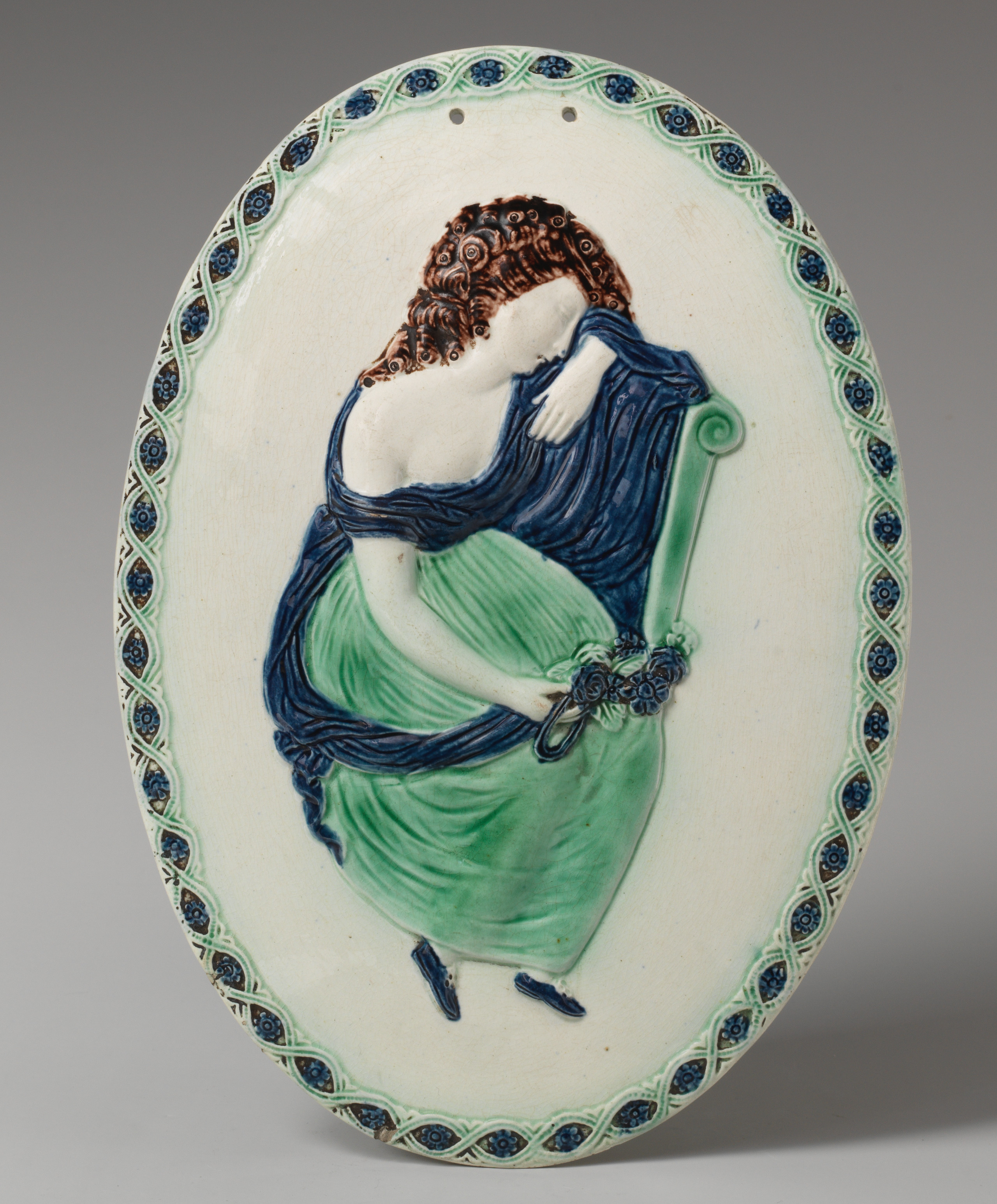
Plaque, before 1800, 21.9 cm

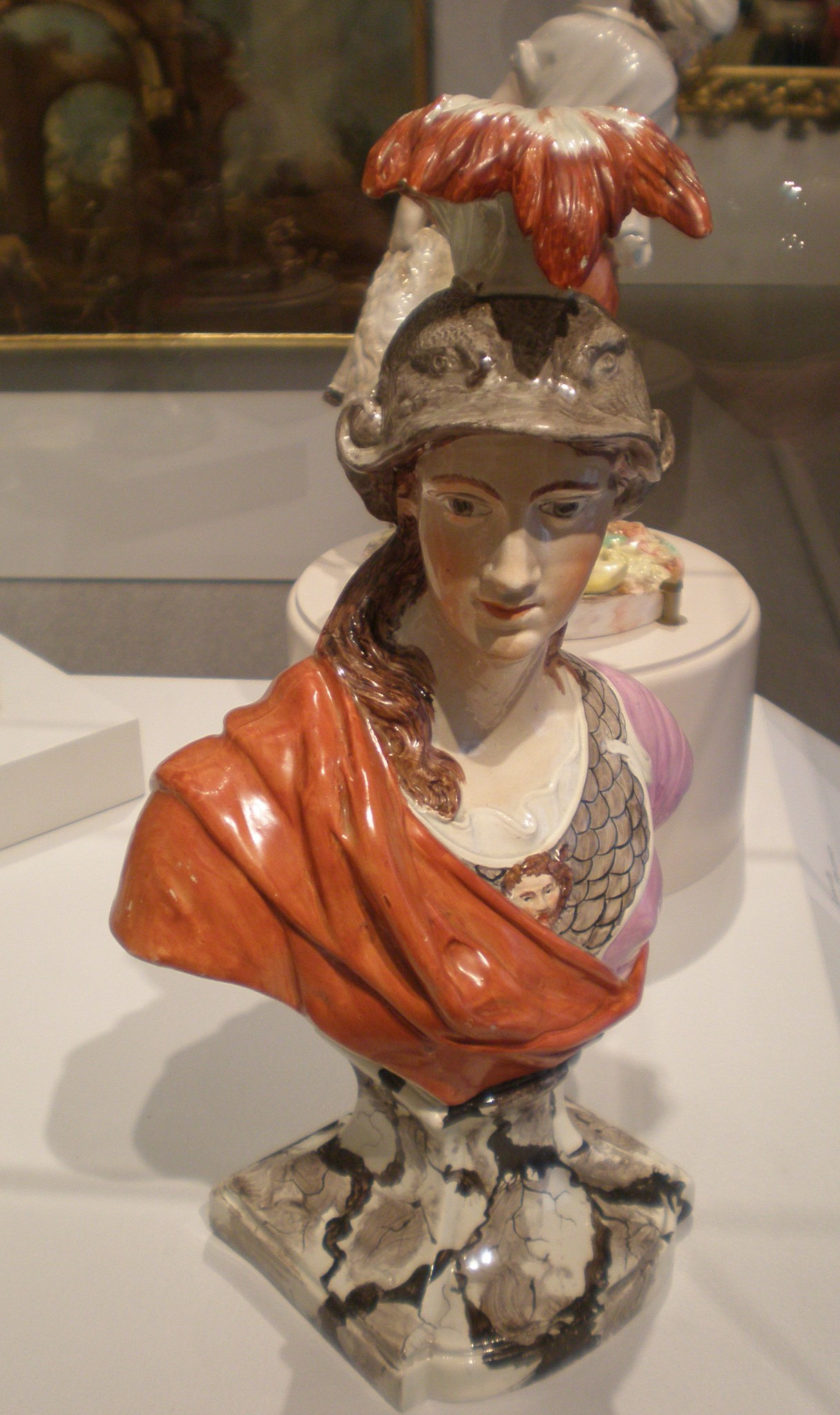
Bust of Minerva, c. 1790

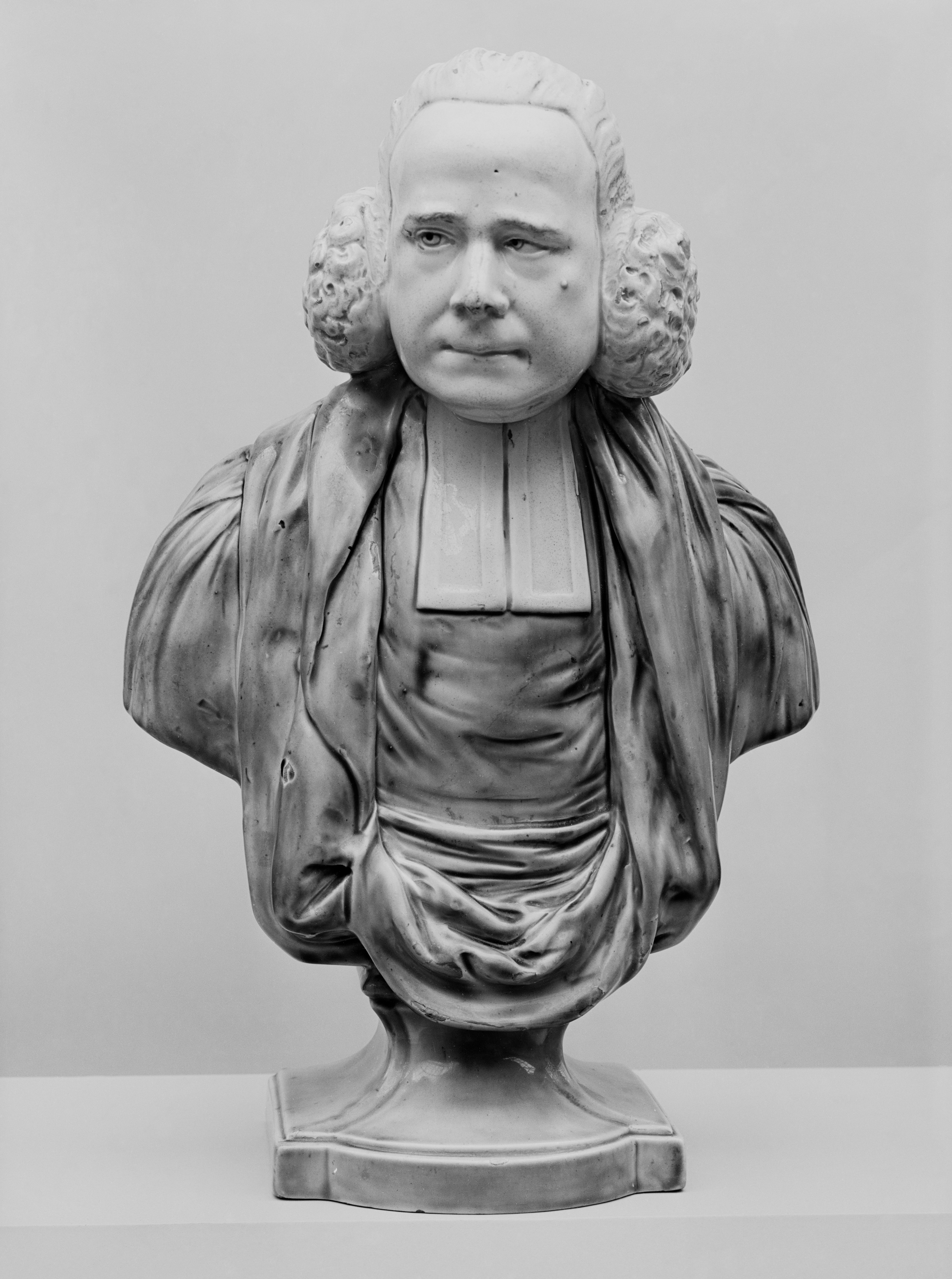
Bust of the Methodist preacher George Whitefield (d. 1770), c. 1790, 12 1/2 in. (31.8 cm)

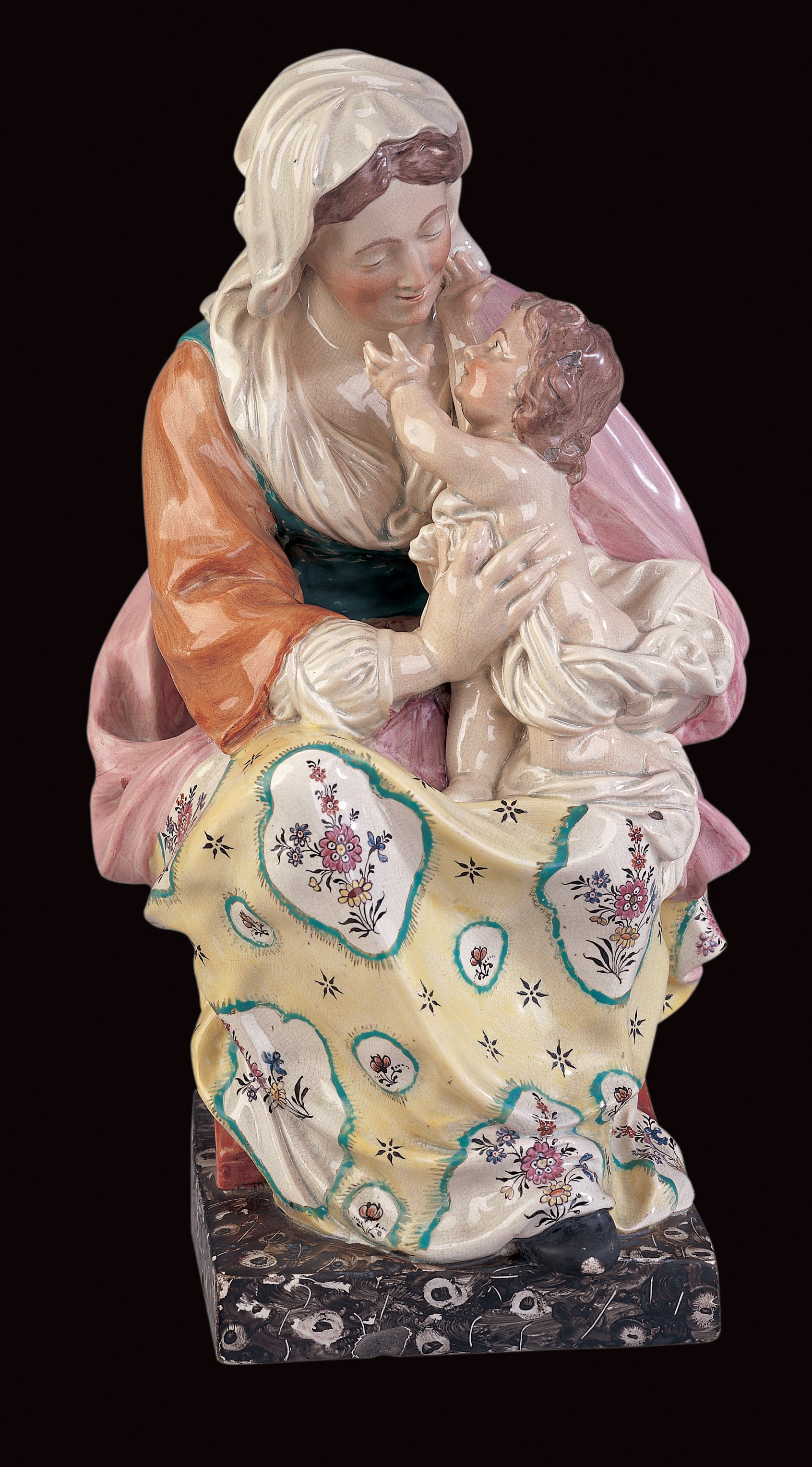
Madonna and Child, c. 1800, 34.5 cm

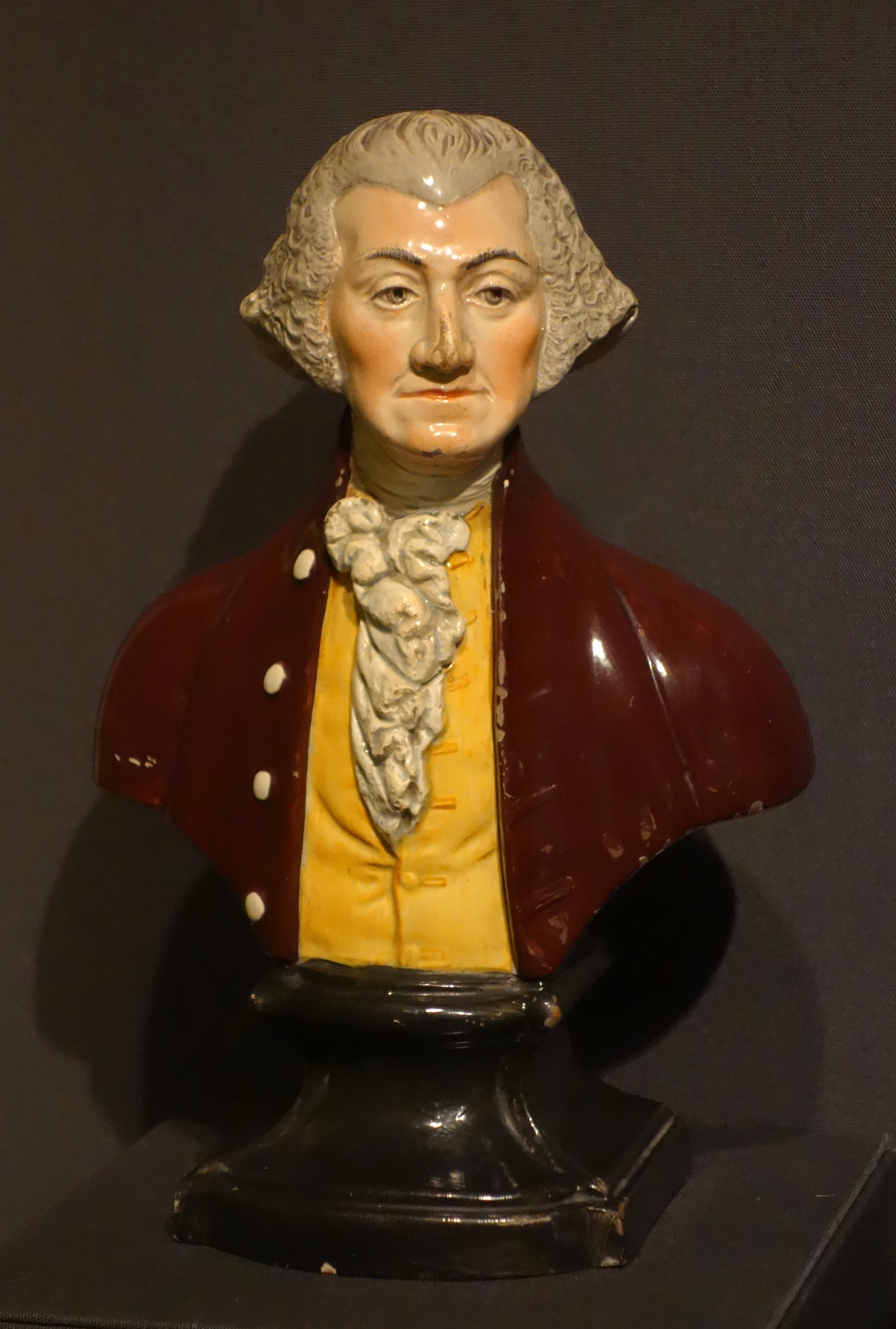
Bust of George Washington, c. 1818. Wood originally modelled this bust for Wedgwood many decades before.

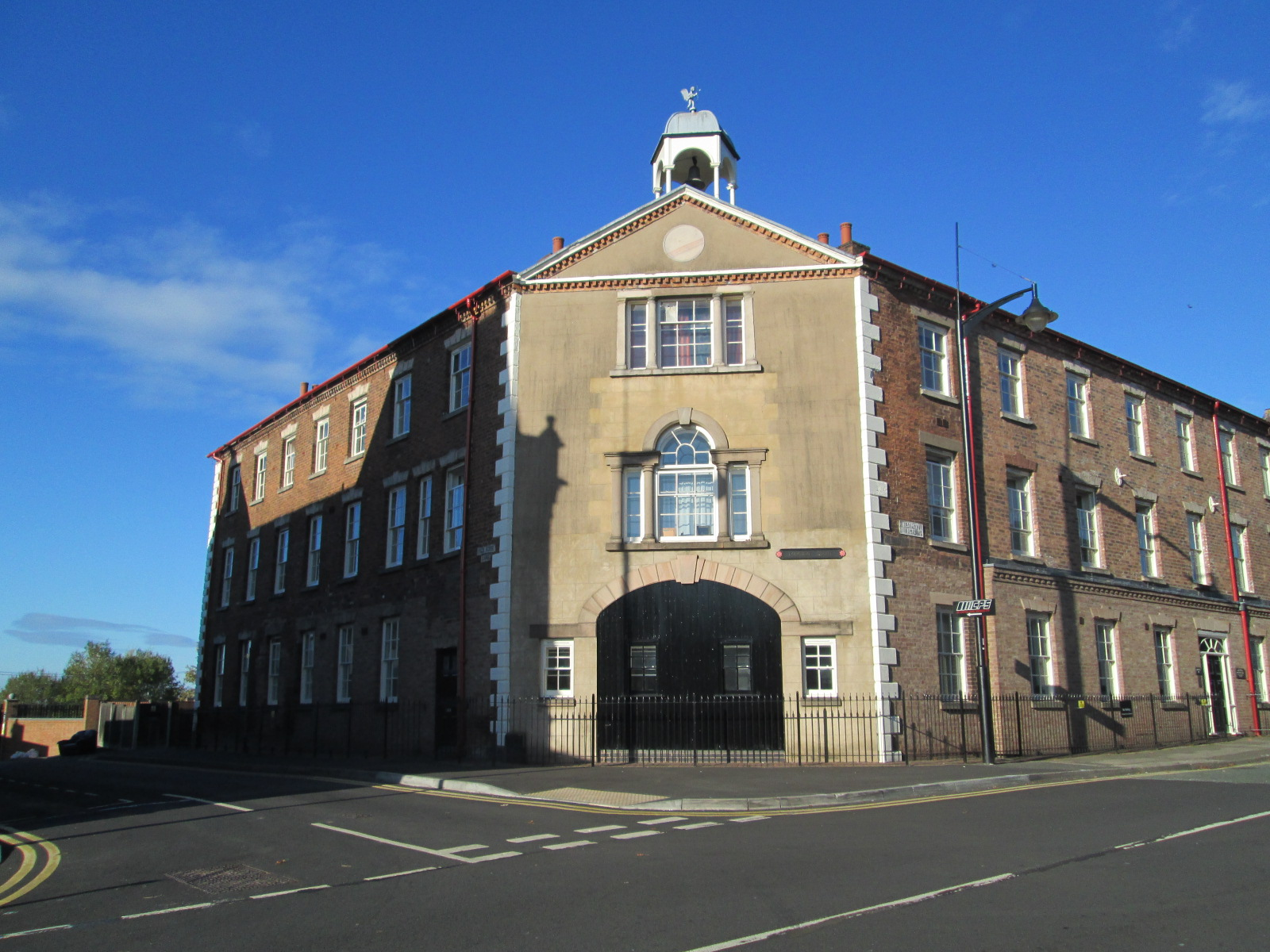
Frontage of the former Fountain Place Works in Burslem, built by Enoch Wood. A Grade II listed building.
