= Vodrey =

Vodrey is a surname. Notable people with the surname include:

- Frederick Vodrey (1845–1897), English potter
- Jabez Vodrey (1795–1861), English potter
- Rosemary Vodrey (born 1949), Canadian politician

== See also ==
- Will Vodery (1885–1951), American composer and conductor
