= Charles Shaw (potter) =

British potter (1832–1906)

Charles Shaw (1832 – 5 March 1906) was an English potter, born in Tunstall, Staffordshire.

He is notable for his autobiography (When I was a Child), published by Methuen in March 1903 under the name "An Old Potter". Shaw was a staunch Liberal and believer in free trade, who intended to warn of the dangers of protectionism. Fellow Liberal Robert Spence Watson wrote the book's introduction, calling it a reminder of the condition of child labour in the 1840s and as an inspiration to improve children's conditions. However, despite Watson financing 1500 copies, Shaw's autobiography did not sell well. The novelist Arnold Bennett used the book as a source for Clayhanger (1910) and it was republished in 1969, since when it has received more attention and is

...now valued both as a moving firsthand account of child labour in the pottery industry, and as a narrative of his ‘pursuit of knowledge under difficulties’, inspired by the values of self-help and his religious faith, which enabled him to escape from a life of manual labour. The book vividly illuminates many aspects of Potteries social history, such as popular recreations, life in the workhouse, and the riots of 1842, in a way unequalled by any other source. The popularity of ‘history from below’, and academic interest in working-class autobiographies, have established When I was a Child as not only an essential source for Potteries history, but also a classic of its kind and a memorial to its otherwise obscure author.
