= Enoch Wedgwood =

English potter (1813–1879)

Enoch Wedgwood (1813–1879) was an English potter, founder in 1860 of the pottery firm Wedgwood & Co of Tunstall, Stoke-on-Trent. He was a distant cousin of the famous potter Josiah Wedgwood, of Josiah Wedgwood & Sons but their two businesses were separate concerns.

Wedgwood married Jane Mattinson (1814–1880) in 1837. They had four children, one of whom died in infancy:

- Edmund Mattinson Wedgwood (1840–1904), potter.
- Charlotte (1843–?)
- Alfred Joseph Wedgwood (1845–1846) died in infancy.
- Alfred Enoch Wedgwood (1850–1894), potter.

Enoch Wedgwood became a partner in the firm of Podmore Walker & Co, originally founded in 1834 by Thomas Podmore (1791–1860) & Thomas Walker of Tunstall. Following the death of Thomas Podmore in 1860, Enoch Wedgwood inherited a share in the interests of the business left to him by Podmore. The firm carried in under the name of Wedgwood & Co. In later years Wedgwood & Co was renamed Enoch Wedgwood (Tunstall) Ltd in 1965 and in 1980 it was taken over by Josiah Wedgwood & Sons, who renamed it Unicorn Pottery.

Factory marks on pottery for company line (some marked "founded in 1835")
start year	end year	company name
1834	1860	Podimore Walker & Co.
1860	1965	Wedgwood & Co.
1965	1980	Enoch Wedgwood (Tunstall) Ltd
1980	--	Unicorn Pottery
