= Churchill China =

English pottery manufacturer

Churchill China PLC
- Type: Public Limited Company
- Industry: Ceramics
- Founded: 1795
- Headquarters: Sandyford, Stoke-on-Trent, England
- Website: http://www.churchill1795.com/

Churchill China PLC (LSE: CHH) is an English pottery manufacturer based in Stoke-on-Trent in England.

== History of the company ==
Churchill China traces its origins back to 1795 and the foundation of its first factory in what later became Stoke-on-Trent in Staffordshire, England, as a manufacturer of ceramic tableware.

The company markets products for both the hospitality and retail markets, exporting to countries across the world. In hospitality it is known and respected for the product and strength and durability. Design is at the core of the business and the company continues to bring out new and inspired design for chefs, restaurants, hotels and other horeca establishments. Some of which have won awards. Along with the base in Stoke-on-Trent, Churchill has showrooms in London and Madrid.

In April 2019 Churchill purchased the right to competitor Dudson's brand name and rights to its two most popular ranges - Harvest and Evo

On the retail Churchill has a longstanding reputation for working with licensed partners which over the years has included; Jeff Banks, Jamie Oliver, Cath Kidston, Disney, Royal Horticultural Society, as well as supporting some younger brand design-led niche brands. It also has two other English brands within the portfolio, Queens and James Sadler. Queens which originally was known for its English bone china but now is a modern eclectic collection based on consumer trend, whilst James Sadler and Sons Ltd, best known for its teapots, was established in 1882. It is perhaps best known globally though for its Blue Willow collection which is its oldest pattern and most collectible.
