= William Adams (potter) =

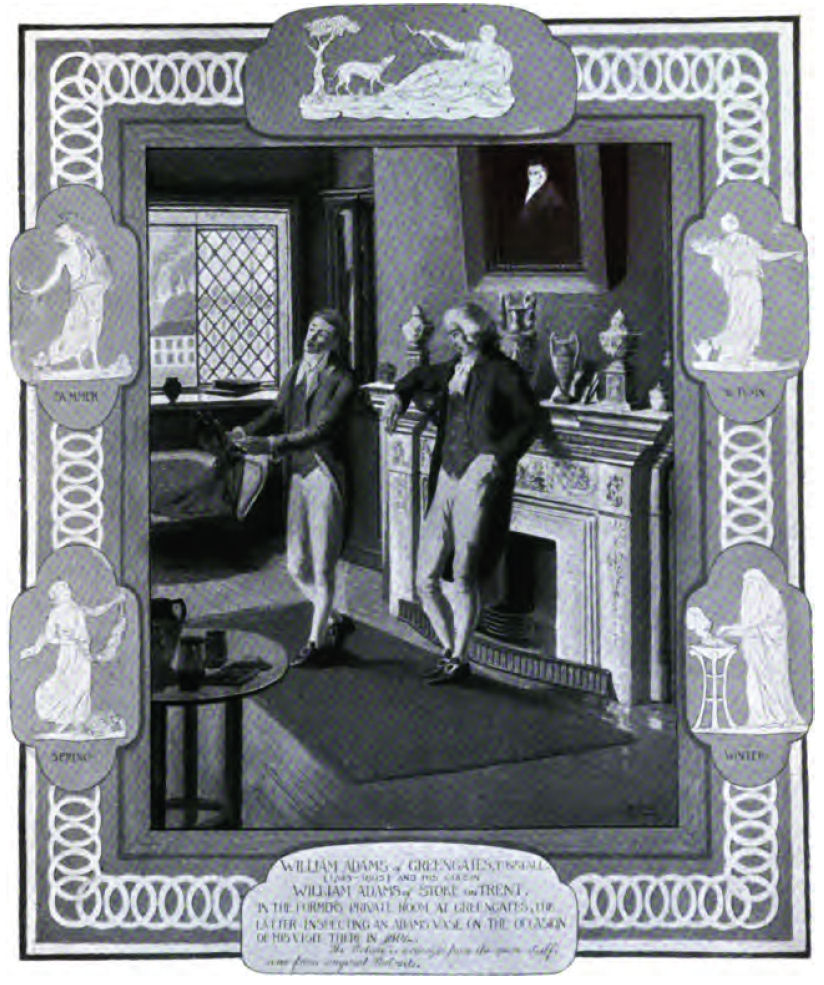
Depiction of William Adams (leaning against fireplace) with a cousin of the same name, at the former's house in Greengates

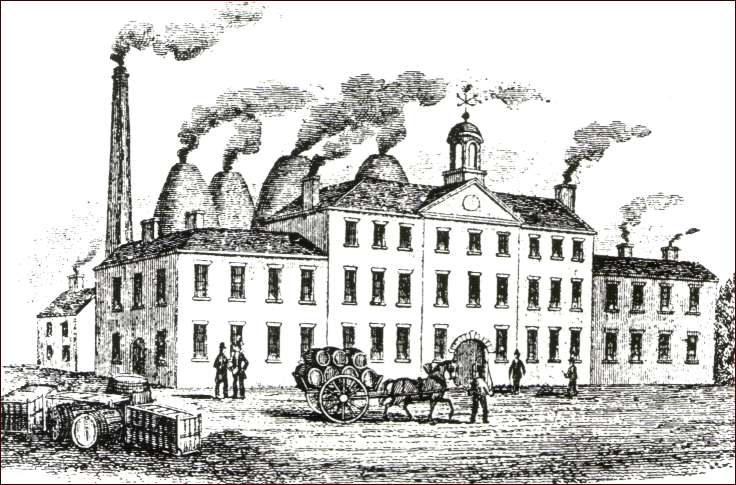
The Greengates Pottery, ca. 1780

William Adams (baptised 1746; died 1805) was an English potter, a maker of fine jasperware shortly after its development and introduction to the English market by Wedgwood.

Adams was one of three north Staffordshire William Adamses who were potters working at the time: all were cousins in an extended Adams family of potters of very many generations. This Adams founded the Greengates Pottery in 1779, producing fine jasperware table sets, plaques, medallions and other products stamped Adams & Co. He is said to have been a friend and confidant of Josiah Wedgwood during their entire lives, including the time when both were experimenting with jasperware. Adams has often been credited with improving on Josiah's original formula in colour, design, and stability while he worked at the Etruria Factory. This influence is said to have directly contributed to Wedgwood's success, before the period when Adams was working independently at Greengates.

== Biography ==
Adams was baptised in Tunstall, Staffordshire, the son of a potter. Born after the death of his father, he was raised by his grandfather, also a potter, who, according to the Oxford Dictionary of National Biography, placed him as an apprentice with John Brindley (brother of James Brindley, notable as a pioneer of canals). Other sources make him a "favourite pupil" and life-long "confidant" of Josiah Wedgwood. Some 300 of his works have been identified, but he is nowadays mainly known only to those with an interest in 18th century English ceramics.

Adams died in 1805, and his prosperous business was taken over by his younger son Benjamin; the business closed in 1820 in part due to Benjamin's ill health and was sold in 1826 to John Meir, but in 1897 was sold back to another branch of the Adams family, and was finally absorbed into the Wedgwood Group in 1966.

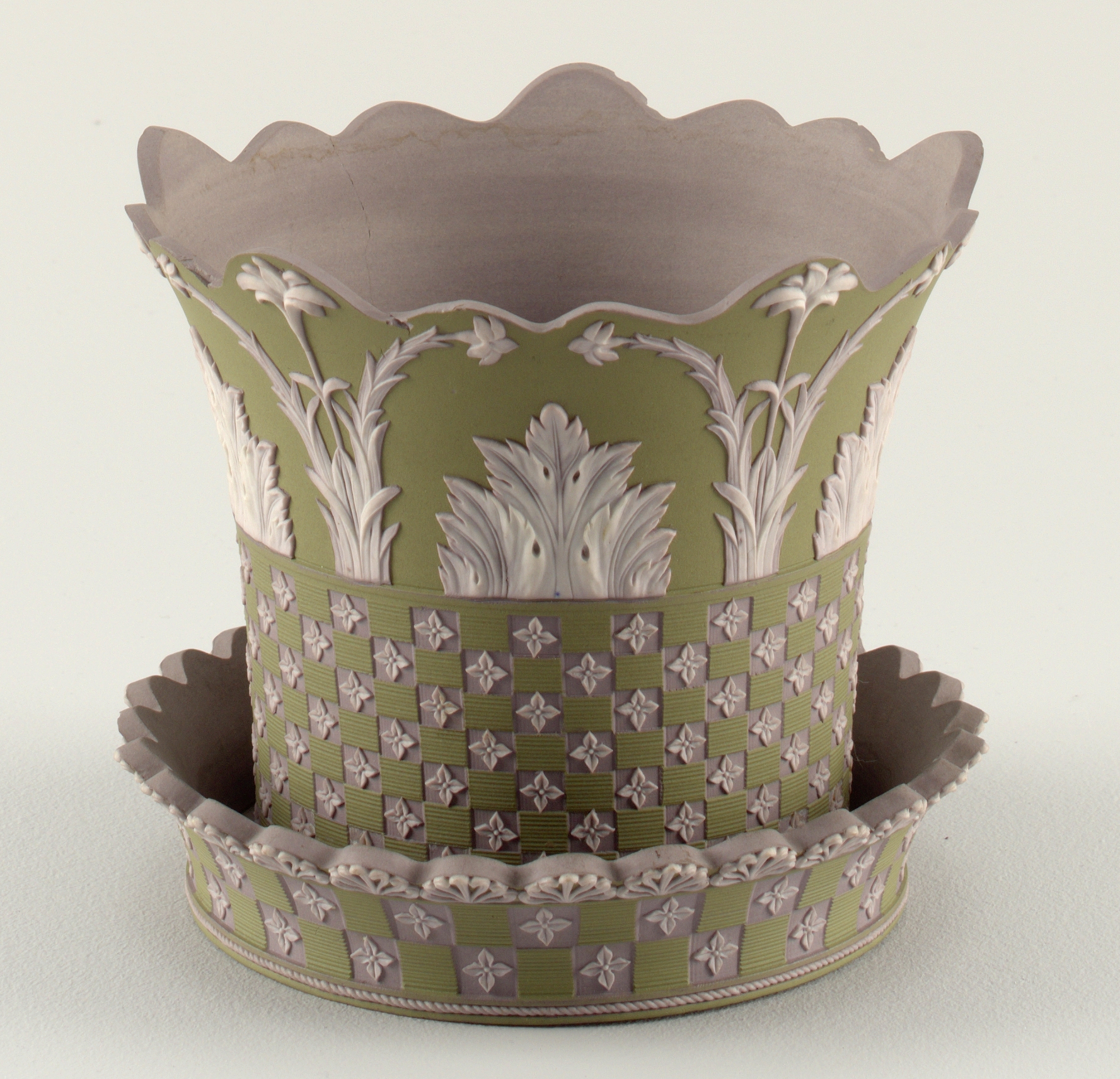
Lilac, white and green jasperware cachepot with saucer, 1785–1790, William Adams & Sons

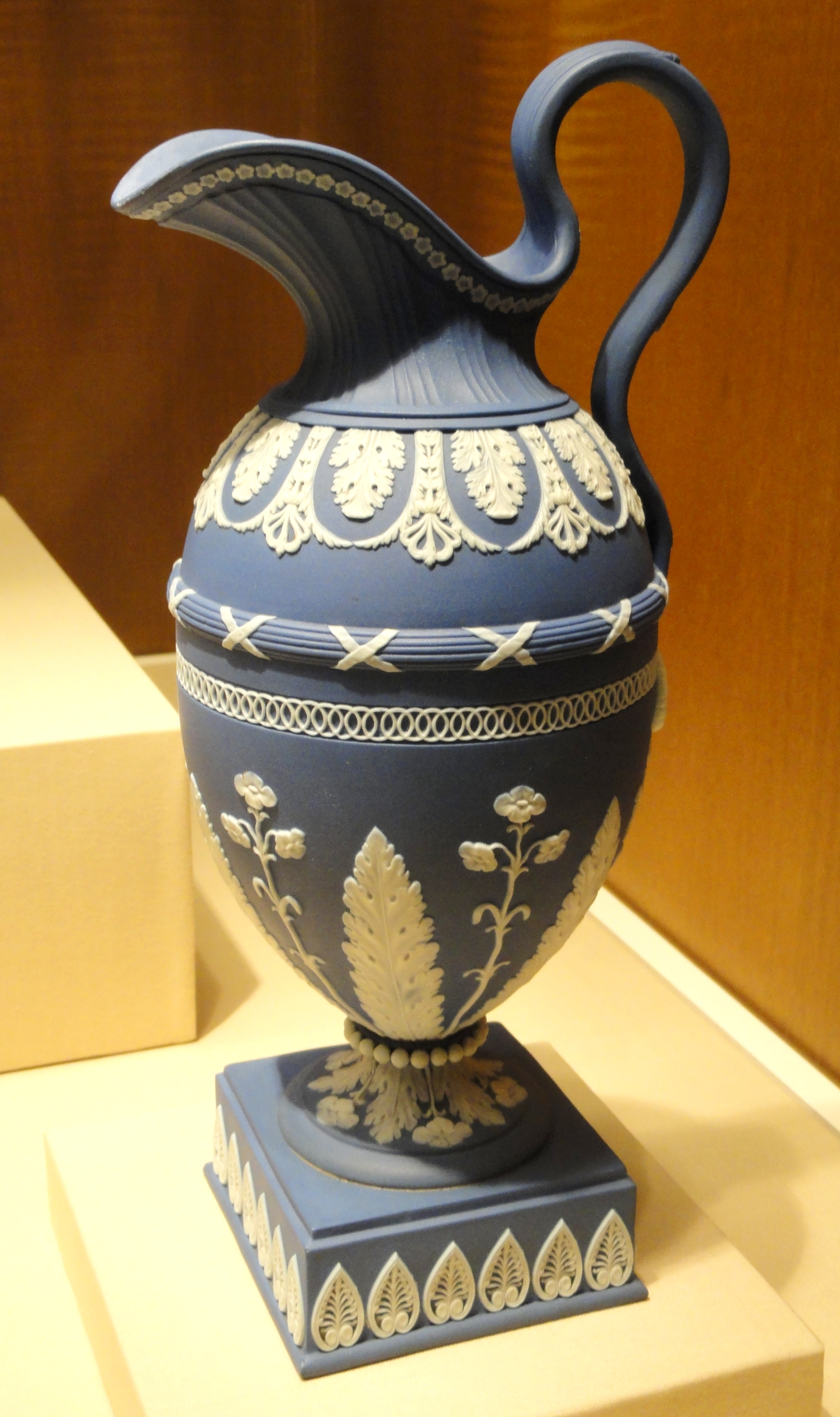
Jasperware decorative ewer, possibly William Adams & Sons, Staffordshire, c. 1790

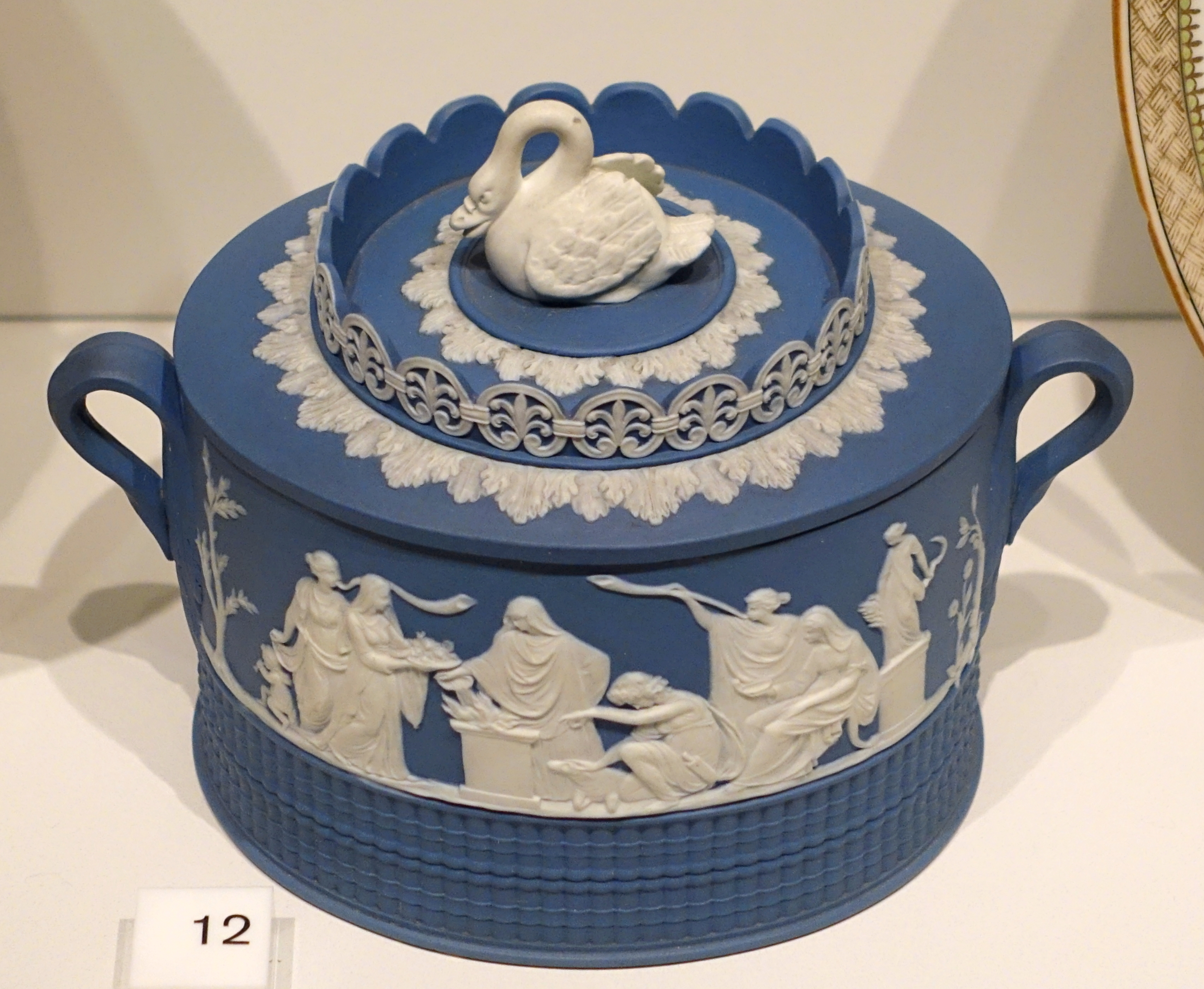
Sugar bowl and cover, William Adams & Sons Ltd, Tunstall and Stoke, Staffordshire, 1787-1805, blue jasperware with applied white reliefs

== Sources ==
- Wood, Frank L., The World of British Stoneware: Its History, Manufacture and Wares, 2014, Troubador Publishing Ltd, ISBN 178306367X, 9781783063673
