= James Sadler and Sons Ltd =

UK pottery manufacturer (1882–2000)

- Industry: Pottery
- Founded: 1882; 144 years ago in Burslem, Stoke-on-Trent, England
- Founder: James Sadler
- Defunct: 2000
- Fate: Went into receivership; rights purchased by Churchill China
- Products: Teapots

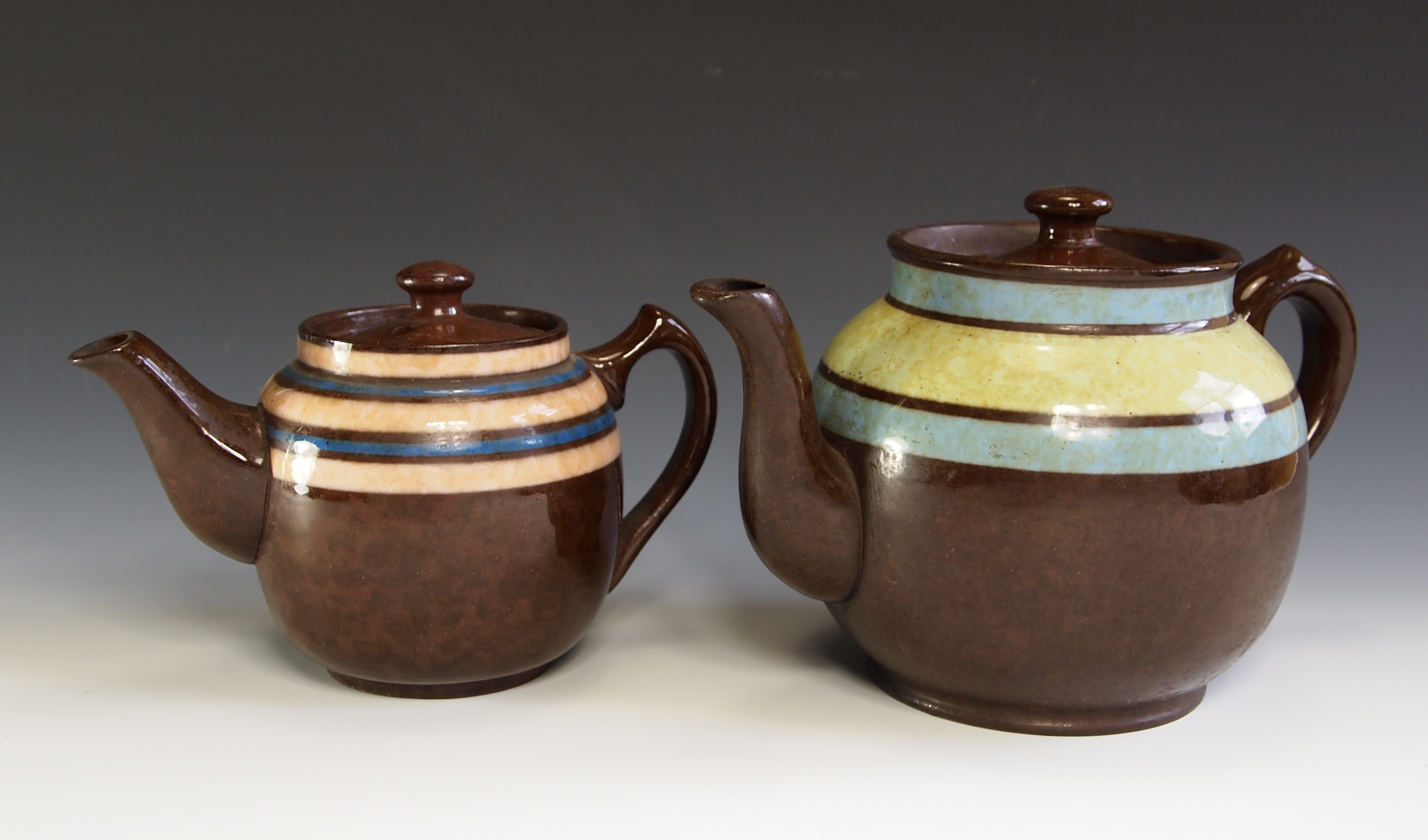
Sadler "Brown Betty" teapots.

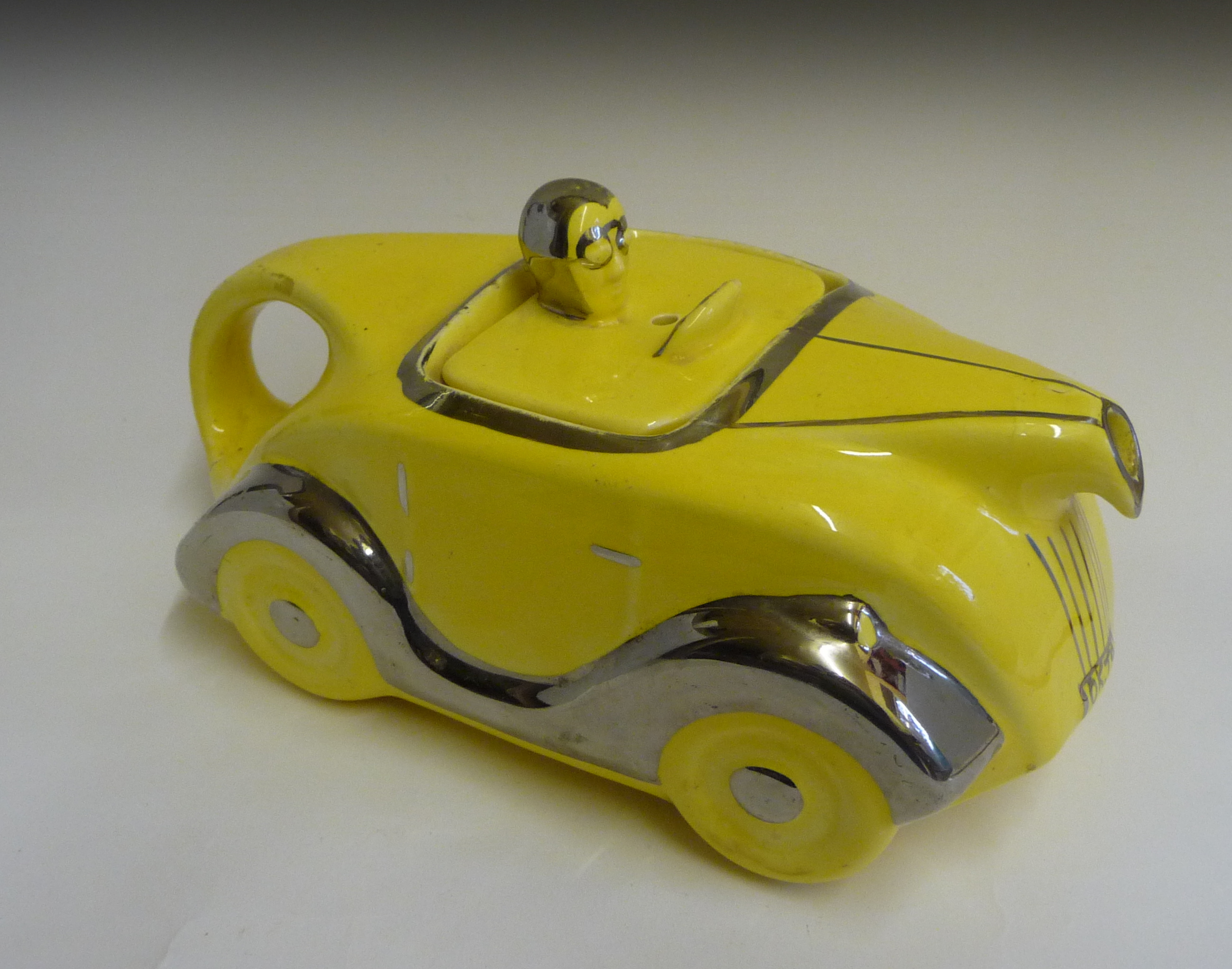
Sadler racing car teapot 1930s.

James Sadler and Sons Ltd was a pottery manufacturer founded in 1882 by James Sadler in Burslem, Stoke-on-Trent, United Kingdom.

== History ==
The company specialised in "Brown Betty" teapots. Early versions were terracotta with a transparent glaze, and were shaped by jiggering, jolleying and slipcasting, later they were white earthenware glazed with a Rockingham brown glaze and shaped entirely by slipcasting.

They began making novelty shaped teapots in the 1930s, Crinoline ladies, a father Christmas teapot and, in 1938, the iconic racing car teapot, followed by a tank with "Old Bill" as the lid in 1947. The early pre war racing car teapots were usually decorated with silver lustre and are marked "Made In England" with the design registration number 820236 impressed on the base. They were glazed in green, yellow, cream, black, blue, grey, pink and maroon. The licence plate reads "OKT42". There is also a version decorated with Mabel Lucie Attwell cartoon characters.

In 1999 the product line was cut from 850 to just 340 and some production was outsourced overseas.

In April 2000 the company went into receivership and Churchill China purchased the right to use the company's brand name and designs. Peter Sadler sparked controversy by blaming his company's failure on cheap foreign imports.
