= 46th Pennsylvania Infantry Regiment =

Union Army infantry regiment

46th Pennsylvania Volunteer Infantry
- Pennsylvania flag
- Active: September 1861 – July 16, 1865
- Country: United States
- Allegiance: Union
- Branch: Infantry
- Engagements: First Battle of Winchester; Battle of Cedar Mountain; Battle of Antietam; Battle of Chancellorsville; Battle of Gettysburg; Battle of Resaca; Battle of New Hope Church; Battle of Kolb's Farm; Battle of Peachtree Creek; Battle of Bentonville

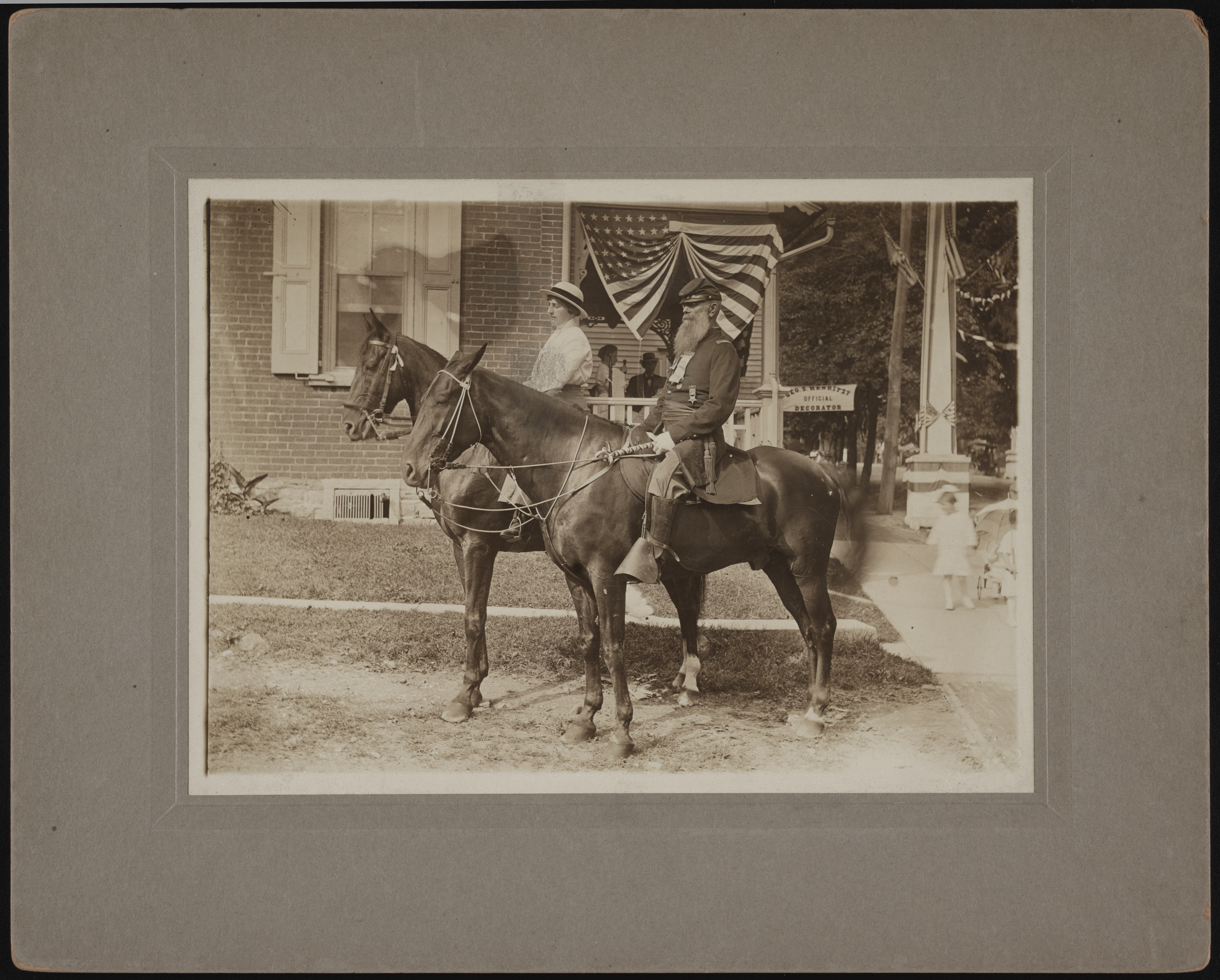
Joseph Matchette of Co. C, 46th Pennsylvania Infantry Regiment. From the Liljenquist Family Collection of Civil War Photographs, Prints and Photographs Division, Library of Congress. He is pictured with his aide, Mrs. Minnie Lazarus, on horseback

The 46th Pennsylvania Volunteer Infantry was a Union Army regiment in the American Civil War. It served in both the Eastern and Western Theaters, most notably at the 1862 Battle of Cedar Mountain and during the 1864 Atlanta campaign. During the war, the regiment lost 17% of its strength through combat losses and disease.

== History ==
=== Organization and early movements ===
The regiment was recruited in Allegheny, Berks, Dauphin, Luzerne, Mifflin, Northampton, Northumberland, and Potter counties, and mustered into service on September 4, 1861, under the command of Colonel Joseph F. Knipe. At Camp Curtin, in Harrisburg, they were formally accepted into the service of the United States and received their uniforms and equipment. Additionally, they were presented with their regimental colors by Pennsylvania Governor Andrew Curtin.

From late September 1861 through February 1862, the 46th was stationed on the upper Potomac River in Maryland, performing guard and outpost duty in Brig. Gen. Alpheus S. Williams' division, assigned to Maj. Gen. Nathaniel P. Banks' corps. During this time, on September 22, Maj. Arnold Lewis was shot and killed by Pvt. John Lanahan of Company I while trying to enforce discipline, for which he was sentenced by military court to be executed. He was hanged on December 23 of that year, in front of his gathered brigade.

By March 1862, the regiment had crossed the Potomac and reached Winchester, Virginia, beginning their part in what was to become the Valley Campaign. After a brief foray to Manassas, they were ordered back to Winchester and subsequently started a long march up the Shenandoah Valley, reaching as far south as Harrisonburg. From there they began a retrograde movement in which they fell back to the vicinity of Strasburg. On May 24 they again arrived at Winchester after a desperate march to reach the town before General Stonewall Jackson's troops. The next day they fought the First Battle of Winchester, in which, heavily outnumbered, General Banks' troops were forced to frantically retreat thirty-five miles to Williamsport, Maryland, on the north bank of the Potomac.

=== Battle of Cedar Mountain ===
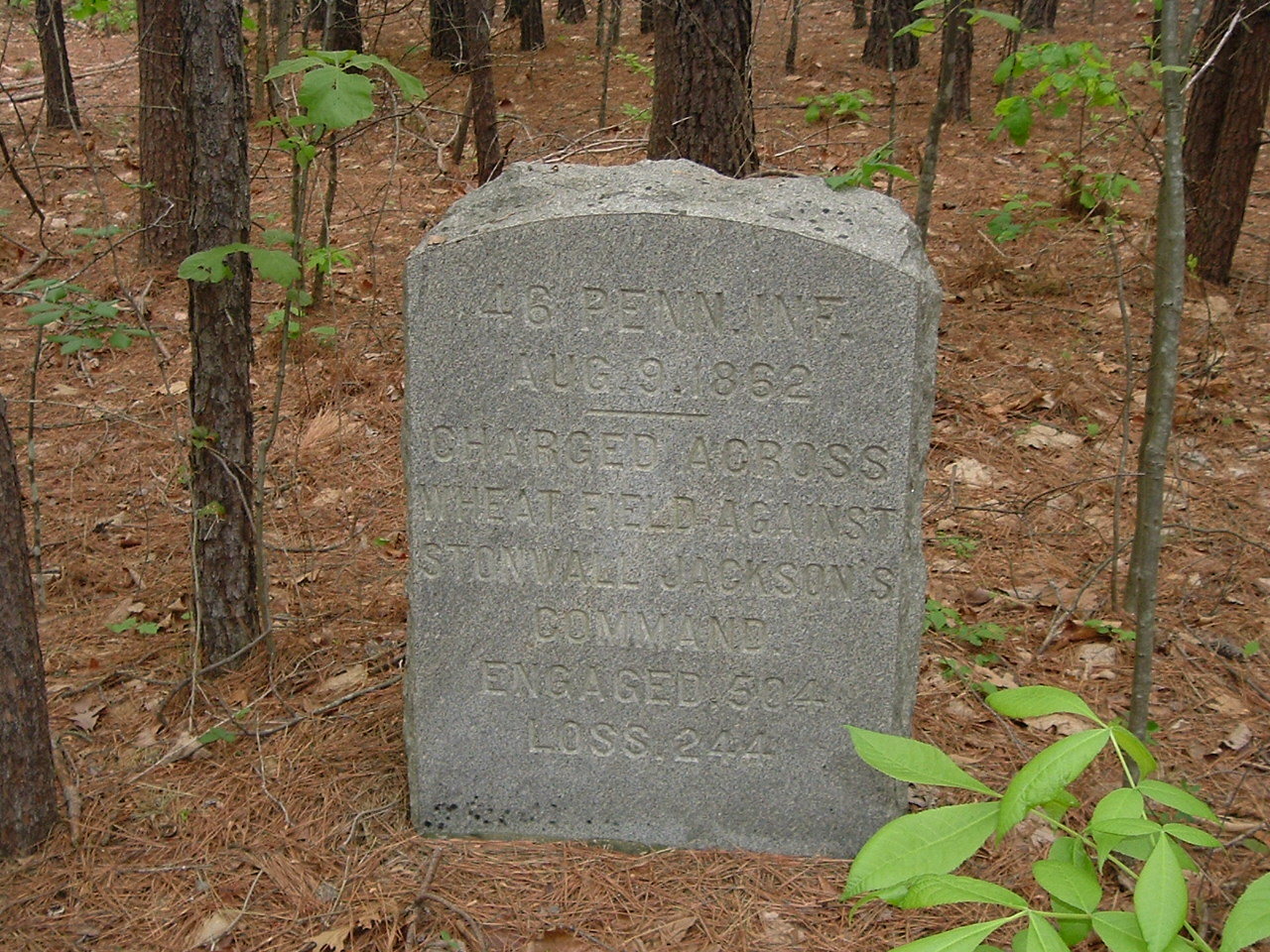
46th Pennsylvania Monument, Cedar Mountain Battlefield

In early August, Banks' corps, now part of Maj. Gen. John Pope's Army of Virginia, was stationed at Culpeper, Virginia. With reports of Jackson's Confederate troops marching in their direction, the 46th and the rest of their brigade under Brig. Gen. Samuel W. Crawford were ordered to attack them near a promontory named Cedar Mountain. Advancing across a wheat field, Crawford's brigade smashed into the left of Jackson's line and collapsed elements of two brigades there, including the vaunted Stonewall Brigade. During the confusion of battle, the 46th split in two directions, with the right half engaging the right flank of the Stonewall Brigade, and the left half tangling with the left end of Brig. Gen. Richard B. Garnett's brigade. The fighting here was close and savage, including hand-to-hand combat. However, with no Union reinforcements immediately sent to sustain this breakthrough, and with pressure from additional Rebel troops sent to shore up and rally this end of the line, Crawford's men were soon outflanked and forced to retreat back across the wheat field.

The Battle of Cedar Mountain devastated the ranks of the 46th. Out of a total of 504 engaged, the regiment lost 31 killed, 102 wounded, and 111 taken prisoner or missing, a casualty rate of 48%. Due to these losses, the regiment was not actively engaged in the Second Battle of Bull Run at the end of August. However, at the Battle of Antietam on September 17, in spite of still having a fraction of their former number, they nevertheless saw action and lost an additional six killed and three wounded.

After Antietam, the regiment occupied Maryland Heights opposite Harpers Ferry, Virginia, where they were placed on picket duty, lasting through the middle of December, when they marched to Fairfax, Virginia, and remained there until mid-January 1863.

=== 1863 ===
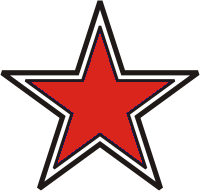
Union Army, XII Corps, 1st Division Badge

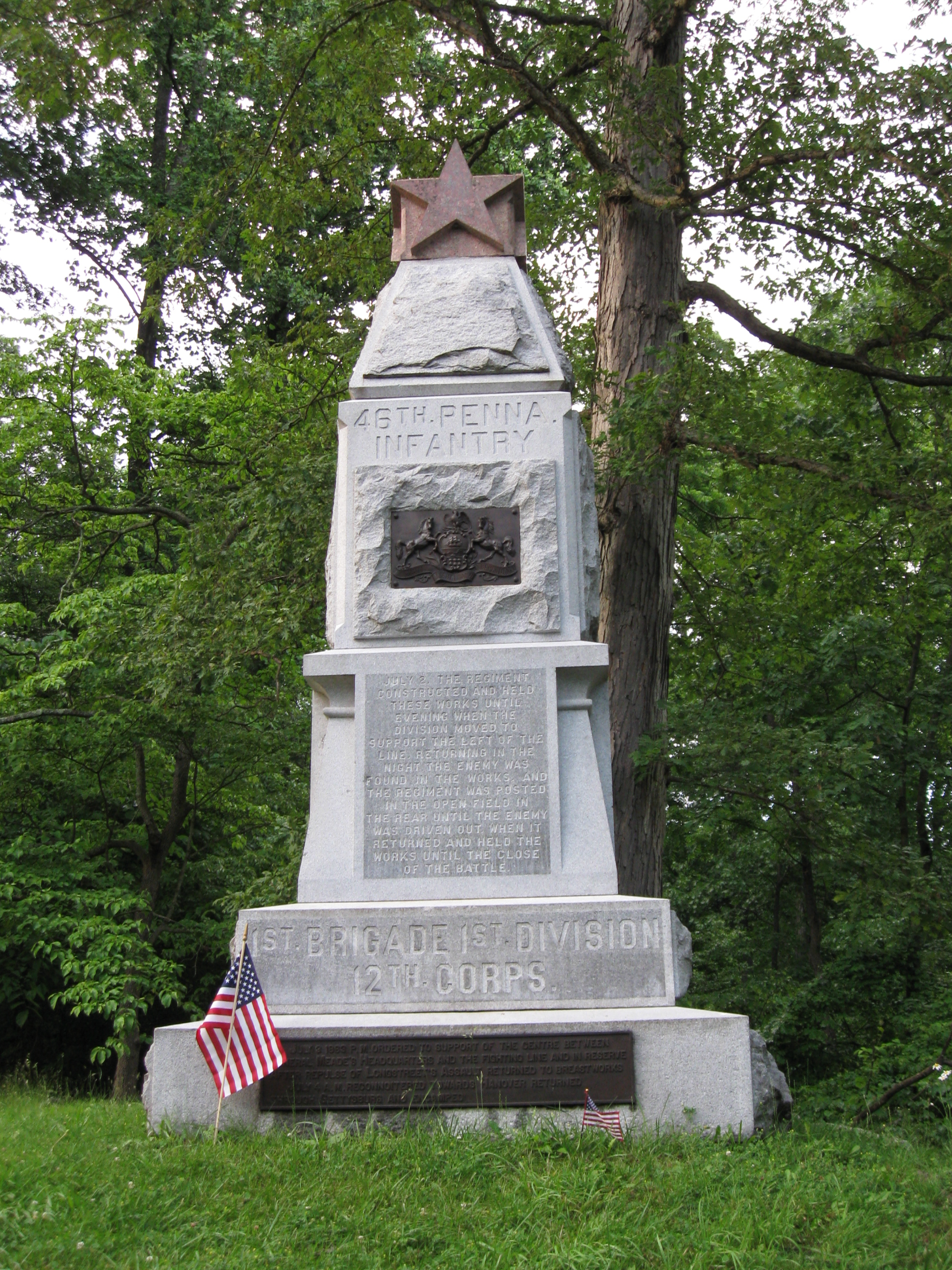
46th Pennsylvania monument on Culp's Hill at Gettysburg

Subsequent to having taken part in Maj. Gen. Ambrose Burnside's Mud March January 20–24, 1863, the 46th went into winter camp at Stafford Courthhouse, Virginia and remained there into late April. That spring, Union Maj. Gen. Joseph Hooker reorganized the Army of the Potomac, of which he was now in command. One of Hooker's initiatives included assigning each army corps a particular badge symbol, color-coded to indicate the division to which the wearer of the badge belonged. Hence, the men of the 46th now wore a red star, indicative of their assignment to the First Division of the XII Corps.

Thus organized, at the end of April, the regiment marched up the Rappahannock River around Gen. Robert E. Lee's left flank, on their way toward the Battle of Chancellorsville. On the Morning of May 3 (after General Jackson's wounding), the resumption of the famous 'Flank Attack' bore heavily upon the 1st Division. Generally, the XII Corps played a significant role throughout the battle in defending their part of Hooker's line and covering the army's retreat afterward.

After Colonel Knipe had been promoted to Brigadier General, command was taken over by Colonel James Lercon Selfridge. In June, Lee began advancing his Army of Northern Virginia through Maryland and into Pennsylvania, and the 46th likewise marched north with the Army of the Potomac to stop him, at the Battle of Gettysburg. However, the regiment had a limited role in the battle. After first occupying a position near the Union line's right flank on Culp's Hill late July 1, they were ordered to march toward the left flank in support of the line on Cemetery Ridge. They later countermarched back to Culp's Hill, but now found the enemy occupying the breastworks they had earlier constructed, and instead remained in a reserve position. The only casualties the 46th suffered at Gettysburg were the result of friendly fire from a Union battery posted on Powers Hill behind them. With Lee defeated at Gettysburg and retreating back into Virginia, the Army of the Potomac pursued him to the Rappahannock River.

In September, the XI and XII Corps were detached from the Army of the Potomac and transferred west by rail to Tennessee to aid Maj. Gen. William Rosecrans, who was besieged in Chattanooga. For the remainder of 1863, the 46th was assigned to guard duty near Bridgeport, Alabama, on the rail lines leading to Nashville.

=== 1864 ===
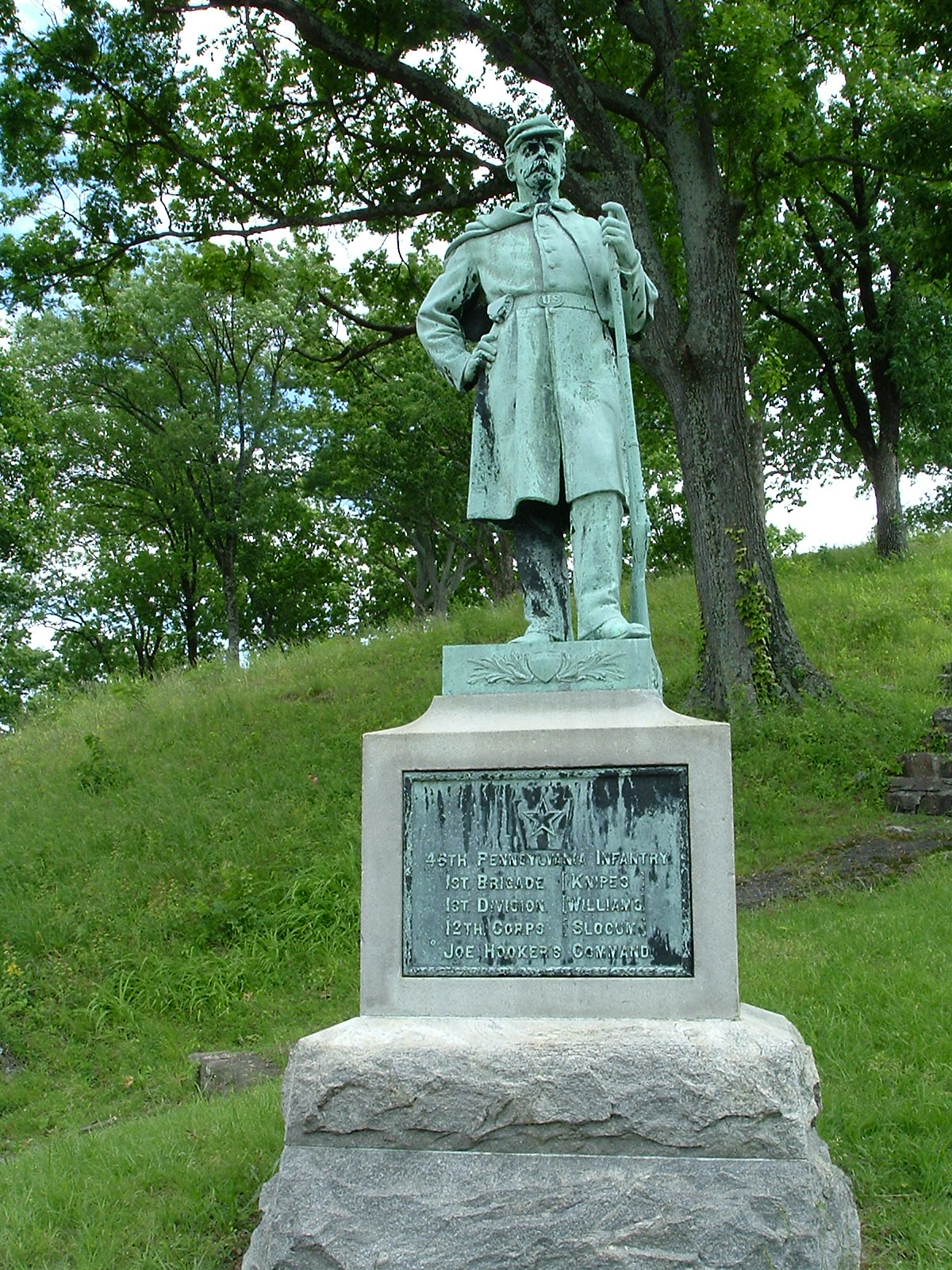
46th Pennsylvania monument on Orchard Knob, Chattanooga, Tennessee

In January 1864, enough of the officers and men of the regiment volunteered to re-enlist for an additional three years' service that the unit was granted “veteran” status, which entitled them to a thirty-day furlough, and to thenceforward be referred to as 46th Pennsylvania Veteran Volunteer Infantry. Additionally, the XI Corps and XII Corps were now consolidated into one and reorganized as the XX Corps, taking the XII Corps badge as their insignia. However, still being assigned to the First Division of the corps, the men of the regiment retained their red star badges.

The first week of May saw the beginning of Maj. Gen. William Tecumseh Sherman's Atlanta campaign. The 46th was actively engaged in the fighting at the Battle of Resaca on May 14 and 15, and the Battle of New Hope Church on the 25th of the same month.

Throughout June, Sherman continued to attempt to outmaneuver Confederate Gen. Joseph E. Johnston's forces. On the 22nd, the regiment saw a stiff fight at the Battle of Kolb's Farm. In this battle, the men had stacked their arms toward the rear of a position they had just begun to fortify with breastworks, when suddenly two divisions of Confederate troops appeared in the clearing. After running to retrieve their rifles and loading them as they returned to the line, the 46th and the rest of their brigade, supported by artillery, proceeded to handily repulse the Rebels, inflicting terrible casualties, but incurring very few of their own.

==== Peachtree Creek ====
In mid-July, with Sherman practically on the doorstep of Atlanta, Confederate President Jefferson Davis demonstrated his dissatisfaction with Gen. Joseph E. Johnston's efforts to stop him by relieving him of command and placing the troops under Gen. John Bell Hood instead. Living up to his aggressive and often reckless nature, Hood wasted little time in ordering an attack on the Union forces near Peachtree Creek. Late in the afternoon on July 20, the Confederates assaulted Union Maj. Gen. George Henry Thomas' Army of the Cumberland, to which the XX Corps was assigned, catching them completely off guard. Occupying the right flank of Alpheus Williams' First Division, the 46th was in danger of being overlapped by the Confederates. The companies positioned on the right were ordered to refuse the regiment's line, or pull back to form a right angle to the companies on the left. Eventually, with reinforcements arriving to plug a gap between Williams and the next Union division to his right, the Confederates were beaten back. For the 46th, the Battle of Peachtree Creek was second only to Cedar Mountain in the losses they sustained: 26 officers and men killed or mortally wounded, 86 wounded, and 1 missing.

Following the Battle of Atlanta on July 22, Sherman enveloped the fortifications around the city and settled in for a siege, which lasted until September 2. After occupying Atlanta for two and a half months, the Union forces then set out on Sherman's March to the Sea, with the 46th among the ranks, on November 15, ending with the capture of Savannah, Georgia, on December 22.

=== End of the war ===
From Savannah, the 46th turned north with Sherman's army and marched through South Carolina and into North Carolina in what became known as the Carolinas campaign. At the Bennett Place near Durham, North Carolina, Confederate Gen. Joe Johnston surrendered his forces to Sherman. With hostilities now being ended, the regiment continued their march north through Virginia and into Washington, D.C., where on May 24 they took their place in the Grand Review of the Armies. On July 16, the men of 46th Pennsylvania Veteran Volunteers were formally mustered out of service of the United States.

== Losses ==
Over the course of the war, the 46th Pennsylvania had 1794 officers and men enrolled in its ranks. Of these, 179, or 10%, were killed or mortally wounded. An additional 138 died of disease, for a total of 317, or 17% deaths. John Wadsworth Vodrey, son of noted American potter Jabez Vodrey, was killed at the Battle of New Hope Church while serving with the regiment.

== Books ==
Four books have been published that cover the regiment's history or soldiers who served in its ranks.

- American Citizen: The Civil War Writings of Captain George A. Brooks, Company D, 46th Pennsylvania Infantry (2019)
- Bethlehem Boy: The Civil War Letters & Diary of James A. Peifer (2007)
- Surviving Stonewall: A story of volunteers who became veterans fighting against Thomas J. "Stonewall" Jackson (2016)
- They Knew No Glory: A story of the Veteran Volunteers who brought an end to the American Civil War (2019)

== Re-enactors ==
A group of musicians from Central Pennsylvania, known as the 46th Pennsylvania Regiment Band (The Logan Guard), portrays the regimental band that accompanied the 46th in the first part of its service, until being discharged in August 1862.

== See also ==
- List of Pennsylvania Civil War regiments
