= Christ Church, Tunstall =

Christ Church
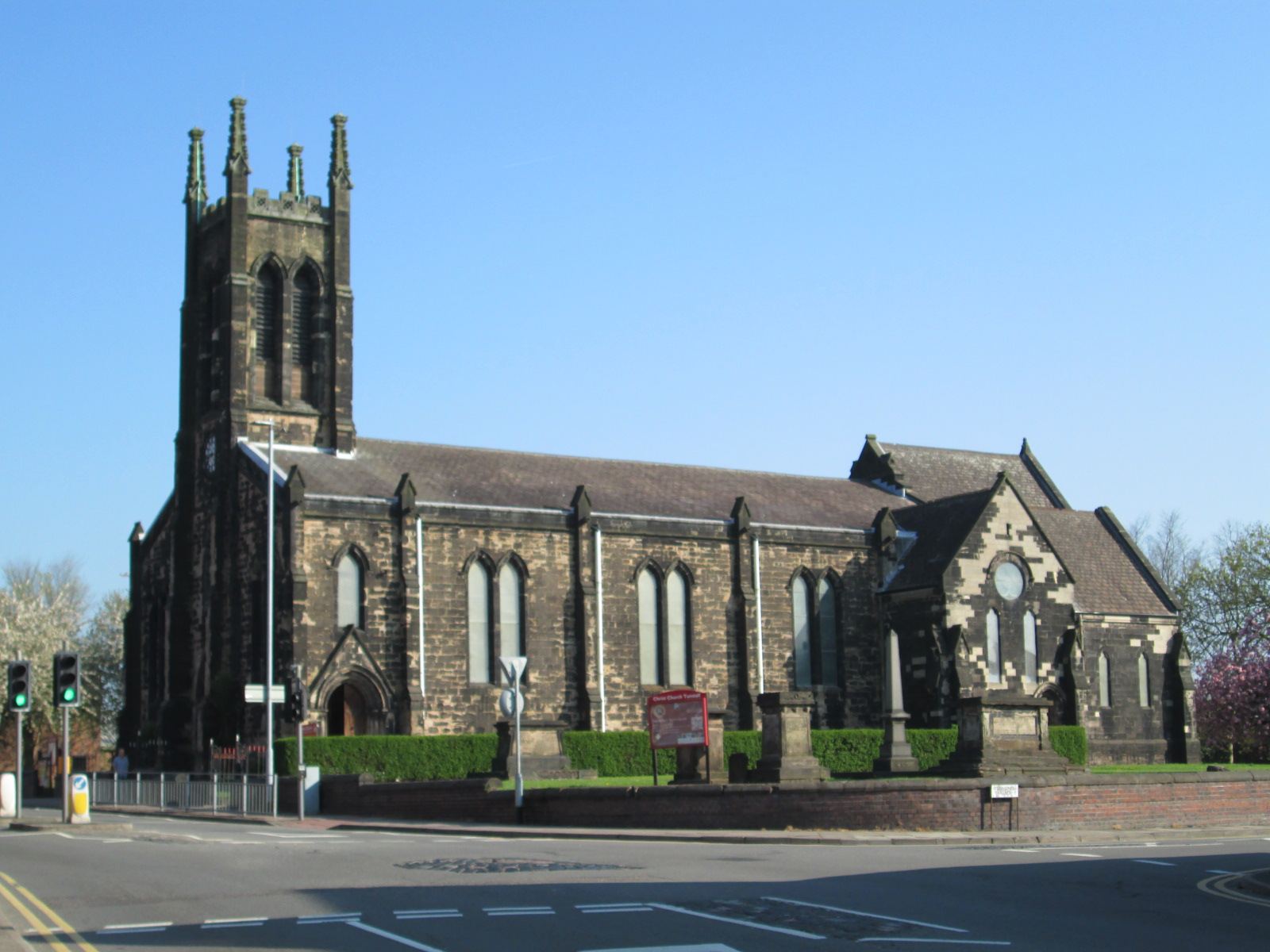
- Christ Church
- 53°3′45.1″N 2°12′39.8″W
- OS grid reference: SJ 859 517
- Location: Tunstall, Stoke-on-Trent
- Country: England
- Denomination: Church of England
- Website: www.gandtparish.co.uk

Architecture
- Heritage designation: Grade II
- Designated: 15 March 1993
- Architect: Francis Bedford
- Completed: 1832

Administration
- Diocese: Diocese of Lichfield
- Parish: Goldenhill and Tunstall

Christ Church is an Anglican church in Tunstall, Stoke-on-Trent, Staffordshire, England. It is the parish church of Goldenhill and Tunstall; the combined parish, which is an Anglo-Catholic parish, was created in 2010. It is a Grade II listed building.

== History ==
The church is a Commissioners' church, designed by Francis Bedford and built in 1831–1832. £3,000 of the total cost was provided by parliamentary grant, and the remaining £1,000 by private subscription. It was consecrated by the Bishop of Lichfield, Henry Ryder, on 14 August 1832.

The church was built of Chell stone. It has lancet windows, in pairs or single; the tower originally had an octagonal spire, which was removed in 1971 for safety reasons. In 1885–1886 the east end was redesigned by A. R. Wood: a larger chancel was created, flanked by a south chapel and by an organ chamber, and two shallow transepts were created.

There was originally a single bell, which was replaced by a peal of six bells in 1856. Two more were added in the early 20th century.

== See also ==
- Listed buildings in Stoke-on-Trent
- List of Commissioners' churches in the English Midlands
