= Tunstall Town Hall =

Municipal building in Tunstall, Staffordshire, England

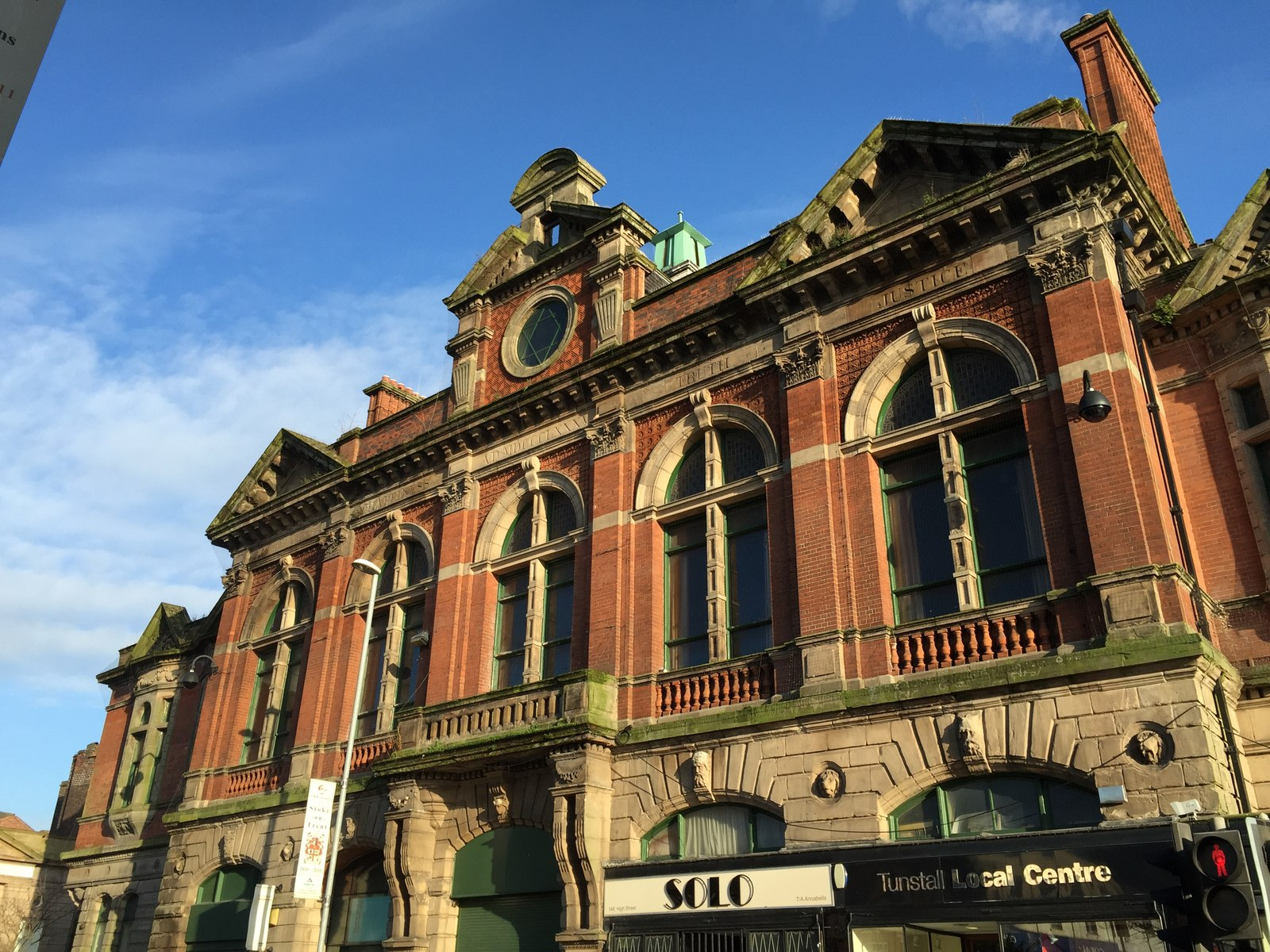
- Tunstall Town Hall

- Shown in Staffordshire
- 53.0585°N 2.2100°W
- Location: High Street, Tunstall

History
- Built: 1885

Site notes
- Architect: Absalom Wood
- Architectural style: Renaissance style

Listed Building – Grade II
- Official name: Former Town Hall, National Westminster Bank and shops
- Designated: 18 May 1989
- Reference no.: 1290967

Tunstall Town Hall is a municipal building in the High Street in Tunstall, Staffordshire, England. The structure, which was the meeting place of Tunstall Urban District Council, is a Grade II listed building.

== History ==
The first town hall in Tunstall was a small neoclassical style town hall in the middle of Tower Square which was completed in 1816. (Note: The first town hall was demolished in 1892: it was replaced by a clock tower, which was paid for by public subscription, erected to commemorate the life of a locally-born naval officer, Admiral Smith Child, and completed in 1893.) After the first town hall became inadequate, the local board of health decided to procure a more substantial structure: the site chosen was the western end of the market hall, which had itself been designed by George Thomas Robinson in the neoclassical style and completed in 1855. The market hall had to be reduced in size to accommodate the new town hall.

The new building was designed by local architect Absalom Wood in the Renaissance style, built in red brick with terracotta dressings at a cost of £14,000 and completed in 1885. The design involved a symmetrical main frontage with nine bays facing onto the High Street; the central section of five bays, which slightly projected forward, featured arched openings on the ground floor, to allow access to shops and to the market hall, the central opening being flanked by brackets supporting a balcony. There were round headed windows on the first floor flanked by Corinthian order pilasters supporting an entablature bearing the inscription "Peace, Happiness, Truth, Justice AD MDCCCLXXXV" and a heavily modillioned cornice. The central bay featured an attic floor with an oculus containing a Star of David flanked by pilasters supporting an open pediment; the outer bays in the central section were also pedimented. Internally, the principal rooms were the central hall, the courtroom and the council chamber.

Following significant population growth, largely associated with ceramic production, Tunstall became an urban district with the new town hall as its headquarters in 1894. The building continued to serve in that capacity into the early 20th century but ceased to be the local seat of government when the Federation of Stoke-on-Trent was formed in March 1910. The ground floor of the building continued to be used for retail purposes while the first floor was used as an events venue: performers included the punk rock band, Crass, in April 1982 and the punk rock band, Discharge, in July 1983.

The Potteries Heritage Society made an unsuccessful attempt to get the building listed in the mid-1980s, when Stoke-on-Trent had a low number of listed buildings. Although some buildings in the city were given protection around this time (such as the Tunstall clock tower), the total of listed buildings remained much the same until the end of the 1980s when the city was resurveyed, resulting in more protection for industrial sites and civic landmarks. In 1989 the town hall was listed (as part of a group listing containing other buildings in the centre of Tunstall). However, the building was neglected and fell into a state of serious state of disrepair in the 1990s.

An extensive programme of restoration works, being undertaken by G. F. Tomlinson at a cost of £3.8 million, commenced in June 2019. The works were intended to enable the building to host the local library, a children's centre and a local community hub.
