= Joseph F. Knipe =

Joseph Farmer Knipe
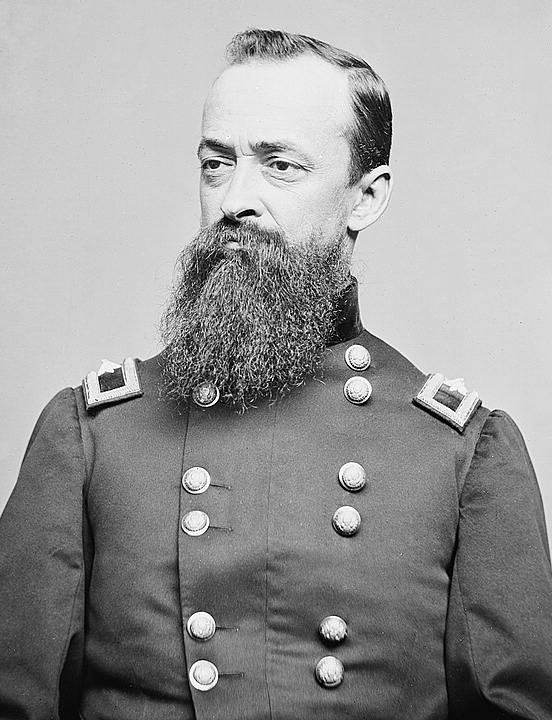
- Joseph Farmer Knipe
- Born: March 30, 1823; Mount Joy, Pennsylvania, U.S.
- Died: August 18, 1901 (aged 78); Harrisburg, Pennsylvania, U.S.
- Burial place: Harrisburg Cemetery, Harrisburg, Pennsylvania
- Military career
- Allegiance: United States of America; Union
- Branch: United States Army; Union Army
- Service years: 1842–1847, 1861–1865
- Rank: Brigadier General
- Unit: 2nd U.S. Artillery Regiment
- Commands: 46th Pennsylvania Infantry
- Conflicts: Mexican-American War; American Civil War

Joseph Farmer Knipe (March 30, 1823 – August 18, 1901) was a brigadier general in the Union Army during the American Civil War. His troops won a decisive victory in late 1864 that helped clear Tennessee of Confederates during the Franklin-Nashville Campaign.

== Biography ==
Joseph F. Knipe was born to a blacksmith and his wife in Mount Joy, Pennsylvania. As a youth, he was apprenticed to a cobbler in Philadelphia. In 1842, he left his employment and enlisted in the United States Army in the 2nd U.S. Artillery. He rose to the rank of sergeant and served in the Mexican-American War. He was discharged in 1847 and took employment with the fledgling railroad industry in Harrisburg. Later, he was involved in the mercantile business.

Knipe enrolled in the Pennsylvania state militia and became a major and aide-de-camp to Brig. Gen. Edward Williams, commander of the Dauphin County Militia. With the bombardment of Fort Sumter in April 1861 and the subsequent Federal call for troops to put down the rebellion, volunteers flocked to Harrisburg to enlist in Pennsylvania's newly commissioned regiments. Williams and Knipe selected the site for the state's new military training center, Camp Curtin. In September 1861, Governor Andrew Curtin commissioned Knipe as a colonel and authorized him to raise the 46th Pennsylvania Volunteer Infantry. After cursory training, Knipe's regiment was assigned to garrison duty at Harper's Ferry.

In the spring of 1862, Knipe fought in the Valley Campaign against Stonewall Jackson's forces. He was wounded at the First Battle of Winchester. He was again wounded at the Battle of Cedar Mountain. Due to the chain of command changes necessitated during the Battle of Antietam by the death of XII Corps commander Joseph K. Mansfield, Knipe took command of the brigade of Samuel W. Crawford in the first division. Crawford had taken command of the division when Alpheus Williams became acting corps commander.

On April 15, 1863, Knipe was promoted to brigadier general, backdated to November 1862. He led first brigade first division XII Corps under Alpheus Williams which saw action at the Battle of Chancellorsville. Suffering from lingering effects from his wounds and a bout with malaria, he temporarily left the Army of the Potomac and returned to Harrisburg. He took command of a brigade of inexperienced New York militia and led it in pursuit of the retreating Army of Northern Virginia following the Battle of Gettysburg.

Returning to his XII Corps brigade, Knipe went to the Western Theater and served in the Atlanta campaign. He took command of a division of Union cavalry during John Bell Hood's incursion into Tennessee, and captured 6,000 Confederates and eight battleflags in a decisive victory over the retreating Army of Tennessee following the Battle of Nashville.

Following the war, Knipe returned to Harrisburg, where he was appointed postmaster by President Andrew Johnson. He subsequently held a number of political patronage positions the rest of his life, both on the Federal and state levels. For a term, he was postmaster of the United States House of Representatives.

Knipe died at the age of 78 and was buried in the Harrisburg Cemetery.

== See also ==
- List of American Civil War generals (Union)

== Notes ==
Appletons' Cyclopaedia of American Biography, By James Grant Wilson and John Fiske, Volume III Grinnell-Lockwood, New York: D. Appleton and Company, 1888, pg 563
