= Sandyford, Staffordshire =

Coordinates: 53.06°N 02.22°W

Sandyford
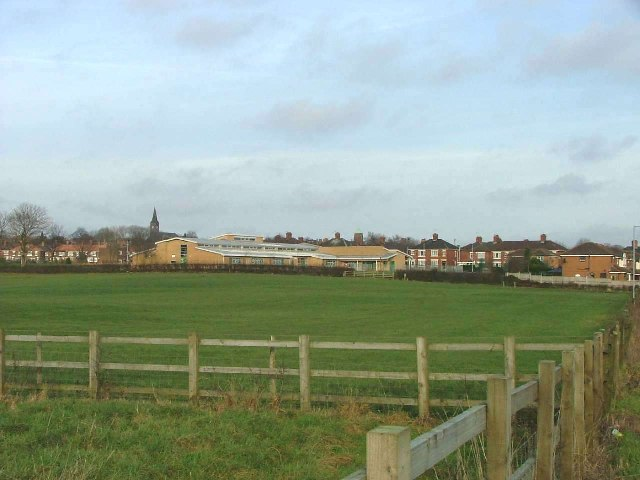
- Sandyford from Holly Wall Farm

- Location within Staffordshire
- OS grid reference: SJ8552
- District: Stoke-on-Trent
- Shire county: Staffordshire
- Region: West Midlands
- Country: England
- Sovereign state: United Kingdom
- Post town: Stoke-on-Trent
- Postcode district: ST7
- Dialling code: 01782
- Police: Staffordshire
- Fire: Staffordshire
- Ambulance: West Midlands
- UK Parliament: Stoke-on-Trent

Sandyford is a former village in Stoke-on-Trent near to Goldenhill and Tunstall. Churchill China has its large factory based in Sandyford.
