= Tunstall, Staffordshire =

One of the Six Towns of Stoke-on-Trent, in Staffordshire, England

Coordinates: 53.0583°N 2.2114°W

Tunstall
- Federated Town and District
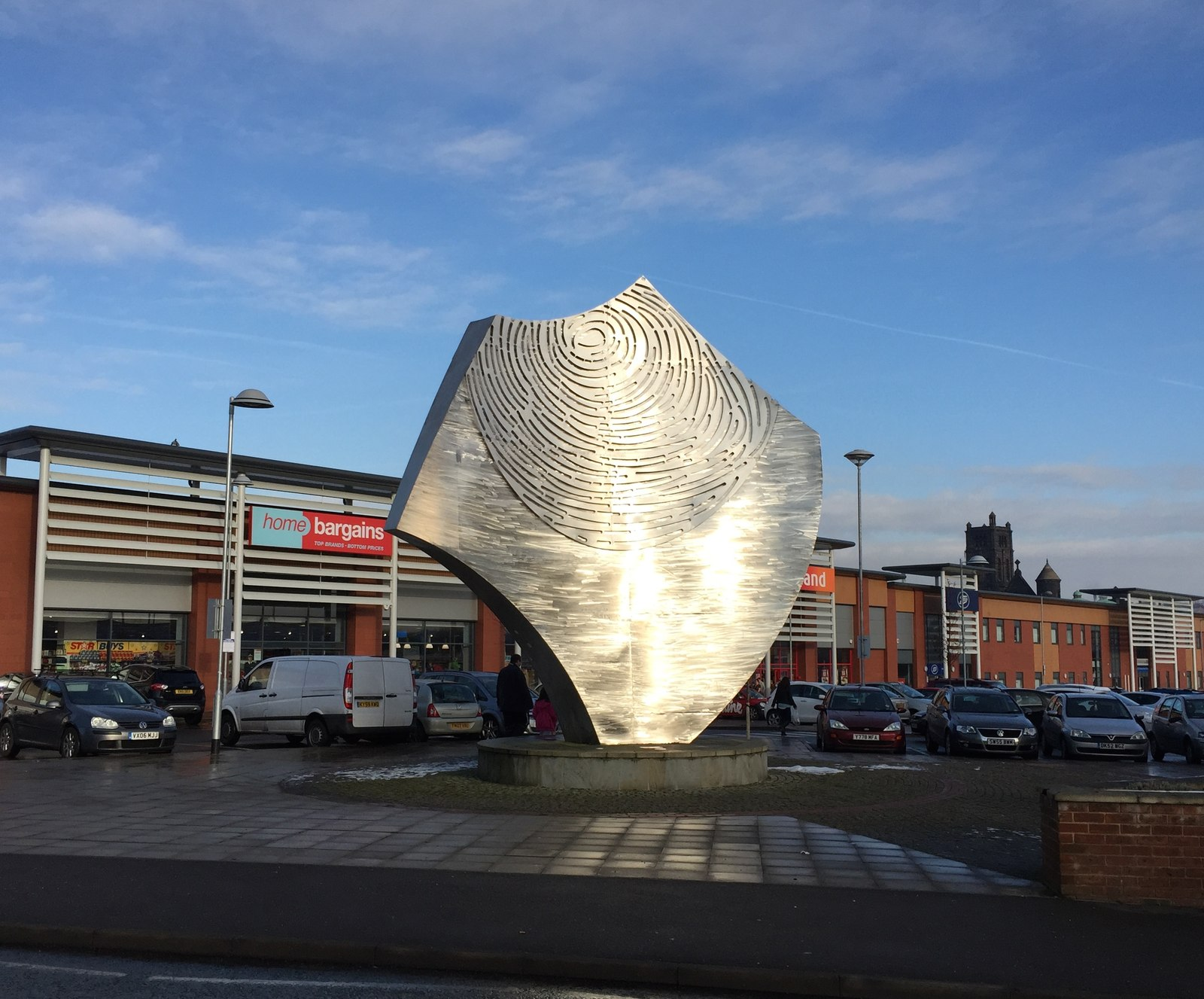
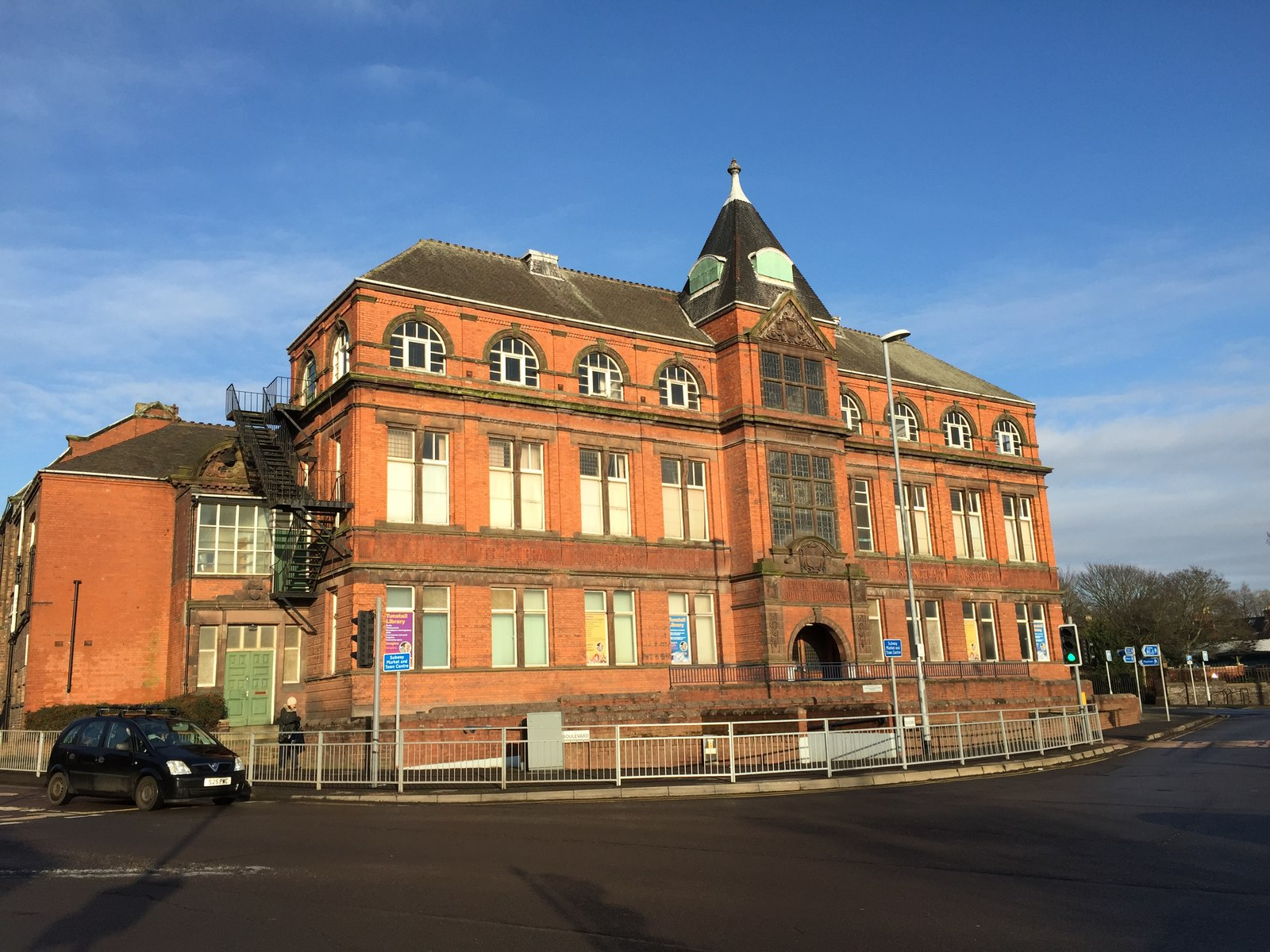
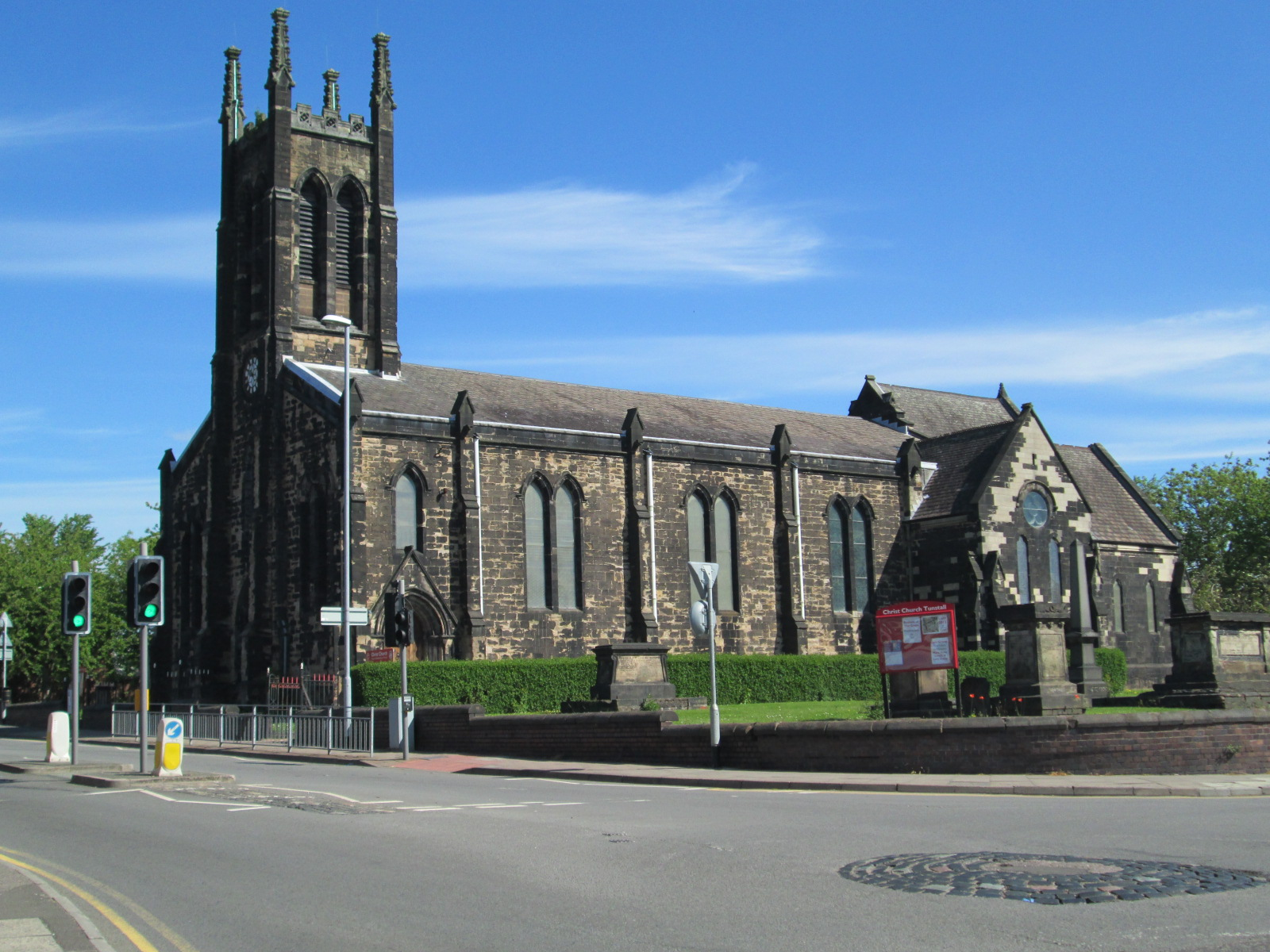
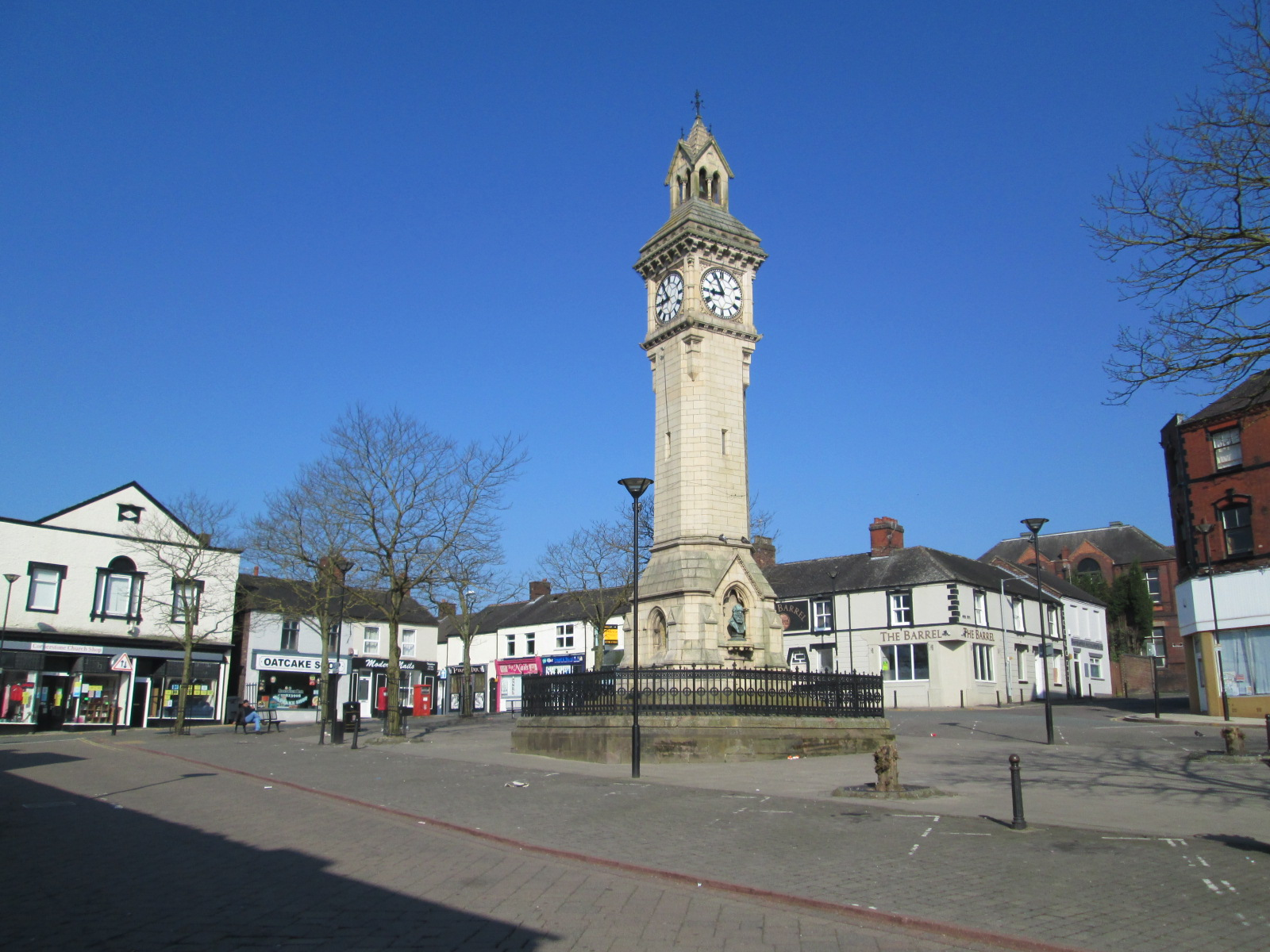
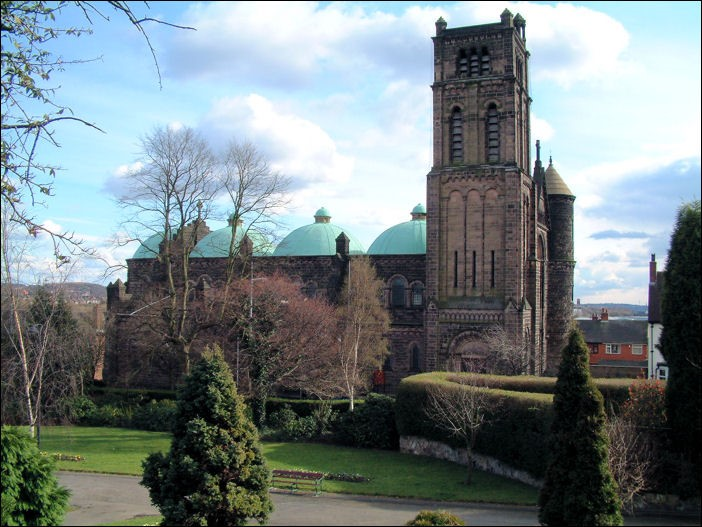
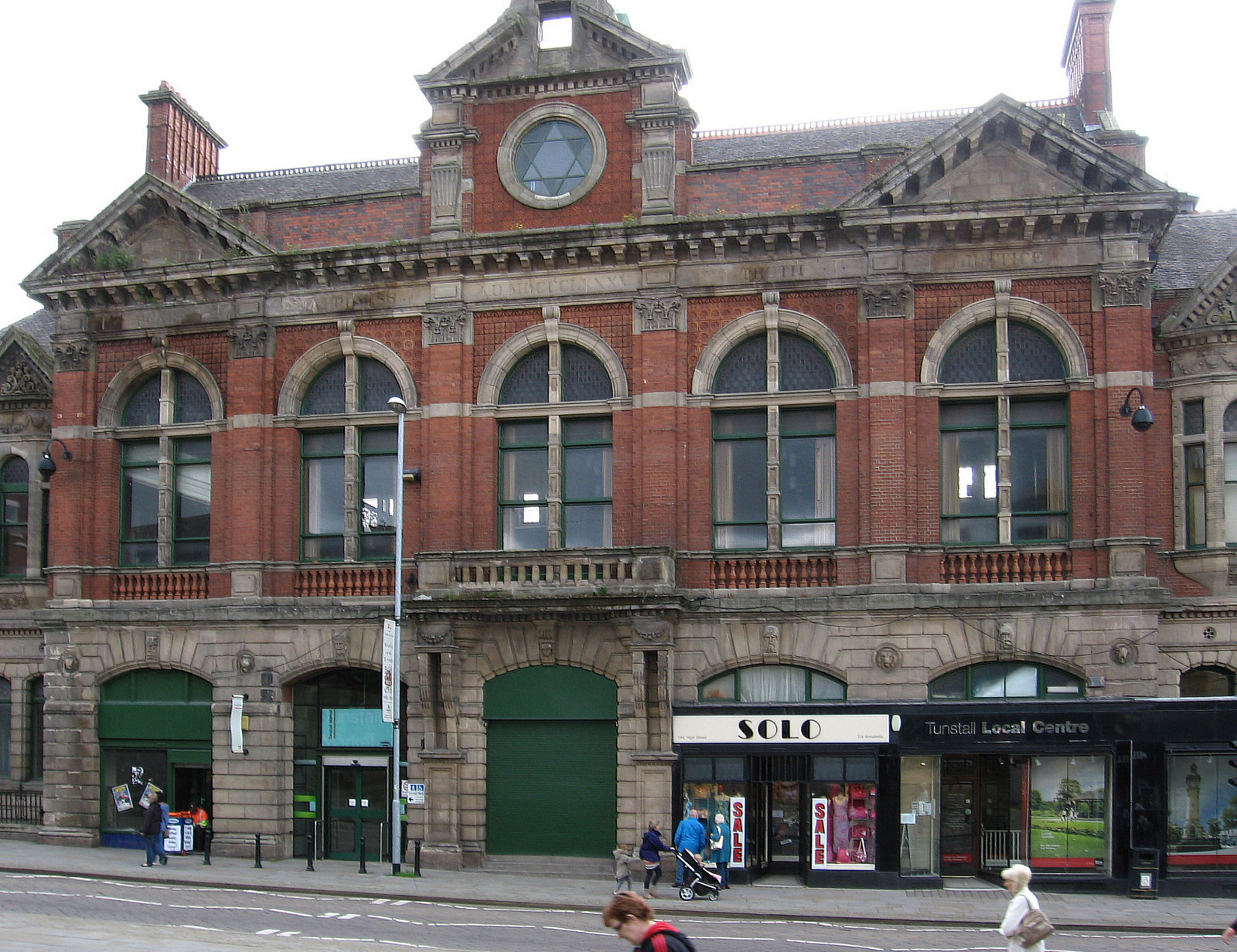
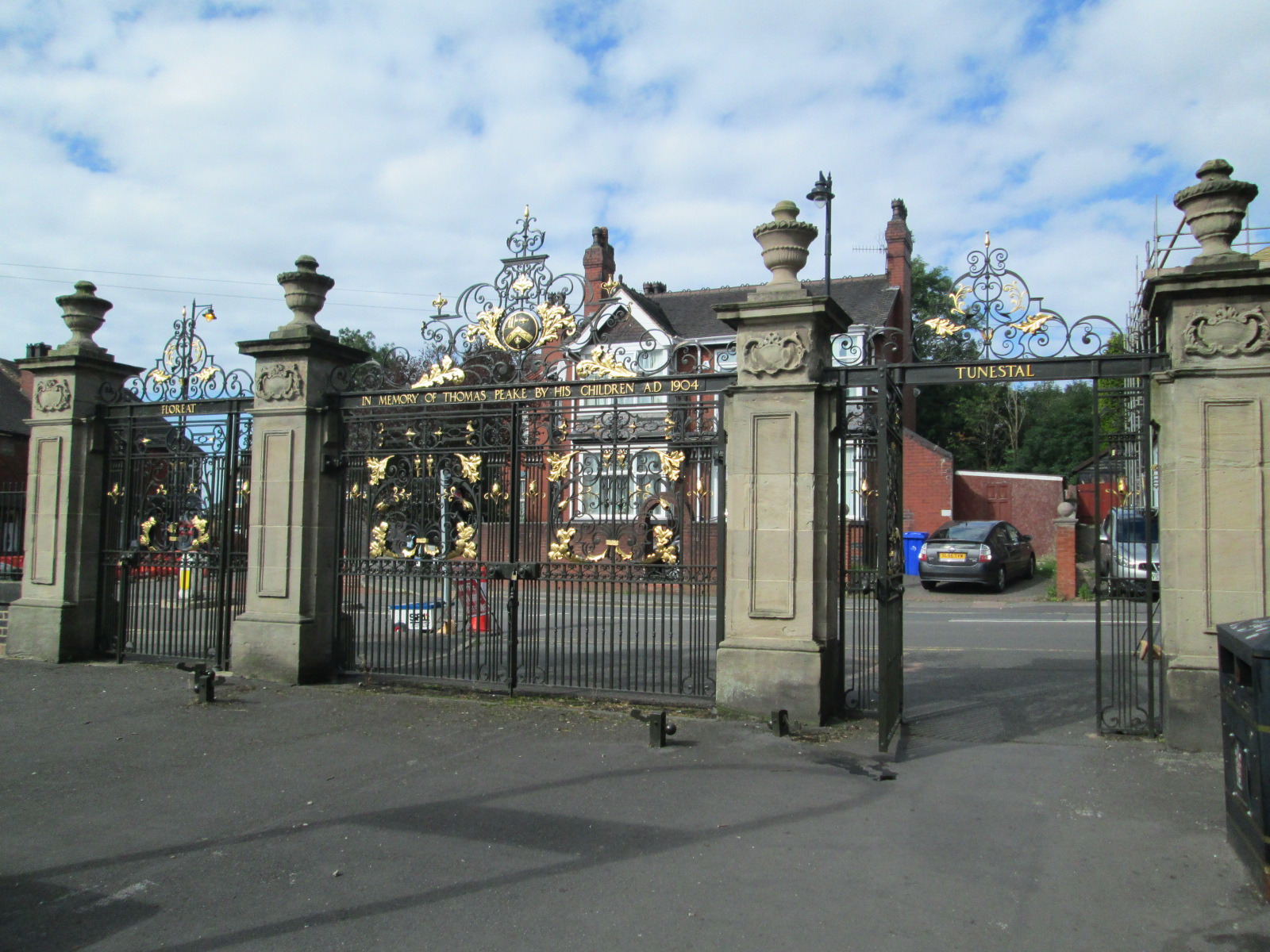
- Top: Tunstall Shard in Alexandra Park; Upper: The Public Library and Christ Church; Lower: Tower Square and the Sacred Heart Church; Bottom: Old Town Hall and Victoria Park Gates

- Location within Staffordshire
- Population: 6,559 (2021 Census)
- OS grid reference: SJ864516
- Unitary authority: Stoke-on-Trent
- Ceremonial county: Staffordshire
- Region: West Midlands
- Country: England
- Sovereign state: United Kingdom
- Districts of the town: List: Bradeley; Chell; Sandyford; Stanfields
- Post town: Stoke-on-Trent
- Postcode district: ST6
- Dialling code: 01782
- Police: Staffordshire
- Fire: Staffordshire
- Ambulance: West Midlands
- UK Parliament: Stoke-on-Trent North

Tunstall is one of the six towns that, along with Burslem, Longton, Fenton, Hanley and Stoke-upon-Trent, amalgamated to form the City of Stoke-on-Trent in Staffordshire, England. It was one of the original six towns that federated to form the city. Tunstall is the most northern, and fourth largest town of the Potteries. It is situated in the very northwest of the city borough, with its north and west boundaries being the city limit. It stands on a ridge of land between Fowlea Brook to the west and Scotia Brook to the east, surrounded by old tile-making and brick-making sites, some of which date back to the Middle Ages.

== History ==
There is no independent record of Tunstall in the Domesday Book; it is believed to have formed part of the lands of Richard the Forester, centred on Thursfield. However, Tunstall Manor quickly became powerful. Between 1212 and 1273, Tunstall, Bemersley, Burslem, Chatterley, Chell, Oldcott, and Thursfield, Whitfield and Bemersley are mentioned as distinct manors or vills; all but Chell had merged within the manor of Tunstall by the end of the 13th century. From the 16th century, Tunstall Manor covered an area which extended to the Cheshire border and included the following additional townships: Chell, Ravenscliffe, Sneyd, Brieryhurst, Stadmorslow and Wedgwood. Records mention that iron and coal were being mined and processed in the town as far back as 1282.

The appointment of a market-reeve by the manor court in 1525 is the earliest indication of a market in Tunstall manor. In 1816, a market square of nearly an acre (now Tower Square) was laid out on land called Stony Croft which was leased from the lord of the manor, and small-scale markets began to be held.

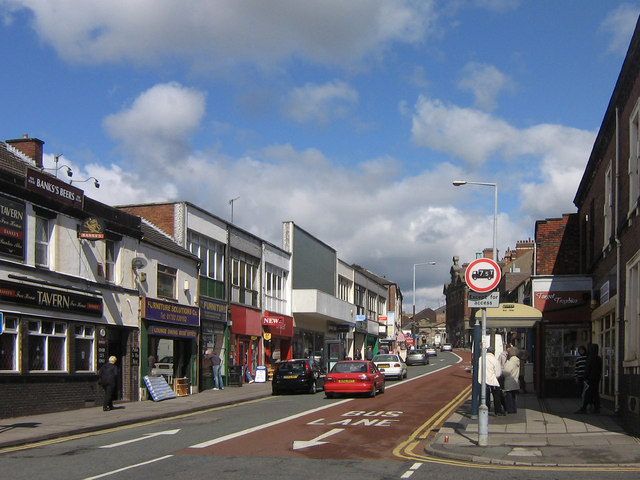
High Street, Tunstall

Tunstall remained a linear village until the industrial revolution. Tunstall's main make-up is now of rows of Victorian terraced houses, which were built during the pottery boom to house workers. There are a number of new estates that have been built in the area. Park Terrace consists of elegant Victorian and Edwardian townhouses and is a designated conservation area, as is the housing around Victoria Park.

Tunstall was historically a township and chapelry in the ancient parish of Wolstanton, on 31 December 1894 Tunstall became a civil parish. The town was also granted urban district status in 1894 and quickly set about expanding itself, acquiring amongst others Pitts Hill from Chell civil parish in 1899. On 1 April 1910, the UDC dissolved itself and the town was federated into the county borough of Stoke-on-Trent. On 1 April 1922 the parish was abolished and merged with Stoke on Trent. At the 1921 census (the last before the abolition of the parish), Tunstall had a population of 22,740. By 1925 the borough was granted city status. Tunstall has however, remained distinct and retained its own shopping and business district, adding to Stoke-on-Trent's polycentric nature.

On 27 November 1916, German Zeppelin LZ 61 (L21) bombed Tunstall during its return leg to Germany, dropping three bombs. However, it was shot down the following day before it could reach the coast at Lowestoft.

=== Trade journals and gazetteers ===
The village of Tunstall was described in 1795 as "the pleasantest village in the pottery".

"Tunstall, including its environs, is the pleasantest village in the pottery. It stands on high ground and commands pleasing prospects. The manufactories in it are respectable and do considerable business. There are a number of brick and tile works here; the clay being of a superior kind for such articles; so that with good management the tiles made from it look as well as moderate slate. The Methodists have a large neat Chapel in this place. which is well attended. They have lately established a Sunday School, supported by voluntary contributions, and the teachers give their labours gratis."

— J. Allbut, The Staffordshire Potteries (1802)

"TUNSTALL is a considerable village within the township of Tunstall Court, a liberty in the parish of Woolstanton, four miles from Newcastle, pleasantly situated on an eminence, deriving its name from the Saxon word, tun or ton, a town, and stall, an elevated place, seat or station." "In this township abounds coal, ironstone, marl and fine cannel coal; and the manufactories of earthenware are very extensive here."

— 1828 journal

"Tunstall.— town with ry. sta., Wolstanton par., Staffordshire, on the Grand Trunk Canal, 2½ miles NE. and within the parliamentary limits of Newcastle under Lyme, 690 ac., pop. 14,244; P.O., T.O., 3 Banks. Tunstall shares in the industries of the Potteries. It has rapidly risen from a village to a considerable town, with a fine town hall in the centre of a spacious market-place."

— John Bartholomew, Gazetteer of the British Isles (1887)

== Potters ==
There is evidence of small-scale pottery manufacturing in Tunstall from the 14th century. However, Tunstall was one of the last of towns in the Potteries to begin large scale pottery manufacturing, with the main focus being on farming, and to a lesser extent, coal & iron mining and mills. Thus Tunstall was not affected by the 1842 Pottery Riots. However, Tunstall still has a rich industrial heritage. At the start of the 19th century there were 3 pottery works in the town, by the close of the century that number had risen to 13. Famous potters located in the town have been the Adams dynasty of potters founded by William Adams, as well as Alfred Meakin, Booths founded by Enoch Booth and Enoch Wedgwood, and W H Grindley founded in 1880 by William Harry Grindley. Robert Beswick, father of Beswick Pottery founder James Wright Beswick, began making pottery in Tunstall. Jabez Vodrey is a noted emigrant potter, the first English potter west of the Appalachian Mountains. Clarice Cliff (20 January 1899 – 23 October 1972) was an English ceramic industrial artist active from 1922 to 1963. Charles Shaw was a 19th-century potter whose in-depth autobiography has given some of the clearest insights into the Victorian Potteries, and provided Arnold Bennett with inspiration for his Clayhanger novels. Tunstall became widely known for its tiles, regarded to be as good as slate. Decorative ceramic tiles are still made in Tunstall by H and R Johnson-Richards Tiles.

== Transport ==
Tunstall's industries were served by the Trent and Mersey Canal, constructed over 11 years from 1766. The canal was designed by James Brindley, a resident of Turnhurst Hall in nearby Chell. Just north of Tunstall lies one of Brindley's greatest achievements, the Harecastle Tunnel, which takes the Trent and Mersey Canal underneath Goldenhill. Barges were 'legged' through by men lying on their backs on top of the barges and pushing against the roof with their feet. This was physically demanding and slow, causing major delays, so in 1827 leading civil engineer Thomas Telford was commissioned to provide a second, and wider, parallel tunnel with a towpath. Today the Harecastle Tunnels are the fourth longest canal tunnels in the UK.

Tunstall was served by a railway station, which was opened by the North Staffordshire Railway on 1 December 1873. This closed under the Beeching Axe in 1965 with the removal of the Potteries Loop Line. Today Tunstall lies roughly equidistant between Longport and Kidsgrove railway stations on the Stafford to Manchester Line, a branch of the West Coast Main Line (Network Rail Route 18). There are also direct services to Crewe and Derby. It is also well served by buses provided by: Baker Coaches, Clowes Coaches, D&G Coaches, Wardle Transport and First Potteries, connecting Tunstall to all surrounding settlements.

The A50 is the main arterial route through Tunstall, running from Warrington to Leicester via Stoke and Derby. Tunstall is linked to the A500 "D-road", which passes just west of the town, by the new A527 linkway the town connecting Tunstall and the rest of Stoke-on-Trent to the M6 motorway. Slightly further east the A34 runs north–south, towards Manchester and Newcastle-under-Lyme respectively.

== Geography ==
=== Climate ===
Climate in this area has mild differences between highs and lows, and there is adequate rainfall year-round. The Köppen Climate Classification subtype for this climate is "Cfb". (Marine West Coast Climate).

Climate data for Tunstall, Staffordshire
Month	Jan	Feb	Mar	Apr	May	Jun	Jul	Aug	Sep	Oct	Nov	Dec	Year
Mean daily maximum °C (°F)	5 (41)	5 (41)	8 (46)	11 (51)	15 (59)	18 (64)	20 (68)	20 (68)	17 (62)	14 (57)	9 (48)	7 (44)	12 (53)
Mean daily minimum °C (°F)	0 (32)	1 (33)	2 (35)	4 (39)	7 (44)	10 (50)	11 (51)	12 (53)	10 (50)	7 (44)	4 (39)	2 (35)	5 (41)
Average precipitation cm (inches)	5.1 (2)	3.6 (1.4)	4.1 (1.6)	3.3 (1.3)	3.6 (1.4)	4.6 (1.8)	4.8 (1.9)	6.6 (2.6)	4.8 (1.9)	5.6 (2.2)	6.1 (2.4)	5.8 (2.3)	58 (22.7)
Source: Weatherbase

== Other information ==
The outskirts of Tunstall became home to a new public art statue called Golden in 2015. The 69 ft (21 m) steel work of art by Wolfgang Buttress was privately funded with £180,000 Section 106 monies secured during the construction of the Blue Planet eco-warehouse.

The Phoenix Trust, an independent not-for-profit foundation, is campaigning to turn Tunstall and the wider North Staffordshire Coalfield into a World Heritage Site due to its historic economic significance, leading role in the industrial revolution and status as the birthplace of Primitive Methodism.

Tunstall has had a rise in well-known shops in recent years, notably with the construction of Alexandra Retail Park. These developments have, however, been felt to be to the detriment of Tunstall's traditional town centre shops and market. The town's shops got together in 2003–4 to buy a good amount of Christmas décor and now it is popular to go and watch Tunstall lights have their grand switch on.

A recognisable Tunstall, renamed Turnhill, features in the novels of Arnold Bennett.

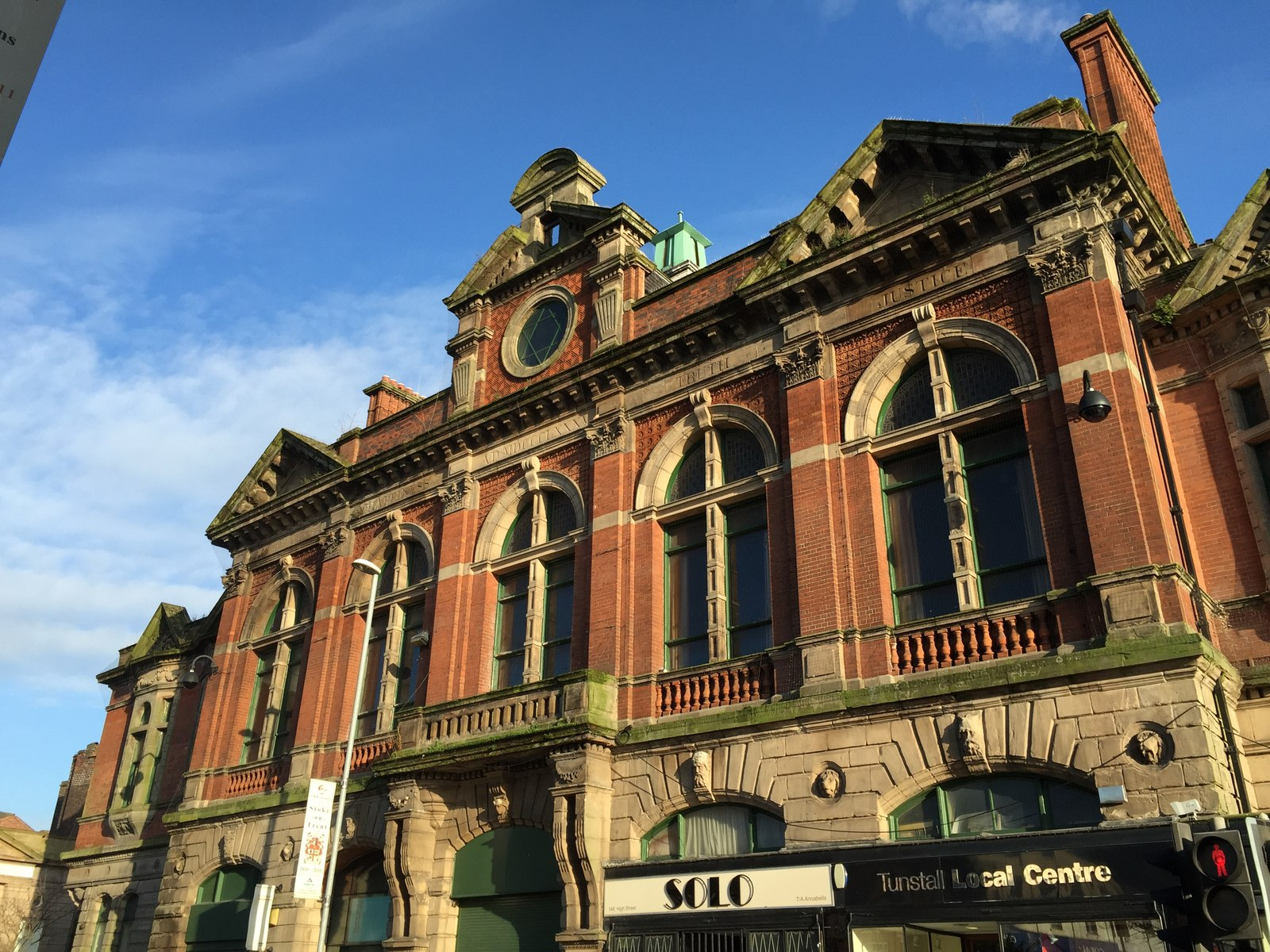
Tunstall Town Hall

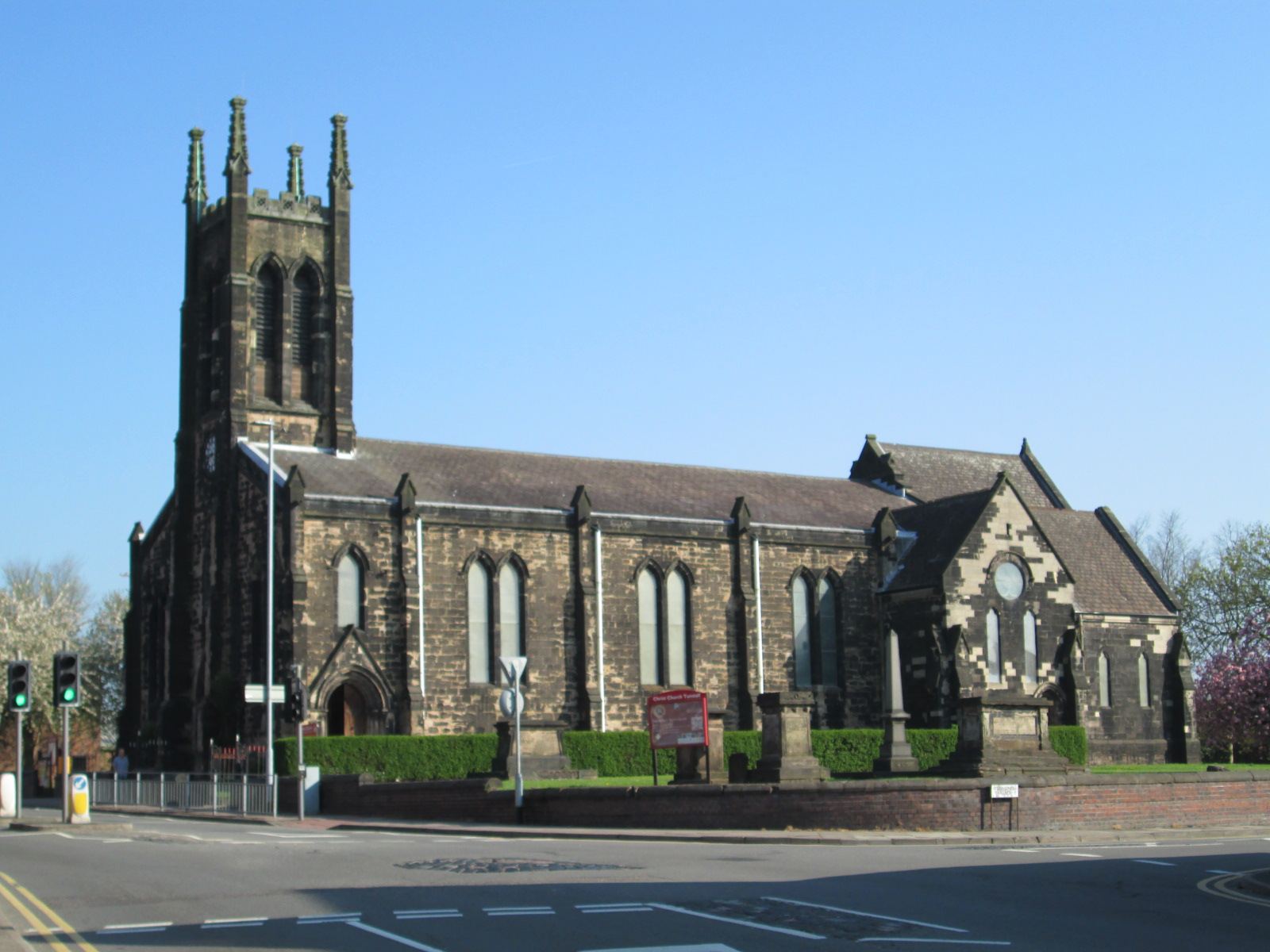
Christ Church, Tunstall

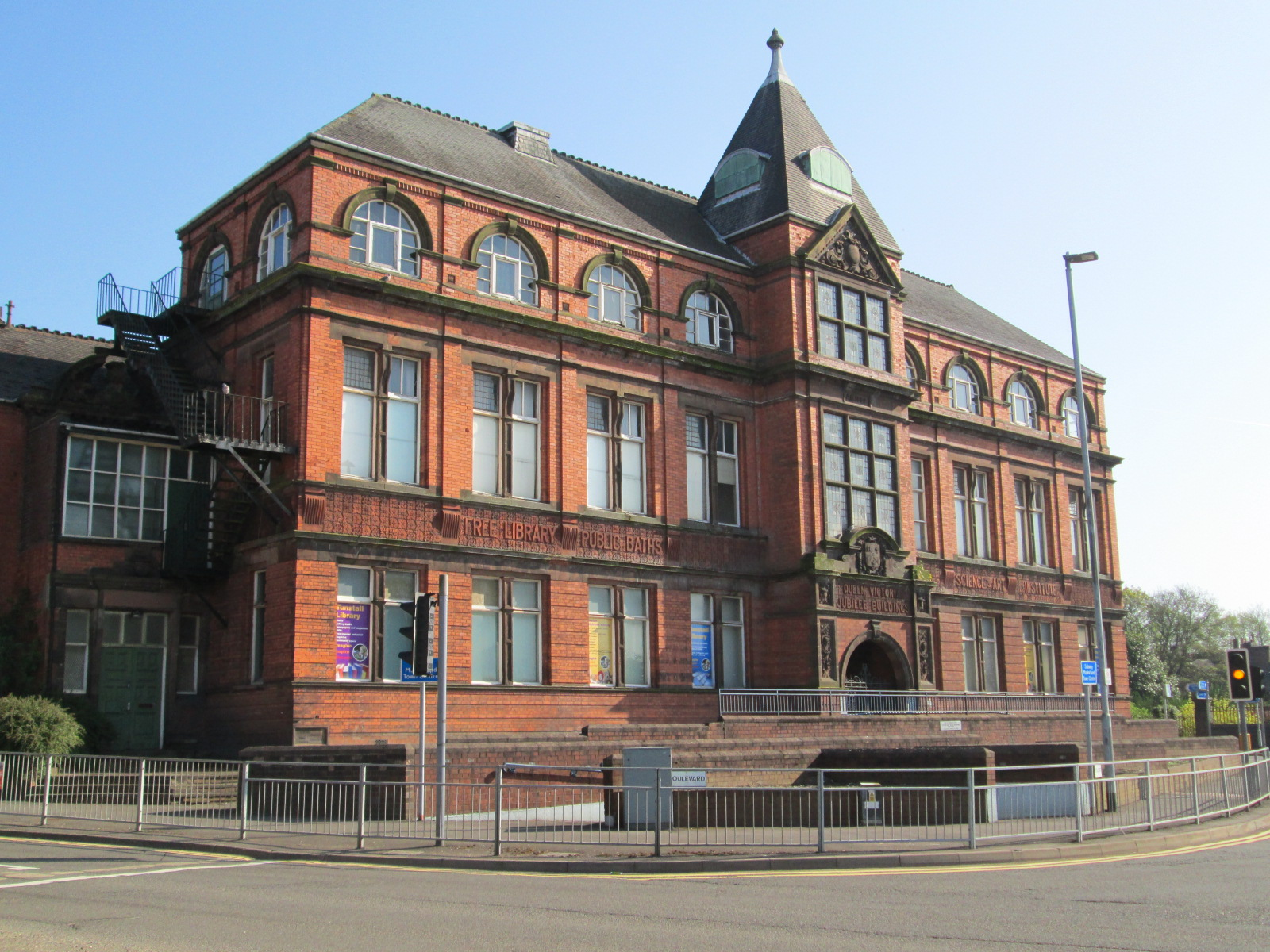
Tunstall library and public baths

There are a number of Grade II listed buildings in Tunstall, notably: Tunstall Market Hall, Tunstall Town Hall, Christ Church, Church of the Sacred Heart, the world's first Primitive Methodist chapel, the clock tower in Tower Square, Tunstall library and public baths, Victoria Park and structures, and the lodge and canal portals at Harecastle Tunnel. There are also three conservation areas: Tower Square, Park Terrace and Victoria Park & surrounding housing.

By the closing years of the 19th century, most urban areas in the UK were suffering from pollution and poor health. To this end Tunstall Urban district began a series of improvements works shortly after its foundation, including the Victoria Public Baths- which opened in 1897. In this year, work commenced on Victoria Park, also known as Tunstall Park. The park was devised by the council's architect Absalom Reade Wood (1851–1922). By 1914 the park had largely taken its present form, covering 21 acres. It is now Grade II listed. Tunstall Victoria Park Trust, a registered charity, was founded in 2009 to engage the public and help decide how the money donated by the Reginald Johnson Foundation for improving the park should be used.

The Golden Torch, on Hose Street, was a famous Northern Soul club, founded by Christopher Burton, a contemporary of Ivor Abadi (founder of the Twisted Wheel club), and Russ Winstanley of the famous Wigan Casino. It opened on 30 January 1965 with the headline act of Billy J. Kramer and the Dakotas. Initially a mod club, it did not begin regular soul nights until 1969. It played host to DJs such as Peter Stringfellow. Following the closure of Manchester's Twisted Wheel soul club, in 1971 The Torch began putting on its own Soul All-Nighters. However, it became a victim of its own success, with regular police presences, drug taking and overcrowding. When the club came to renew its licence on 16 March 1973 Stoke-on-Trent council refused the renewal, without a licence the club simply fizzled out, paving the way for the Wigan Casino.

The Tunstall Wakes were held on the first Sunday after the feast of St. Margaret (20 July), the saint to whom Wolstanton church is dedicated. The wakes were abolished in 1879, but soon revived by popular demand.

Tunstall was home to the independent Frink School of Figurative Sculpture, which occupied a fine old factory (and former Old Court) in Roundwell Street for a number of years until about 2004. The Frink School was named after British sculptor Elisabeth Frink and was a small intimate academy with a specific discipline of study closer in spirit to a master and apprentice structure than an educational institution. This has since moved to nearby Leek.

Today, the area is served by many primary schools, and secondary schools include Co-op Academy Stoke-on-Trent, Ormiston Horizon Academy and St Margaret Ward Catholic Academy.

== Regeneration ==
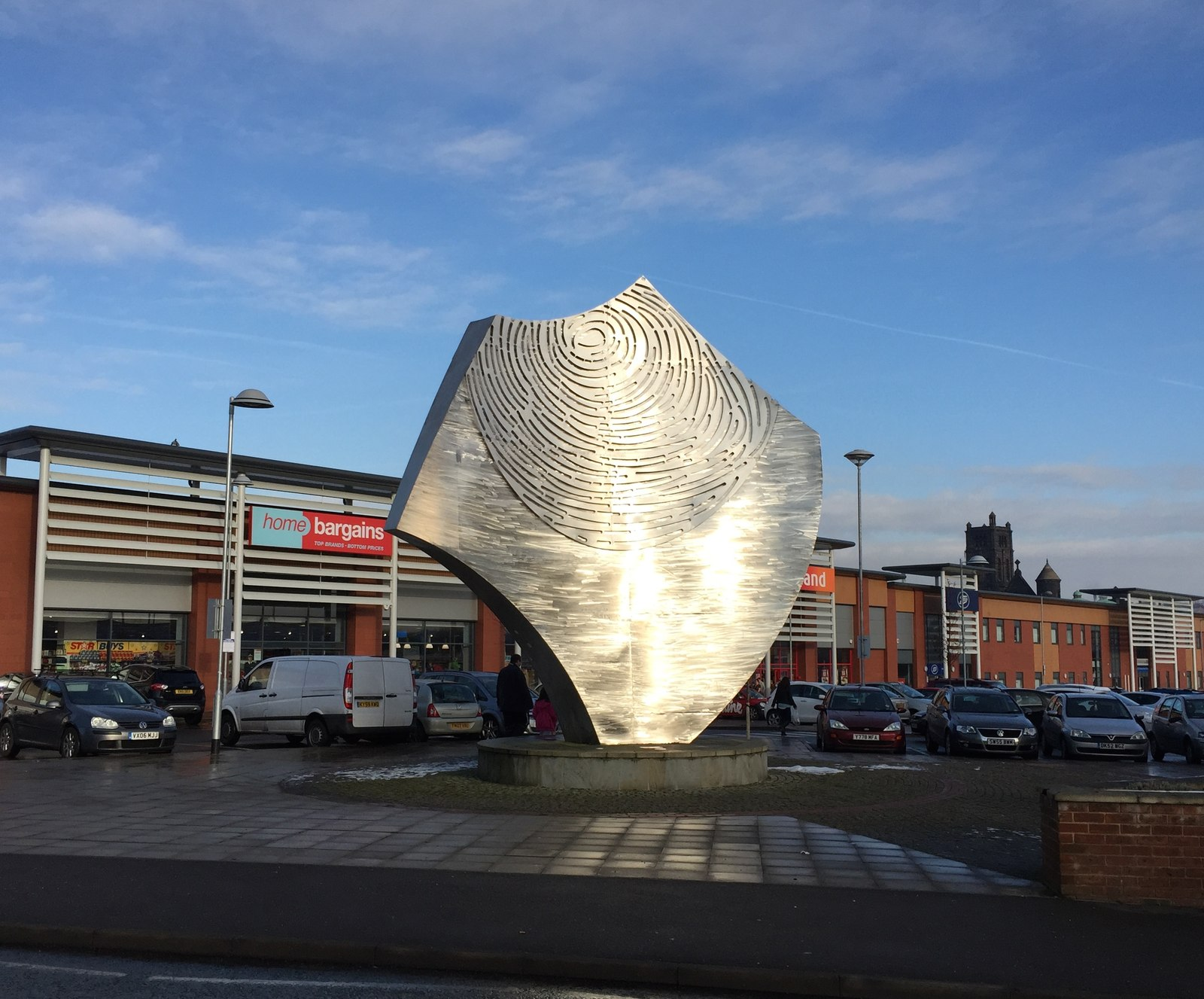
"The Shard" by Robert Erskine

Dransfield created Jasper Square which is occupied by stores including Poundland, Argos and Matalan. The company later began construction on a project called Alexandra Park adjacent to the previous project. The final phase of development was completed in February 2014 and added Home Bargains, Iceland and Card Factory. The park contains "The Shard", a stainless steel sculpture celebrating the area's historic pottery industry. It was created by Robert Erskine. In 2014, long-term plans for another retail park and Morrisons supermarket were cancelled.

The landmark HSBC bank on the high street was bought over by digital marketing agency Netinspire and insolvency practitioner Dunion & Co. The 1920s period property was fully refurbished, while retaining the building's original exterior, to house Netinspire and Dunion & Co's modern offices. In 2020, the building was purchased by Gateway Psychology, a private psychological service for children, young people and families. Gateway Psychology are based on The Boulevard pedestrian walkway, adjacent to the old bank. The psychology service has undertaken an extensive renovation project, reusing and renovating as many original features as possible (like the original parquet blocks discovered under the carpeting). The old bank is currently used as office and therapy space for staff and clients, with a doorway to connect the bank to the therapeutic facility next door.

== Notable residents ==
- William Adams (1746–1805) was a maker of fine jasperware.
- Hugh Bourne (1772–1852) was the joint founder of Primitive Methodism.
- Jabez Vodrey (1795–1861) first English potter west of the Appalachian Mountains.
- Enoch Wedgwood (1813–1879) English potter, founder in 1860 of the pottery firm Wedgwood & Co.
- Charles Shaw (1832–1906) potter whose autobiography provided insight into the Victorian Potteries and Tunstall.
- William Harold Coltman (1891–1974) Victoria Cross recipient highly decorated British soldier
- Clarice Cliff (1899–1972) a famous ceramic artist was born in the town.
- Susie Cooper (1902–1995), ceramic artist & designer.
- Muriel Pemberton (1909-1993), fashion designer, painter and academic, born in Tunstall
- Wilfred Lewis Warren (1929–1994) historian of medieval England.
- Leslie Hulme, known as Ken Barrie (1933–2016) was the voice of Postman Pat
- Robbie Williams, (born 1974) is famous pop star, grew up in Tunstall, educated in nearby Chell.

=== Sport ===
- Jimmy Yates (1869–1922) English professional footballer, 163 appearances
- John "Jack" Farrell (1873–1947) professional footballer, 162 appearances
- Henry "Harry" O'Grady (1907–1990) professional English footballer, 99 appearances
- Selwyn Davies Whalley (1934–2008) former English footballer, 178 appearances for Port Vale F.C.
- Martin Paterson, (born 1987) professional footballer in the US, was born in the town.
