= Jabez Vodrey =

English-American potter (1795–1861)

Jabez Vodrey (1795–1861) is generally thought to be the first English potter to emigrate to and work west of the Appalachian Mountains in the United States.

== Early years ==
Vodrey was born on 14 January 1795 in Tunstall, Staffordshire, a centuries-old centre of the English pottery industry. He is thought to be a cousin of Frederick Vodrey, who emigrated from Staffordshire to Dublin, Ireland in the late 19th century and founded an art pottery.

== Emigration and first American potteries ==
In 1827, Vodrey and his wife, Sarah Nixon Vodrey, emigrated to Pittsburgh, Pennsylvania, United States, with another Staffordshire potter, William Frost. Vodrey and Frost operated a pottery in Pittsburgh for about two years. In 1829, Vodrey moved alone to Louisville, Kentucky, where he continued to work as a potter for the next decade. In 1839, he moved to Troy, Indiana on the Ohio River, where he took over the operation of the abandoned pottery of James Clews. It was not a success, as skilled labour was almost impossible to procure.

== Years in East Liverpool, Ohio ==
In March 1847, Vodrey came to East Liverpool, Ohio, where he found work in the area's booming pottery industry. He began with the manufacture of clay smoking pipes, and by 1848 had formed a partnership with William Woodward, a wealthy farmer. Together, the two men produced simple yellow ware and Rockingham Pottery. Within months, their small pottery was destroyed by fire, but the men began to rebuild the pottery with the financial backing of brothers James and John Simpson Blakely.

The new pottery of Woodward, Blakely and Company called its ware Phoenix, in honor of their success in rising from the ashes of the pottery Woodward and Vodrey had founded together. By 1852, the company employed more than six dozen workers in five buildings. A series of serious setbacks, including an Ohio River flood and a strike, decimated the business and by the end of 1857, it was essentially defunct.

Meanwhile, Vodrey's sons William, James and John were busy converting an abandoned East Liverpool church into a pottery. By the spring of 1858, the Vodrey and Brother Pottery Company was operating at full capacity, producing Rockingham and yellow ware. The pottery operated under various names until its eventual permanent closure in 1928.

== Later life ==
Jabez Vodrey died in 1861. His son John Wadsworth Vodrey was killed in the Battle of New Hope Church, Georgia while fighting for the Union Army's 46th Pennsylvania Infantry on 25 May 1864. Despite these setbacks, the family pottery prospered for an additional six decades. In 1876, the pottery began production of white ironstone. In 1896, it changed its name to the Vodrey Pottery Company and semi-porcelain became part of its range. Until it closed in 1928, Vodrey Pottery produced domestic and commercial dinnerware and chamber ware. Thus ended a hundred and one years of Vodrey pottery production in the United States, of which most were in what became the nation's pottery capital: East Liverpool, Ohio.

Vodrey and his wife, Sarah Nixon Vodrey, are buried at East Liverpool's Riverview Cemetery. Descendants of the Vodrey family remain in the area.
