= Frederick Vodrey =

Frederick Vodrey (1845 - 1897) was an English businessman from Wolstanton, Staffordshire who emigrated to Ireland sometime in the late 19th century. He is thought to be a cousin of Jabez Vodrey, a potter who emigrated from Staffordshire to the United States in 1827. On 9th November 1891, Frederick Vodrey married Annie Margaret Cuthbert in the Presbyterian Church in Bray, County Wicklow, Ireland. They had three children: Frederick Cuthbert Vodrey, Eileen Evelyn Vodrey and Harold Robert Vodrey.

== Dublin pottery ==
Beginning in 1872, Vodrey operated Vodrey Pottery in Dublin and sold his ware at a nearby storefront. The pottery's output were art wares: ewers, vases, jardinieres and so on.

Despite having been raised around the rich English pottery tradition of the Staffordshire area, Vodrey had no particular training as a potter. Instead, he was an astute businessman who was skilled at cultivating talented artists and designers. Vodrey's pottery offered a wide array of goods, ranging from very plain to very fine, thus ensuring that customers of all income levels could afford his ware.

Vodrey was friendly with a number of artists from the Dublin Painting & Sketching Club, and often gave its members blanks (undecorated, unglazed pieces) so that they could decorate the pieces themselves. These finished products—often whimsically, exuberantly decorated in the Art Nouveau style—were then sold in Vodrey's store.

== Acclaim for his work ==
Vodrian art wares first came to wide public notice at the 1882 Dublin Exhibition, where they earned a merit award. The Exhibition had been launched with the specific intent of drawing attention to, and nurturing, Ireland's "home industries and manufactures." Vodrey capitalized on this interest by advertising that his wares were produced using only Irish clays.

Vodrian pieces were simple in form and were particularly praised for their rich, highly-pigmented glazes. The pottery's striking red glaze in particular won admiring comparisons to traditional Chinese oxblood glaze. Many of Vodrey's pieces bore clear Celtic and Gaelic design influence. Others echoed Arabic and Classical design.

Vodrey is generally acknowledged as a leader in this era's resurgence of interest and pride in Irish arts and crafts. Dublin's National Museum of Ireland has dozens of Vodrey's pieces on permanent display at the Decorative Arts & History facility at Collins Barracks.
