= Queen's Theatre, Burslem =

Music venue and theatre in Stoke-on-Trent, England

Queen's Theatre
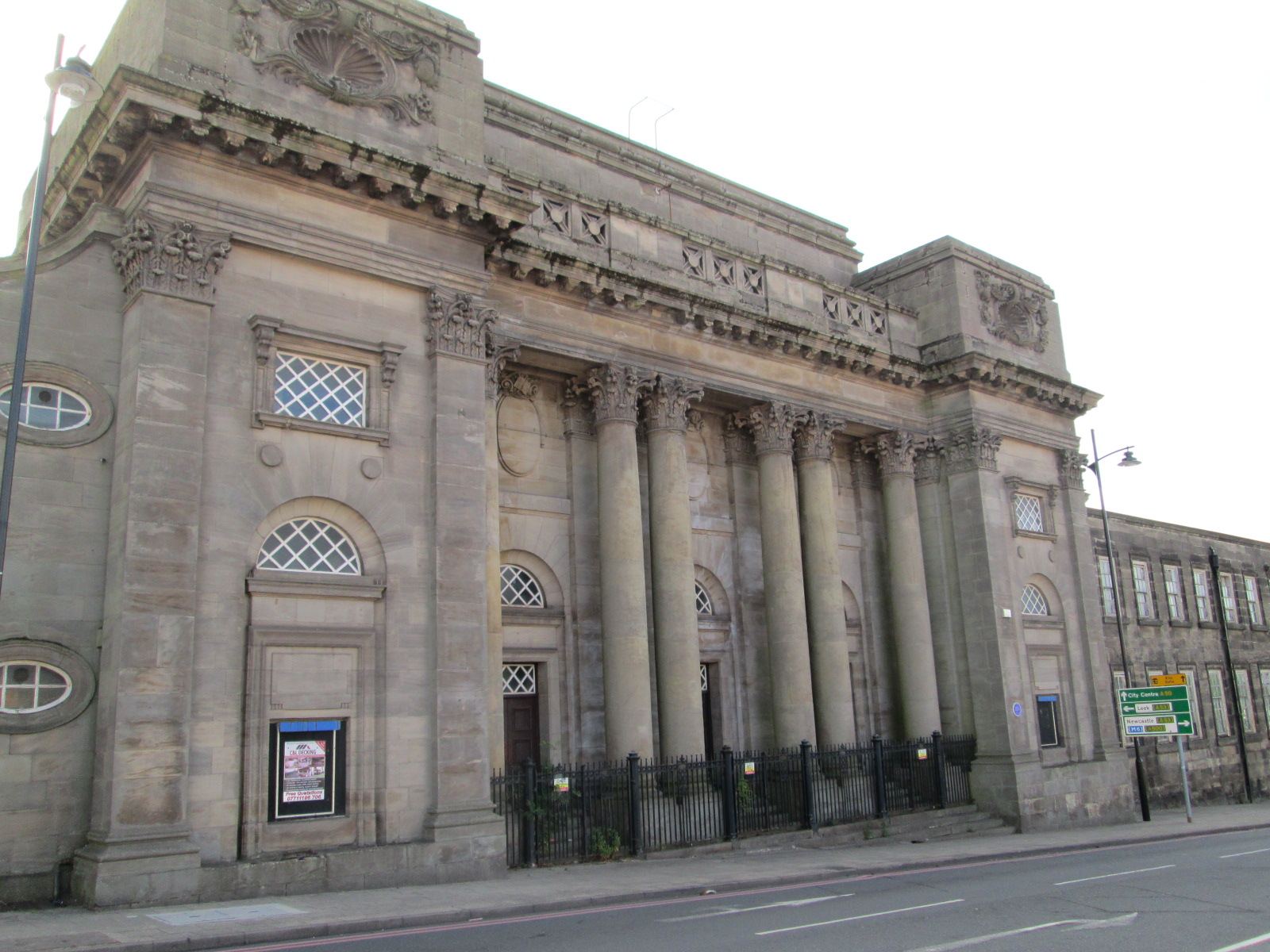
- The theatre in 2023
- Interactive map of Queen's Theatre

General information
- Status: Grade II listed
- Location: Burslem grid reference SJ 869 499, Wedgwood Street; Burslem, Staffordshire, United Kingdom
- Coordinates: 53°2′48″N 2°11′48″W
- Completed: 1911

Design and construction
- Architects: Russell and Cooper

The Queen's Theatre (originally Queen's Hall) is a theatre building in Burslem, Stoke-on-Trent, England. It is situated in Wedgwood Street in the town centre.

It is a Grade II listed building, listed on 19 April 1972.

== History ==
It was commissioned as Burslem's town hall, to replace the town hall built in the 1850s, and was built by the architects Russell and Cooper. Completed in 1911, after the Federation of Stoke-on-Trent in 1910 made its original purpose obsolete, the building was opened as the Queen's Theatre, a venue for drama, concerts and other entertainments.

Requiring repairs, the theatre closed in 1998. From 2003 events occasionally took place; it closed again in 2014.

== Architecture ==
The front, faced with ashlar, has a portico of full height with three pairs of Corinthian columns and an entablature above; there is a windowless attic storey above this. There is a large doorway between each pair of columns.

To the right of the main frontage is a wing of the building, of two storeys, with ten windows on each storey and an entrance. It is supposed that this part, being less ornate, was created after it was known that the building was no longer intended as a town hall.

The foyer has a white marble staircase at each end. The auditorium has a rear and side balconies, and a ceiling with decorative plasterwork and large Art Deco lamps.

== Restoration plans ==
A memorandum of understanding was signed in December 2025 between Stoke-on-Trent City Council and IFK Legacy Community Interest Company (CIC). The IFK Legacy CIC, established to celebrate the life and impact of the rock musician Lemmy Kilmister, particularly in his home town of Burslem, unveiled a statue of Kilmister near the theatre in May 2025. The memorandum relates to plans to restore the theatre as a music and arts venue serving the community. Councillor Jane Ashworth, leader of Stoke-on-Trent City Council, said: "This agreement means we can explore ways to give Burslem a music and arts venue while breathing new life into one of the most important buildings in Burslem's Conservation Area."
