= Burslem =

Town in Staffordshire, England

Coordinates: 53°2′44″N 2°11′53″W

Burslem: The Mother Town of the Potteries
- Federated town and district
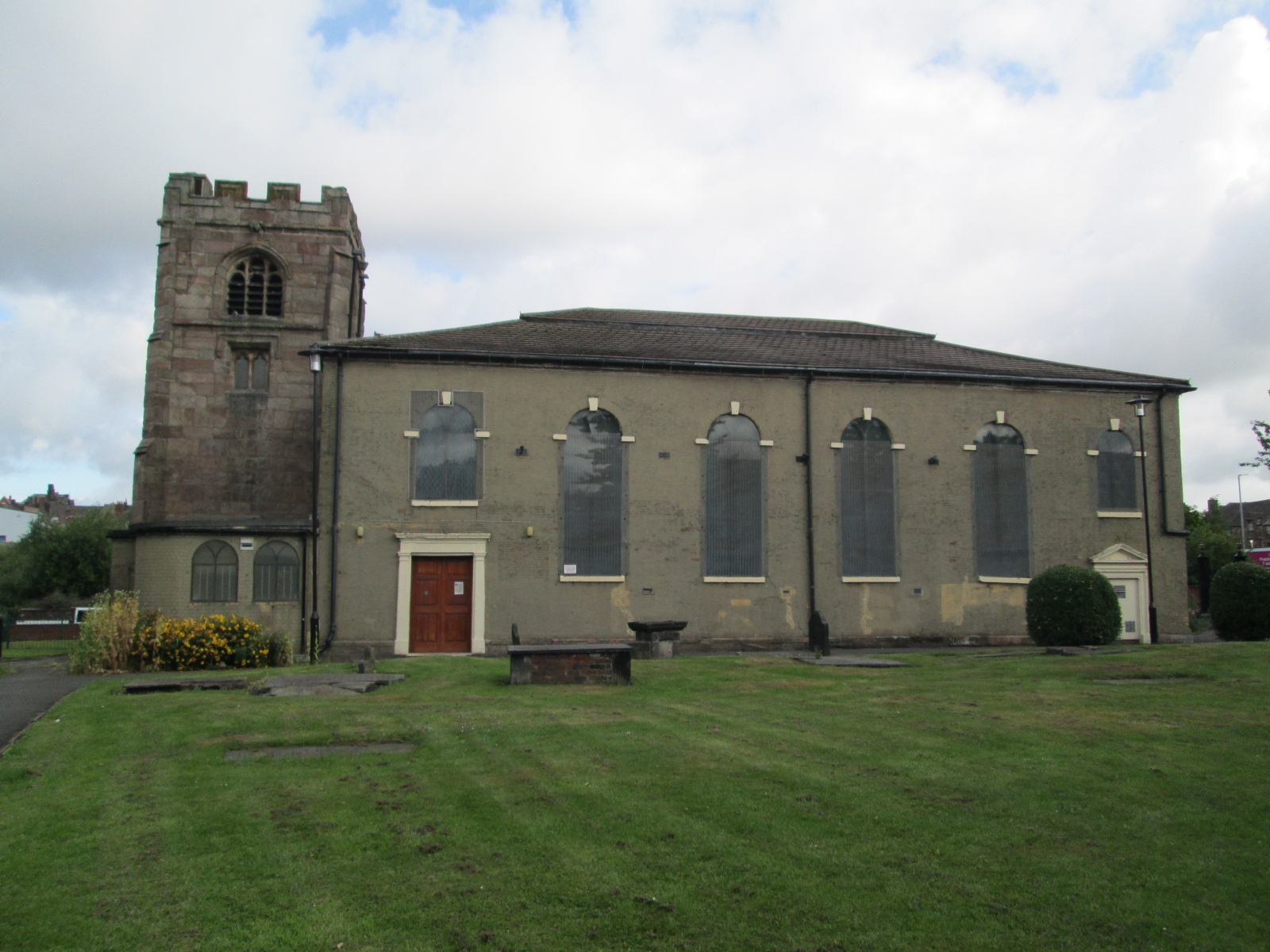
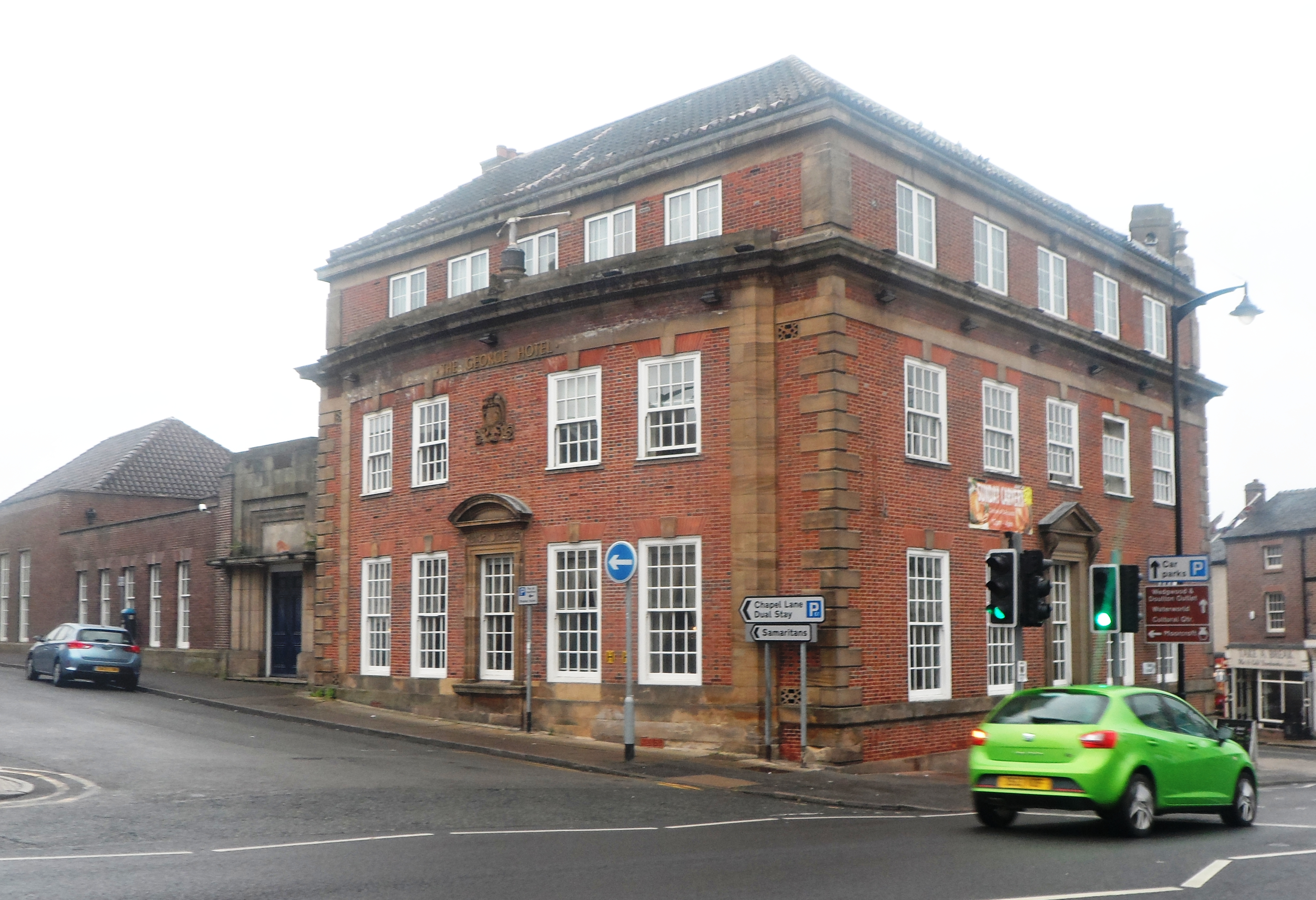
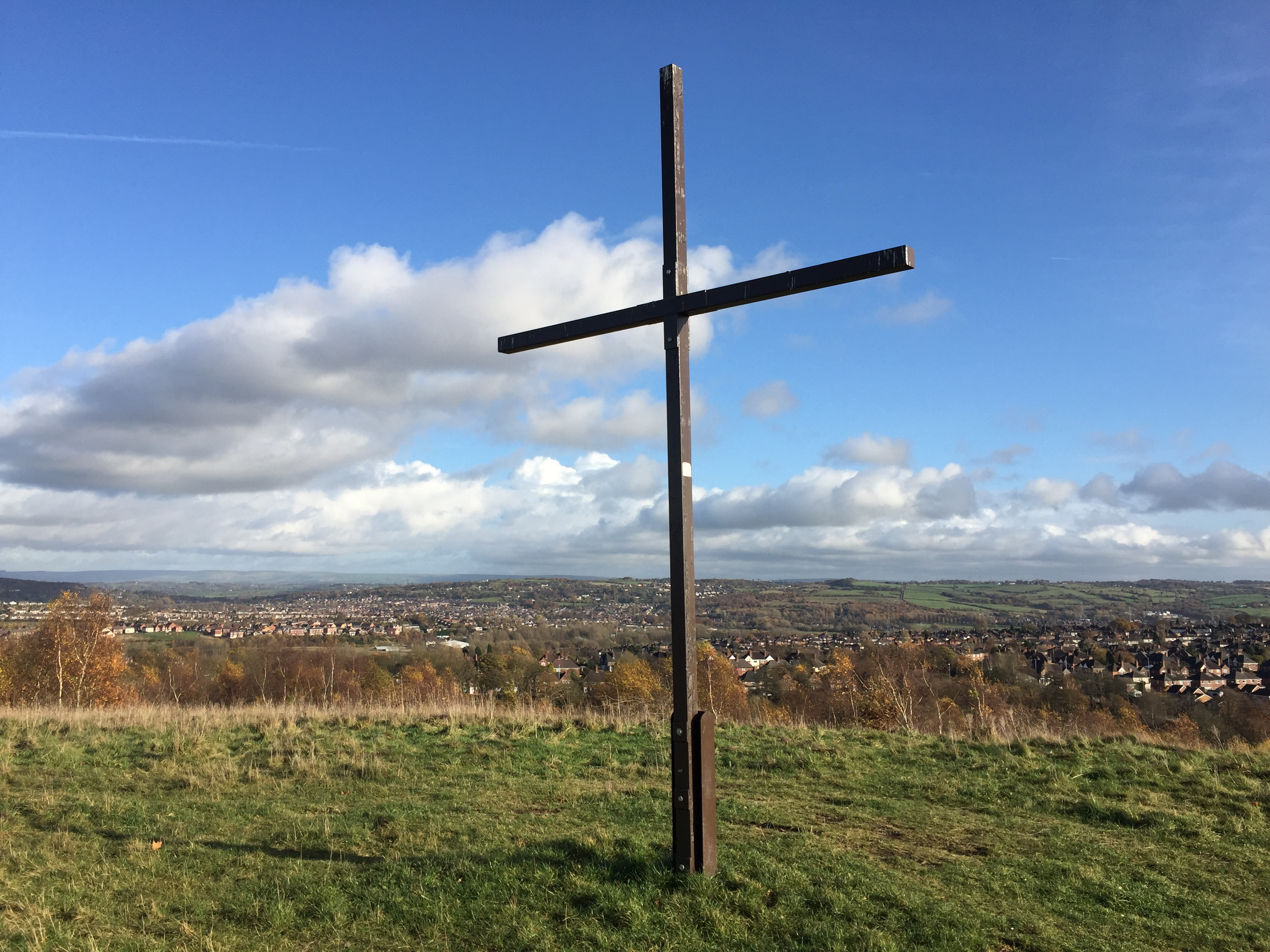
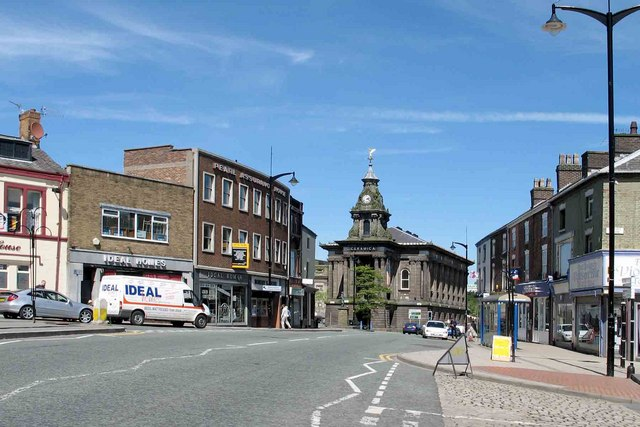
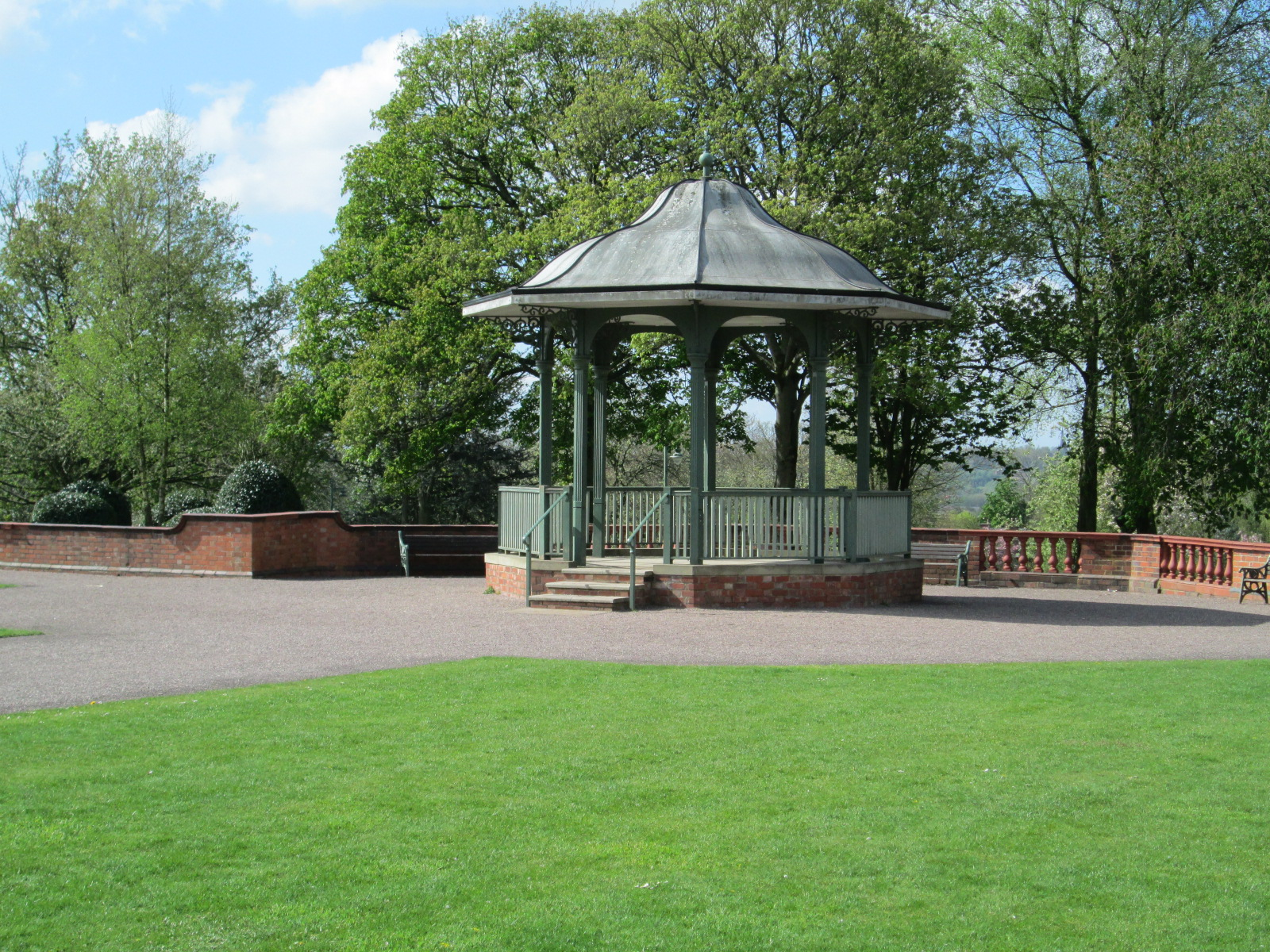
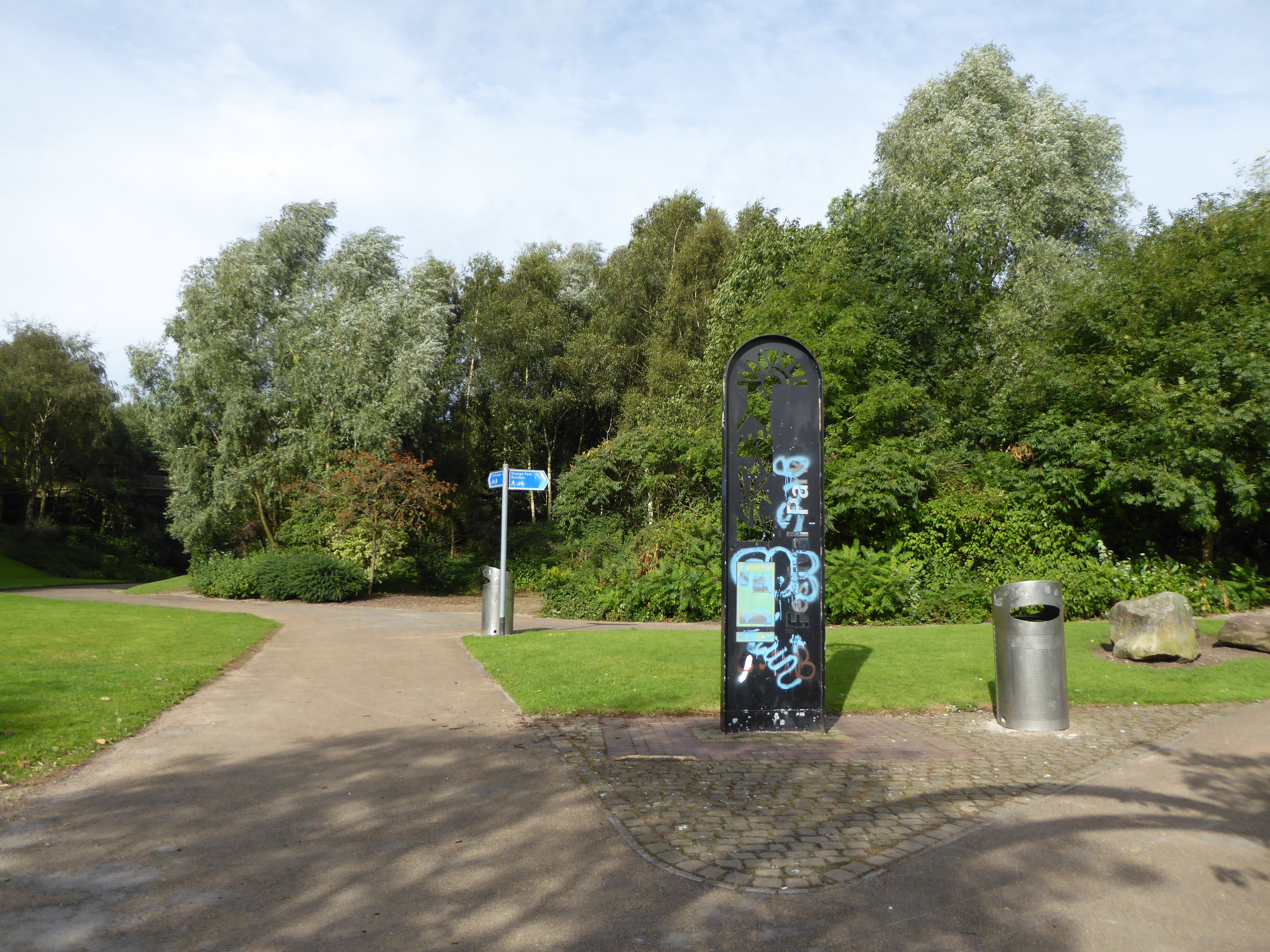
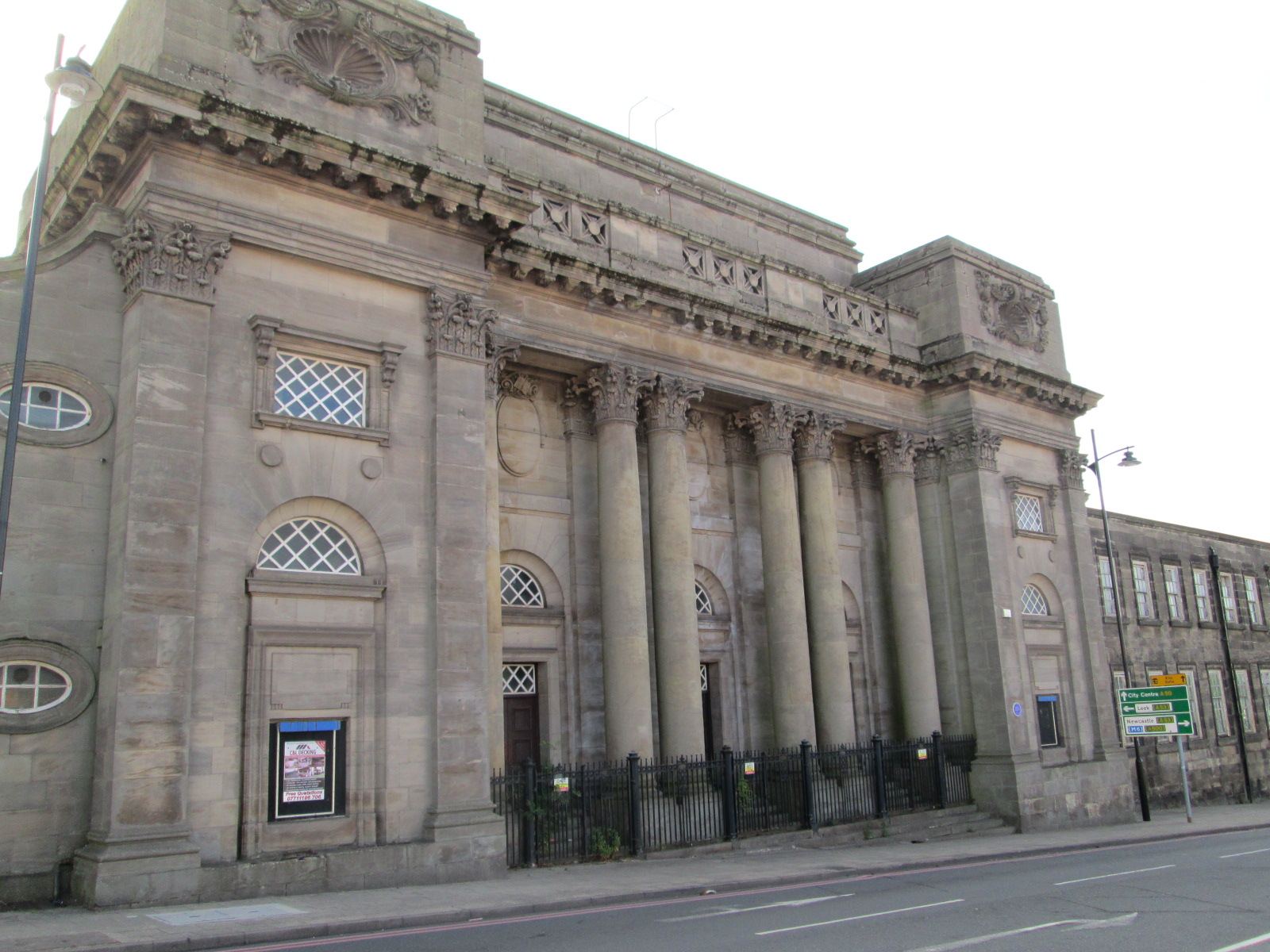
- Top: Burslem St John's Church; Upper: The George Hotel and the Cross at Sneyd Hill Park; Lower: Town Centre with the Old Town Hall and Burslem Park Bandstand; Bottom: Festival Park and Queens Theatre

- Location within Staffordshire
- Population: 6,940 (2021 Census)
- Demonym: Boslomite
- OS grid reference: SJ875495
- Unitary authority: Stoke-on-Trent
- Ceremonial county: Staffordshire
- Region: West Midlands
- Country: England
- Sovereign state: United Kingdom
- Districts of the town: List: Cobridge (part); Longport; Middleport; Norton le Moors; Smallthorne
- Post town: STOKE-ON-TRENT
- Postcode district: ST6
- Dialling code: 01782
- Police: Staffordshire
- Fire: Staffordshire
- Ambulance: West Midlands
- UK Parliament: Stoke-on-Trent North

Burslem (/ˈbɜːrzləm/ BURZ-ləm) is one of the six towns that along with Hanley, Tunstall, Fenton, Longton and Stoke-upon-Trent form part of the city of Stoke-on-Trent in Staffordshire, England. It is often referred to as the "mother town" of Stoke-on-Trent. The population of the town was included under the Burslem Central ward and had a population of 6,490 in the 2021 Census.

== Topography ==
Burslem is on the eastern ridge of the Fowlea Valley, the Fowlea being one of the main early tributaries of the River Trent. Burslem includes Middleport, Dalehall, Longport, Westport, Trubshaw Cross and Brownhills. The Trent & Mersey Canal cuts through, to the west and south of the town centre. A little further west, the West Coast Main Line railway and the A500 road run in parallel, forming a distinct boundary between Burslem and the abutting town of Newcastle-under-Lyme. To the south is Grange Park and Festival Park, reclaimed by the Stoke-on-Trent Garden Festival.

== History ==
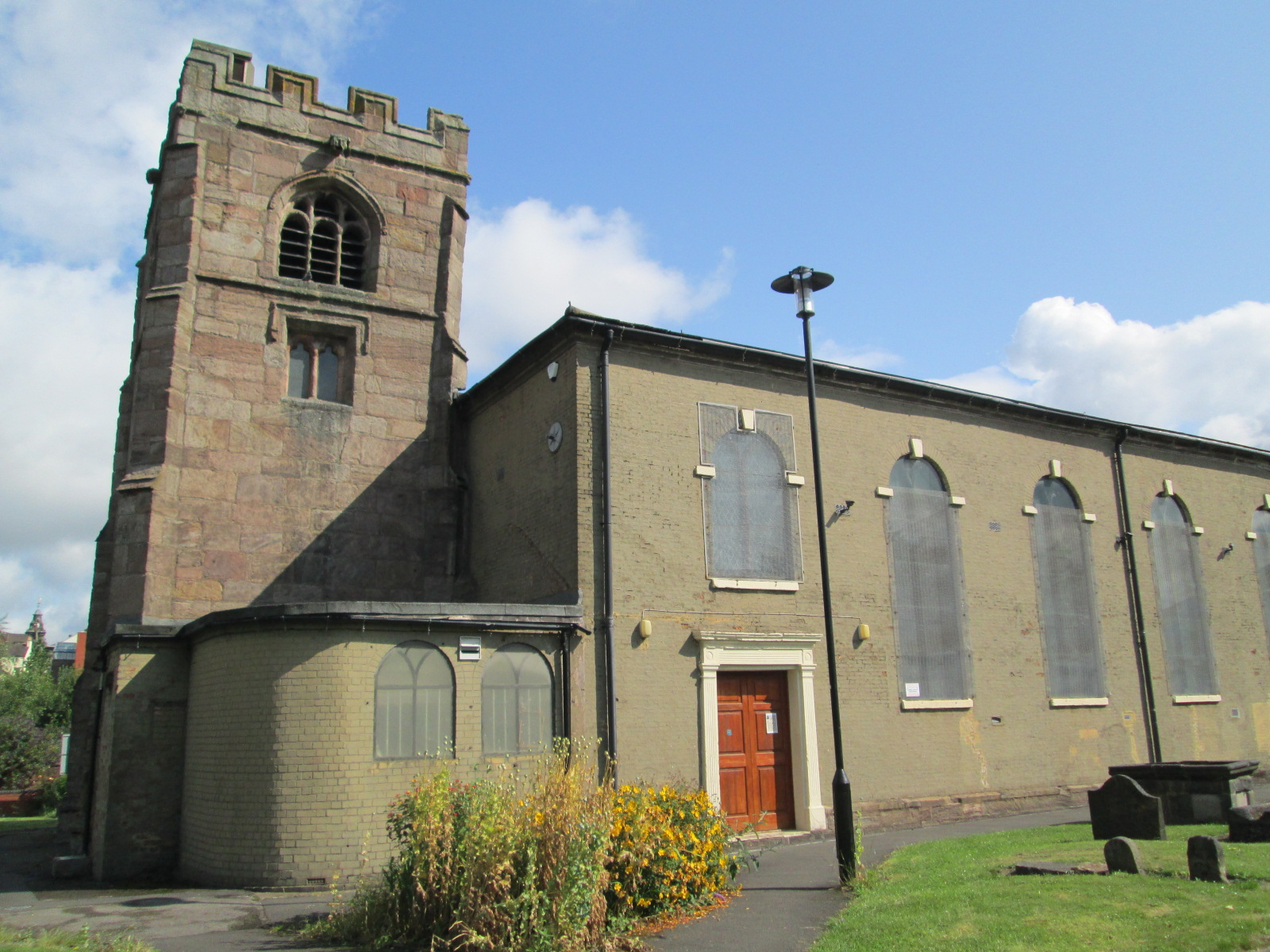
Church of St John the Baptist, Burslem

The Domesday Book shows Burslem (listed as Bacardeslim) as a small farming hamlet, strategically sited above a ford at Longport, part of the major pack horse track out of the Peak District and Staffordshire Moorlands to the Liverpool/London road. The name refers to the Old English personal name Burgweard and the former Forest of Lyme (reflected in the nearby town of Newcastle-under-Lyme). As far back as the late 12th century, a thriving pottery industry existed, based on the fine and abundant local clays. After the Black Death, Burslem appears in the records as a medieval town; St John the Baptist's Church on Cross Hill, with a stone tower dating from 1536, was extended in the 18th century, and is in use. Until the mid-1760s Burslem was relatively cut off from the rest of England: it had no navigable river nearby, and there were no good and reliable roads.

By 1777 the Trent and Mersey Canal was nearing completion, and the roads had markedly improved. The town boomed on the back of fine pottery production and canals, and became known as The Mother Town of the six towns that make up the city. Hill Top Methodist Church and Sunday School opened on Westport Road in 1836. The railway station opened in 1848. The Burslem School of Art was founded in 1853. A new town hall was built in the market place in 1854, designed by G. T. Robinson of Leamington in elaborate baroque style. In 1906, the Woodall Memorial Congregational Church (named in memory of William Woodall, a local MP who successively represented Stoke-upon-Trent and Hanley) was opened on Moorland Road; it later became Burslem United Reformed Church.

In 1910, the town was federated into the county borough of Stoke-on-Trent, and the borough was granted city status in 1925. The new town hall was built in 1911 on Wedgwood Place, in neo-classical style, designed by Russell and Cooper.

On 1 April 1922 the parish was abolished and merged with Stoke-on-Trent. At the 1921 census, the last before the abolition of the parish, Burslem had a population of 42,442.

Many of the novels of Arnold Bennett evoke Victorian Burslem, with its many potteries, mines, and working canal barges. The Burslem of the 1930s to the 1980s is evoked by the paintings and plays of Arthur Berry.

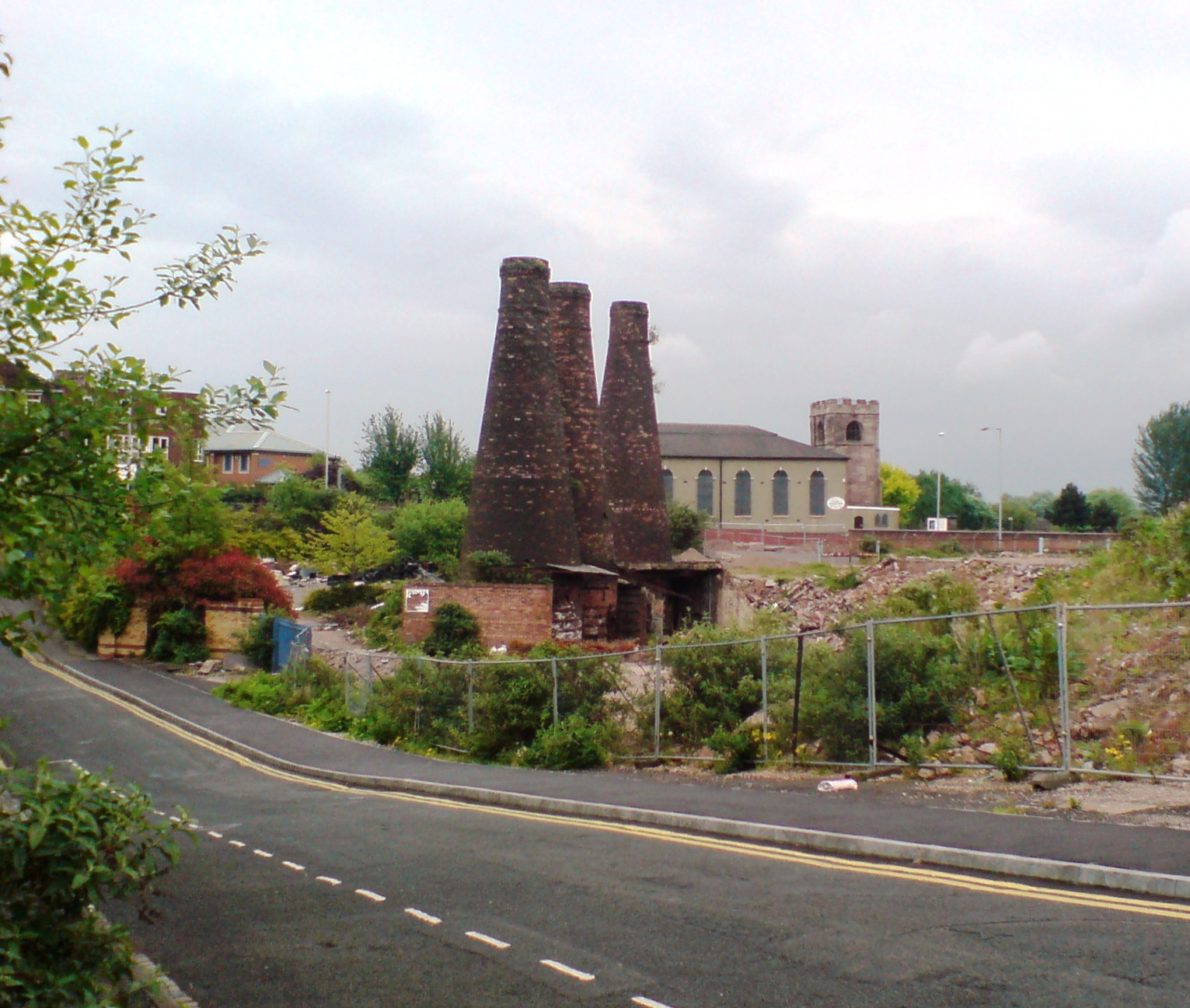
Disused bottle ovens of Acme Marls on Bourne's Bank, Burslem with St John's Church, Woodbank Street, in the background.(Photographed May 2008)

=== Trade journals ===
"Burslem, an ancient town, with a market held for a long period by custom, and subsequently sanctioned by an act of parliament, is about three miles from Newcastle and two from Hanley, entitled to the precedence of other towns in this district, as claiming to be the mother, as it is the metropolis, of the Staffordshire Potteries."

— 1828 journal

"In the Doomsday Survey – for even in that early date Burslem was a place of some importance – the town appears, as "Burwardeslyn;" and frequent mention is made of it in ancient documents during the Middle Ages."

— 1893 journal

== Population and housing ==
At the 2011 census the ethnic demographics of the Burslem Central ward were:

White British and White Other	83.5%
Asian / Asian British	9.0%
Mixed / multiple ethnic groups	2.7%
Black / African / Caribbean / Black British	2.3%
Other ethnic group	1.0%

At the 2011 census the ethnic demographics of the Burslem Park ward were:

White British and White Other	90.3%
Asian / Asian British	5.50%
Mixed / multiple ethnic groups	1.92%
Black / African / Caribbean / Black British	1.38%
Other ethnic group	0.8%

== Economy ==
Industrial scale pottery production has drastically declined since the 1970s; but specialist makers (Steelite) and smaller producers of high-value ceramics (Burleigh, Wade, Moorcroft) are thriving. Burslem is emerging as a centre for small, freelance creative businesses working in sectors such as fine art, animation and crafts as well as pottery.

The number of shops in the town centre have markedly declined, hit by the impact of nearby out-of-town retail parks that offer free parking. However, the evening economy is still active with a wide range of bars and restaurants mainly serving English and Indian food.

The Market Hall, a Grade II listed building dating from 1879, lying between the market place and Queen Street, was in use until 2003, closing after its condition was judged unsafe.

At Spring 2002 unemployment was 4.1% or 1,526 people in the Stoke-on-Trent North constituency; almost the same rate as the West Midlands as a whole. In Burslem at 2001 unemployment was 3.2% and declining.

In 2005, the building of business park units in the town. Further business parks are planned for 2006/7 just to the north in Chatterley Valley, and the south in Etruria Valley.

In 2019 it was reported that the town's last bank had closed, leaving the town without any free to use cash machines, making it the first large town in the UK without one.

=== Media ===
Local television services is provided by BBC Midlands Today and ITV News Central.

Local radio stations are BBC Radio Stoke, Hits Radio Staffordshire & Cheshire, Greatest Hits Radio Staffordshire & Cheshire, 6 Towns Radio and HitMix Radio, a community based radio station.

In 2007 a social enterprise newspaper, Local Edition, become one of the first newspapers to cover the area regularly. The newspaper covered Burslem, as well as surrounding areas including Tunstall, Middleport and Cobridge, giving a voice to the people in the community. The newspaper ceased publication in 2008 and its archive is online.

=== Leopard Inn ===
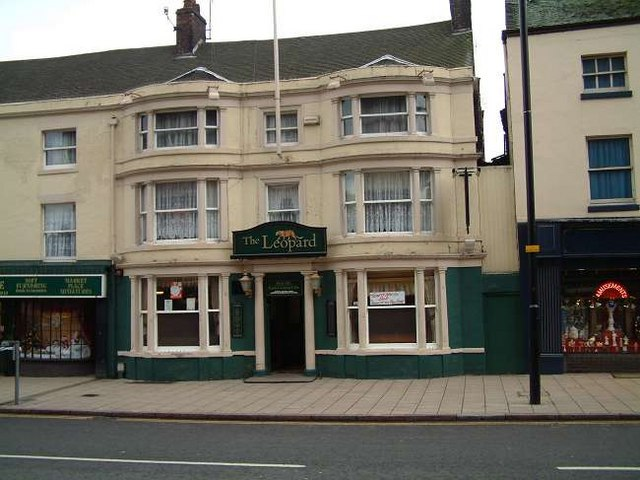
The Leopard in 2001

The Leopard public house, also known as the Leopard Inn, dates to the late 18th century. The building was refronted about 1830 and expanded in the 1870s with the addition of more than 50 bedrooms in the rear. In 1765 it was the location of the first meeting between Josiah Wedgwood, Thomas Bentley, Erasmus Darwin and James Brindley to discuss the building of what became the Trent and Mersey Canal; as The Tiger, it appears in several of Arnold Bennett's "Five Towns" novels. It was a coaching inn and after the rear extension, a major commercial hotel, but reduced demand for rooms led to the extension being closed off in 1956. The rediscovery of this section of the building in 2007 led to tales of hauntings and ghost tours.

Bass Breweries bought The Leopard in 1965 and renovated the restaurant, which they named the Arnold Bennett Suite. The building was Grade II listed on 18 April 1972. In the 21st century it became a live music venue and was extensively renovated, but it did not reopen after the COVID lockdown. In January 2021 it was sold to a development company who proposed redeveloping the rear into luxury apartments while retaining the pub; in February 2021 Stoke-on-Trent City Council declared it an Asset of Community Value. The following January, an illegal cannabis grow was discovered inside the vacant building, and it was then badly damaged in a suspected arson fire. The city council announced the formation of a Heritage Congress to protect historic properties in Stoke-on-Trent. In June 2024, the owners submitted a proposal to convert the building to a shop and 17 one-bedroom assisted living flats. It was reported in March 2025 that this proposal had been withdrawn, and an amended application would be submitted in the summer. Re-Form Heritage, the owner of Middleport Pottery, was reported in April 2025 to be carrying out a viability study into restoring the building and exploring options for its future use. The study is funded by Historic England and the Architectural Heritage Fund, and would be completed in the summer of 2025.

== Tourism ==
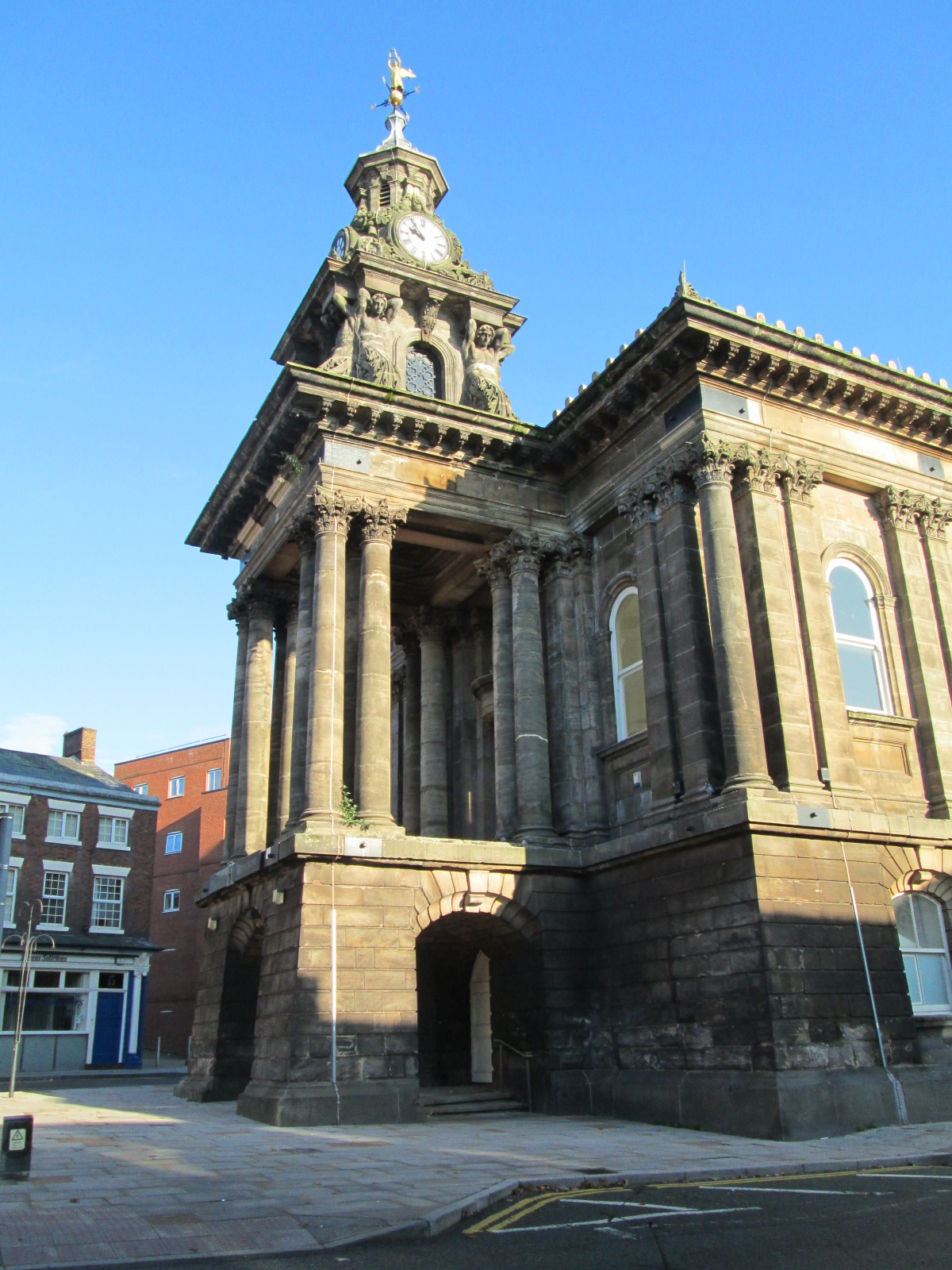
The Old Town Hall, Burslem, built in 1854. Architect: G. T. Robinson.

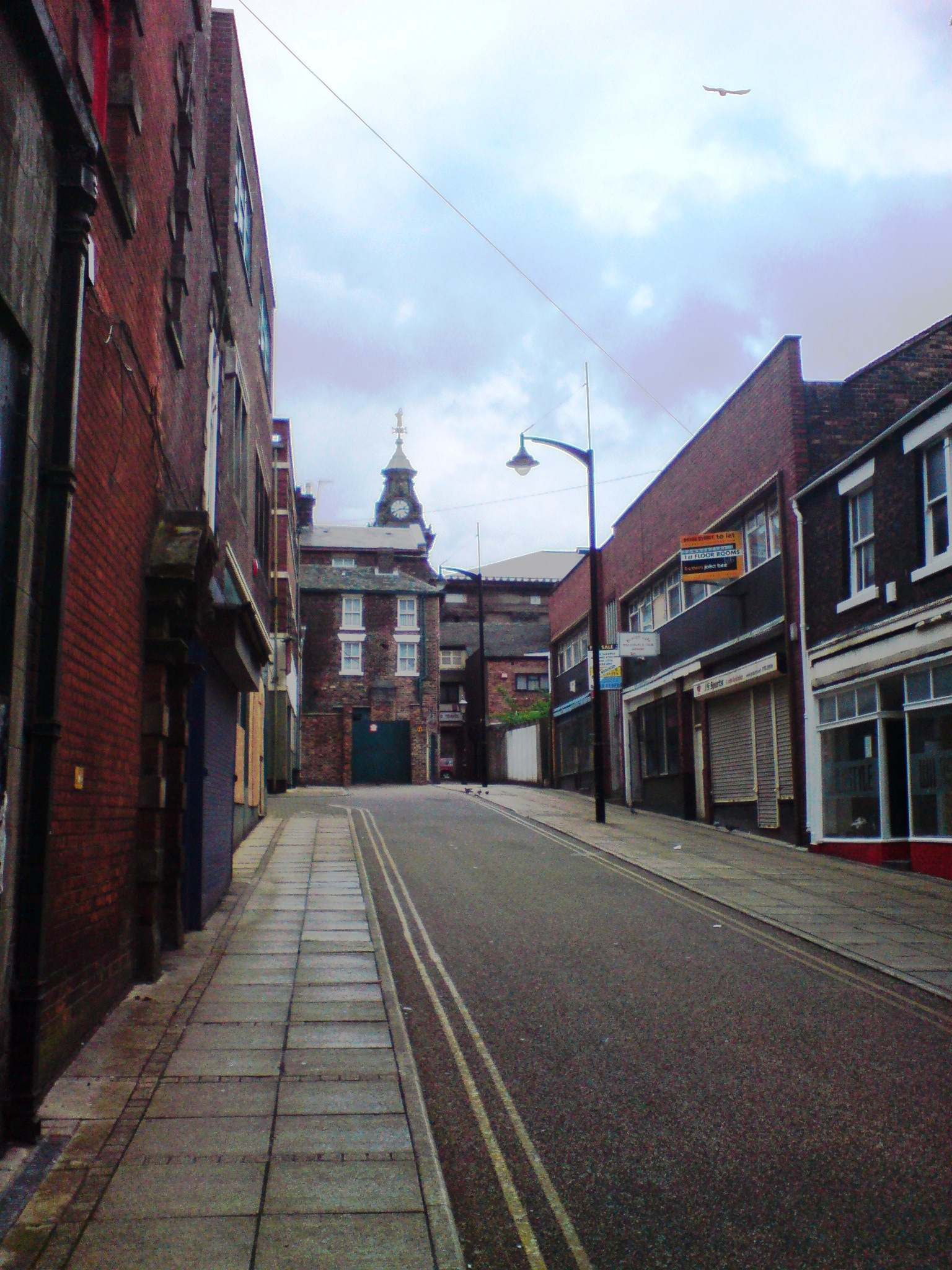
Clayhanger Street, Burslem, by the side of the Wedgwood Institute showing the clock tower of Burslem Town Hall in the background, May 2008

Around 5 million tourists visit Stoke-on-Trent each year, supporting around 4,400 direct jobs. Stoke shows its popularity through the number of repeat visits; around 80 per cent of visitors have previously been here. Burslem has a variety of strong tourist attractions; Burleigh, Moorcroft, Festival Park, its many pubs, and the Trent & Mersey Canal. The Old Town Hall is one of the largest buildings in Burslem.

It also has the legacy of novelist Arnold Bennett, who refers to the town and many of its streets with thinly disguised names: e.g. Burslem/"Bursley", Swan (Square and Pub)/"Duck". It is the setting for one of his most famous works, the Clayhanger trilogy. Burslem's centre benefits from having an almost-intact medieval street-plan and countless fine old buildings, and a townscape which almost-totally escaped re-development during the 1960s and 1970s.

After being under-used for years, the Burslem School of Art has been refurbished at a cost of £2.1 million and offers several large free art galleries. The free Public Library is currently based in the School of Art, after the Venetian Gothic Wedgwood Institute closed for safety reasons early in 2009. Ceramica was a new award-winning ceramics family attraction, based in the imposing old Town Hall and funded by Millennium Lottery money but due to the loss of council funding has been closed. The Queen's Theatre has regular concerts and an annual pantomime.

There is a traditional Friday street market, and street carnivals in May and December.

== Sports ==
The major football club Port Vale is based in Burslem at Vale Park. The team currently plays in the EFL League One, England's third division.

Near to the town is Burslem Golf Club, a 9-hole course which once had singer Robbie Williams as a Junior Captain. It was opened on 28 September 1907 by vaudeville entertainer and golfer Sir Harry Lauder. On 29 September 2007 his great-nephew Gregory Lauder-Frost as guest-of-honour rededicated it for another century in a formal ceremony.

Professional darts player Phil Taylor is from Burslem.

== Education ==
Burslem is the site of one of the two campuses of Stoke-on-Trent College; the college states that it is the largest Further Education college in Stoke and North Staffordshire. The campus specialises in media-production and drama. Stoke Studio College, a studio school for 13- to 19-year-olds opened at the college campus in September 2013.

Within a six-mile radius from Burslem there are three universities; Staffordshire at Shelton, Keele University, and Manchester Metropolitan's large Art & Design campus at Alsager.

== The environment ==
The town is elevated and is not prone to flooding.

=== Parks ===
==== Burslem Park ====
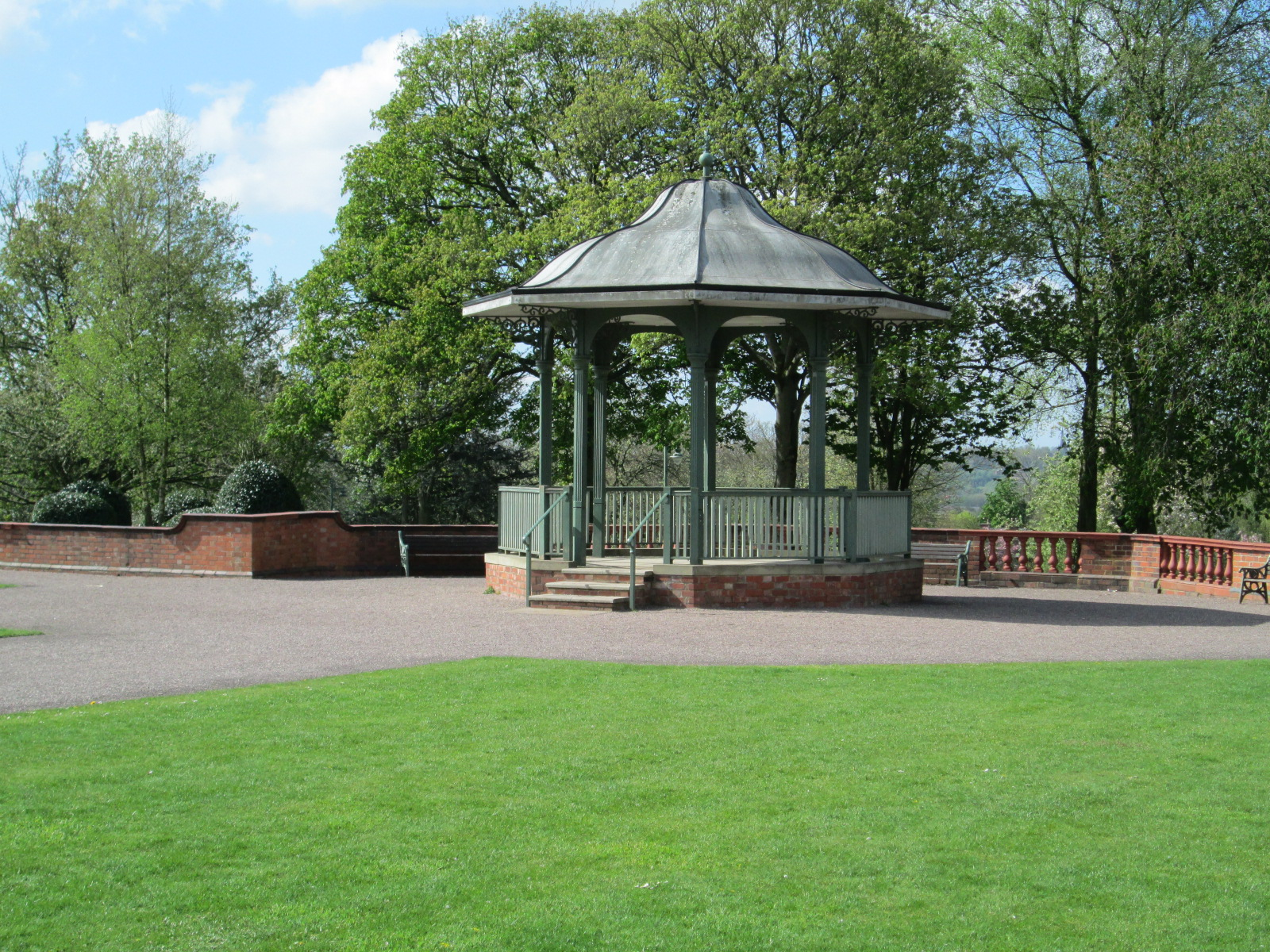
Bandstand in Burslem Park

The town's municipal park, designed by the landscape architect Thomas Hayton Mawson, was opened in 1894. It is protected by a Grade II* designation on the Register of Parks and Gardens. It was laid out on derelict land next to the Potteries Loop Line. Mawson also used reclaimed land as the site of Hanley Park, which he designed around the same time. Both parks include water features.

==== Other parks ====
There are also later examples of reclaimed green space near Burslem, such as the Westport Lake, a 1970s project, and the legacy of the 1986 National Garden Festival, which imaginatively reclaimed part of the site of the Shelton Bar steelworks.

The Peak District National Park begins just ten miles north-east of Burslem.

=== Burslem cemetery ===
The cemetery, to the east of Sneyd Hill Park, was laid out in 1879 as a combined burial ground and recreational park. It covers 11.4 acres, and comprised walks, rides, lodges and a chapel, situated at the centre. The chapel was demolished by the council in 2008 on the basis of lack of use and the costs of maintenance and repair. The ashes of the novelist Arnold Bennett were interred in his family tomb in the cemetery, following his death in 1931. The cemetery contains the Commonwealth war graves of 130 service personnel of both World Wars.

== Transport ==
The nearby A500 gives access to the M6 motorway. Longport railway station offers direct connections south into Stoke, east to Derby and Nottingham, and north to Crewe and Manchester. The town is straddled by two major off-road cycle paths, part of the National Cycle Network.

The Trent and Mersey canal is said to see over 10,000 narrowboats a year using it. The former Burslem Canal was constructed in 1805 and remained open until 1961 when it was breached. The Burslem Canal was a branch of the Trent and Mersey Canal running from the junction near to Newport Lane (opposite the old steel works) through to the Furlong Lane area of Middleport.

The nearest international airports are Manchester and Birmingham; each is about 60 minutes away by train.

Burslem railway station which was opened by the North Staffordshire Railway opened on 1 November 1873 on the Potteries Loop Line. It closed in the 1960s and the site and trackbed are now a greenway.

== Notable people ==
Burslem's most famous sons include the potter Josiah Wedgwood, the watercolour painter James Holland (1800–1870), Ian "Lemmy" Kilmister (1945-2015), the founder, bassist and lead singer of Motörhead who would later be honored with a statue, and Robbie Williams, who was a major shareholder in Port Vale and whose family are still resident in the area. Darts legend and 16-time world champion Phil Taylor was born, raised and also worked in the town.

In the 17th century, Molly Leigh was resident of the town, she was accused of being a witch before her death in 1748. Painter James Astbury Hammersley also came from Burslem.

William Frederick Horry owned the George Hotel in the 1860s before murdering his wife Jane at his father's house in Boston, Lincolnshire. Despite pleas for clemency he was hanged at Lincoln Castle on 1 April 1872 and his body interred with other executed felons in the interior of the Castle's Lucy Tower, where it can still be seen.

William Clowes, one of the founders of Primitive Methodism, was born in Burslem as was John Bennett the potter. Sarah Benett (1850–1924), the Suffragette, member of the WSPU and social reformer lived in Burslem from 1894.

William Boulton's Providence Works and Foundry was based in Burslem, which designed and made the machinery that revolutionised the pottery industry in the second half of the 19th century.

== In popular culture ==
George Formby's first sound film, Boots! Boots!, got its world premiere in Burslem in 1934.

The 1952 film adaptation of Arnold Bennett's The Card was partly filmed on location in the town. Bennett's classic 1908 novel, The Old Wives’ Tale, was set in a fictionalized version of Burslem, there referred to as Bursley.

Robbie Williams included the song "Burslem Normals"' on his album Rudebox, released in 2006. A short film, Goodbye to the Normals was also made.

A song "Waterloo Road" performed by Jason Crest was written (by Mike Deighan and Mike Wilsh) about the Waterloo Road in Burslem. The song became very popular and even reached no. 1 in France when the French singer Joe Dassin covered it under the title "Les Champs Élysées".

The guitarist Slash, lead guitarist of Guns N' Roses, was also an inhabitant of Stoke-on-Trent in his early years.

== Gallery ==
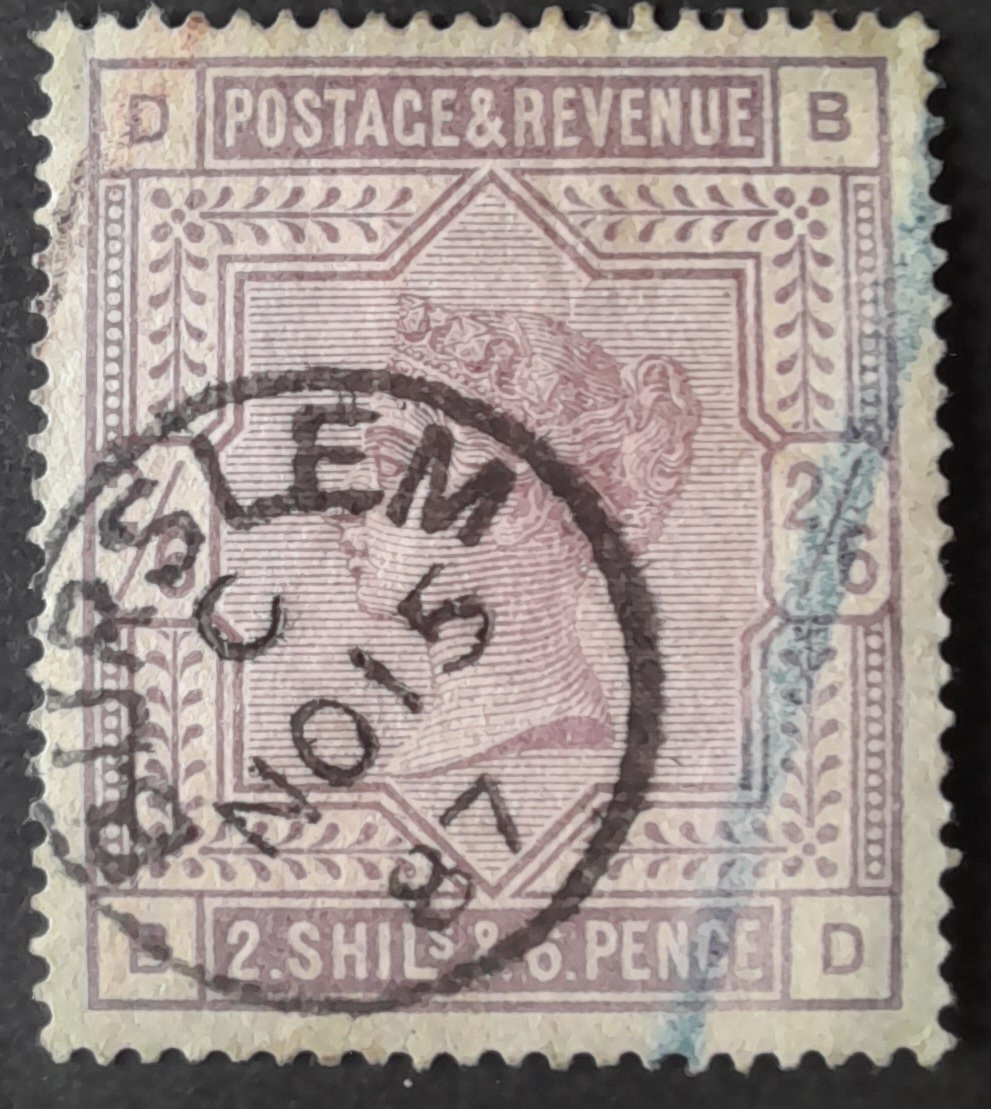
1887 Burslem postmark on Queen Victoria lilac 2 shillings six pence stamp with blue crayon mark.

== See also ==
- 1842 Pottery riots
- Burslem (UK Parliament constituency), abolished Parliamentary constituency
- The Duke William, a Grade-II listed public house in Burslem
- Smallthorne, nearby area
