= Ceramica =

Museum in Burslem, Staffordshire, England, UK

Coordinates: 53°02′44″N 2°11′53″W

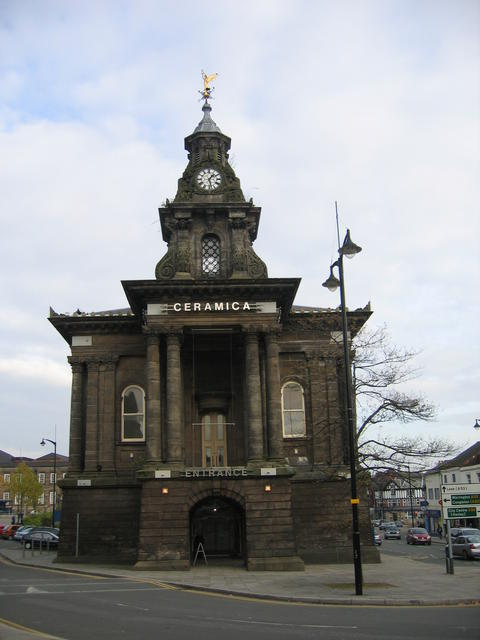
The old town hall, Burslem (2006)

Ceramica was a museum in Burslem, Stoke-on-Trent, which explored the history of the area's pottery industry. It was located in the former Burslem Town Hall.

Exhibits included displays about ceramics manufacturers Wade Ceramics, Royal Doulton, Sadlers, Dudson, Steelite, Royal Stafford, Moorland, Burleigh Pottery, Moorcroft and Cobridge Stoneware. There were interactive displays and video presentations for children on ceramic history and local history.

The museum was set up using National Lottery money from the Millennium Commission and managed by a Trust. In March 2011 the museum closed as a result of a significant drop off in paying visitors following the closure of adjacent pottery manufacturers. The Trust was wound up and the buildings returned to the City Council. The main building, the former Town Hall, is now home to Haywood Academy sixth form college whilst the modern extension was demolished as uneconomic to repair.
