= St Luke's Church, Blakenhall =

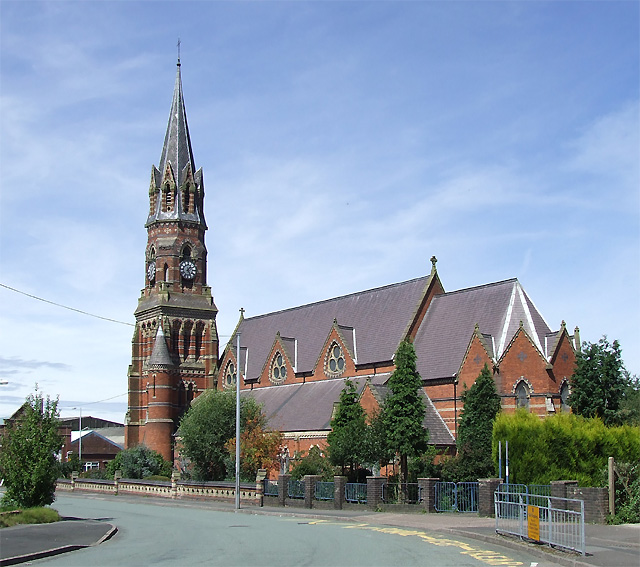
- St Luke's Church, Blakenhall
- St Luke's Church, Blakenhall
- 52°34′20.21″N 2°7′47.28″W
- OS grid reference: SO 91321 97172
- Location: Blakenhall
- Country: England
- Denomination: None
- Previous denomination: Church of England
- Churchmanship: Conservative Evangelical

History
- Status: Deconsecrated
- Dedication: St Luke
- Consecrated: 18 July 1861

Architecture
- Functional status: Parish church
- Heritage designation: Grade II* listed
- Architect: George Thomas Robinson
- Groundbreaking: 1860
- Completed: 1861
- Closed: 2017

Administration
- Diocese: Diocese of Lichfield
- Archdeaconry: Archdeaconry of Walsall
- Deanery: Wolverhampton
- Parish: Wolverhampton St Luke

Clergy
- Bishop: The Rt Revd Rob Munro (AEO)
- Vicar: The Revd Richard Espin-Bradley

St Luke's Church, Blakenhall is a Grade II* listed former parish church in the Church of England in Blakenhall, Wolverhampton.

== History ==
The foundation stone was laid on 26 June 1860 by Revd. W. Dalton, vicar of St Philip's Church, Penn. It was designed by the architect G. T. Robinson of Leamington Spa, and was consecrated by the Bishop of Lichfield on 18 July 1861. A set of eight bells were installed in 1897 by James Barwell of Birmingham, and are the last complete ring of bells to be cast by that founder.

Pevsner describes the church as furiously unruly.

=== Present use ===
In 2014 it was announced that parts of the tower and spire were unsafe and the roof and floor had dry rot. The Diocese of Lichfield was seeking formal closure of the church as the congregation was unable to raise funding to match that offered by English Heritage to repair the church. In 2016 a petition to save the building from demolition gained over 1,500 signatures. The church closed in 2017, and while several groups were interested in purchasing it, including a Sikh congregation, the building is now used as an antiques shop. The former congregation now meets in St. Luke's School a short distance away.

Also within the parish is a tin tabernacle on Pond Lane, used as a Mission hall.
