= The Duke William, Stoke-on-Trent =

Public house in Burslem, England

The Duke William
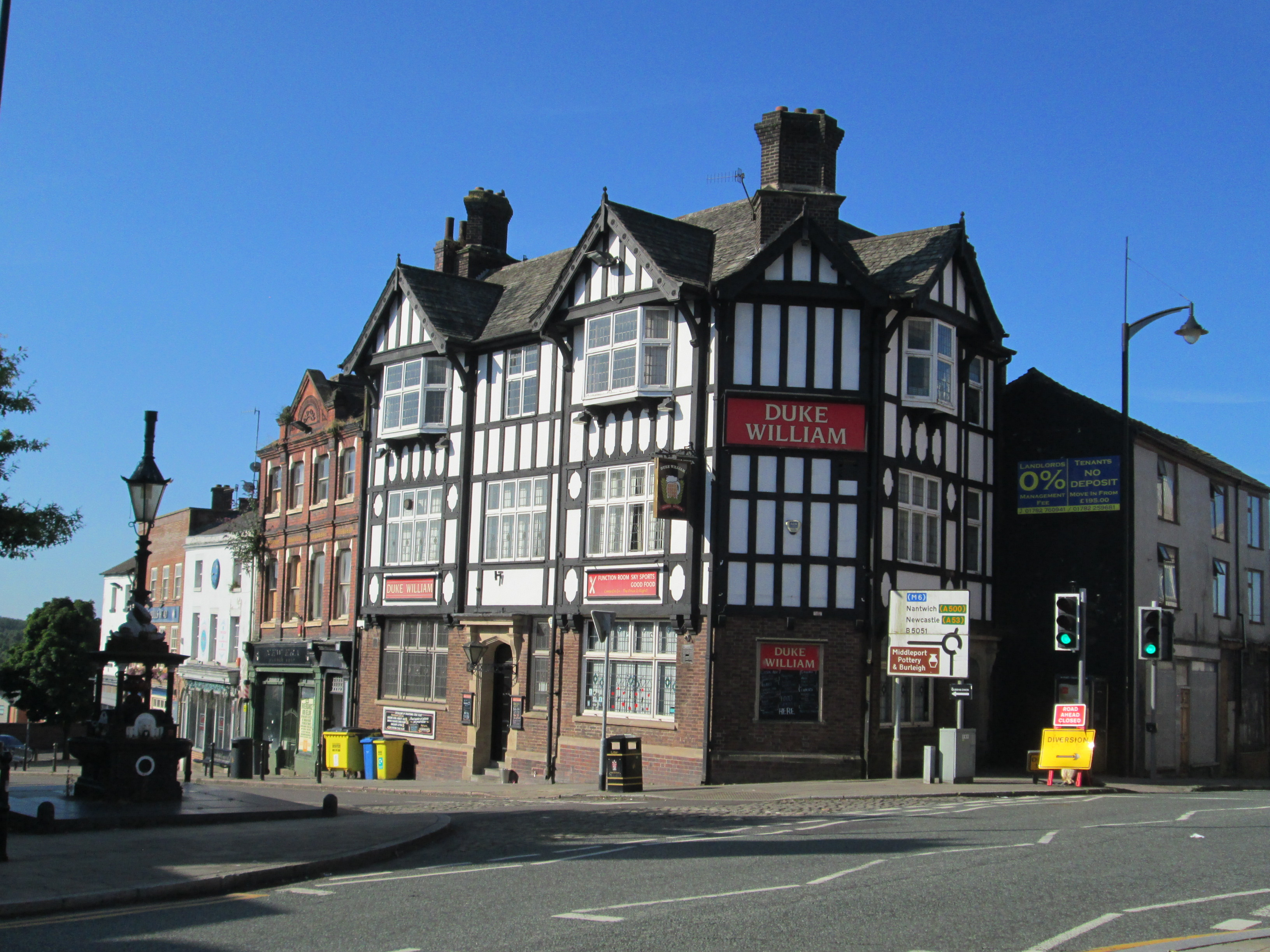
- Interactive map of the The Duke William area

General information
- Status: Grade II listed
- Location: Burslem, 2 St John's Square; Burslem ST6 3AJ, Staffordshire, Stoke-on-Trent, United Kingdom
- Coordinates: 53°2′41.208″N 2°11′57.916″W grid reference SJ 86728 49741

The Duke William is a Grade II listed public house at 2 St John's Square, in Burslem, Stoke-on-Trent, Staffordshire, England. There has been a public house on this site since 1818 or earlier, and it was rebuilt in its present form in the 1920s.

== History and description ==
The earliest known mention of the pub is in a trade directory of 1818, when it was one of five pubs in St John's Square. It became a larger building in the mid 19th century, and it is thought the pub was acquired in 1864 by Bass, Ratcliff and Gretton.

It was rebuilt by Bass in 1929 in "Brewer's Tudor" style, taking in the adjacent property at nos. 6–8, and with the height increased from two to three storeys.

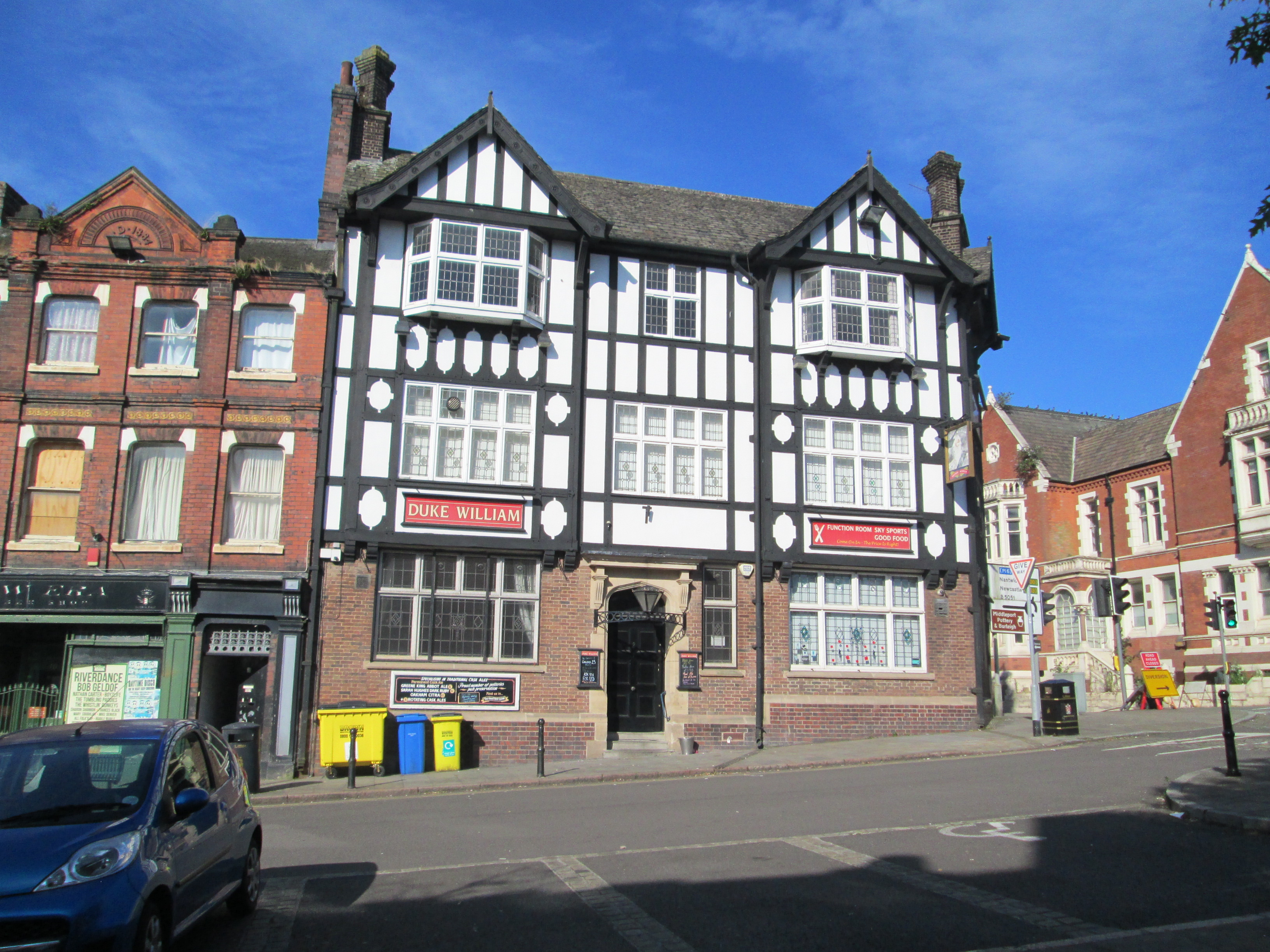
The frontage on St John's Square

The ground floor is built of brick, and the upper floors are half-timbered. The frontage on St Johns's Square has a doorway framed in stone, having an entablature on fluted brackets, and there are casement windows of three lights on each side. The floor above has casement windows on each of the three bays; the top floor has oriel windows on either side of a casement window. The gables above the oriel windows each have a bargeboard decorated with Tudor roses, and a finial.
