= Old Town Hall, Burslem =

Municipal building in Burslem, Staffordshire, England

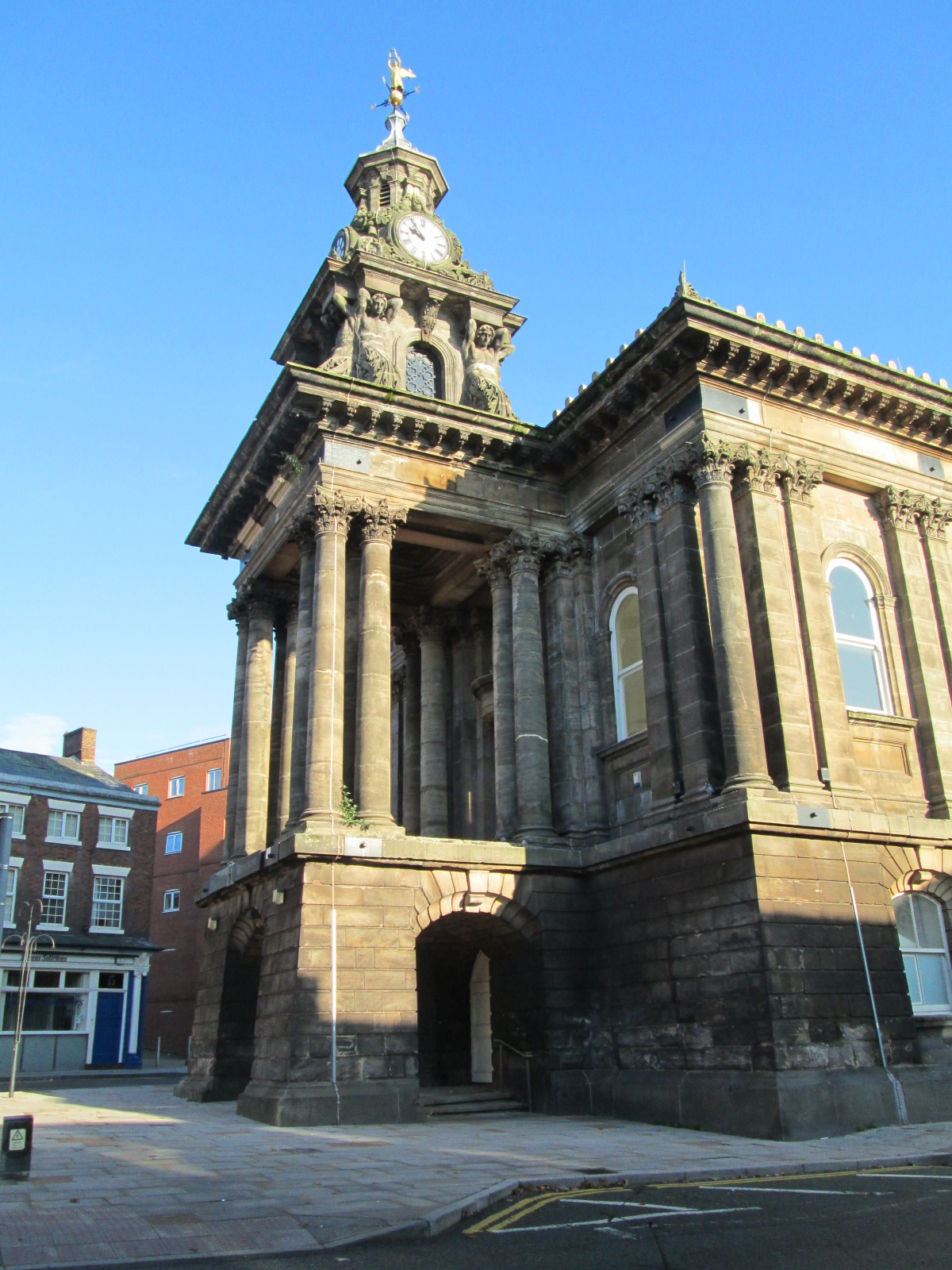
- The portico at the west end

- Shown in Staffordshire
- 53°02′44″N 2°11′53″W
- Location: Market Place, Burslem

History
- Built: 1857

Site notes
- Architect: G. T. Robinson
- Architectural style: Baroque style

Listed Building – Grade II*
- Designated: 2 October 1951
- Reference no.: 1195811

The Old Town Hall is a former town hall in Burslem, in Staffordshire, England. It is in the Market Place, in the centre of the town. It is a Grade II* listed building, listed on 2 October 1951.

== History ==
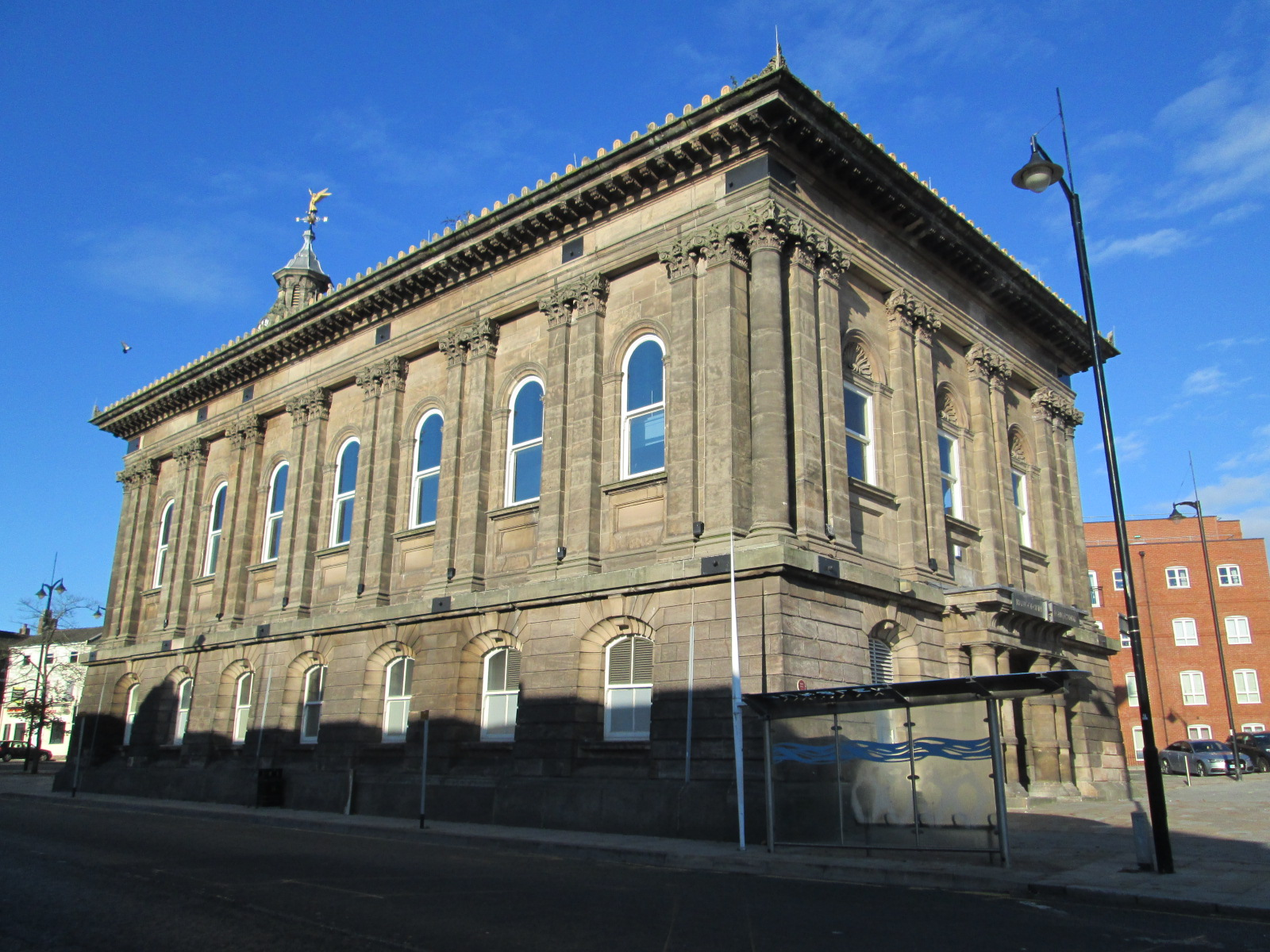
Viewed from the south-east

The first town hall in the town, erected in the centre of the Market Place in 1761, was a rectangular two-storey building with open arches on the ground floor, a meeting hall on the first floor and a clock tower with a cupola on top. It was demolished to make way for the second town hall which was built on the same site.

The second town hall, now referred to as the "Old Town Hall", which was designed by G. T. Robinson of Wolverhampton in the Baroque style, was built between 1854 and 1857. It was designed with paired Corinthian pilasters for the height of the upper storey, above which a cornice surmounted by acroteria was placed. At the west end a projecting portico with arched entrances, was erected above which Corinthian columns were placed; above these, caryatids supported an octagonal clock turret (containing an hour-striking clock by Smith of Derby) with a gilded angel finial. The town hall became the headquarters of the new borough of Burslem in 1878 but it ceased to be the local seat of government when the Federation of Stoke-on-Trent was formed in March 1910. (Note: A third building, originally commissioned as a town hall, was erected in Wedgwood Street and completed in 1911 but was immediately rendered obsolete in that role and was converted into a theatre.)

The old town hall was used as a public library for much of the 20th century. It was used for scenes in the film The Card starring Alec Guinness in 1952, and although there were proposals to demolish it in the 1960s, it survived and had become a recreation centre by the 1990s. The gilded angel was restored and re-gilded by Bailey International Steeplejacks in Macclesfield in December 2000.

From 2003 the building housed Ceramica, a visitor centre showing the artistic and industrial heritage of the Potteries. The project was funded by the Millennium Commission. Part of the budget had to be spent in dealing with dry rot found in the building. The exhibition attracted fewer visitors than anticipated, and after Stoke-on-Trent City Council withdrew funding for day-to-day running, it closed in March 2011.

The building remained empty until 2015, when the modern extension built as part of the Ceramica exhibition was demolished and the Old Town Hall was converted into a sixth form college of Haywood Academy, a project sponsored by Steelite International.
