= Haywood Academy =

Location
- High Lane; Stoke On Trent, Staffordshire, ST6 7AB; England
- Coordinates: 53.0552°N 2.1890°W

Information
- Type: Academy
- Motto: "Inspiring Creativity & Achievement"
- Department for Education URN: 138549 Tables
- Ofsted: Reports
- Principal: Adele Mills
- Gender: Mixed
- Age: 11 to 19
- Enrolment: 1160
- Houses: Rhodes, Baskeyfield, Mitchell
- Website: clt.haywood.coop

Haywood Academy is a secondary school with academy status for 11- to 19-year-olds located on High Lane in the Stoke On Trent town of Burslem, England. The Sixth Form is located in the Old Town Hall in Burslem, 1 mile from the main site. It was formerly known as Haywood Engineering College, and changed its name in July 2013 to reflect its Academy status. Haywood Academy is a member of the Schools Cooperative Society and is a cooperative school, governed by local people for the benefit of local young people. Its innovative sixth form provision has been highly regarded by the DFE as best practice.

== History ==
It was formerly known as Stanfield Technical High School, then as Haywood High School, followed by Haywood Engineering College and currently Haywood Academy.
