= Westport Lake, Stoke-on-Trent =

Lake in Stoke-on-Trent, UK

Westport Lake
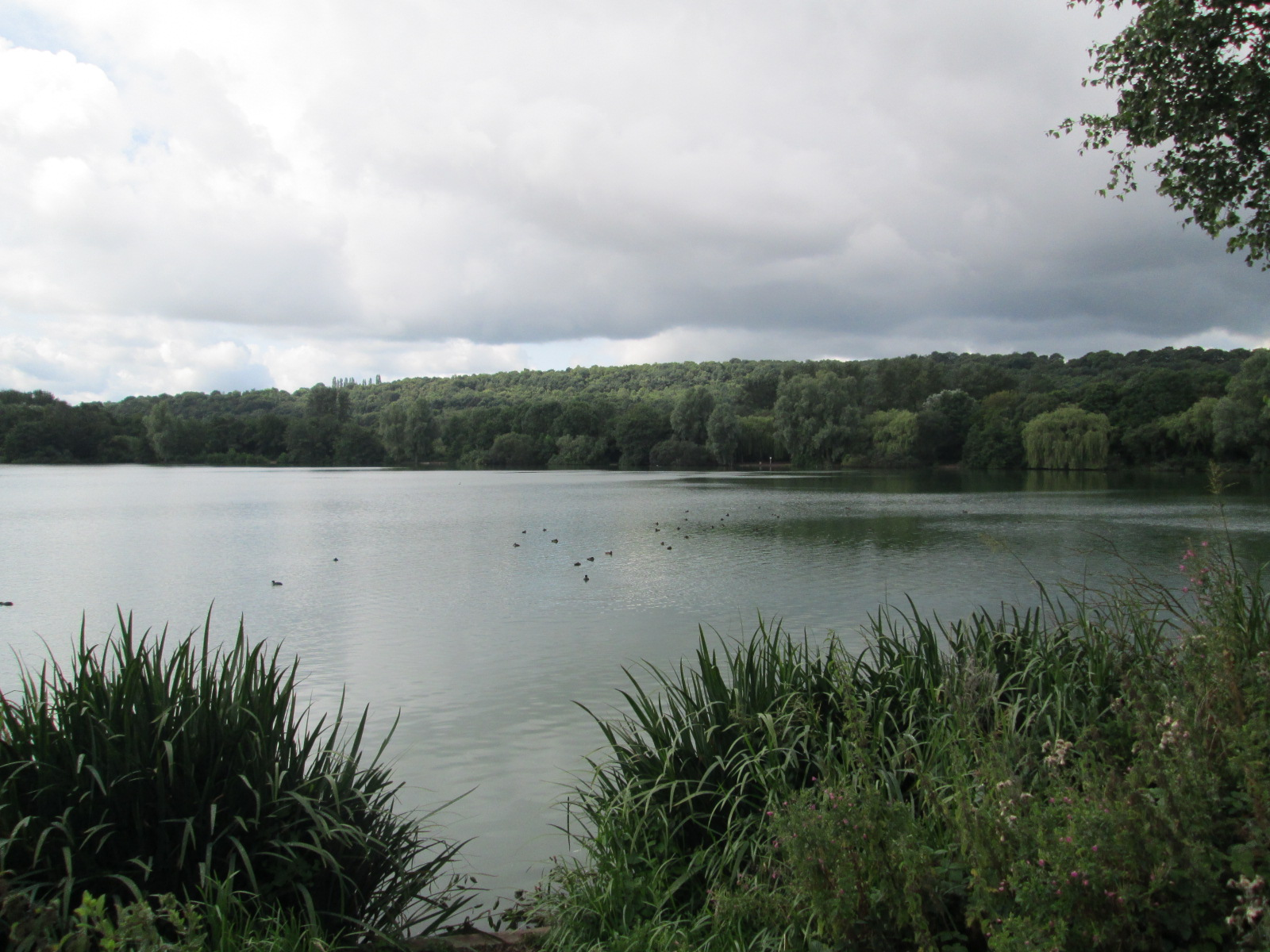
- Looking across the lake

- Location: Stoke-on-Trent, Staffordshire grid reference SJ 855 502
- Coordinates: 53°2′53″N 2°12′53″W
- Max. length: 0.38 kilometres (0.24 mi)
- Max. width: 0.32 kilometres (0.20 mi)
- Website: Westport Lake

Westport Lake is a lake and local nature reserve in Stoke-on-Trent, in Staffordshire, England, about 0.8 miles (1.3 km) south of Tunstall. It is alongside the Trent and Mersey Canal.

It is owned by the Canal and River Trust, and is operated by Stoke-on-Trent City Council.

The visitor centre at Westport Lake was operated by the Staffordshire Wildlife Trust until the end of September 2024.

The lake is the largest expanse of water in Stoke-on-Trent. There is a level footpath of about 1 mile (1.6 km) around the lake. There is waterfowl on the lake, and it is an overwintering site for many species.

== History ==
In the 1890s the lake was developed as a pleasure resort, but it later became a wasteland. It was an early landscape regeneration project of Stoke-on-Trent; it was opened in 1972 as a recreation and conservation area.
