= George Thomas Robinson =

English architect

George Thomas Robinson FSA (c.1827 - 6 May 1897) was an English architect who started in Wolverhampton, moved to Manchester, Leamington Spa and later to London.

== Life ==
He was a pupil of John R. Hamilton and James Medland. He started his own practice in 1848 and worked in partnership with Henry John Paull as the firm of Paull and Robinson. He was appointed architect of the Coventry Archidiaconal Church Extension Society.

He was also a journalist and art critic for the Manchester Guardian. He was in Metz during the siege of the city in the Franco-Prussian War in 1870, and attempted to send messages to his editor by attaching them to balloons.

He died on 6 May 1897 at his home, 20 Earls Terrace, Kensington.

== Works ==
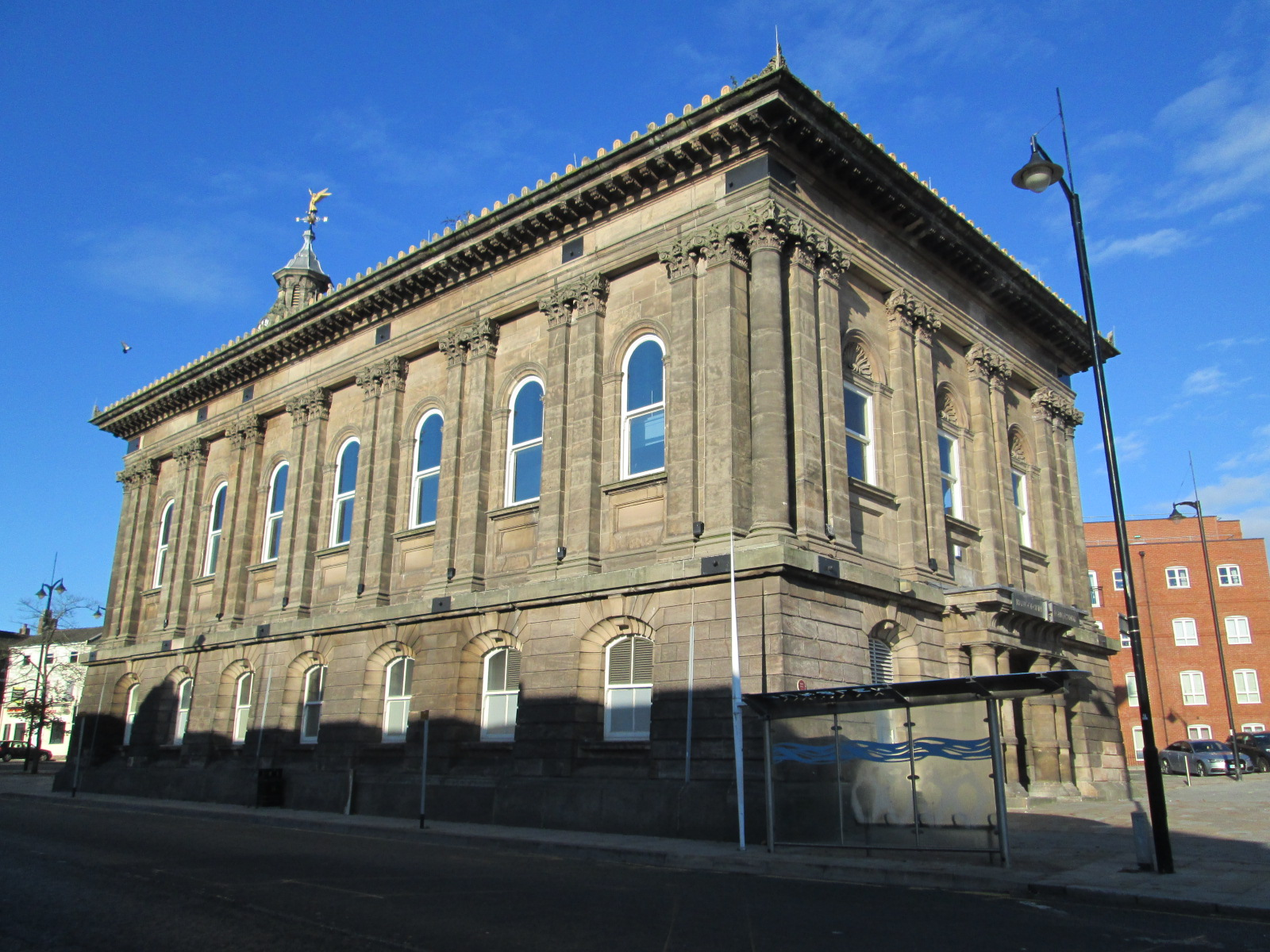
Old Town Hall, Burslem

- Wolverhampton Baths, Bath Street 1849 - 1850
- Christ Church, Gailey 1849 - 1851
- St James’ Church, Brownhills 1850 - 1851
- Wolverhampton Corn Exchange 1850 - 1853
- St John's Church, Bishopswood 1851
- Bolton Market Hall 1855
- Old Town Hall, Burslem, Stoke-on-Trent 1852 - 1857

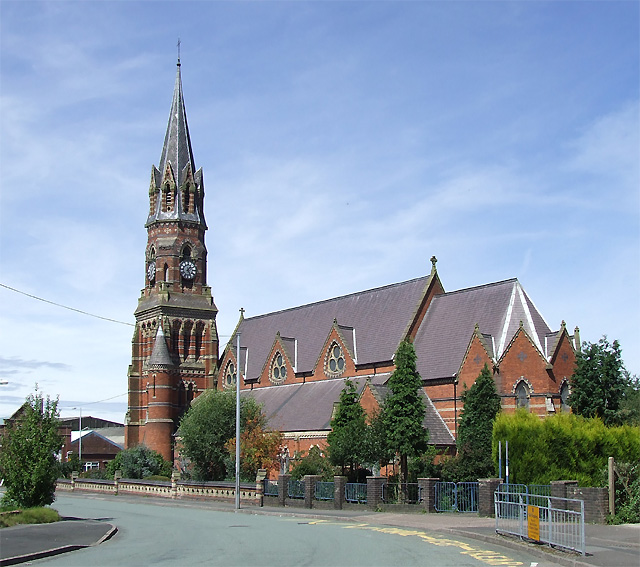
St Luke's Church, Blakenhall, Wolverhampton

- Monument to Cleophas Ratliff, Coventry Cemetery 1858
- Memorial to J. Howells, Holy Trinity Church, Coventry 1859
- St Patrick, Salter Street, Earlswood, west tower. 1860
- St Luke's Church, Blakenhall, Wolverhampton 1860 - 1861
- St James’ Church, Bulkington, chancel arch and organ chamber arch 1865
- Milverton Lawn (now The Sunshine Home), Warwick New Road, Leamington Spa, Warwickshire 1860 - 1870
- East side of Cadogan Square 1879
- Esher Place, Surrey 1890s
