= Federation of Stoke-on-Trent =

1910 local government amalgamation in North Staffordshire, England

The federation of Stoke-on-Trent was the 1910 amalgamation of the six Staffordshire Potteries towns of Burslem, Tunstall, Stoke-upon-Trent, Hanley, Fenton and Longton into the single county borough of Stoke-on-Trent. The federation was one of the largest mergers of local authorities, involving the greatest number of previously separate urban authorities, to take place in England between the 19th century and the 1960s. (Note: Jenkins (1963, p. 252) lists the federation of Stoke-on-Trent as unique, as the publication precedes the recommendations of the Local Government Commission for England (1958–1967). However, there were other mergers involving multiple urban authorities being united around the same time, notably including the expansion of Birmingham to take in five neighbouring districts in 1911, and the merger of Plymouth with Devonport and East Stonehouse in 1914. Following the Local Government Commission of 1958–1967 more county boroughs were created by federation, for example the County Borough of Warley created by the Local Government (West Midlands) Order 1965 (SI 1965 No. 2139) and the County Borough of Teesside created by the Teesside Order 1967 (SI 1967 No. 396).) The 1910 federation was the culmination of a process of urban growth and municipal change that started in the early 19th century.

Little interaction between the separate settlements occurred until the 18th century when the pottery industry began to expand rapidly. By the early 19th century, initial steps had been made to ensure greater co-operation between the Potteries towns over the issue of law and order. The county plan of 1888 made the first attempts to form the six towns into one county borough, following an act of Parliament that restructured the county system and created the administrative county of Staffordshire. Wishing to remain independent, the Potteries towns discussed uniting to form a separate county, the Staffordshire Potteries. When it became apparent that such a move would fail, the proposal was revised to one of uniting the six towns into one county borough. This plan failed after Hanley Corporation and Stoke Corporation could not agree on the location of the future administrative centre. Instead, only Hanley gained county borough status because the other towns did not meet the criteria for such designation.

The first federation attempt was made in 1900 with a resurrection of the county plan. In 1902, Hanley Council led attempts to form an expanded county borough, but disagreement over the complex financial issues of rates, assets and loans caused Fenton to pull out, quickly followed by Burslem and Stoke, and the proposal was abandoned in 1903. The second and final federation process, between 1905 and 1910, was instigated by Longton Town Council with support from Stoke and Hanley and opposition from Fenton, Tunstall and Burslem. Issues again arose over the financial settlement and discussions continued during the progress of the Federation Bill through Parliament. The bill was passed in the House of Commons and was still under debate in the House of Lords when the six towns announced that they had come to an agreement. Passed in December 1908, the act came into force on 31 March 1910. The new Stoke-on-Trent was a county borough from then until 1974. In addition, city status was granted to Stoke-on-Trent by King George V on 1 July 1925.

== Background ==
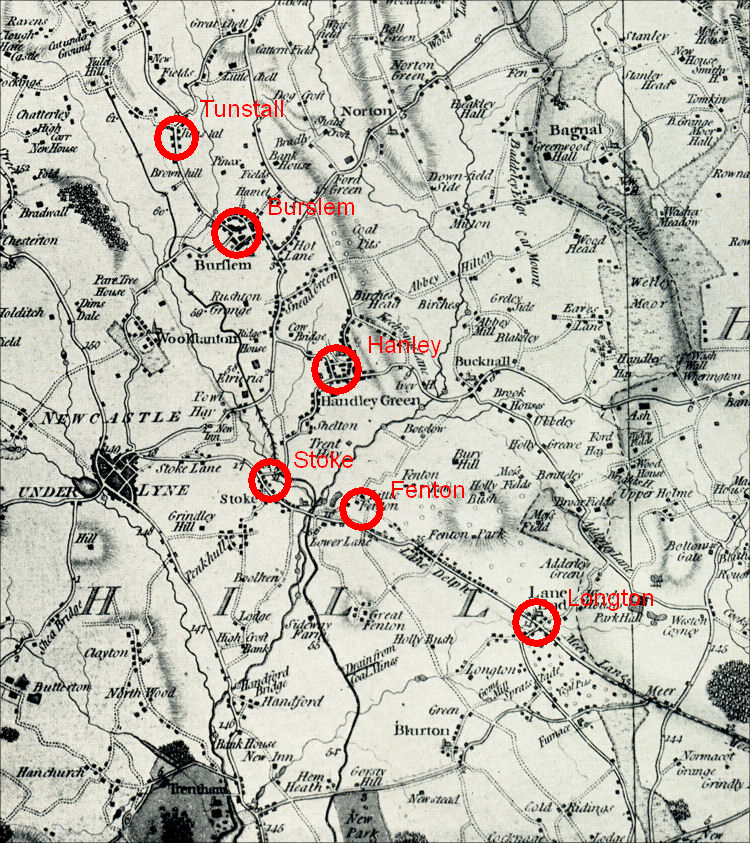
North Staffordshire in 1775. The six towns can be seen running roughly in a line north west to south east with Tunstall furthest north and Longton at the south end.

By the early part of the 19th century the six towns that eventually became Stoke-on-Trent—Burslem, Tunstall, Stoke-upon-Trent, Hanley, Fenton and Longton—were all established settlements. Despite occupying only a small geographic area and all based around the pottery industry, there was little political or social co-operation between them.

Prior to the 19th century, local government remained largely based on the parochial and manorial systems in use since the Middle Ages. In the Potteries towns this led to each of the townships having varying forms of government. Tunstall was parochially within Wolstanton and manorially part of Tunstall manor; Burslem, although manorially a part of Tunstall manor, parochially was part of Burslem parish. It was through these failing regimes, such as the 1813 lapse of the manorial court of Tunstall, that the long process towards federation began.

The earliest changes were seen in Hanley and Burslem when the Hanley Market Act 1813 (53 Geo. 3. c. cxv) gave statutory control of Hanley market to a board of trustees outside manorial control. The Hanley and Shelton Improvement Act 1825 (6 Geo. 4. c. lxxiii) and the Burslem Markets, Lighting and Police Act 1825 (6 Geo. 4. c. cxxxi), for Hanley and Burslem respectively, gave a board of commissioners control over policing and lighting along with the ability to levy rates for these purposes. Important steps as they were, none were directed towards any form of co-operation between Burslem, Hanley or any other of the Potteries towns.

== Early proposals for co-operation ==
The first tentative step towards co-operation was taken in 1817, when a meeting in Hanley mooted "future joint public meetings called by the head constables of the various settlements to be held in Hanley". This was the first instance of a call for greater law and order in the Potteries, although there seemed to be little interest in other forms of co-operation.

Apart from the establishment of the boards of commissioners in Hanley and Burslem, no further changes occurred until the 1830s when passing of the Reform Act 1832 (2 & 3 Will. 4. c. 45) sparked renewed interest in incorporation. The act created the parliamentary borough of Stoke-upon-Trent, which would elect two members to Parliament. Together with Stoke-upon-Trent itself, the parliamentary borough also comprised Burslem, Fenton, Hanley, Lane End, (Note: Lane End became part of the borough of Longton in 1865.) Shelton, the hamlet of Sneyd, Rushton Grange and Tunstall. The significance of the act was that for the first time and for one important reason only, through the election of Members of Parliament, the townships of the Potteries effectively became one. Shortly after the Reform Act came into effect, a Municipal Corporations Bill was introduced which proposed that the new parliamentary boroughs should be granted charters of incorporation. The bill failed with the prorogation of that Parliament, while the Potteries were excluded from the reforms of the later Municipal Corporations Act 1835 (5 & 6 Will. 4. c. 76). Interest in incorporation was sufficient for several meetings on the subject to take place; the Staffordshire Advertiser reported after one meeting in Burslem that incorporation would lead to one town having undue control over the affairs of the others, a theme that was to recur for many years. The same meeting revisited a topic raised pre–1820, the promotion of law and order in the Potteries, and called for the appointment of a stipendiary magistrate.

Only two years later the people of Fenton voted in favour of incorporation of the borough, while further meetings in Stoke and Burslem came out against incorporation but reiterated calls for the appointment of a stipendiary magistrate. Later the same year, a further call for better policing was made at a meeting chaired by the Duke of Sutherland. These calls were heard and in 1839 two acts of Parliament were passed, the Staffordshire Potteries Stipendiary Justice Act 1839 (2 & 3 Vict. c. 15) and the Staffordshire Potteries Improvement and Police Act 1839 (2 & 3 Vict. c. xliv). This legislation created additional boards of commissioners for Fenton, Longton and Stoke, with the same powers given to Hanley and Burslem by the 1825 acts. Following these amendments to local policing and justice, the discussion of co-operation and federation between the various townships was subdued for several decades.

== County plan of 1888 ==
Changes in local government between 1840 and 1888 saw the end of the parochial and manorial systems. The townships of Stoke-upon-Trent, Penkhull and Boothen were formed into the borough of Stoke-upon-Trent in 1874 while Longton and Lane End became the borough of Longton in 1865. Hanley and Shelton became the borough of Hanley in 1857 and Burslem became a borough in 1878. In Tunstall (1855) and Fenton (1873), the boards of commissioners were superseded by local boards of health.

Introduction of the Local Government Bill in March 1888 caused much debate in the Potteries about the position of the towns under the proposed council structure. The bill proposed the creation of county councils across England and Wales and the granting of county borough status to towns with a population exceeding 100,000. County borough status would allow such places to govern themselves independently of the county council.

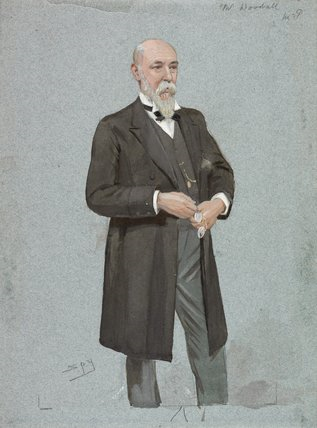
William Woodall, MP for Hanley at the time of the county plan

Consensus in the Potteries was against coming under the control of Staffordshire County Council and the idea developed of the Potteries seeking to become a county in their own right. Accordingly, a proposal was submitted to the Local Government Board on 2 July 1888 for the creation of a county of the Staffordshire Potteries. However, on 9 July 1888 it was proposed to amend the bill to reduce the population requirement for county borough status from 100,000 to only 50,000, which if adopted would have allowed Hanley to become a county borough of its own right, while the rest of the towns would have come under the control of Staffordshire. On 13 July 1888, Captain Heathcote, MP for Staffordshire North West, moved an amendment to the bill that "[t]he district of the Staffordshire Potteries, comprising the municipal boroughs of Hanley, Stoke-upon-Trent, Longton, and Burslem, the urban sanitary district of the Fenton Local Board of Health, and the urban sanitary district of the Tunstall Local Board of Health, the six towns comprising the Pottery District should be formed into a county". In response, the President of the Local Government Board, Charles Ritchie, proposed the matter be resolved by way of a provisional order bill in the next parliamentary session and that he would undertake to introduce such a bill. William Woodall, MP for Hanley, supported the amendment but accepted Ritchie's assurance. However, he was also bound to protect Hanley's interests and moved that Hanley be added to the proposed list of county boroughs under the Local Government (England and Wales) Bill, but would surrender that right if all of the Potteries were to become a county borough or county in their own right. Ritchie re-iterated his hope that the matter could be resolved by way of provisional order bill and with that both amendments were withdrawn.

The Local Government Act 1888 received royal assent on 13 August 1888 with Hanley listed among those places to be granted county borough status. The corporation of Hanley vacillated for several months as to how best to proceed, then in February 1889 opted for Hanley to take its county borough status, effectively killing both the county proposal and the county borough proposal. Why Hanley corporation made such a decision is not recorded, but it was reported in the Staffordshire Sentinel of 5 February 1901 that it was because Stoke Corporation insisted that the administrative centre of the new county be in Stoke, not Hanley, and this was something that Hanley could not agree to.

The following year Longton Town Council proposed the formation of a county borough comprising Stoke, Fenton and Longton but the proposal came to nothing.

== First federation proposal 1900–1903 ==
In December 1900, Stoke Town Council proposed a meeting with "a view to federal action" and issued invitations to the boroughs of Burslem, Hanley, Longton, and Newcastle-under-Lyme; the urban districts of Audley, Fenton, (Note: Fenton became an urban district in 1894 under the provisions of the Local Government Act 1894 (56 & 57 Vict c. 73).) Kidsgrove, Smallthorne, and Tunstall; (Note: Tunstall became an urban district in 1894 under the provisions of the Local Government Act 1894 (56 & 57 Vict c. 73).) and the rural districts of Stoke and Wolstanton. The parishes of Chesterton, Chell, Goldenhill, Milton and Silverdale were also invited. The meeting took place in February 1901 and resolved "that it was desirable in the interests of North Staffordshire to form a federation of local authorities", thereby indicating a preference for implementation of the county plan. Legal opinion suggested that the county plan was unlikely to succeed and that a more viable proposition would be to expand the county borough of Hanley to include the other Potteries towns. Accordingly, in March 1902, representatives of the four boroughs and two urban districts met and agreed unanimously that "the principle of federation of the Pottery towns by the constitution of a county borough should be adopted, subject to the resolutions passed by each authority for the preservation of their respective interests."

Hanley council made a formal proposal in 1902 to the Local Government Board for the expansion of the County Borough of Hanley to include Burslem, Fenton, Longton, Stoke and Tunstall and also two other districts; Smallthorne Urban District, Wolstanton Rural District, and seven parishes; Caverswall, Chell, Goldenhill, Milton, Stoke Rural, Stone and Trentham.

Only Longton council supported the idea as concurrently, Sir Hugh Owen, a former secretary to the Local Government Board, presented the six towns committee with a scheme of financial adjustment. Under this proposal, the net assets of each town would be calculated by deducting outstanding debts and liabilities from the values of its various properties. The proportion each town needed to contribute to the overall value of the county borough was then to be calculated. If the value of the net assets to be contributed by a town was less than the proportion calculated as due from that town towards the overall sum, then that town would need to set a higher general rate to be paid by the ratepayers of that town. Conversely, towns contributing a value of net assets greater than their proportion of the overall sum would be able to set a lower general rate.

While five of the towns awaited a report from Alderman Frederick Geen of Stoke on the implications of the Owen proposal, Fenton council decided that it would impose undue financial hardship on the ratepayers of the district as the net assets of the district would show a deficiency and therefore a higher rate would have to be set. Fenton district council could not accept such a move and withdrew from the discussions on federation forthwith. Geen's July 1903 report increased opposition to the idea of federation, while a poll of ratepayers in Burslem came out strongly against federation. Burslem council then withdrew from the scheme to be followed shortly afterwards by Stoke. Faced by such strong opposition, Hanley council felt compelled to withdraw its submission to the Local Government Board bringing the first attempt at federation in the twentieth century to an unsuccessful conclusion.

== Second federation proposal 1905–1910 ==
At a conference of local authorities held in 1905, delegates from Longton again raised the issue of confederation but their proposal was not well received. Undaunted, the Longton delegates amended their suggestion to: "On the grounds of sanitation, education, and other matters of common interest it is desirable that the parliamentary borough of Stoke-upon-Trent should be formed into one municipal borough on some equitable basis, and that the other authorities concerned be invited to take the subject into their consideration" The parliamentary borough of Stoke-upon-Trent consisted of Longton, Stoke and Fenton. (Note: Under the Redistribution of Seats Act 1885 (48 & 49 Vict c. 23) the old parliamentary borough of Stoke-upon-Trent had been split into two single seat constituencies: Stoke-upon-Trent comprising Stoke, Longton and Fenton, and Hanley comprising Hanley, Burslem and Tunstall.) While Stoke town council was in favour, the voters of Fenton were not and voted overwhelmingly against the proposal.

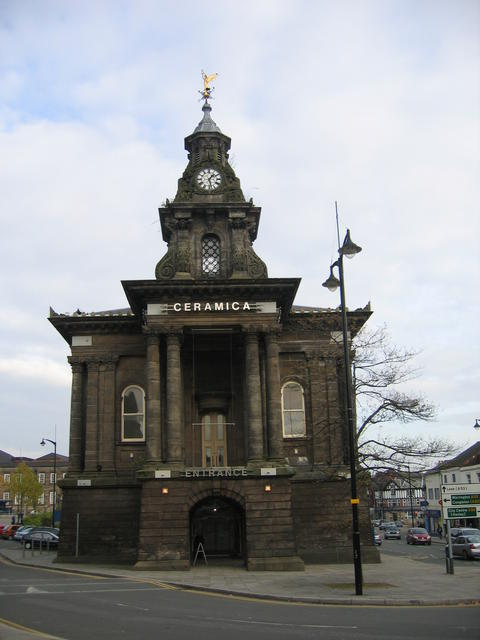
Burslem Town Hall, scene of many ballots and debates during the Federation process

Despite this setback, Longton and Stoke submitted their proposal to the Local Government Board in early 1907. A local inquiry was held soon afterwards in Stoke, which reported back quickly and in April 1907 informed both Stoke and Longton councils that the proposed scheme was not sufficiently comprehensive and suggested holding another conference between the six towns to discuss a more complete proposal. The meeting took place in July and was addressed by John Burns, president of the Local Government Board, who called for a number of local conferences to agree a scheme for federation of all six towns.

These were duly held everywhere except Tunstall, where the council refused to participate. Fenton council made it clear that it would not back any proposal that did not have the support of its electorate. In Burslem, a high turnout of 74 per cent of voters delivered a vote of 3:2 against federation. The Staffordshire Advertiser described the events surrounding this poll with both proponents and opponents – chiefly the Association for Promoting the Federation of the Pottery Towns and the Burslem Anti-Federation League – making every effort to ensure their supporters voted. An indication of the strength of feeling and interest in the proposal is that the events surrounding the federation proposal were used as a background setting by the author Arnold Bennett in his contemporary (1908) novel The Old Wives' Tale. With Fenton, Tunstall and Burslem all opposing federation it was left to Hanley, Stoke and Longton to submit proposals to the Local Government Board. The Local Government Board ruled that only the submission made by Longton met the statutory and other formal requirements and that it alone would form the basis of the subsequent local inquiry, held in January 1908.

Before the inquiry opened, a poll was conducted in Tunstall where ratepayers of the town showed themselves to be in favour of federation. As the council itself had voted against federation, it decided not to oppose or support federation but instead to achieve the best deal it could for the town. The three-day inquiry opened on 8 January 1908 and was chaired by Major Norton of the Local Government Board. Norton's appointment itself caused controversy with the delegation from Burslem walking out on the first day protesting that Norton had already declared himself in favour of federation. The walkout did not disrupt the hearing but left only Fenton and Staffordshire County Council opposed to the plan, with Tunstall neutral and Hanley, Stoke and Longton in favour. The bulk of the inquiry examined rating schemes based largely on the Owen or Geen proposals from the previous federation attempt.

On 23 February 1908, less than six weeks after the inquiry closed, the Local Government Board issued a draft provisional bill for the federation of the six towns. This was not unexpected but the rating scheme proposed differed from the schemes discussed during the inquiry and included a complicated valuation of the properties belonging to each municipality, something that none of the towns wished to carry out. Nevertheless, Hanley, Longton and Tunstall all supported the draft order while Stoke, Fenton and Burslem opposed it.

Once the draft order had been issued, the locus of the process moved from the Potteries to London with the Local Government Provisional Order (No. 3) Bill introduced in the House of Commons in July 1908 by the Select Committee on Private Bills chaired by Sir George White. The bill received its third reading on 31 July 1908 but had undergone significant amendment during its passage through the House of Commons, most notably in the introduction of a complex, differential rating system (Note: A differential rating system was preferred to avoid vast increases in rates for the poorer towns as they attempted to meet one-sixth of the new rateable value of the borough. Instead, each town would pay a proportion based on its average rates in the preceding three years. The system proposed also included payments based on the net value of each town's assets – for example, gas works, public buildings and recreational areas – as a proportion of the total asset value of the borough. Any town whose assets contributed less than one-sixth of the total asset values of the new borough would have to make up the difference over 10 years. However, any town whose assets contributed more than one-sixth of the total would not receive a credit for the excess.) for a period of 10 years. Few of the interested parties were pleased with the proposal and, although the differential system was welcomed, a period of 20 years was preferred with the complicated valuation required of all public assets proving unpopular. As a result, Tunstall withdrew its support for the order leaving only Hanley and Longton to promote the bill in the House of Lords. Neither council was particularly in favour of the financial settlement but felt honour bound to promote the bill, having been the initial instigators of the scheme. Petitions objecting to the bill were submitted to the House of Lords by Staffordshire County Council, Burslem, Fenton, Stoke, and Tunstall councils, the Longton justices, the North Staffordshire Railway Company, and individual Tunstall ratepayers.

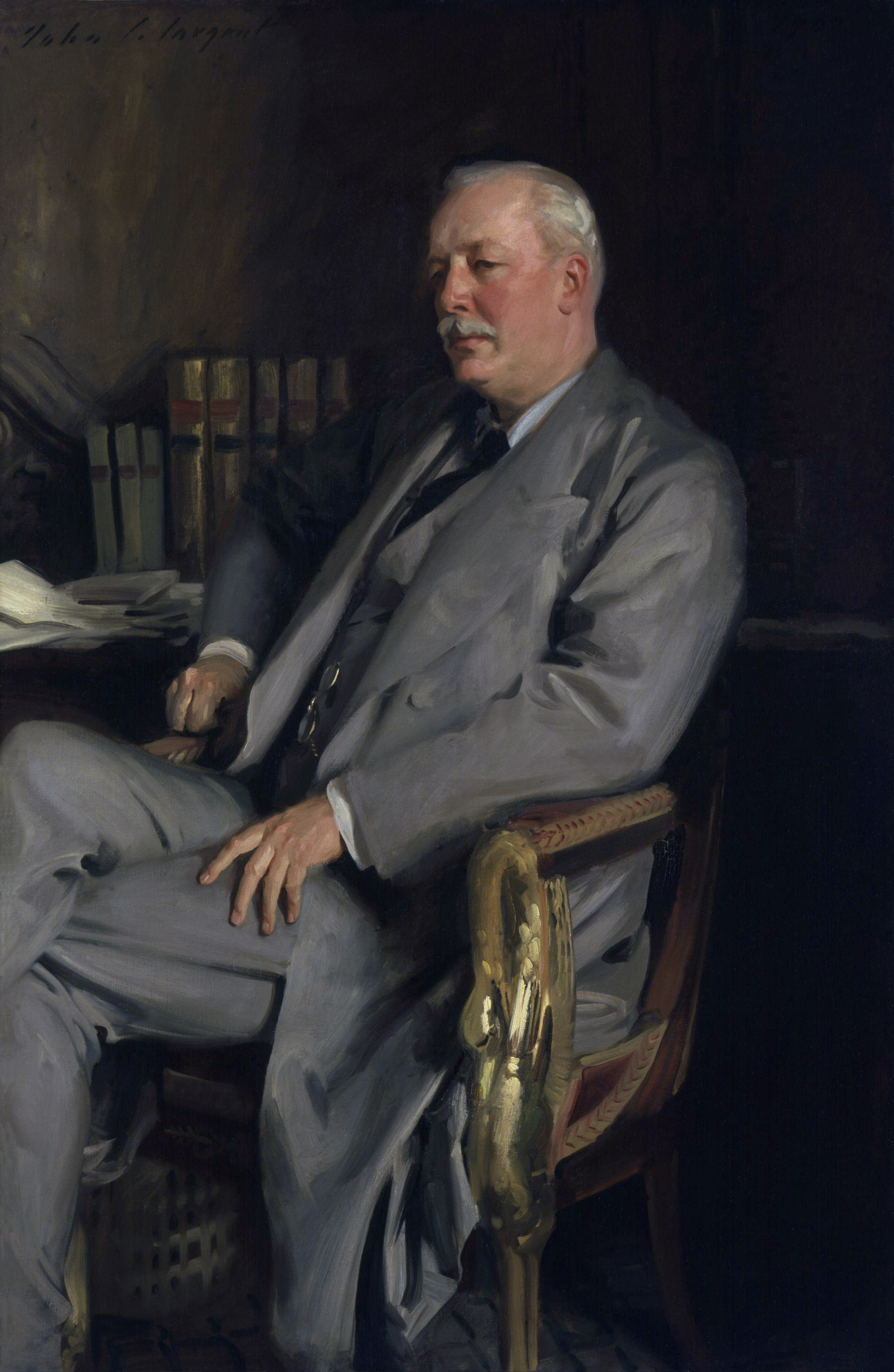
Lord Cromer, chairman of the House of Lords select committee

The House of Lords select committee assigned to deal with the bill was chaired by Lord Cromer and sat during November and December 1908. After several sessions, the committee declared several important decisions. It reaffirmed that federation would benefit of the people of the Potteries, that a differential rating system for a fixed period was required, that asset valuation in each town should be abandoned, and that the committee reserved the right to decide a course of action should the parties not be able to reach agreement. This last point was important because without it all disputes would have to be passed back either to the Local Government Board or the House of Commons. With prorogation of the current parliament on the horizon, this would have led to delays that jeopardised the passage of the whole bill through Parliament during that parliamentary session.

On 16 December 1908, less than a week after the committee made its announcement, the six towns informed the committee that an agreement had been reached and that a differential rating system for the next 20 years had been settled on. (Note: The agreement provided for general rates being levied on a proportional basis. Hanley was set as an index at 100 for a period of 20 years, with Burslem (94), Stoke (87), Longton (86), Tunstall (86) and Fenton (79) paying the appropriate percentage. The rates set had to ensure that the county borough as a whole collected the amount it required to meet its general expenditure and excluded rates levied for poor law relief as these were set independently.) No valuation of assets would be undertaken and each town was responsible for discharging any outstanding loans as of 31 December 1907. At this point the committee redrafted the bill according to the terms agreed by the towns and it was passed by the House of Lords on 19 December 1908. Returned to the House of Commons the bill was passed by the Commons the same day, with royal assent being received on 21 December 1908. The Local Government Provisional Order (No. 3) Confirmation Act (8 Edw. 7 c.clxiv) came into force on 31 March 1910 with the new council consisting of 78 councillors representing 26 wards. The new council as one of its first actions voted Cecil Wedgwood to be the first mayor of the county borough of Stoke-on-Trent. Wedgwood had previously been appointed acting mayor (primarily to act as returning officer for the first municipal elections) by the Local Government Board. So as not to show bias towards any of the six town halls, the council held its inaugural meeting at the North Stafford Hotel.

On 1 July 1925 the county borough of Stoke-on-Trent became the City of Stoke-on-Trent under letters patent from King George V dated 5 June 1925.

== Summary of predecessor authorities ==
Place	Previous urban authorities	Dates	Population in 1901
Burslem	Improvement Commissioners District	1825–1878	38,766
Burslem	Municipal Borough	1878–1910	38,766
Fenton	Improvement Commissioners District	1839–1863	22,742
Fenton	Local Government District	1863–1894	22,742
Fenton	Urban District	1894–1910	22,742
Hanley	Improvement Commissioners District	1825–1857	61,599
Hanley	Municipal Borough	1857–1889	61,599
Hanley	County Borough	1889–1910	61,599
Longton	Improvement Commissioners District	1839–1865	35,815
Longton	Municipal Borough	1865–1910	35,815
Stoke-upon-Trent	Improvement Commissioners District	1839–1874	30,458
Stoke-upon-Trent	Municipal Borough	1874–1910	30,458
Tunstall	Local Board District	1855–1894	19,492
Tunstall	Urban District	1894–1910	19,492
