= George Gilbert Scott =

English architect (1811–1878)

Sir Gilbert Scott RA
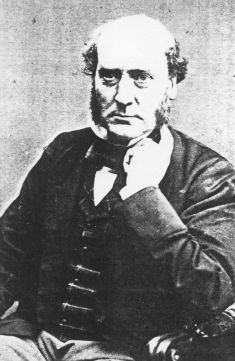
- Sir Gilbert Scott
- Born: 13 July 1811; Parsonage, Gawcott, Buckinghamshire, England
- Died: 27 March 1878 (aged 66); 39 Courtfield Gardens, South Kensington, London, England
- Occupation: Architect
- Children: 5 including: George Gilbert Scott Jr. John Oldrid Scott; Dukinfield Henry Scott
- Awards: Royal Gold Medal (1859)
- Buildings: Wakefield Cathedral; Albert Memorial; Foreign and Commonwealth Office; Midland Grand Hotel; St Pancras railway station Main building of the University of Glasgow; St Nicholas Church, Hamburg; St Mary's Cathedral, Glasgow; St Mary's Cathedral, Edinburgh (Episcopal); King's College Chapel, London; Wanstead Infant Orphan Asylum

Sir George Gilbert Scott (13 July 1811 – 27 March 1878), largely known as Sir Gilbert Scott, was a prolific English Gothic Revival architect, chiefly associated with the design, building and renovation of churches and cathedrals, although he started his career as a leading designer of workhouses. Over 800 buildings were designed or altered by him.

Scott was the architect of many notable buildings, including the Midland Grand Hotel at St Pancras Station, the Albert Memorial, and the Foreign and Commonwealth Office, all in London, St Mary's Cathedral, Glasgow, the main building of the University of Glasgow, St Mary's Cathedral in Edinburgh and King's College Chapel, London.

== Life and career ==
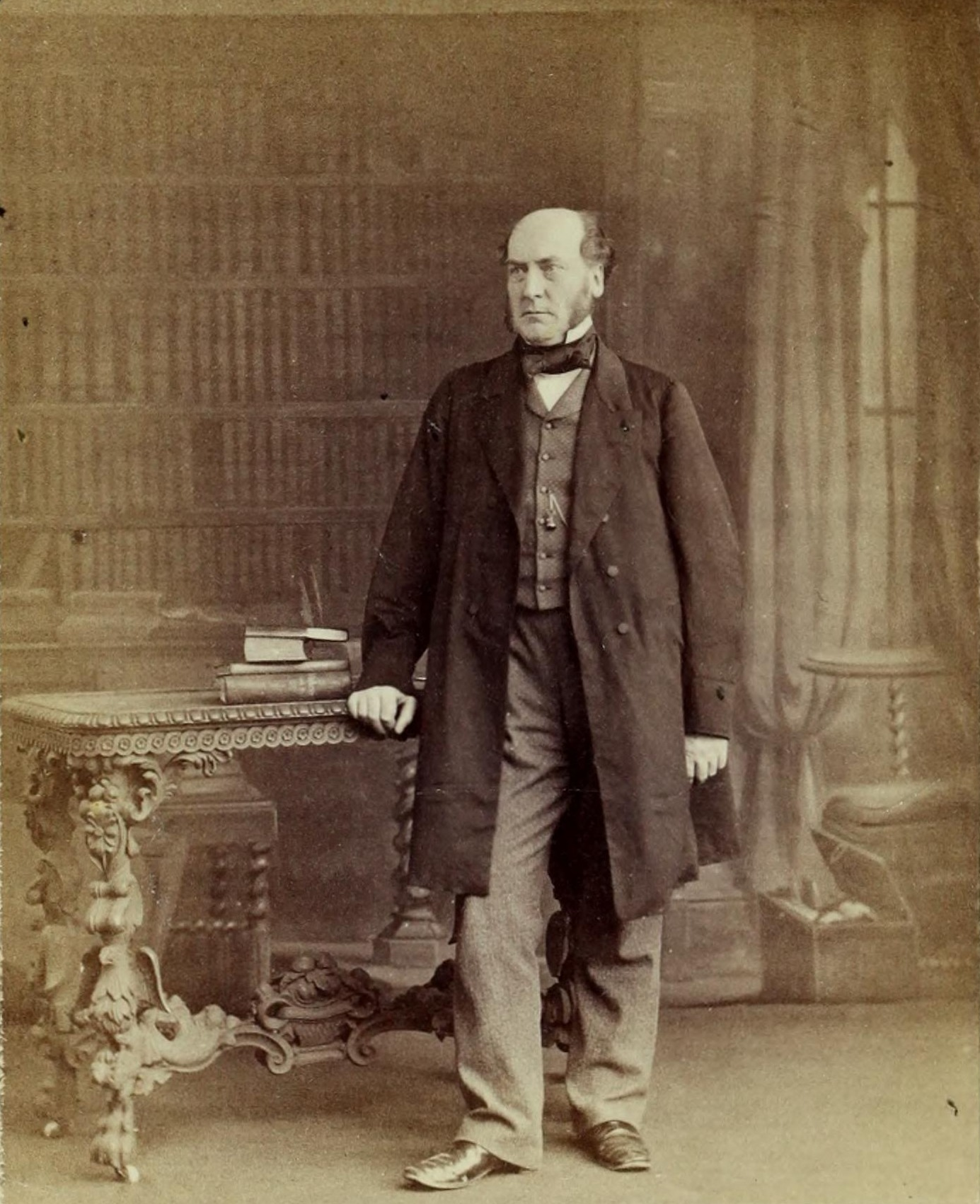
Scott in 1863

Born in Gawcott, Buckingham, Buckinghamshire, Scott was the son of the Reverend Thomas Scott (1780–1835) and grandson of the biblical commentator Thomas Scott. He studied architecture as a pupil of James Edmeston and, from 1832 to 1834, worked as an assistant to Henry Roberts. He also worked as an assistant for his friend, Sampson Kempthorne, who specialised in the design of workhouses, a field in which Scott was to begin his independent career.

=== Early work ===
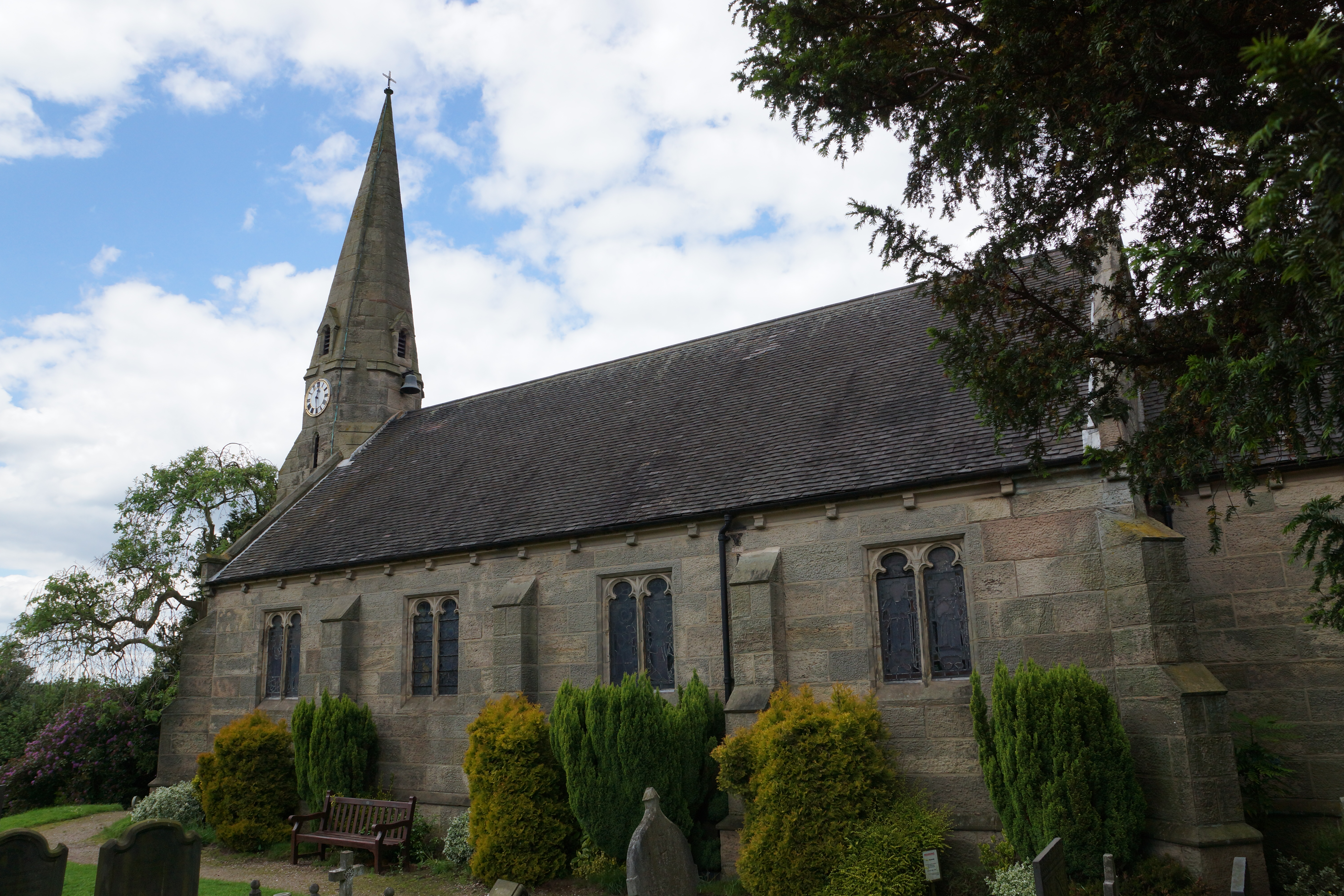
Parish Church of St John in Wall, Staffordshire

Scott's first work was built in 1833; it was a vicarage for his father in the village of Wappenham, Northamptonshire. It replaced the previous vicarage occupied by other relatives of Scott. Scott went on to design several other buildings in the village.

In about 1835, Scott took on William Bonython Moffatt as his assistant and later (1838–1845) as his partner. Over ten years or so, Scott and Moffatt designed more than forty workhouses in the wake of the Poor Law Amendment Act 1834. Their first churches were St Mary Magdalene at Flaunden, Herts (1838, for Samuel King, Scott's uncle); St Nicholas, Newport, Lincoln (1839); St John, Wall, Staffordshire (1839); and the Neo-Norman church of St Peter at Norbiton, Surrey (1841). They built Reading Gaol (1841–42) in a picturesque, castellated style.

=== Gothic Revival ===
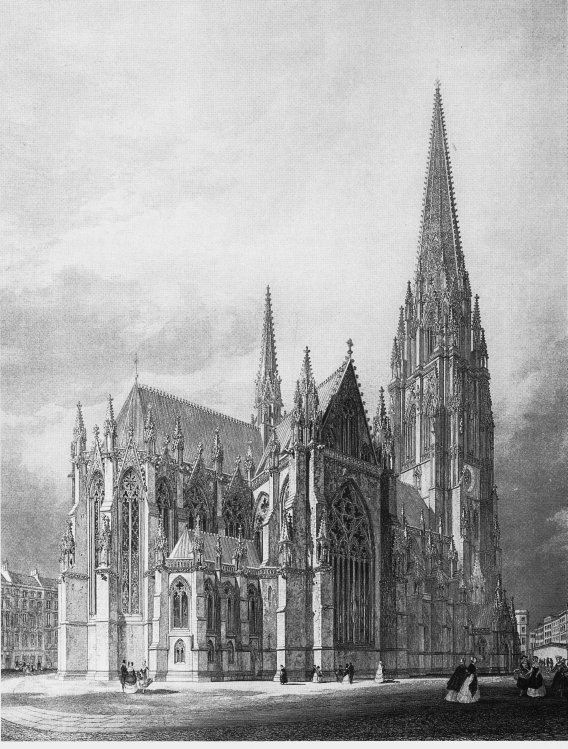
Nikolaikirche, Hamburg, Germany (1845–80), bombed during World War II and now a ruin

Meanwhile, he was inspired by Augustus Pugin to participate in the Gothic Revival. While still in partnership with Moffat. he designed the Martyrs' Memorial on St Giles', Oxford (1841), and St Giles' Church, Camberwell (1844), both of which helped establish his reputation within the movement.

Commemorating three Protestants burnt during the reign of Queen Mary, the Martyrs' Memorial was intended as a rebuke to those very high church tendencies which had been instrumental in promoting the new authentic approach to Gothic architecture. St Giles' was in plan, with its long chancel, of the type advocated by the Ecclesiological Society: Charles Locke Eastlake said that "in the neighbourhood of London no church of its time was considered in purer style or more orthodox in its arrangement". It did, however, like many churches of the time, incorporate wooden galleries, not used in medieval churches and highly disapproved of by the high church ecclesiological movement.

In 1844 he received the commission to rebuild the Nikolaikirche in Hamburg (completed 1863), following an international competition. Scott's design had originally been placed third in the competition, the winner being one in a Florentine inspired style by Gottfried Semper, but the decision was overturned by a faction who favoured a Gothic design. Scott's entry had been the only design in the Gothic style.

In 1854 he remodelled the Camden Chapel in Camberwell, a project in which the critic John Ruskin took a close interest and made many suggestions. He added an apse, in a Byzantine style, integrating it to the existing plain structure by substituting a waggon roof for the existing flat ceiling.

Scott was appointed architect to Westminster Abbey in 1849, and in 1853 he built a Gothic terraced block adjoining the abbey in Broad Sanctuary. In 1858 he designed ChristChurch Cathedral, Christchurch, New Zealand which now lies partly ruined following the earthquake in 2011 and subsequent attempts by the Anglican Church authorities to demolish it. Demolition was blocked after appeals by the people of Christchurch, and in September 2017 the Christchurch Diocesan Synod announced that the cathedral would be reinstated.

The choir stalls at Lancing College in Sussex, which Scott designed with Walter Tower, were among many examples of his work that incorporated the Green Man.

Later, Scott went beyond copying mediaeval English Gothic for his Victorian Gothic or Gothic Revival buildings, and began to introduce features from other styles and European countries as evidenced in his Midland red-brick construction, the Midland Grand Hotel at London's St Pancras Station, from which approach Scott believed a new style might emerge.

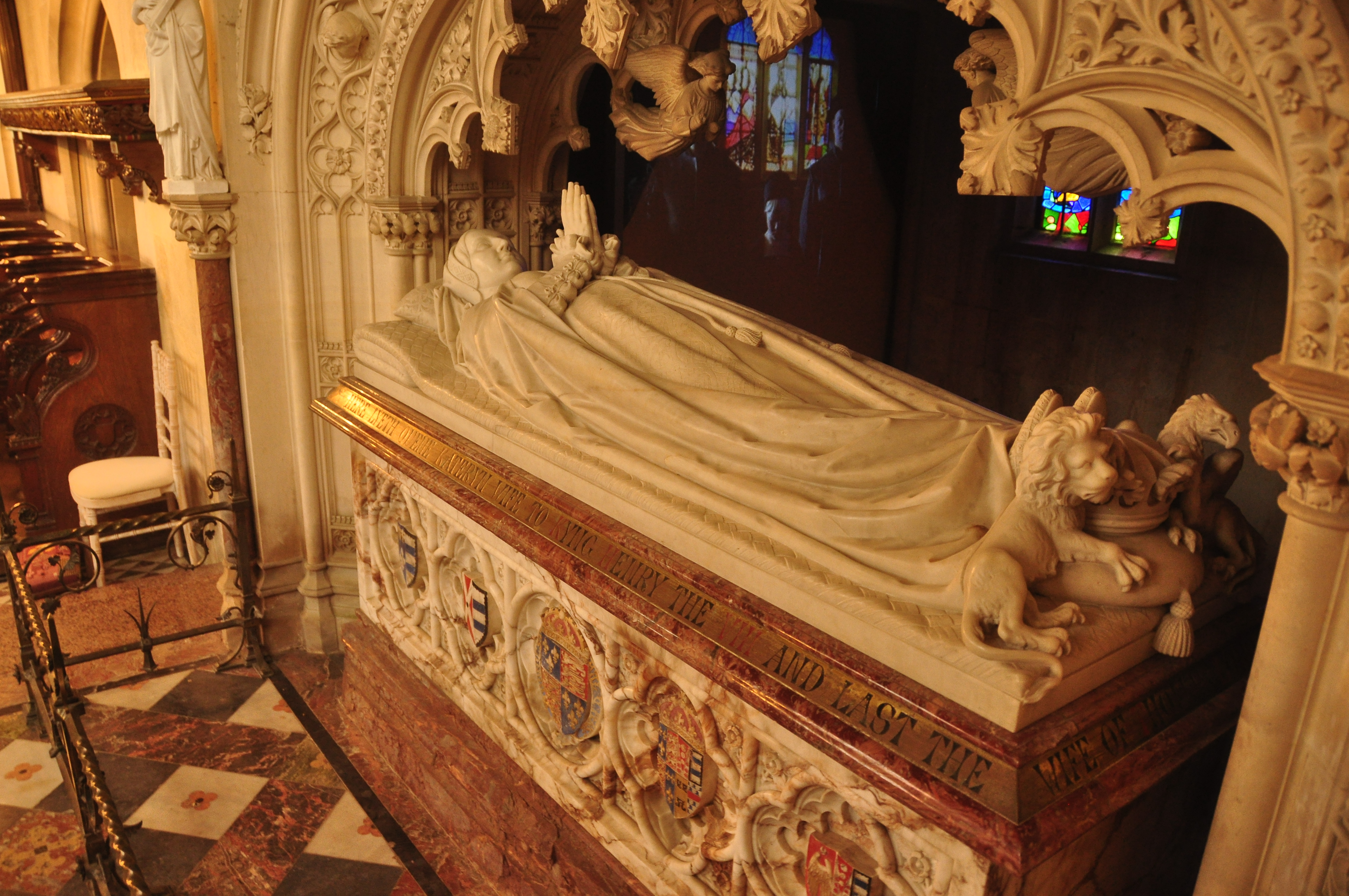
Tomb of Catherine Parr, designed by Gilbert Scott

In 1863, after restoration of the chapel at Sudeley Castle, the remains of Queen Catherine Parr were placed in a new neo-Gothic canopied tomb designed by Gilbert Scott and created by sculptor John Birnie Philip.

Between 1864 and 1876, the Albert Memorial, designed by Scott, was constructed in Hyde Park. It was a commission on behalf of Queen Victoria in memory of her husband, Prince Albert.

Scott advocated the use of Gothic architecture for secular buildings, rejecting what he called "the absurd supposition that Gothic architecture is exclusively and intrinsically ecclesiastical." He was the winner of a competition to design new buildings in Whitehall to house the Foreign Office and War Office. Before work began, however, the administration which had approved his plans went out of office. Palmerston, the new Prime Minister, objected to Scott's use of the Gothic, and the architect – after some resistance – drew up new plans in a more acceptable style.

Scott designed the memorial to Thomas Clarkson in Wisbech, where his brother Rev John Scott was vicar. The Clarkson Memorial was completed after his death under the direction of his son John in 1881.

== Honours ==
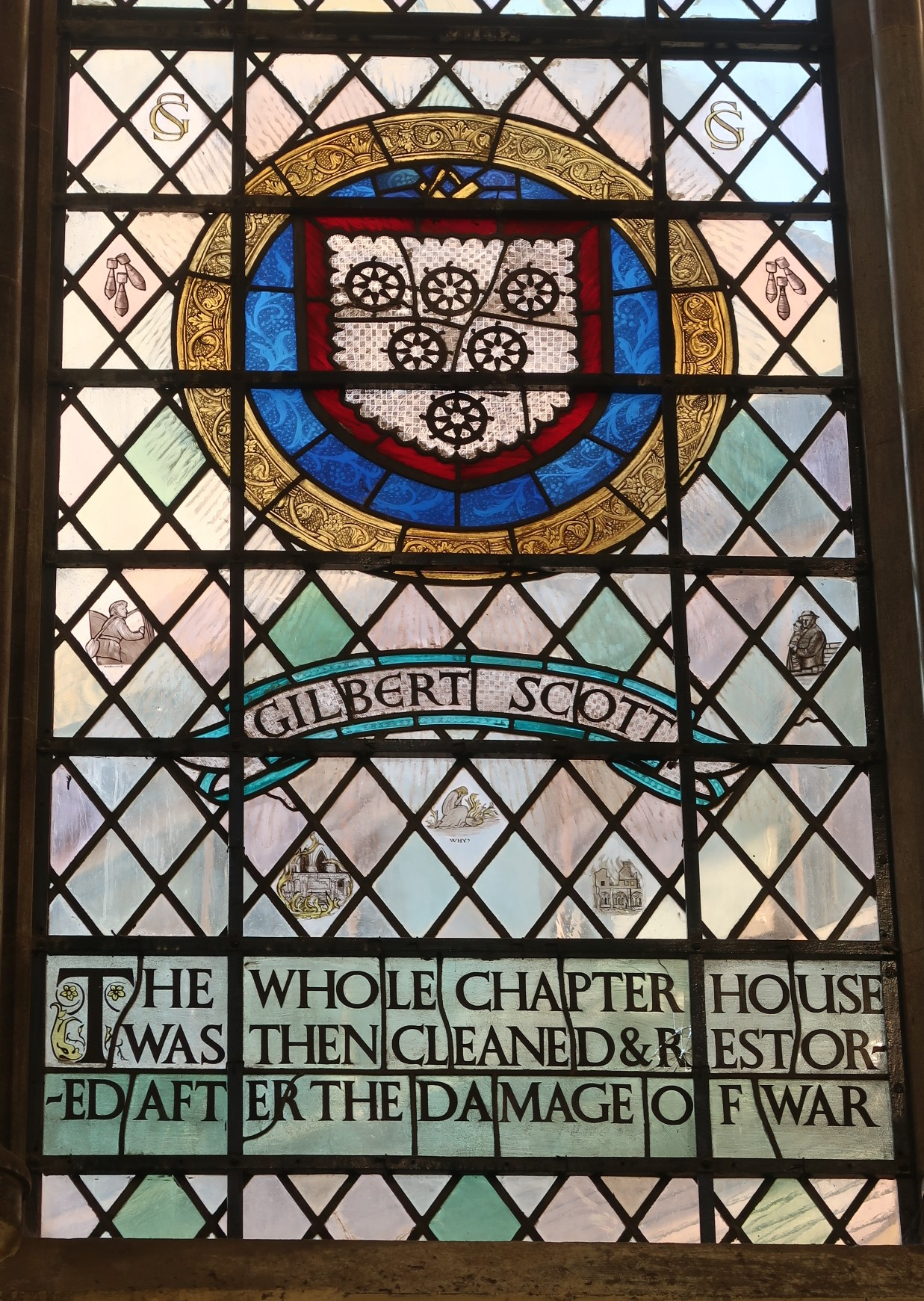
Commemorative window in the Chapter House of Westminster Abbey, London

Scott was awarded the RIBA's Royal Gold Medal in 1859. He was appointed an Honorary Liveryman of the Turners' Company; and on 9 August 1872 he was knighted, choosing the style Sir Gilbert Scott. He died in 1878 and is buried in Westminster Abbey.

A London County Council "blue plaque" (in fact brown) was placed in 1910 to mark Scott's residence at the Admiral's House on Admiral's Walk in Hampstead.

== Family ==
Scott married Caroline Oldrid of Boston in 1838. Two of his sons George Gilbert Scott, Jr. (founder of Watts & Company in 1874) and John Oldrid Scott, and his grandson Giles Gilbert Scott, were also prominent architects. His third son, photographer, Albert Henry Scott (1844–65) died at the age of twenty-one; George Gilbert designed his funerary monument in St Peter's Church, Petersham, whilst he was living at The Manor House at Ham in Richmond. His fifth and youngest son was the botanist Dukinfield Henry Scott. He was also great-uncle of the architect Elisabeth Scott.

== Pupils ==
Scott's success attracted a large number of pupils and many would go on to have successful careers of their own, not always as architects. Some notable pupils are as follows, their time in Scott's office shown after their name: Hubert Austin (1868), Joseph Maltby Bignell (1859–78), George Frederick Bodley (1845–56), Charles Buckeridge (1856–57), Somers Clarke (1865), William Henry Crossland (dates uncertain), C. Hodgson Fowler (1856–60), Thomas Garner (1856–61), Thomas Graham Jackson (1858–61), John T. Micklethwaite (1862–69), Benjamin Mountfort (1841–46), Ralph Nevill (dates uncertain), John Norton (1870–78), George Gilbert Scott, Jr. (1856–63), John Oldrid Scott (1858–78), J. J. Stevenson (1858–60), George Edmund Street (1844–49), and William White (1845–47).

== Books ==
- Remarks on secular & domestic architecture, present & future. London: John Murray. 1857.
- A Plea for the Faithful Restoration of our Ancient Churches. Oxford: James Parker. 1859.
- Gleanings from Westminster Abbey / by George Gilbert Scott, with Appendices Supplying Further Particulars, and Completing the History of the Abbey Buildings, by W. Burges (2nd enlarged ed.). Oxford: John Henry and James Parker. 1863 [1861].
- Personal and Professional Recollections. London: Sampson Low & Co. 1879.
- Lectures on the Rise and Development of Medieval Architecture. Vol. I. London: John Murray. 1879.
- Lectures on the Rise and Development of Medieval Architecture. Vol. II. London: John Murray. 1879. online texts for vols. I & II

Additionally he wrote over forty pamphlets and reports. As well as publishing articles, letters, lectures and reports in The Builder, The Ecclesiologist, The Building News, The British Architect, The Civil Engineer's and Architect's Journal, The Illustrated London News, The Times and Transactions of the Royal Institute of British Architects.

== Architectural work ==
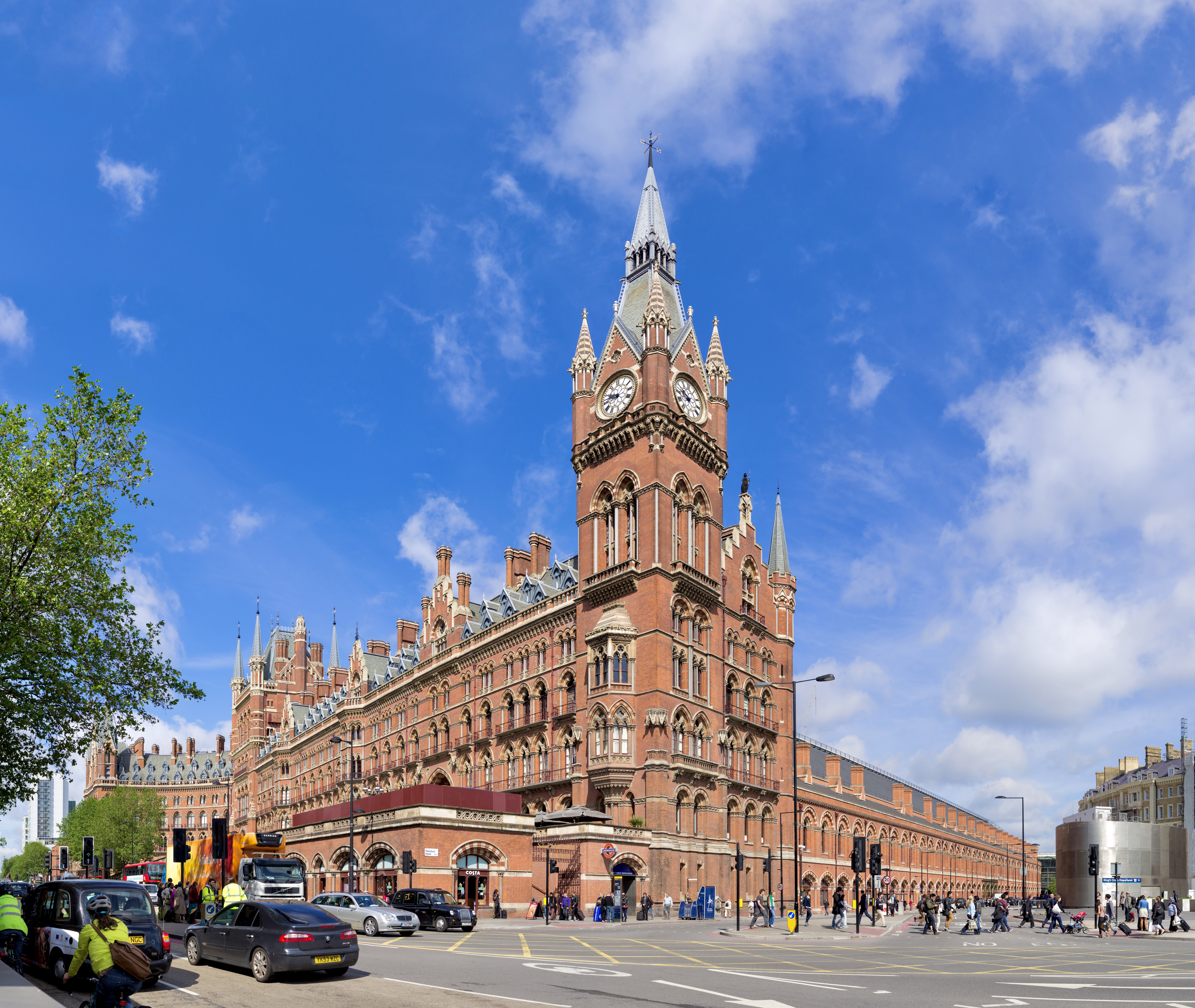
Although he is best known for his Gothic revival churches, Scott felt that the Midland Grand Hotel at St Pancras station was his most successful project

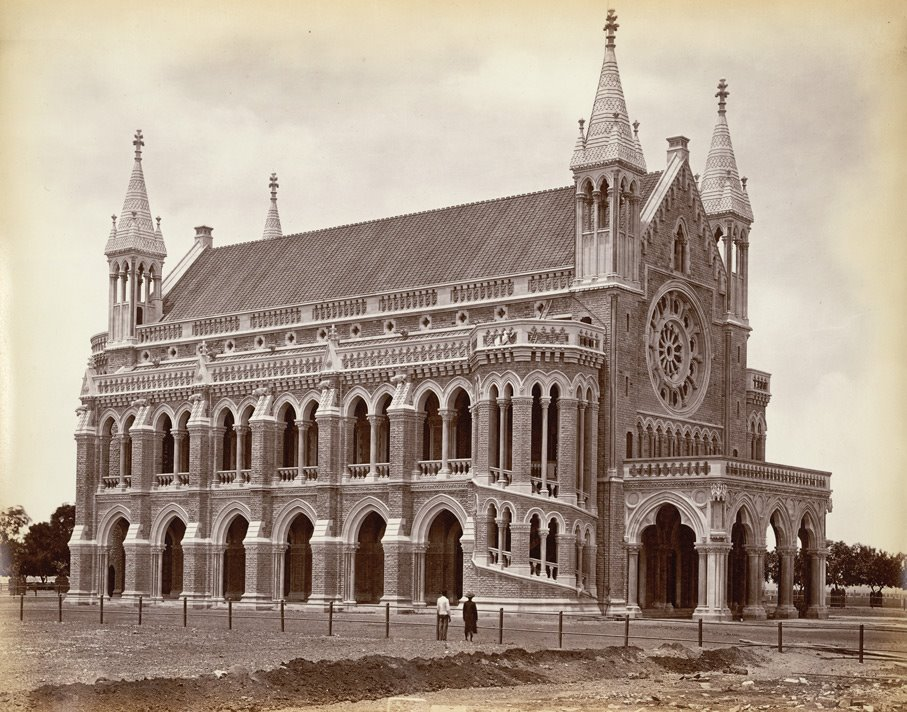
Scott designed the Mumbai University Convocation Hall (1870), working from London, and it is now part of the UNESCO World Heritage Site

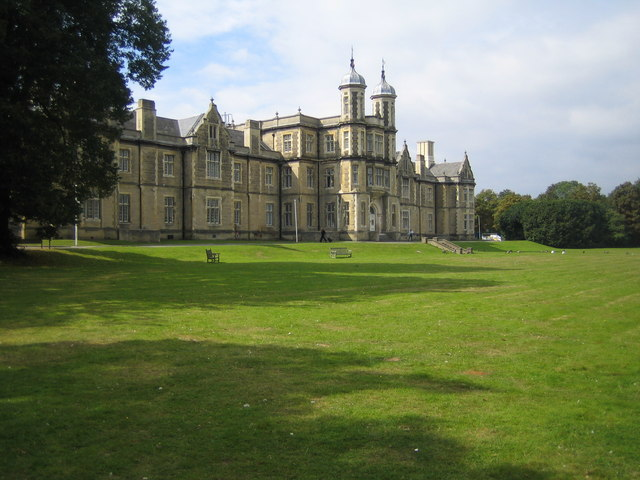
Wanstead Infant Orphan Asylum (1842), now Snaresbrook Crown Court

His projects include:

=== Public buildings ===
- Workhouse in Winslow, Buckinghamshire (1835)
- Workhouses (1836) in: Amesbury, Wiltshire; Buckingham, Buckinghamshire; Kettering, Northamptonshire; Northampton, Northamptonshire; Oundle, Northamptonshire; Tiverton, Devon; Totnes, Devon; Towcester, Northamptonshire
- Workhouse in Guildford, Surrey (1836–38)
- Workhouses (1837) in: Bideford, Devon; Boston, Lincolnshire; Clutton, Somerset; Flax Bourton, Somerset; Gloucester, Gloucestershire; Liskeard, Cornwall; Newton Abbot, Devon; Hundleby, Lincolnshire; Tavistock, Devon
- The workhouse in Loughborough, Leicestershire (1837–38)
- Workhouses (1838) in: Amersham, Buckinghamshire; Belper, Derbyshire; Great Dunmow, Essex; Lichfield, Staffordshire; Mere, Wiltshire; Penzance, Cornwall; Redruth, Cornwall
- Workhouse (1838); Williton, Somerset and 'sister design' Witham, Essex
- Workhouses (1839) in: Billericay, Essex; Bedworth, Warwickshire; Edmonton, London; Louth, Lincolnshire; Newcastle-under-Lyme, Staffordshire; Old Windsor, Berkshire; St Austell, Cornwall; Uttoxeter, Staffordshire
- Buckingham Gaol extension and alterations (1839) in: Buckingham, Buckinghamshire
- The workhouse in Lutterworth, Leicestershire (1839–40)
- School and Master's House, Hartshill, Stoke on Trent (1840)
- Infant Orphan Asylum, Wanstead, Essex (1841–43)
- Martyrs' Memorial, Oxford (1841–43)
- Reading Gaol, Berkshire (1842–44)
- Lunatic Asylum, Shelton, Shropshire (1843)
- The workhouse, Macclesfield, Cheshire (1843)
- Lunatic Asylum, Clifton, York (1845)
- Lunatic Asylum, Wells, Somerset (1845)
- Astbury School and Masters House Congleton (1848)
- Christ Church School, Alsager, Cheshire (1848)
- Brighton College, Sussex (1848–1866)
- Sandbach School, Sandbach, Cheshire (1849)
- School, Trefnant, Denbighshire (c. 1855)
- School, Tysoe, Warwickshire (1856)

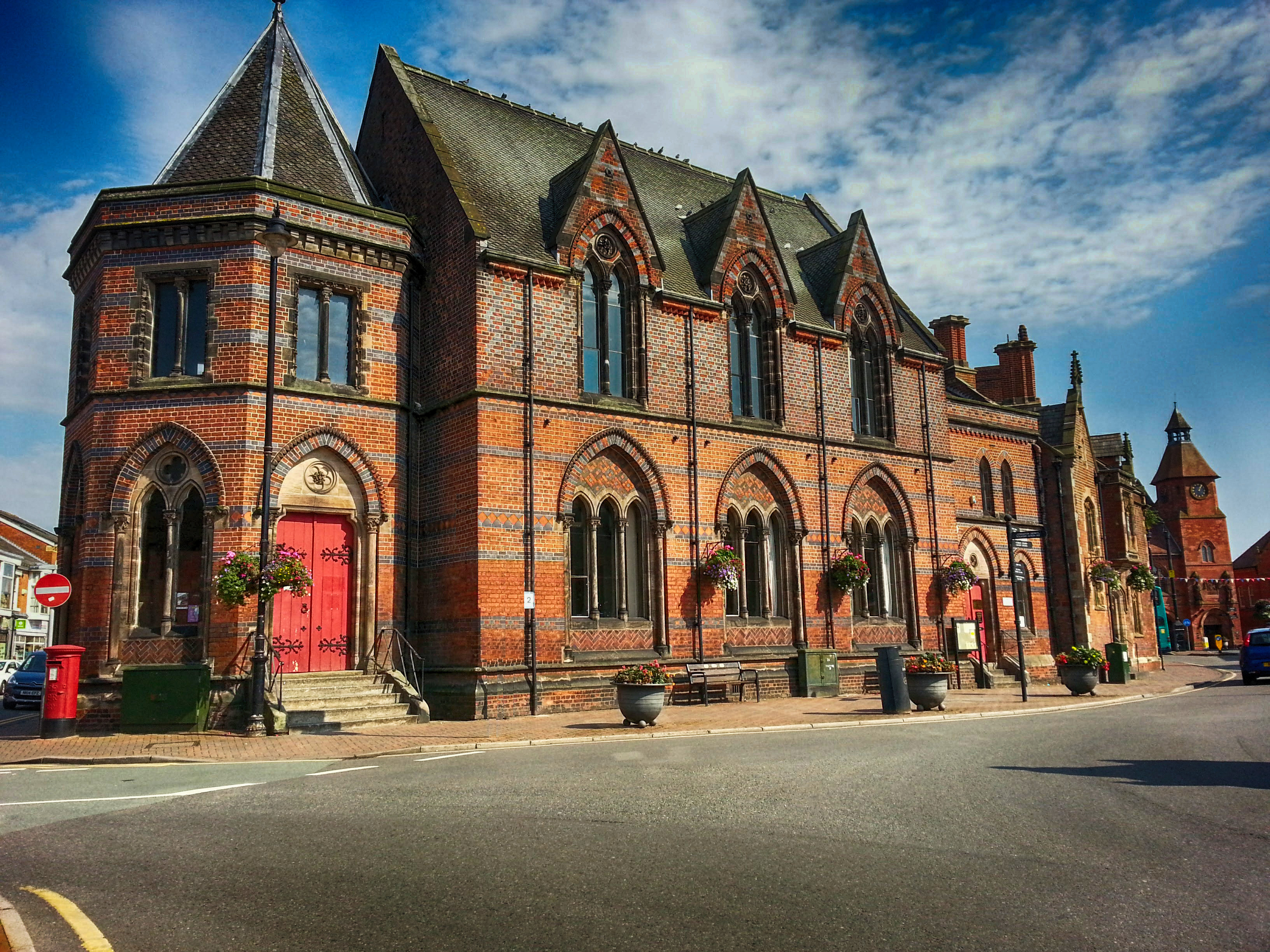
Sandbach Literary Institution (1857)

- Literary Institution, Sandbach (1857)
- Crimea War Memorial, Westminster School, Broad Sanctuary, Westminster (1858)
- School, Ashley, Northamptonshire (1858)
- The Vaughan Library, Harrow School, Middlesex (1861–63)
- Foreign and Commonwealth Office, Whitehall, London (1861–1868)
- Fitzroy Memorial Library, Lewes, East Sussex (1862)
- Preston Town Hall, Lancashire (1862–67), destroyed by fire in 1947

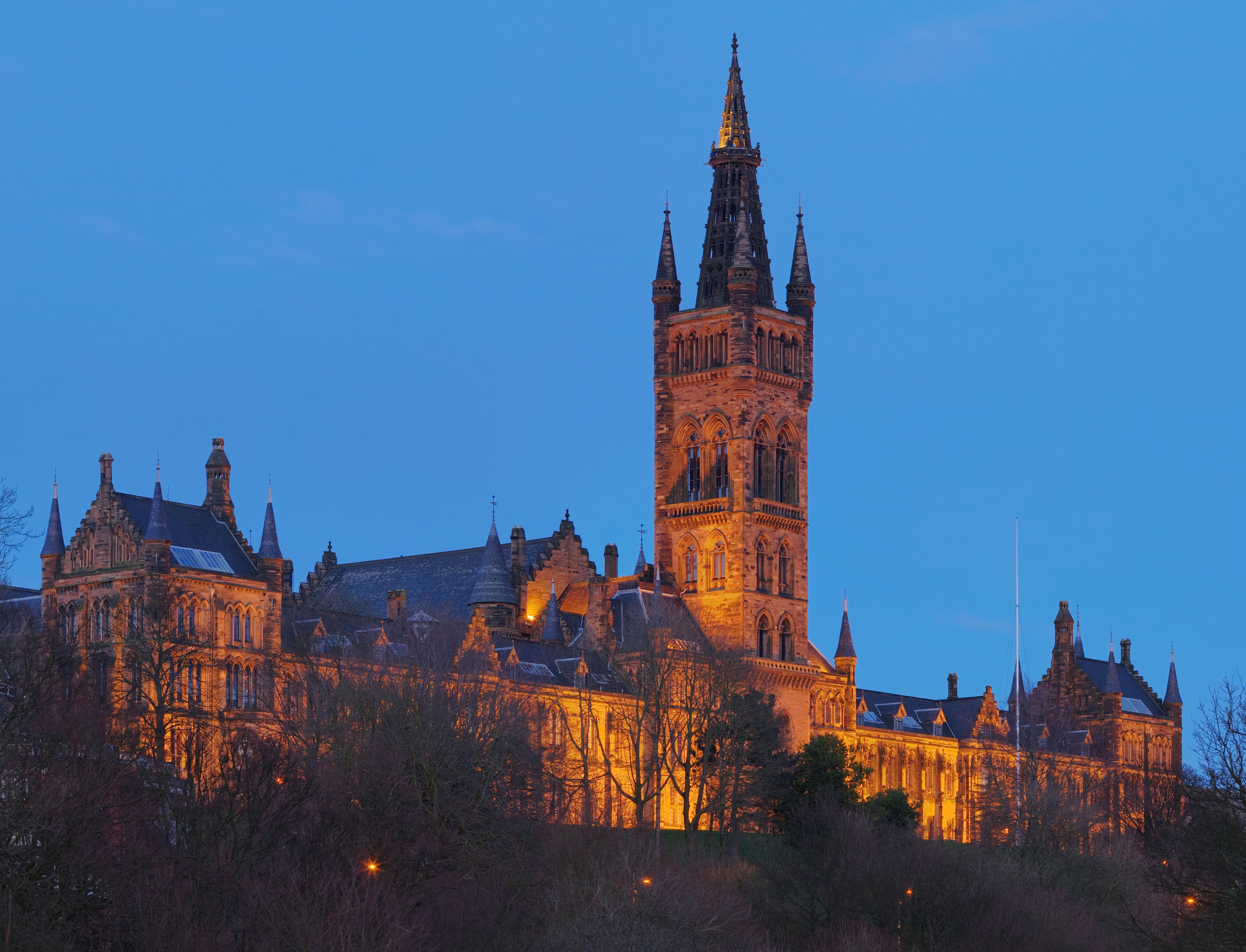
The University of Glasgow's main building (1870)

- Old Schools, Cambridge (1864–67)
- Leeds General Infirmary (1864–67)
- The Albert Memorial, London (1864–72); in the podium frieze, one of the images of architects, sculpted by John Birnie Philip shows Scott himself
- Midland Grand Hotel, St Pancras Station, London (1865)
- McManus Galleries – formerly the Albert Institute, Dundee (1865–69)
- The School, Great Dunmow, Essex (1866)

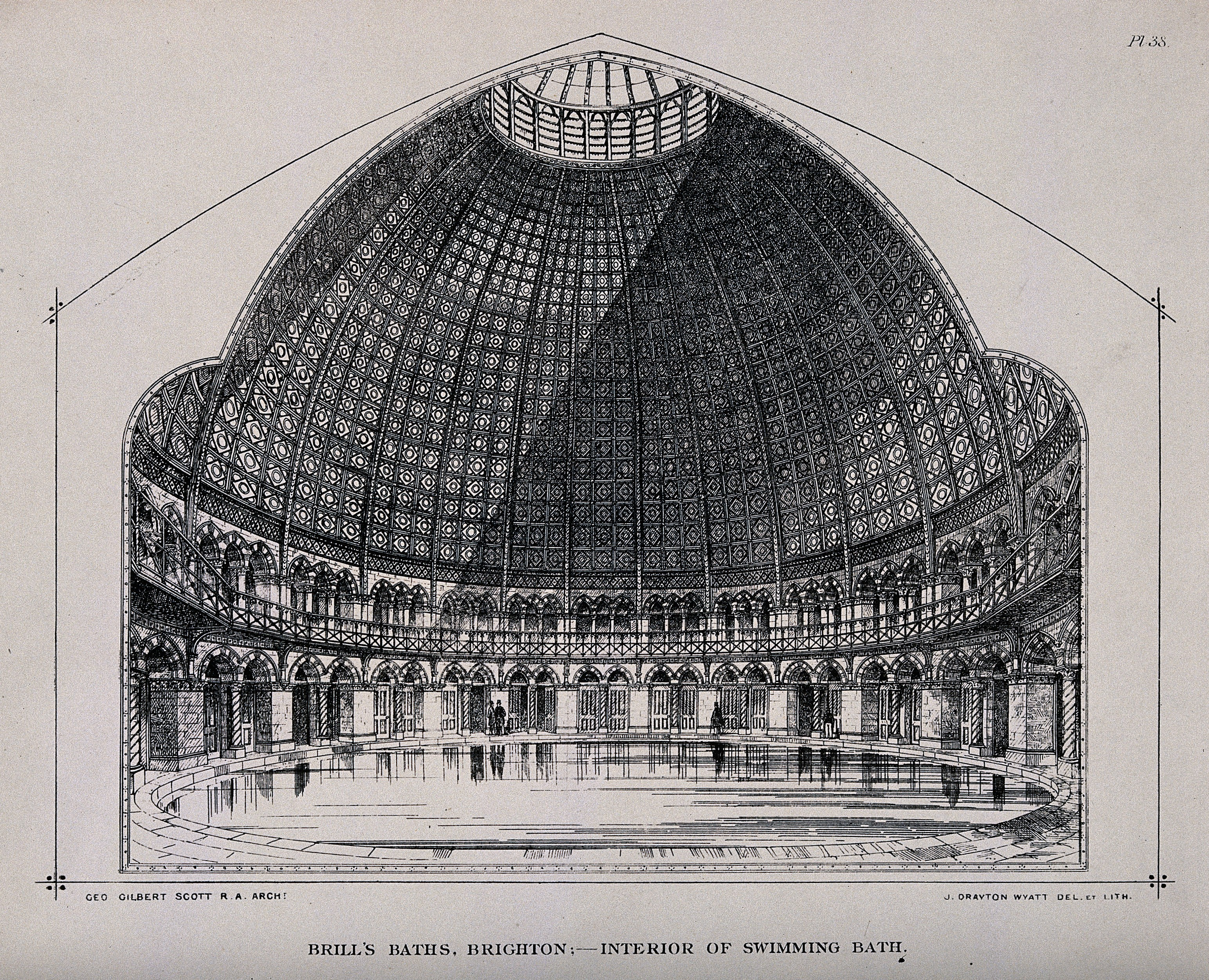
Panoramic view of Brill's swimming bath, Brighton. Lithograph by J. Drayton Wyatt

- Brill Swimming Baths, Brighton (1866–69), demolished 1929
- Clifton Hampden Bridge, Oxfordshire (1867)
- The library of the Grammar School (now Hall Cross School) in Doncaster (1868)
- Market Cross, Helmsley, Yorkshire (1869)
- School Nocton, Lincolnshire (1869)
- Extension to Radcliffe Infirmary, Oxford (1869–71)
- Lincoln's Inn, London, Library extension (1870–72), New Chambers Block A (1873) and New Chambers Block B (1876–78)
- The main building of the new campus of the University of Glasgow (1870), often called the Gilbert Scott Building
- Savernake Hospital, Wiltshire (1871–72)
- Gatehouse to Ramsgate Cemetery, Kent (1872)
- The University Senate Hall, Mumbai University (1869–74)
- The University Library and Rajabai Clock Tower, Mumbai University (1869–78)
- The Clarkson Memorial in Wisbech. Scott first put forward designs in 1875, but work did not start until 1880. The eventual design was a slightly altered version of Scott's original design.

=== Domestic buildings ===
- Vicarage, Wappenham, Northamptonshire (1833)
- 16 High Street, Chesham, Buckinghamshire (1835)
- Vicarage, Dinton, Buckinghamshire (1836)
- Rectory, Weston Turville, Buckinghamshire (1838)
- Parsonage, Blakesley, Northamptonshire (1839)
- Parsonage, Hartshill, Stoke on Trent (1840)
- Wanstead Infant Orphanage Asylum, London Borough of Redbridge (1841)
- Seamen's Hospital, Whitby, Yorkshire (1842)
- Workers Houses, Hartshill, Stoke on Trent (1842–48)
- Parsonage, Clifton Hampden, Oxfordshire (1843–46)
- Trotter's almshouses, Ridge, Hertfordshire (1844) (with W.B. Moffatt)
- Parsonage, Barnet, Hertford (1845)
- Parsonage, St Mark's, Swindon (c. 1846)
- Parsonage, Wembley, Middlesex (1846)
- Parsonage, Weeton, North Yorkshire (c. 1852)
- Houses Broad Sanctuary, Westminster (1852–54)
- Parsonage, St Paul's, Cambridge (1853–54), now Cambridge Muslim College
- Parsonage, St Mary's, Stoke Newington, London (c. 1855)
- All Souls' Vicarage, Halifax, Yorkshire (c. 1856)
- Cottages, Ilam, Staffordshire (c. 1857)
- Almshouses, Hartshill, Stoke on Trent (1857)
- Lanhydrock House, near Bodmin, Cornwall (1857) an Elizabethan mansion rebuilt after a fire, formal gardens assisted by Richard Coad
- Parsonage, Kilkhampton, Cornwall (c. 1858)
- The Vicarage, Leafield, Oxfordshire (1858)
- Walton Hall, Warwickshire (1858)
- Treverbyn Vean, St Neot, Cornwall (1858–62)
- Parsonage, Ashley, Northamptonshire (1858)
- Claydon House, Buckinghamshire (1859)
- Parsonage, Bridge, Kent (c. 1859)
- Vicarage, Ranmore Common, Surrey (c. 1859)
- Kelham Hall, Nottinghamshire (1859–62)
- Workers' housing at Akroydon, Halifax (1859)
- Almshouses, Sandbach (1860)
- Parsonage, Trefnant, Denbighshire (1860)
- Lee Priory, Littlebourne, Kent, alterations and additions (1860–63) demolished
- Rectory, Higham, Forest Heath, Suffolk (c. 1861)
- Kingston Grange, Kingston St Mary, Somerset for Mr Perkins (c. 1861)
- Parsonage, St Andrew's, Leicester (c. 1861)
- Hartland Abbey (c.1851) supervised by Richard Coad, built by Pulsman of Barnstaple
- Hafodunos, Llangernyw, North Wales (1861–1866)
- Vicarage, Jarrom Street, Leicester (1862)
- Nos 1,3 & 3a Dean's Yard, Westminster (1862)
- Parsonage, Leith, Midlothian (1862)
- Brownsover Hall, Warwickshire, date uncertain (c. 1860)
- Two lodge houses at Great Barr Hall, near Birmingham (pre-1863)
- The Master's House, St John's College, Cambridge (1863)
- Parsonage, Christ Church, Ottershaw, Surrey (c. 1864)
- Stony House, former Vicarage of St Mary the Virgin Church, London Road, Stony Stratford (1865)
- Parsonage, St Luke's, Weaste, Lancashire (c. 1865)
- Schools Master's House, Ashley, Northamptonshire (1865)
- Almshouses, Winchcombe, Gloucestershire (1865)
- Rectory, Tydd St Giles, Cambridgeshire (1868)
- Vicarage, Higham Green, Suffolk
- Parsonage, Mirfield, Yorkshire (1869)
- Polwhele House, Truro, Cornwall, additions (c. 1870)
- Vicarage, Hillesden, Buckinghamshire (1871)
- St Mary's Homes, Godstone (1872)
- Scott's Building, King's College, Cambridge (1873)
- Parsonage, St Michael's, New Southgate, Middlesex (c. 1874)
- Parsonage, St Saviour's, Leicester (1875)
- Parsonage, Fulney, Lincolnshire (1877–80)
- New Court, Pembroke College, Cambridge (1881)
- Garboldisham Hall, Garboldisham, Norfolk (1822)

=== Church buildings ===
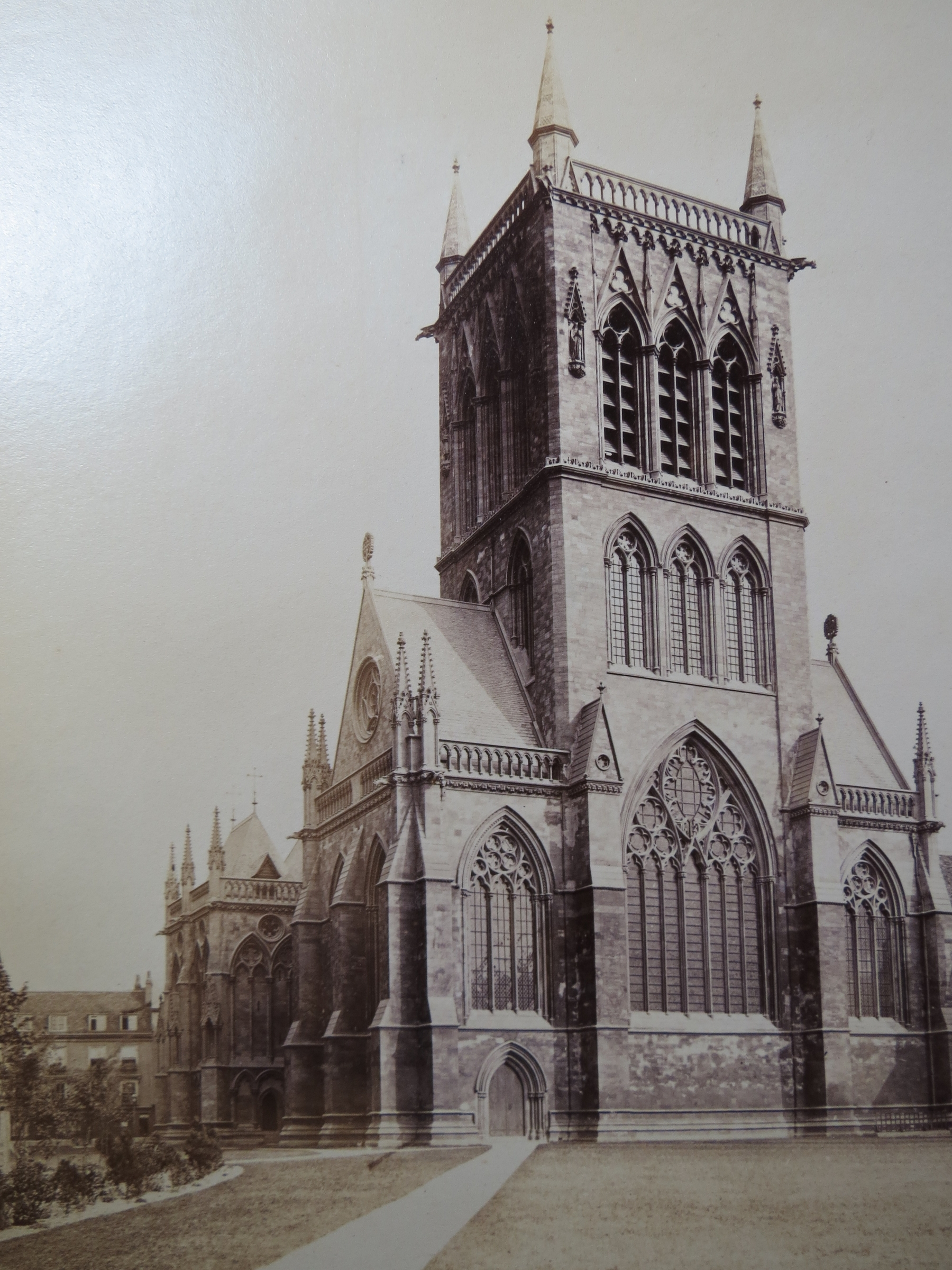
St John's College Chapel, Cambridge (1866–1869)

- St Mark's Church, Ladywood (1840–41) (demolished 1947)
- St Giles' Church, Camberwell, London (1841–44)
- Christ Church, Bridlington (1840–41)
- St Mary's Church, Hanwell, Middlesex (1841)
- Holy Trinity, Hulme (1841)
- St Peter's Church, Norbiton, Surrey (1841)
- Holy Trinity Church, Hartshill, Stoke on Trent (1842)
- St John the Baptist's Church, St John's, Woking, Surrey (1842)
- St John the Baptist Church, Beeston, Nottinghamshire (1842)
- St Michael and All Angels Church, Wood Green (1843)
- St John the Baptist's Church, Leenside, Nottingham (1843–44)
- Holy Trinity Church, Halstead, Essex (1843–44)
- St John the Evangelist, West Meon, Hampshire (1843–46)
- St Mark's Church, Worsley, Greater Manchester (1844–46)
- St John the Evangelist, Wembley, Middlesex (1846)
- St Matthias, Malvern Link, Worcestershire (1844–46)
- St Mark's Church, Swindon (1845)
- St Matthew’s Church, Donnington Wood, Telford, Shropshire (1845)
- St Nikolai, Hamburg (1845–80), the tallest building in the world from 1874 to 1876
- Memorial Chapel, Bromsgrove School
- The Cathedral of St John the Baptist in St John's, Newfoundland (1847, construction overseen by apprentice William Hay)
- St Mary the Virgin, Aylesbury (1848)
- St Gregory's Church, Canterbury (1848)
- St Paul's Church, Canterbury (1848)
- St Cwyfan, Tudweiliog, Gwynedd (1849)
- Christ Church, Swindon, Wiltshire (1851)
- St Peter's Church, South Croydon (1851)
- Emmanuel Church, Forest Gate, London (1852)
- St John's Church, Eastnor, Herefordshire (1852) and Monument (1855)
- All Saints' Church, Watford, Hertfordshire (1853)
- St Paul's Episcopal Cathedral, Dundee (1853) (cathedral since 1905)
- St Mary's Church, West Derby, Liverpool (1853–6)
- All Saints' Church, Sherbourne, Warwick (1854)
- Christ Church, Lee Park, Kent (1854) (bombed 1941, demolished 1944)
- St John the Evangelist, Shirley, Surrey (1854)
- Holy Trinity Church, Coventry (1854)
- St Paul's Church, Chippenham (1854–55)
- Chapel of Exeter College, Oxford (1854–60)
- Holy Trinity Church, Trefnant (1855)
- St John's Church, Bilton, Harrogate (1855)
- St Mary, Hayes, Kent (alterations) (1856–62)
- St Peter, Bushley, Worcestershire: roof (1856)
- St Mary, Tedstone Delamere, Herefordshire: chancel (1856–57)
- St George's Minster, Doncaster (1858)
- St Mary New Church, Stoke Newington (1858)
- St Matthias Church, Richmond, London (1858)
- All Souls Church, Halifax (1859)
- St Thomas's Church, Huddersfield (1859)
- St Michael and All Angels Church, Leafield, Oxfordshire (1859–60)
- St Matthew's Church, Stretton, Cheshire (1859 and 1867)
- St Matthew's Church, Yiewsley, Hillingdon (1859)
- St Mary, Edvin Loach, Herefordshire (?1860)
- Christ Church, Wanstead, Essex (1861)
- St Stephen's Church, Higham Green, Suffolk (1861)
- St John the Evangelist, Sandbach Heath (1861)
- All Saints' Church, Hawkhurst, Kent (1861)
- St Andrews, Jarrom Street, Leicester (1862)
- The Hereford Screen (1862), choir screen from Hereford Cathedral, now restored and in the Victoria and Albert Museum, London
- Chapel of Wellington College, Berkshire (1861–63)
- All Saints' Church, Langton Green, Kent (1862–63)
- St Barnabas' Church, Bromborough, Merseyside (1862–64)
- St Andrew's Hospital Chapel, Northampton (1863)
- St John the Evangelist, Taunton (1863)
- St Clement's Church, Barnsbury (1864–65) (closed 1976 and converted into flats)
- St Andrew's Church, Derby (1864–67)
- St Andrew's Church, Uxbridge (1865)
- St John the Baptist, Penshurst (1865)
- St Luke's Church, Pendleton (1865)
- St Stephen & St Mark, Lewisham (1865)
- St Mary's Church, Shackleford, Surrey (1865)
- St Edmund's Church, Salisbury: restoration including rebuilding of chancel (1865–67) (now an arts centre)
- St Matthew's Church, Leicester (1865–67)
- St Denys Church, Southampton (1868)
- St Stephen's Church, Higham Green, Suffolk (1868)
- St James' Church, Cradley, Herefordshire Chancel (1868)
- Holy Trinity Church, Shanghai (1866–69)
- St Peter's Church, Edensor, Derbyshire (1867–70)
- St Mary's Church, Mirfield (1869–1871)
- Ramsgate Cemetery Chapel, Kent (1869)
- All Saints' church, Ryde, Isle of Wight (1872)
- St Thomas of Canterbury Church, Chester (1872)
- St Peter and St Paul, Priory Church Leominster, Herefordshire Quatrefoil piers (1872–79)
- The Cathedral Church of St Mary the Virgin, Glasgow (1873)
- St Thomas, Green Hammerton, N. Yorkshire, 1874–76
- Christ Church, Bradford-on-Avon (additions) (1875)
- St Saviour's Church, Leicester (1875–77)
- All Souls, Blackman Lane, Leeds (1879) – his last work, a large lancet-style church
- St Mary The Virgin, Speldhurst, Kent (1879)
- St Michael and St George Cathedral, Grahamstown (tower and spire completed in 1879)
- St Paul's Church, Low Fulney, Spalding, Lincolnshire (completed 1880)
- St Michael, Stourport-on-Severn, Worcestershire: designed (1875), started (1881) by son John Oldrid Scott, never finished and partly demolished
- ChristChurch Cathedral, Christchurch, New Zealand

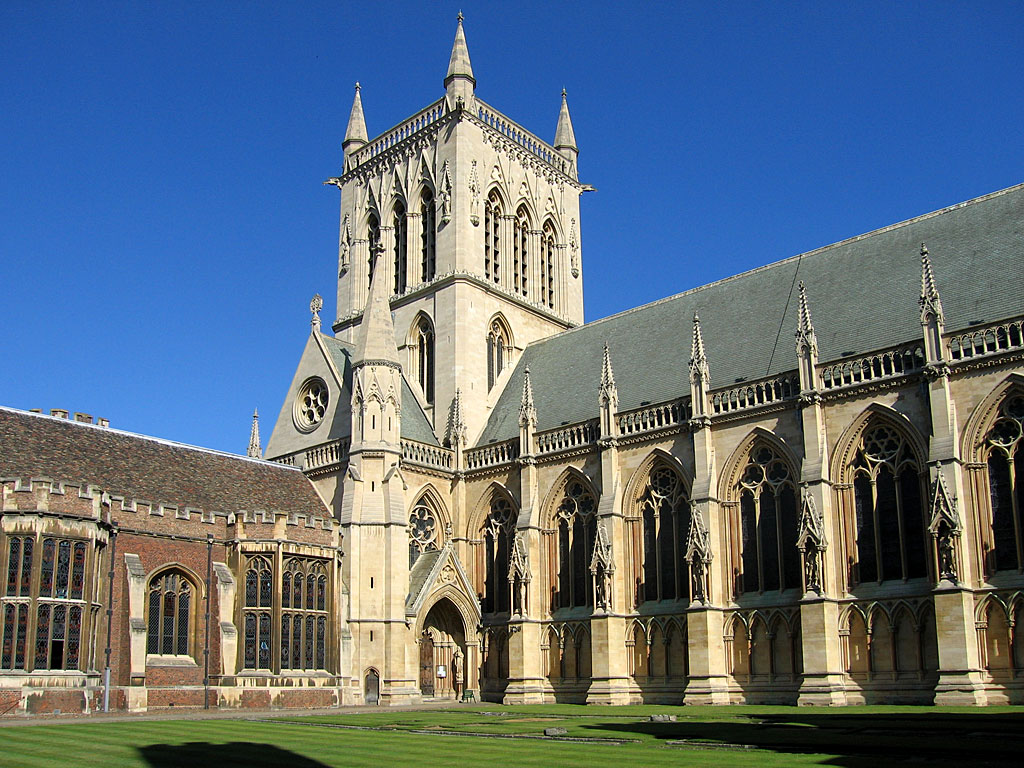
The chapel of St John's College, Cambridge is characteristic of Scott's many church designs

- St John the Baptist Church, Busbridge, Godalming, Surrey
- St Mary's Cathedral, Edinburgh (Episcopal)
- St Mary's Church, Mirfield, West Yorkshire
- St Mary, Timsbury, Somerset
- St Nicholas's, Newport, Lincoln, Lincolnshire
- St Peter's Church, Elworth, Cheshire
- Christ The Saviour, Ealing, London
- Christ Church, Ramsgate, Kent
- St Lawrence's Church, St Lawrence, Isle of Wight (1878)

=== Restorations ===
==== Churches ====
Scott was involved in major restorations of medieval church architecture, all across England.

- Church of St Peter and St Paul, Buckingham, Buckinghamshire
- All Saints' Church, Hillesden, Buckinghamshire (1874–75)
- Church of St Mary the Less, Cambridge, Cambridgeshire (1856–57)
- St John the Baptist Church, Upton Bishop, Herefordshire (1862)
- St Mary's Church, Halton, Cheshire (1852)
- St John the Baptist Church, Halesowen, West Midlands (1875)
- St Peter's Church, Prestbury, Cheshire (1879–1881)
- St Mary's Church, Sandbach, Cheshire (1847)
- St Cuthbert's Church, Darlington, County Durham (1864–65)
- Church of St Mary and All Saints, Chesterfield, Derbyshire (1843)
- Church of St John the Baptist, Danbury, Essex (1866–67)
- St Mary Abbots, Kensington, Greater London (1872)
- St Margaret's Church, Westminster, Greater London (1877–78)
- Church of St John the Baptist, Aconbury, Herefordshire (1863)
- St Leonard's Church, Yarpole, Herefordshire (1864)
- St Mary's Church, Bishopsbourne, Kent (1871)
- St Paul's Church, Canterbury, Kent (1860s)
- St Wulfram's Church, Grantham, Lincolnshire (1866–75)
- All Saints' Church, Winterton, Lincolnshire (1867)
- Church of St Mary and St Nicholas, Spalding, Lincolnshire (1865-7)
- All Saints' Church, East Winch, Norfolk (1878)
- St Margaret's Church, King's Lynn, Norfolk (1875)
- St Peter's Church, Northampton, Northamptonshire (1849-1851)
- St Andrew's Church, Spratton, Northamptonshire (1847)
- Church of St Mary Magdalene, Newark-on-Trent, Nottinghamshire (1850s)
- St Mary's Church, Nottingham, Nottinghamshire (1850s)
- Church of St Mary Magdalene, Duns Tew, Oxfordshire (1861–62)
- All Saints' Church, Oakham, Rutland (1857–1858)
- Church of St John the Baptist, Glastonbury, Somerset (1850s)
- Church of St Mary, Orchardleigh, Somerset (1878)
- Church of St Editha, Tamworth, Staffordshire (1850s)
- St Cybi's Church, Holyhead, Wales (1876 or 1877, completed in 1879 after his death)
- St Mary's Church, Temple Balsall, Warwickshire (1849)
- St Peter's Church, Welford-on-Avon, Warwickshire (1866–67)
- Church of St John the Baptist, Bromsgrove, Worcestershire (1858)
- St Mary's Church, Kingston upon Hull, East Riding of Yorkshire (1861–63)
- All Saints' Church, Barwick-in-Elmet, Leeds, West Yorkshire (1850s)
- Chantry Chapel of St Mary the Virgin, Wakefield, West Yorkshire (1842)

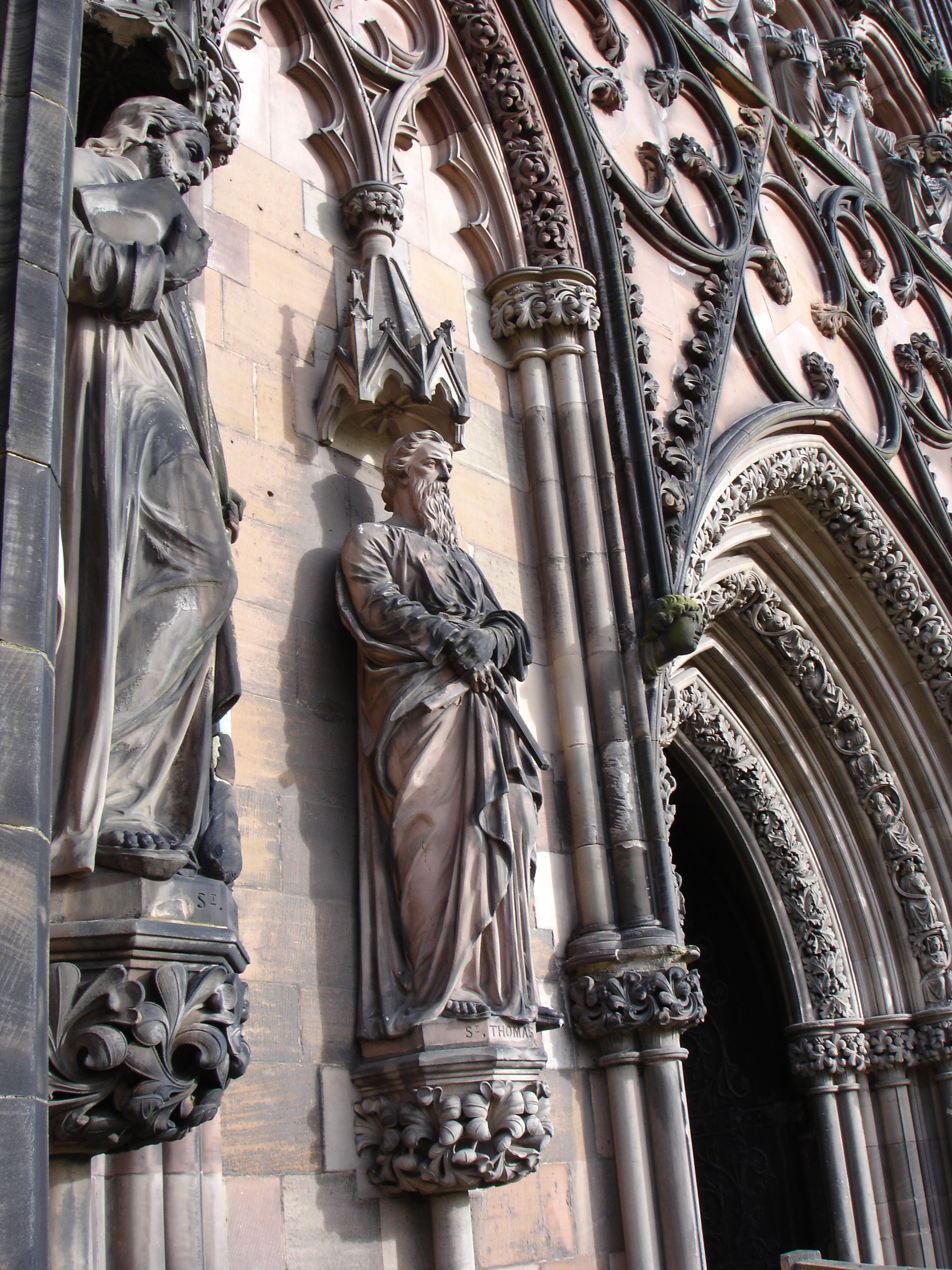
The West Front of Lichfield Cathedral

- Church of the Holy Cross, Sarratt, Hertfordshire (1865-1866)

==== Cathedrals ====
- Ely Cathedral (1847–78)
- Gloucester Cathedral (1854–76)
- Peterborough Cathedral (1855–60)
- Coventry Cathedral (1855–57)
- Hereford Cathedral east side (1855–63)
- Lichfield Cathedral (1855–61 & 1877–81)
- Wakefield Cathedral (1858–60, 1865–69 and 1872–74)
- Durham Cathedral (1859 and 1874–76)
- Brecon Cathedral (1860–62 & 1872–75)
- Canterbury Cathedral (1860 & 1877–80)
- Chichester Cathedral (1861–67 & 1872)
- Ripon Cathedral (1862–72)
- St Michael and St George Cathedral, Grahams town, South Africa (1824)
- St Edmundsbury Cathedral (1863–64 & 1867–69)
- Worcester Cathedral (1863–64, 1868 & 1874)
- St David's Cathedral, St Davids, Wales (1864–76)
- Salisbury Cathedral (1865–71)
- St Asaph Cathedral (1866–69 & 1871)
- Newcastle Cathedral (1867–71 & 1872–76)
- Chester Cathedral (1868–75)
- Exeter Cathedral (1869–70)
- Christ Church, Oxford east wall of choir (1870–72 & 1874–76)
- Rochester Cathedral (1871–74)
- St Albans Cathedral (1871–80)
- Manchester Cathedral (c. 1872)
- Winchester Cathedral (1875)

Additionally, Scott designed the Mason and Dixon monument in York Minster (1860), prepared plans for the restoration of Bristol Cathedral in 1859 and Norwich Cathedral in 1860 neither of which resulted in a commission, and designed a pulpit for Lincoln Cathedral in 1863.

==== Abbeys, priories and collegiate churches ====
- St Mary's Church, Stafford, 1842–45
- Beverley Minster 1844, 1866–68, 1877
- Westminster Abbey, 1848–78
- Dorchester Abbey, 1858, 1862, 1874
- King's College, Cambridge, 1859–63, 1875
- Bath Abbey, 1860–77
- Pershore Abbey, 1861–64, 1867
- St George's Chapel, Windsor Castle, 1863
- Chapel of St James the Great, Lord Leycester Hospital, Warwick, 1863
- Great Malvern Priory, c. 1864
- Boxgrove Priory, 1864–67
- Priory Church, Leominster, 1864–66, 1876–78
- Monkwearmouth-Jarrow Abbey, 1865–66
- Selby Abbey, 1872–74
- Tewkesbury Abbey, 1874–79
- Bridlington Priory, 1875–80

==== Other restoration work ====
Scott restored the Inner Gateway (also known as the Abbey Gateway) of Reading Abbey in 1860–61 after its partial collapse. St Mary's of Charity in Faversham, which was restored (and transformed, with an unusual spire and unexpected interior) by Scott in 1874, and Dundee Parish Church, and designed the chapels of Exeter College, Oxford, St John's College, Cambridge and King's College, London. He also designed St Paul's Cathedral, Dundee.

Lichfield Cathedral's ornate West Front was extensively renovated by Scott from 1855 to 1878. He restored the cathedral to the form he believed it took in the Middle Ages, working with original materials where possible and creating imitations when the originals were not available. It is recognised as some of his finest work.

In 1854 Gilbert Scott began a restoration of Sudeley Castle "working on the western side of the inner court in the style of the existing Medieval and Elizabethan buildings" and subsequently began the restoration of St Mary's chapel, with the assistance of John Drayton Wyatt.

== Gallery of architectural work ==
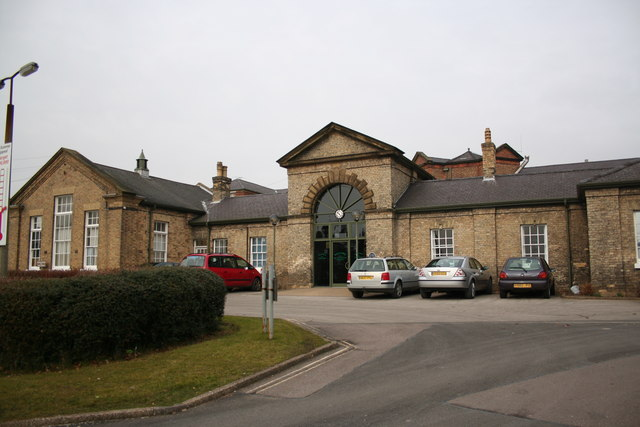
Workhouse, Louth Lincolnshire (1839)

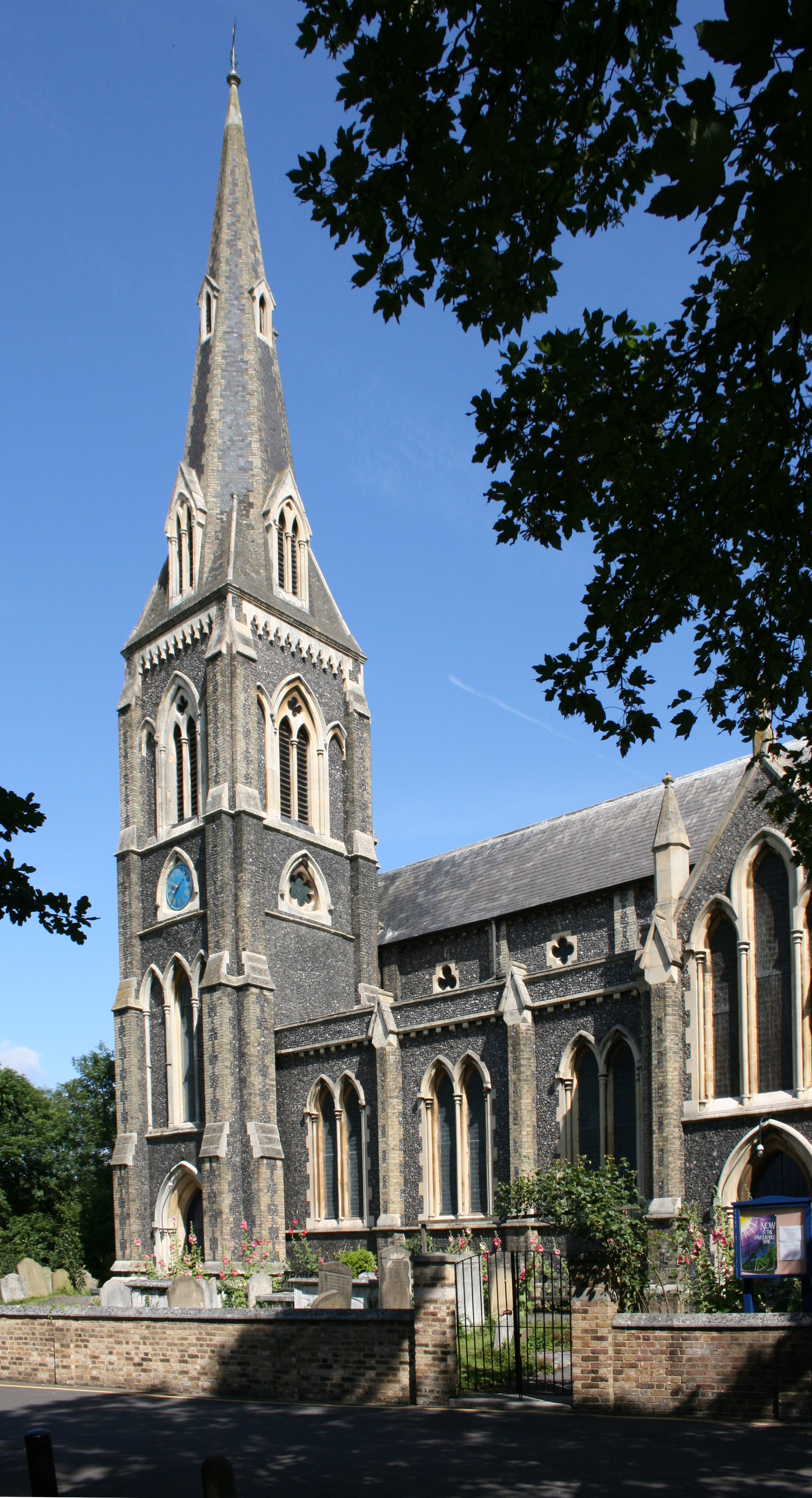
St Mary's Hanwell, Middlesex (1841)

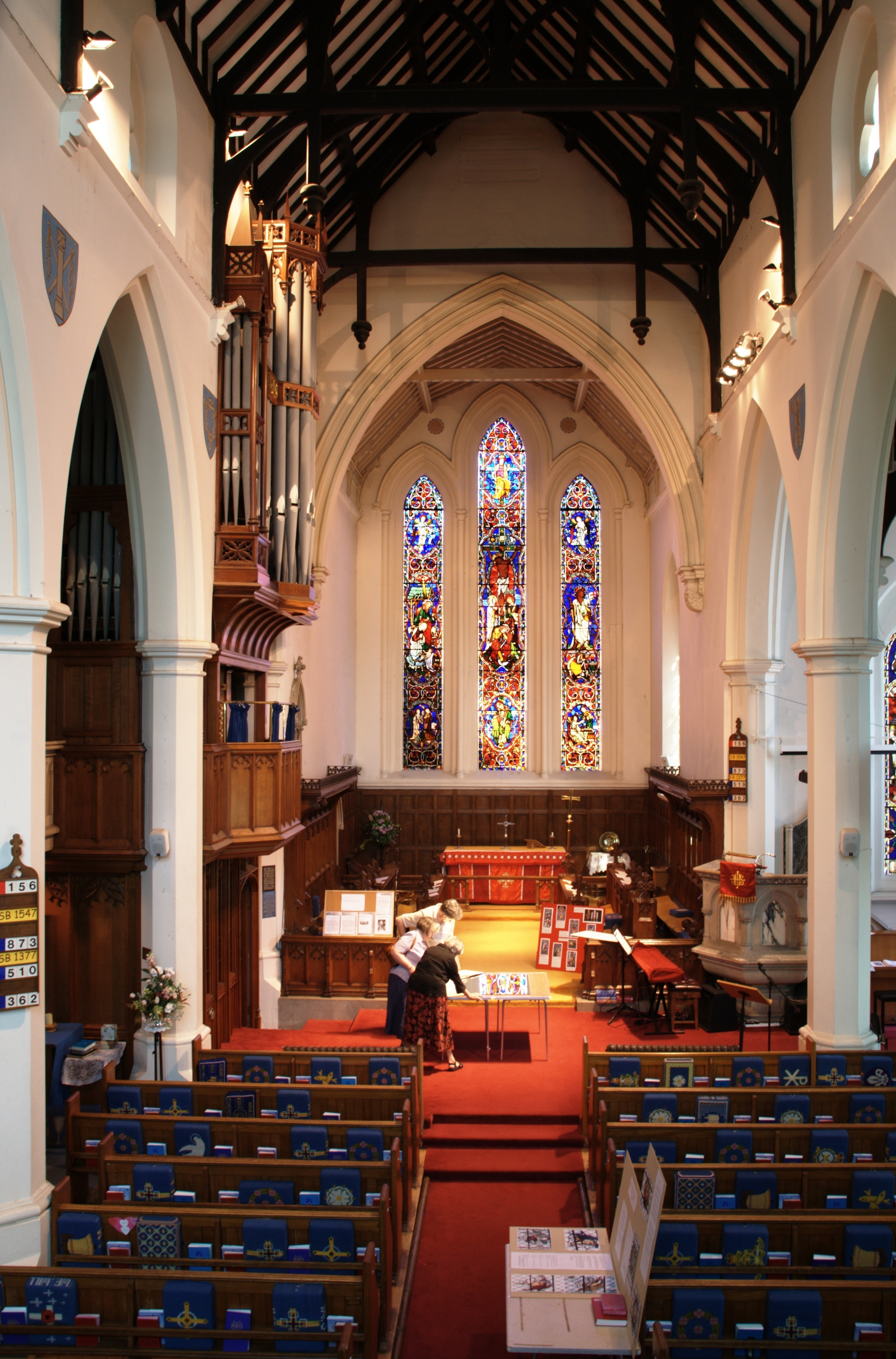
East end, St Mary's Hanwell, Middlesex (1841)

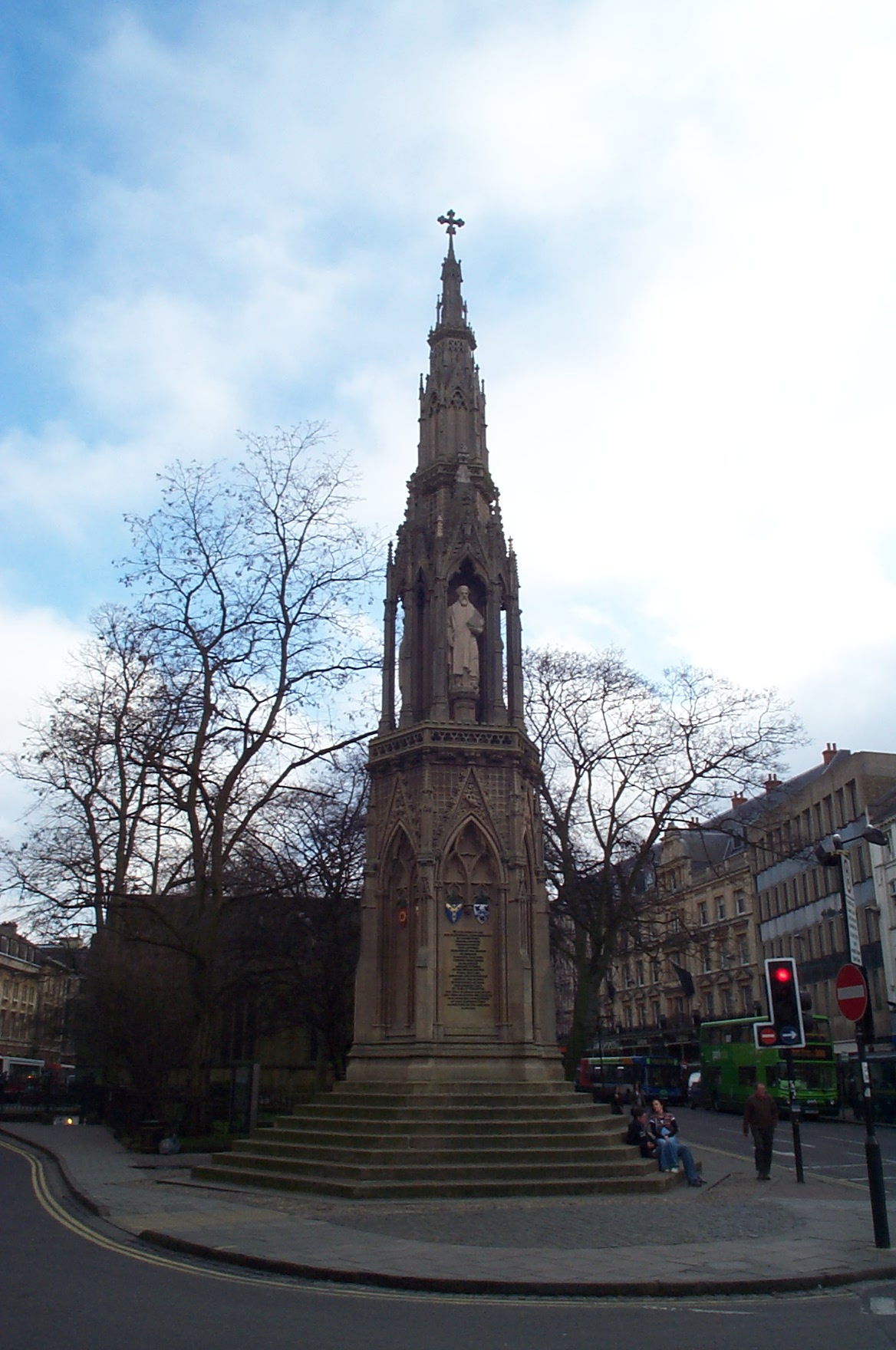
Martyrs' Memorial, Oxford (1841–43)

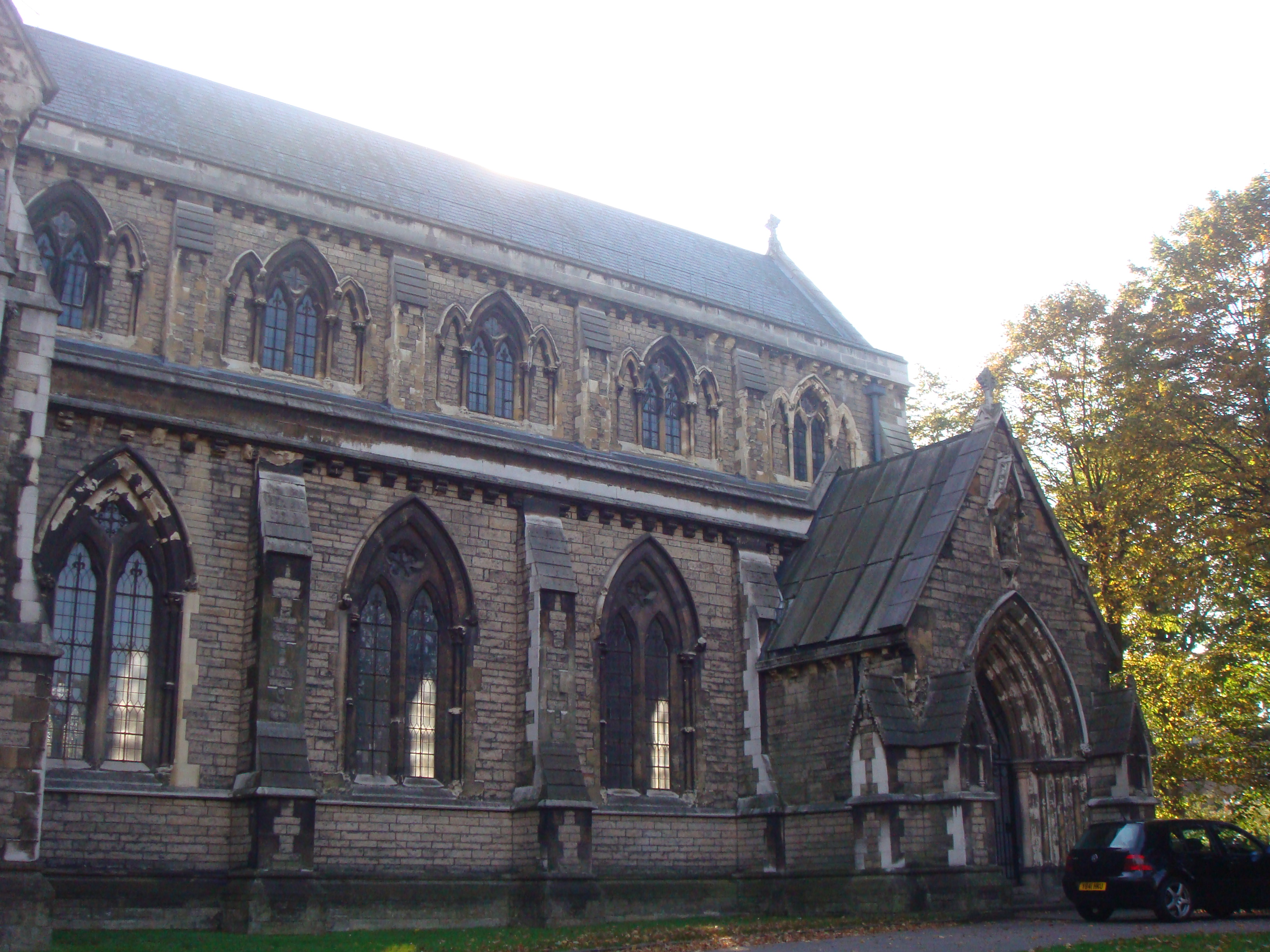
St Giles Church, Camberwell (1842–44)

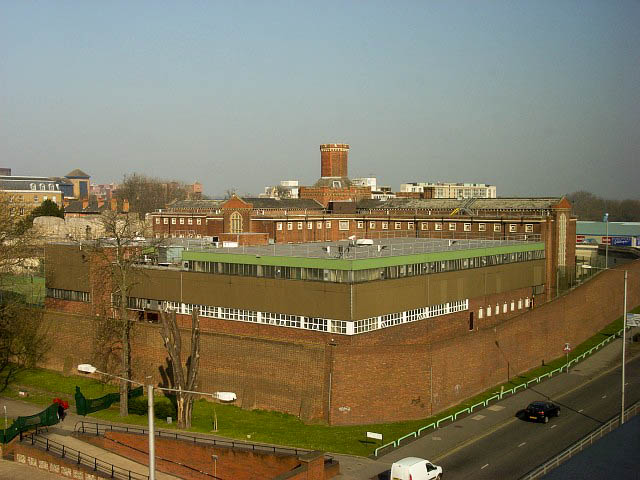
Reading Gaol, Berkshire (1842–44)

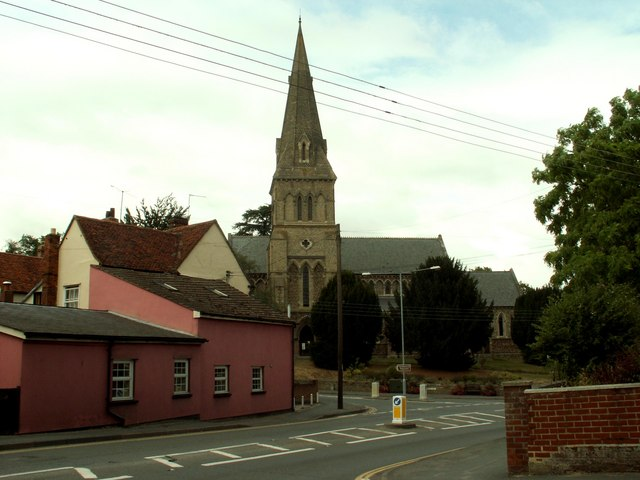
Holy Trinity Church, Halstead, Essex (1843–44)

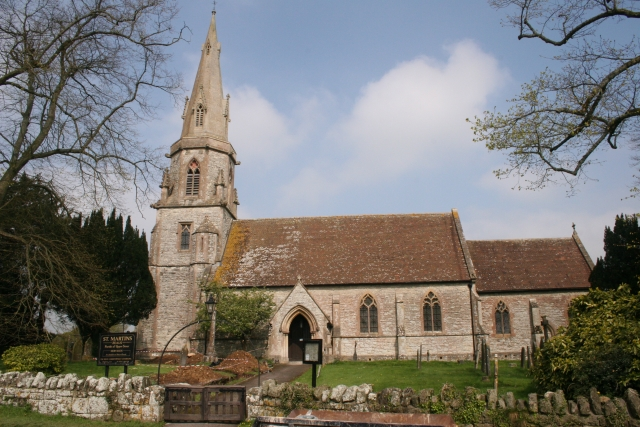
St Martin's, Zeals, Wiltshire (1845–46)

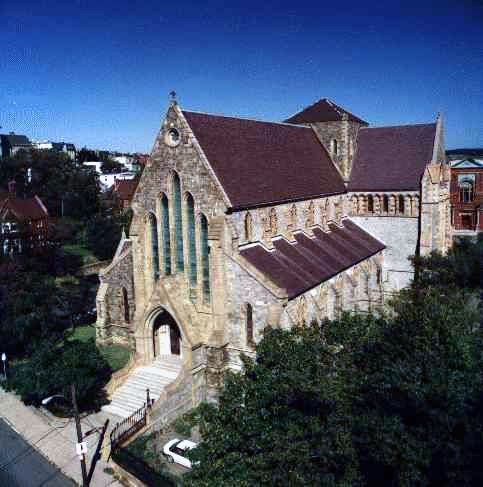
Cathedral of St John, Newfoundland, Canada (1847–1905)

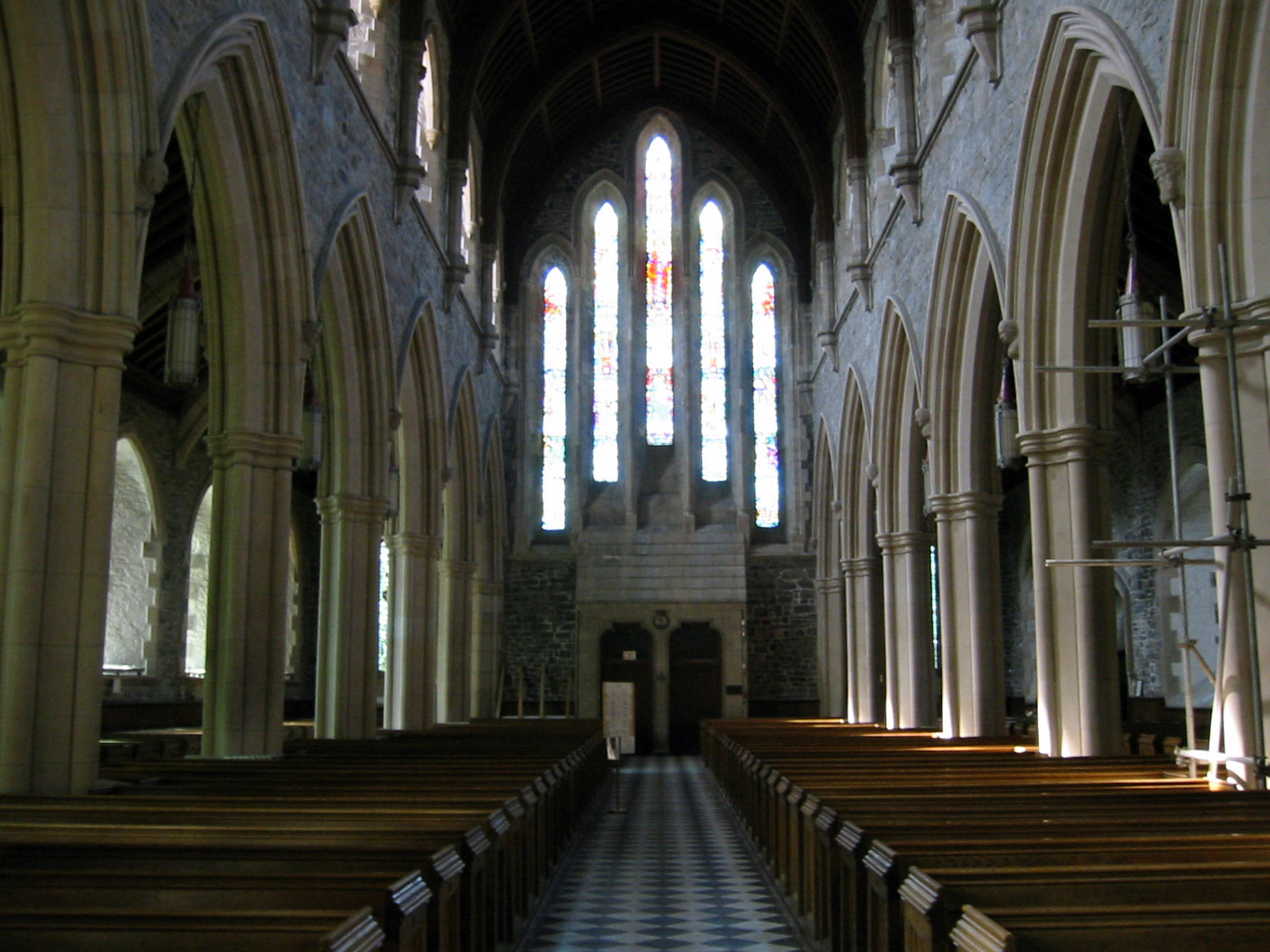
Cathedral of St John, Newfoundland, Canada (1847–1905)

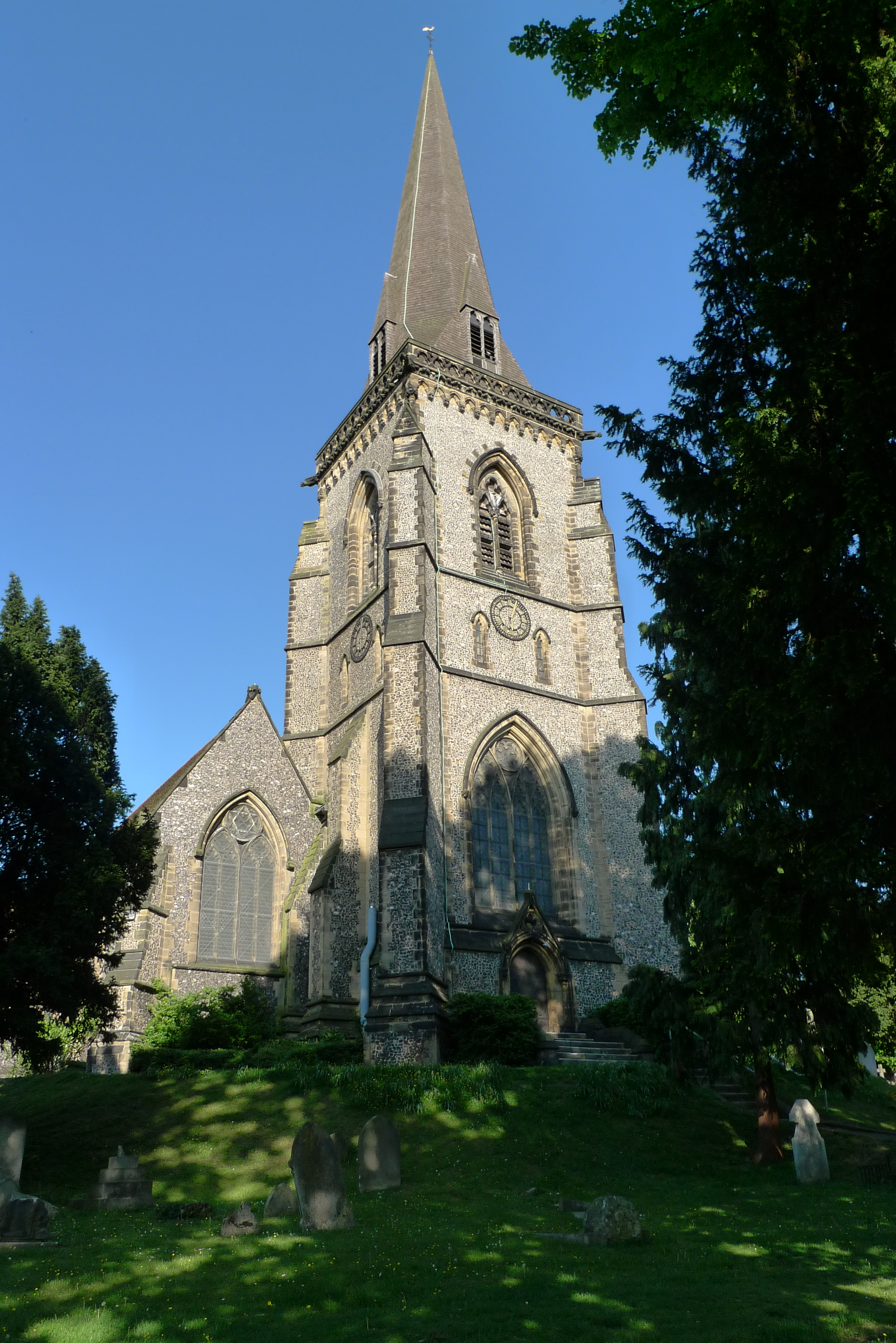
St Peter's Church, Croydon (1849–51)

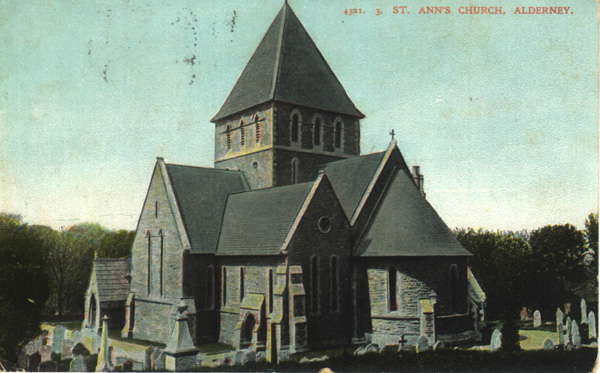
St Anne's Alderney (c. 1850)

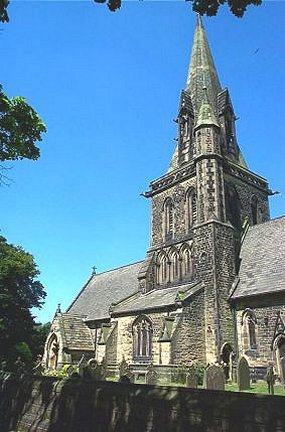
St Barnabas's Church, Weeton, North Yorkshire (1852)

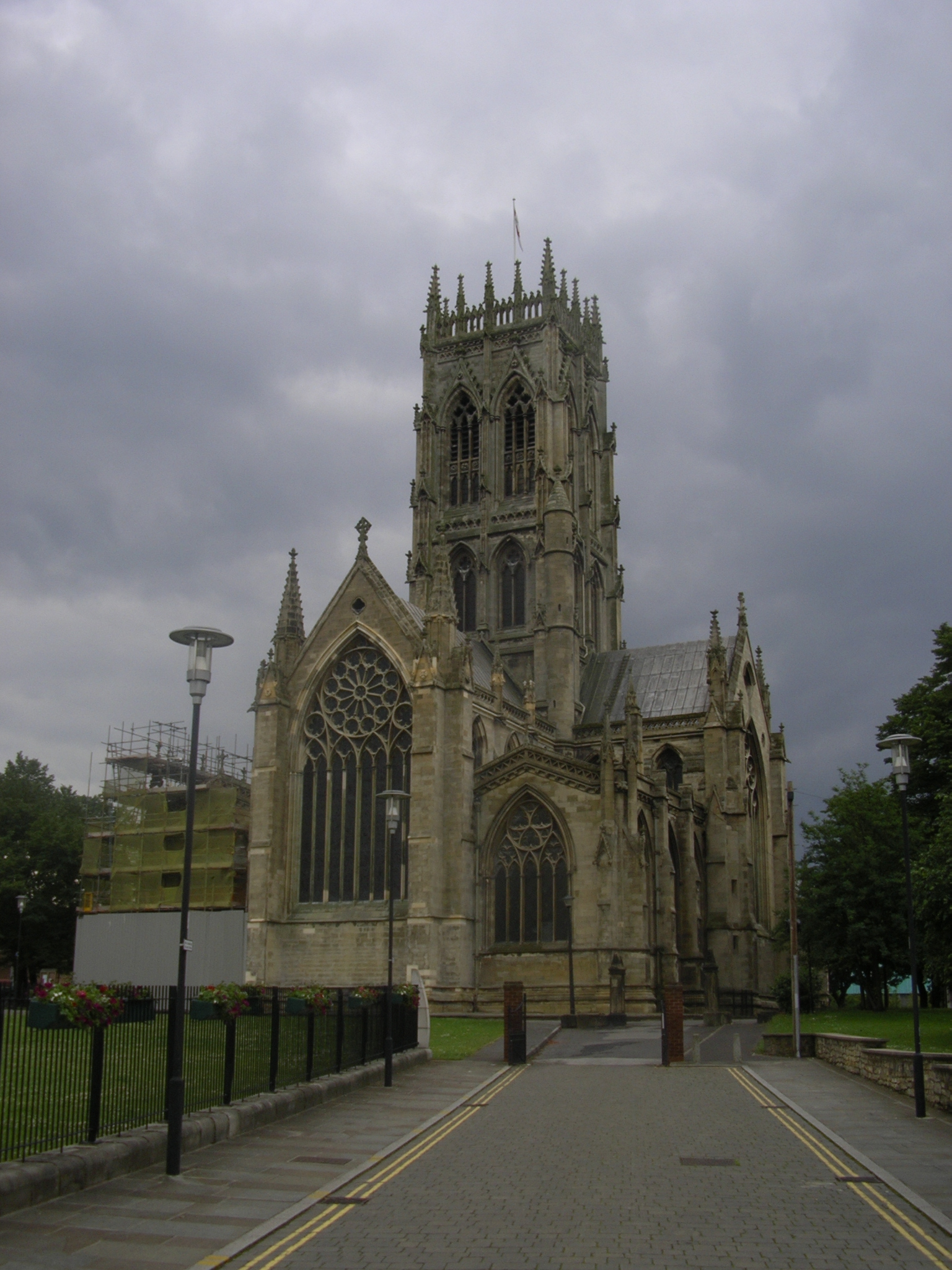
St George's Church, Doncaster, Yorkshire (1853–58)

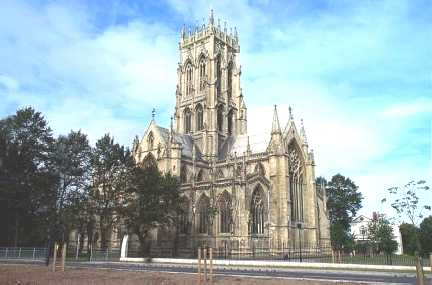
St George's Church, Doncaster, Yorkshire (1853–58)

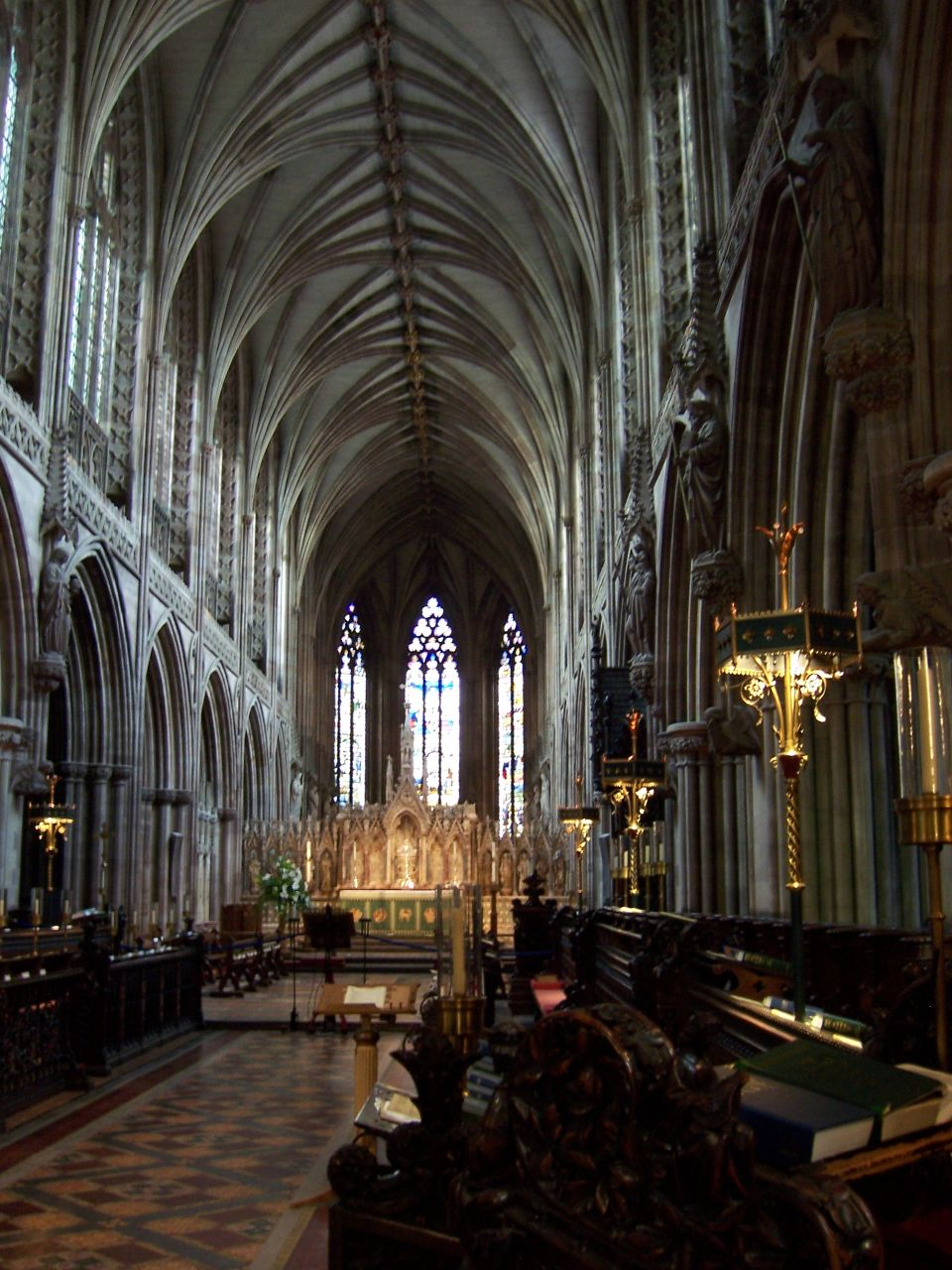
Lichfield Cathedral, as restored and with fittings by Scott (1855–61) & (1877–81)

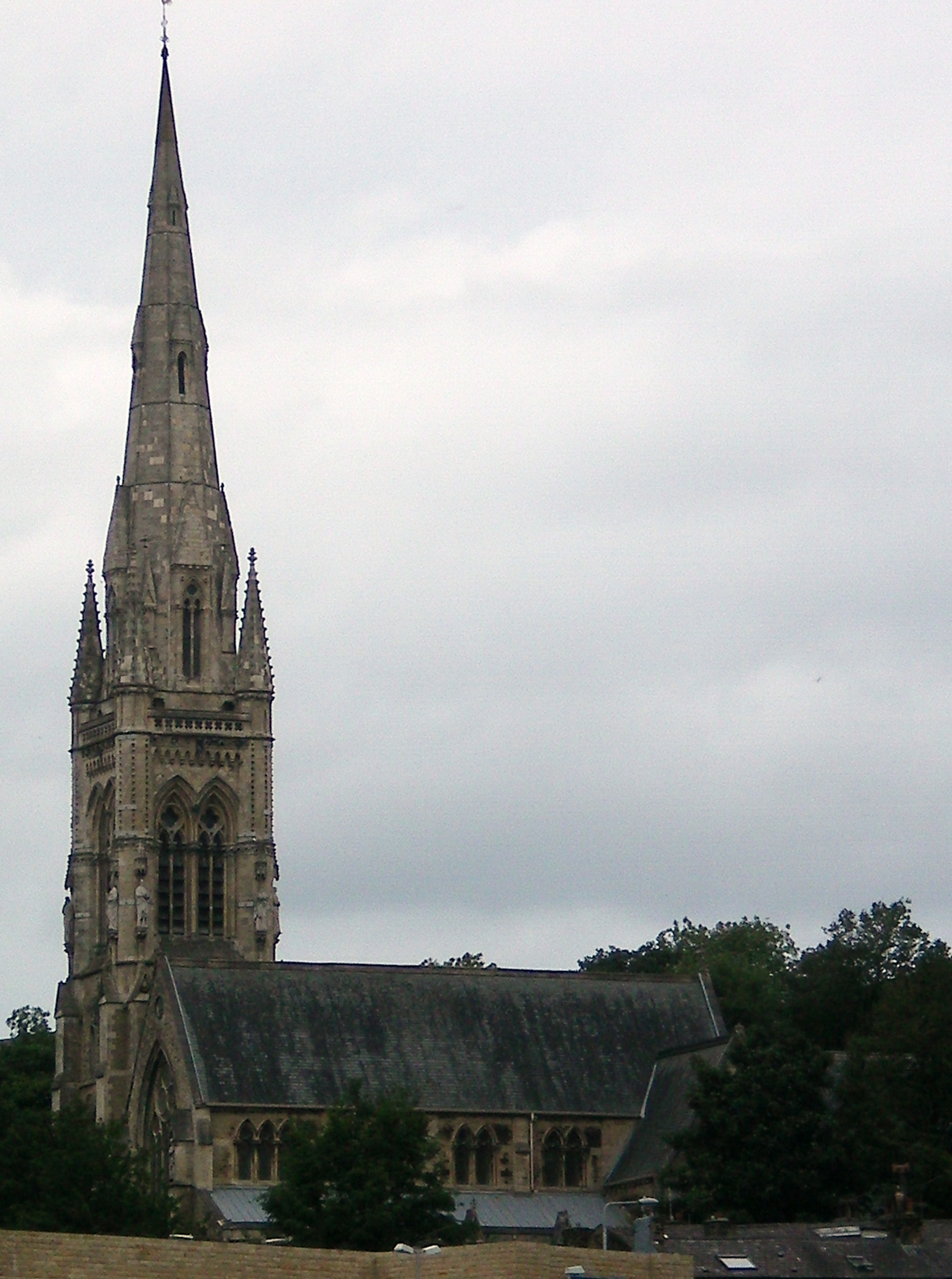
All Souls', Haley Hill, Halifax (1856–59)

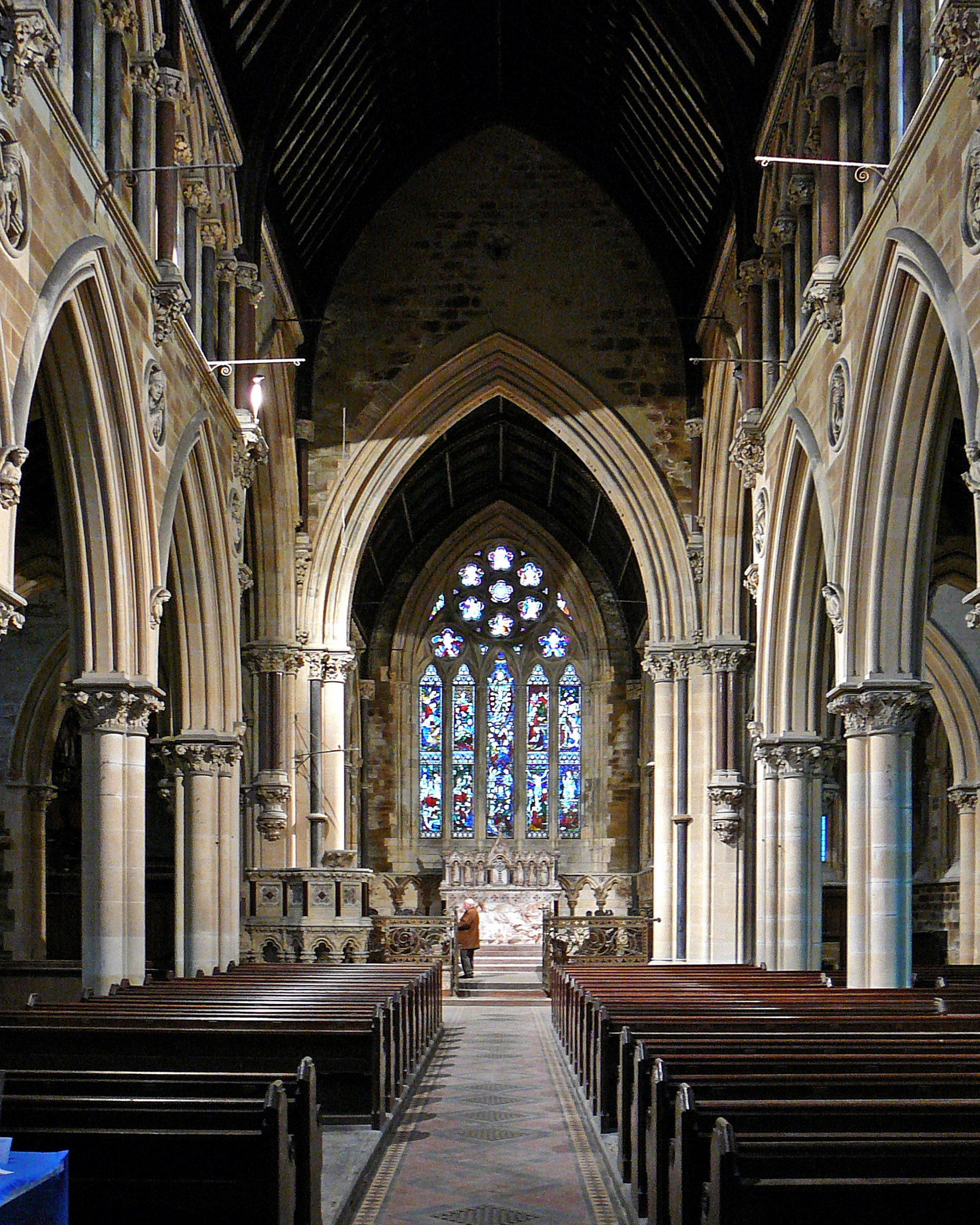
Interior looking east, All Souls', Haley Hill, Halifax, Yorkshire (1856–59)

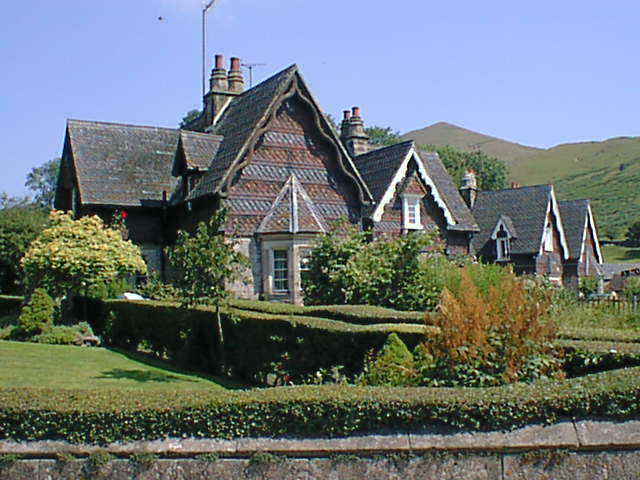
Cottages, Ilam, Staffordshire (c.1871)

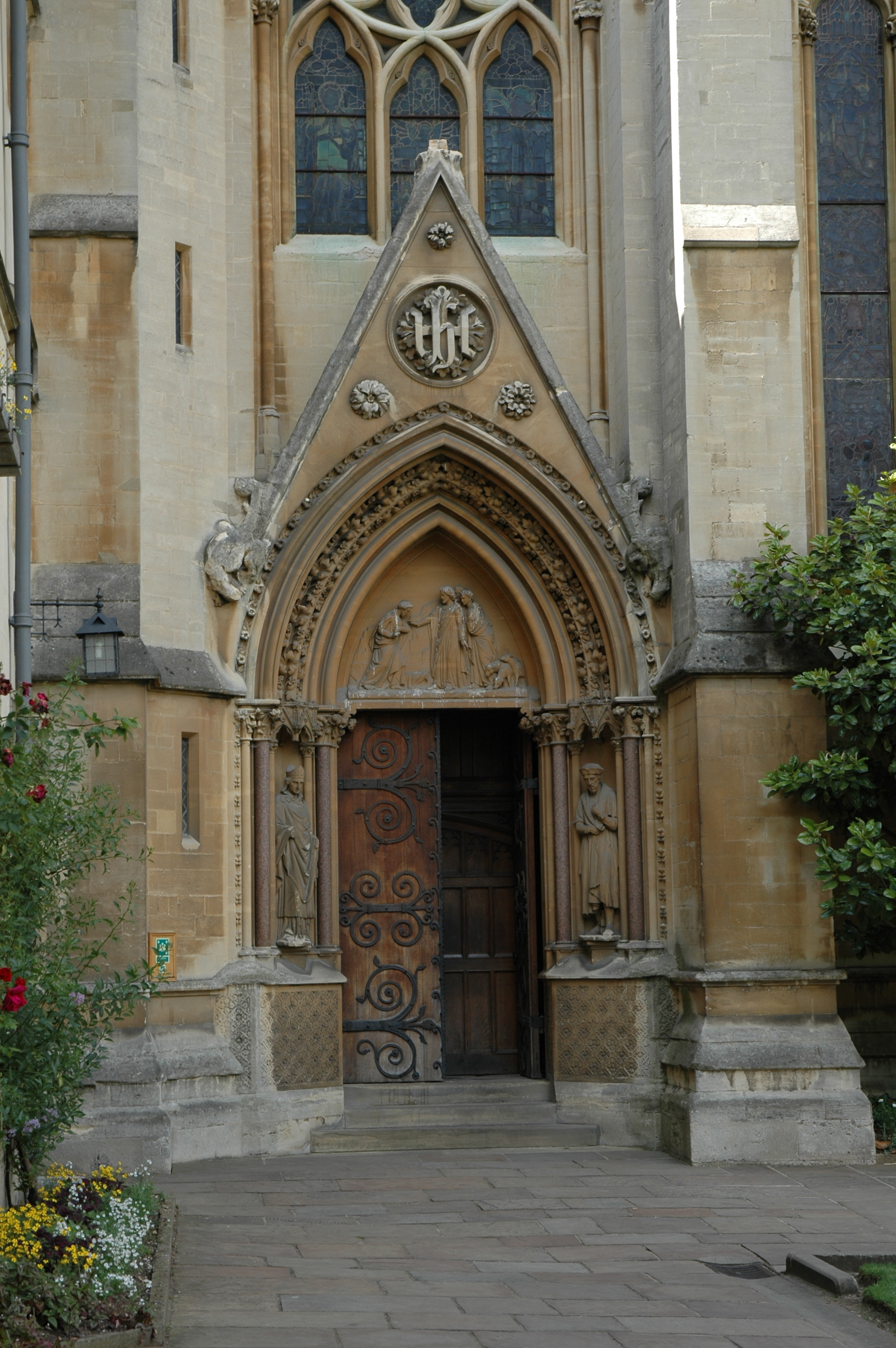
Chapel door, Exeter College, Oxford (1857–59)

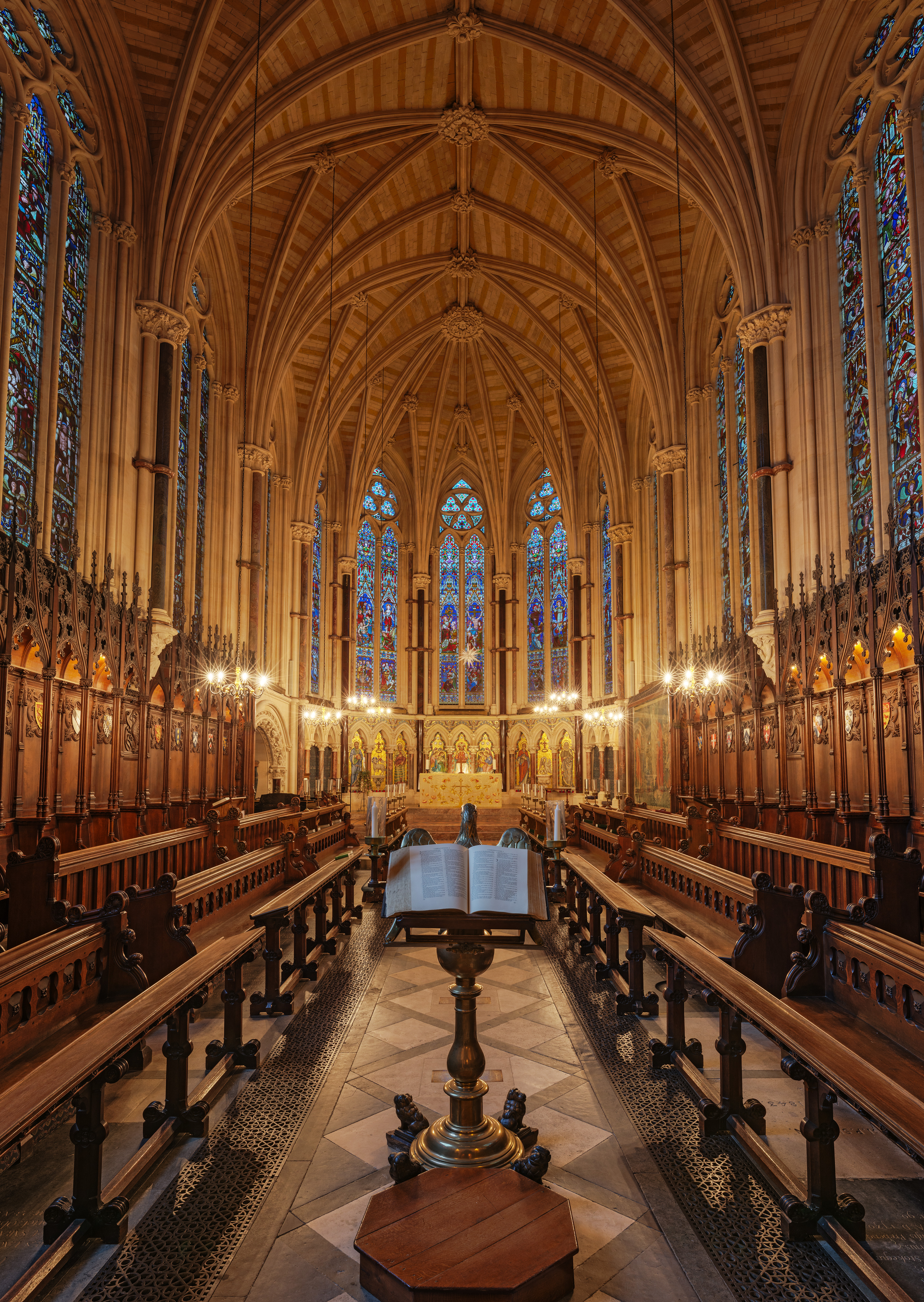
East end, Chapel, Exeter College, Oxford (1857–59)

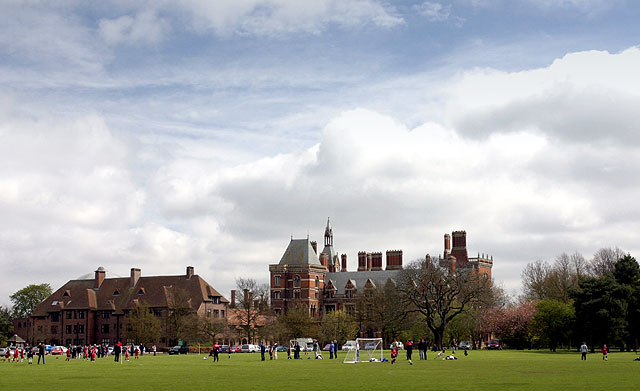
Kelham Hall, Nottinghamshire (1858–62)

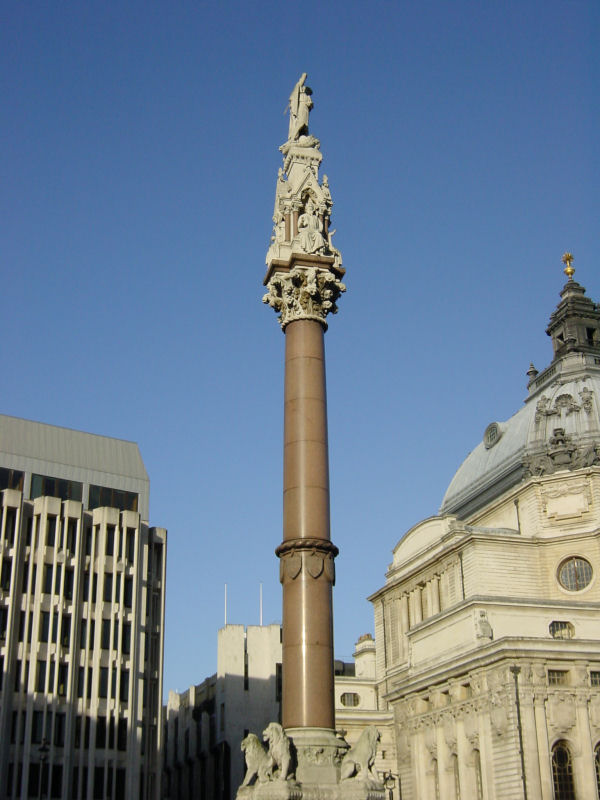
Crimea War Memorial, Westminster School, Broad Sanctuary, Westminster (1858)

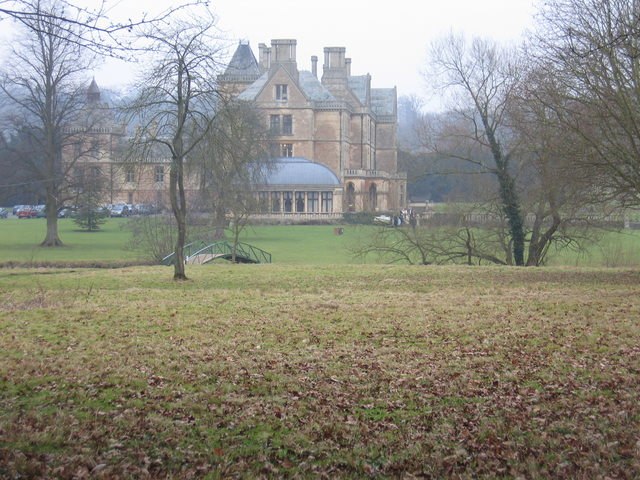
Walton Hall, Warwickshire (c.1858–62)

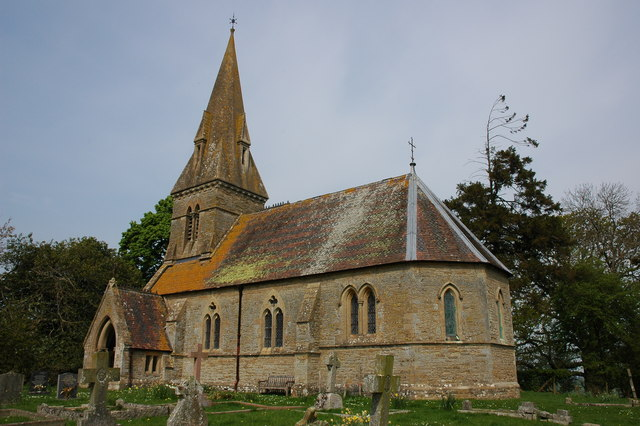
St Mary's, Edwin Loach, Herefordshire (c.1859)

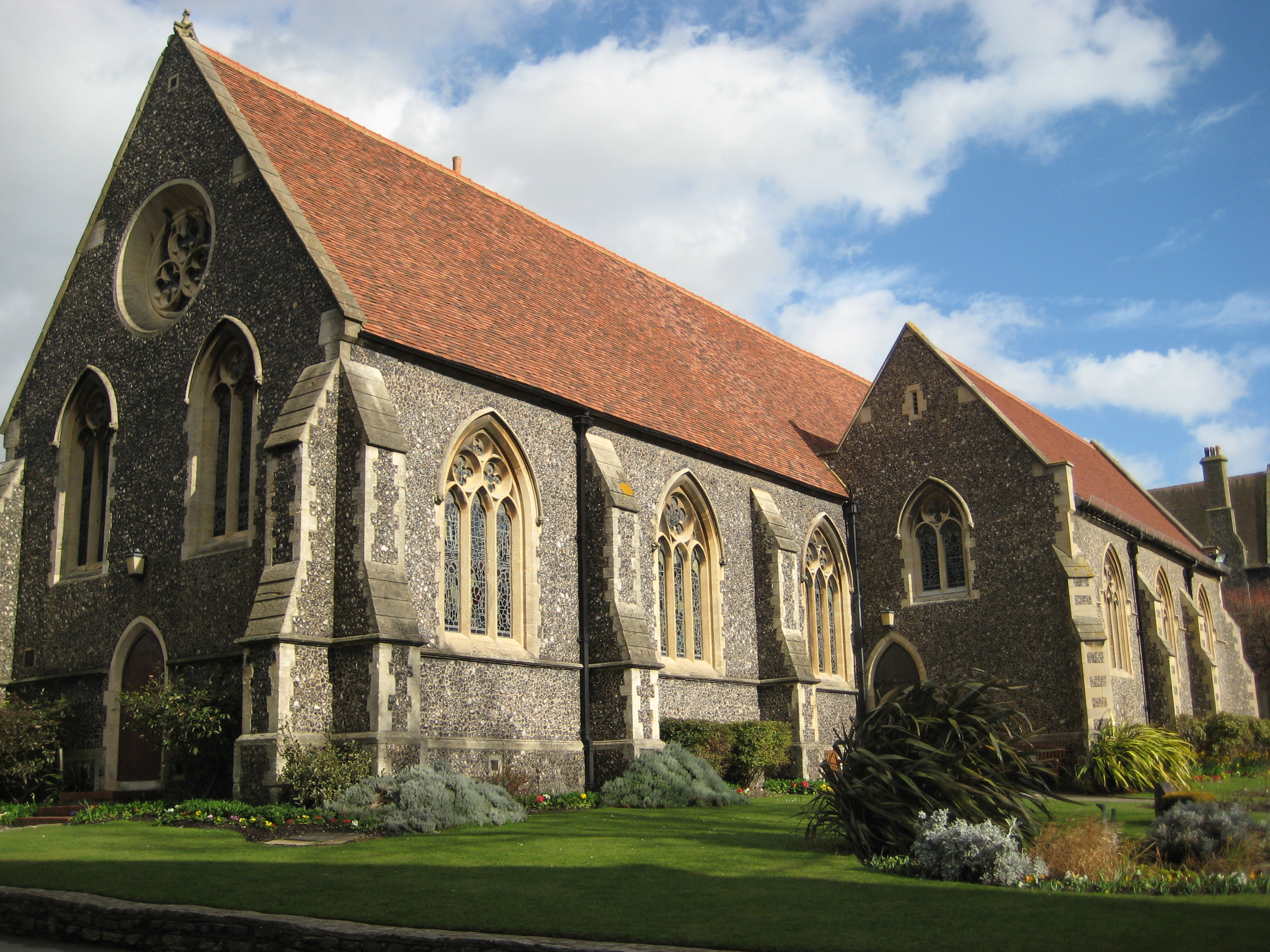
The Chapel, Brighton College (1859)

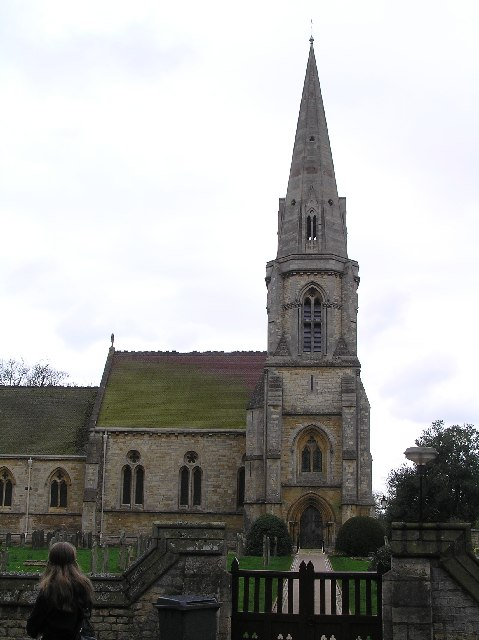
All Saints, Nocton (1860–63)

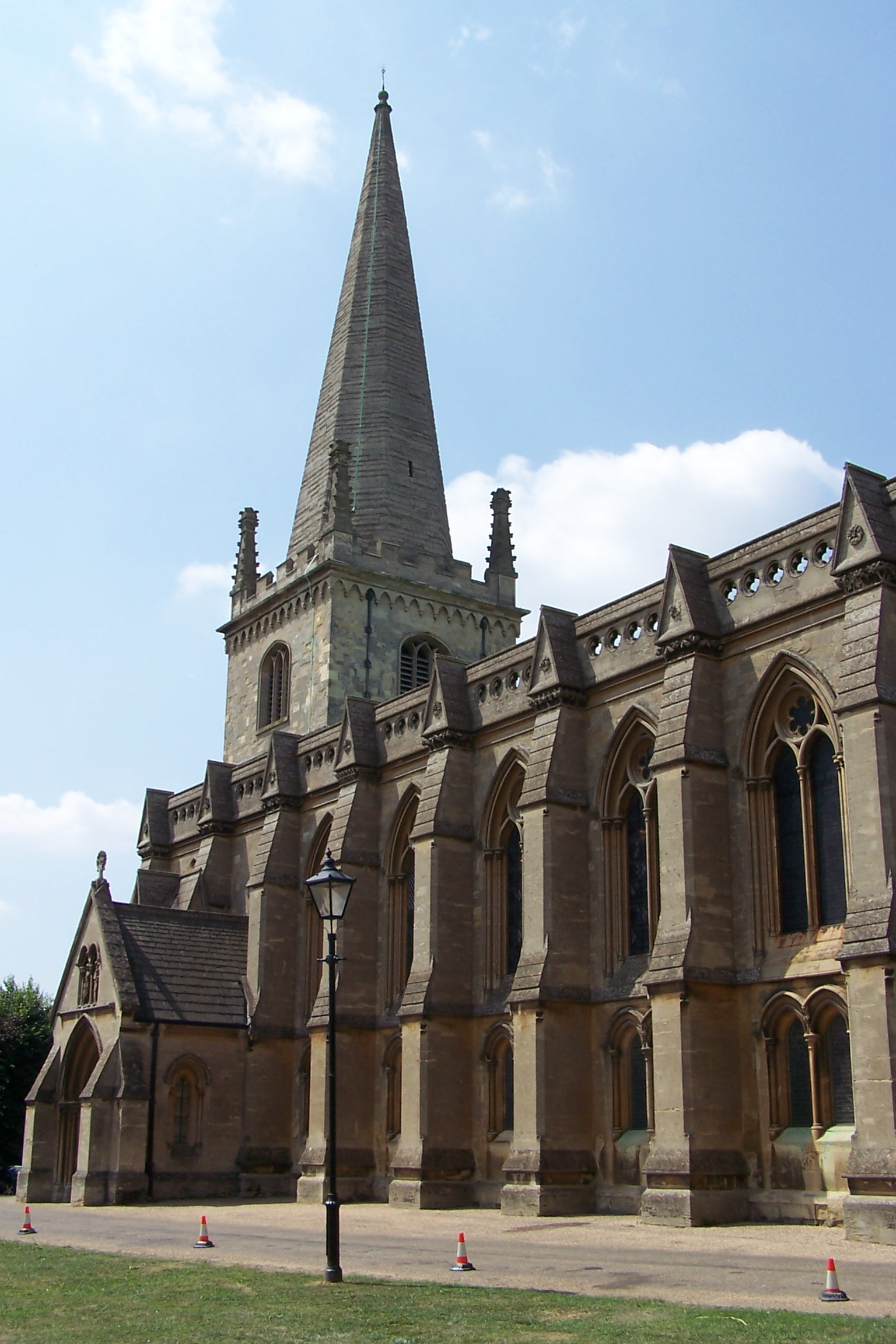
SS. Peter and Paul Church, Buckingham, heavily restored (1860–67)

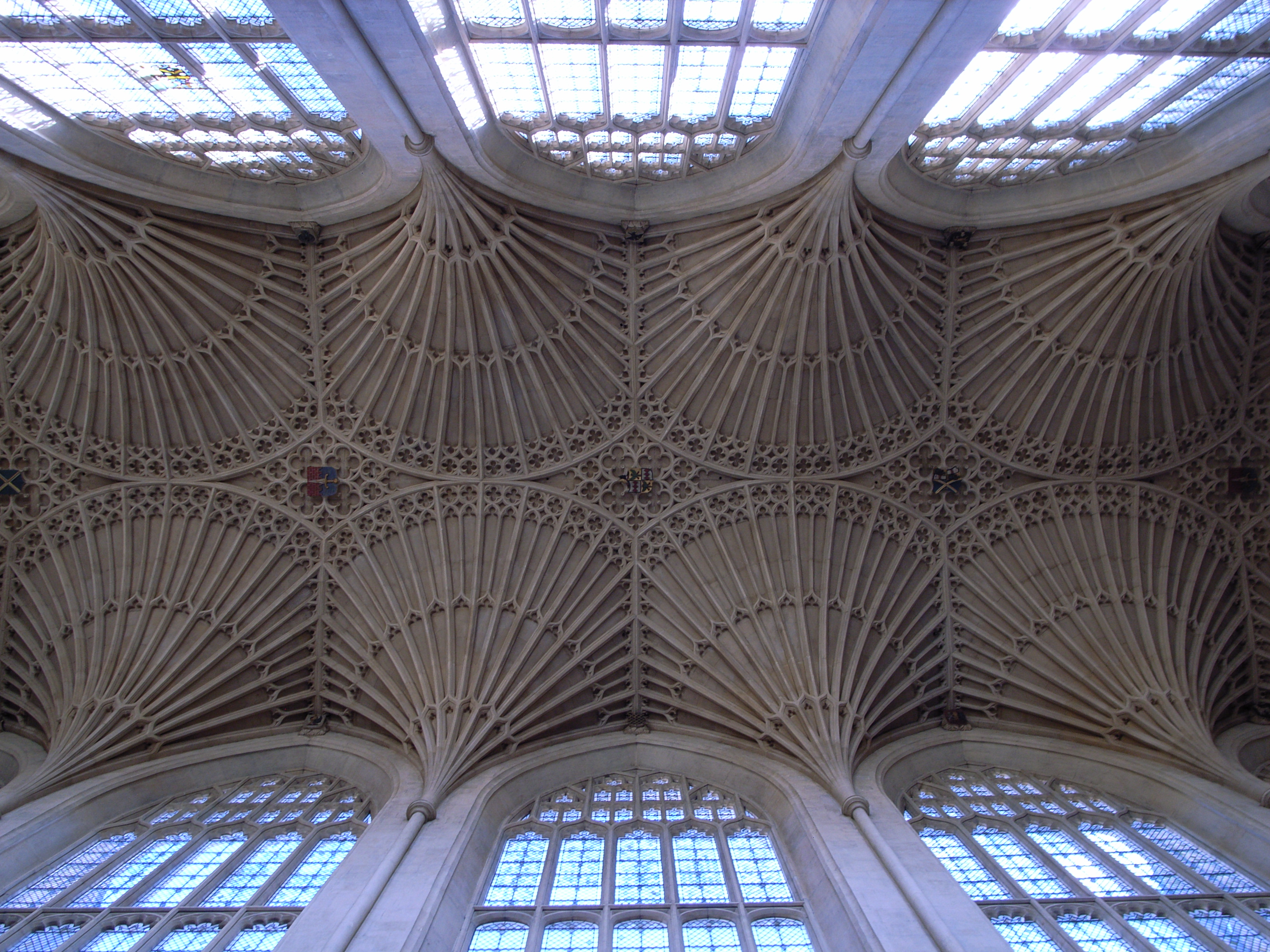
Nave Vault, Bath Abbey (1860–77) (copy of the medieval vault in the chancel)

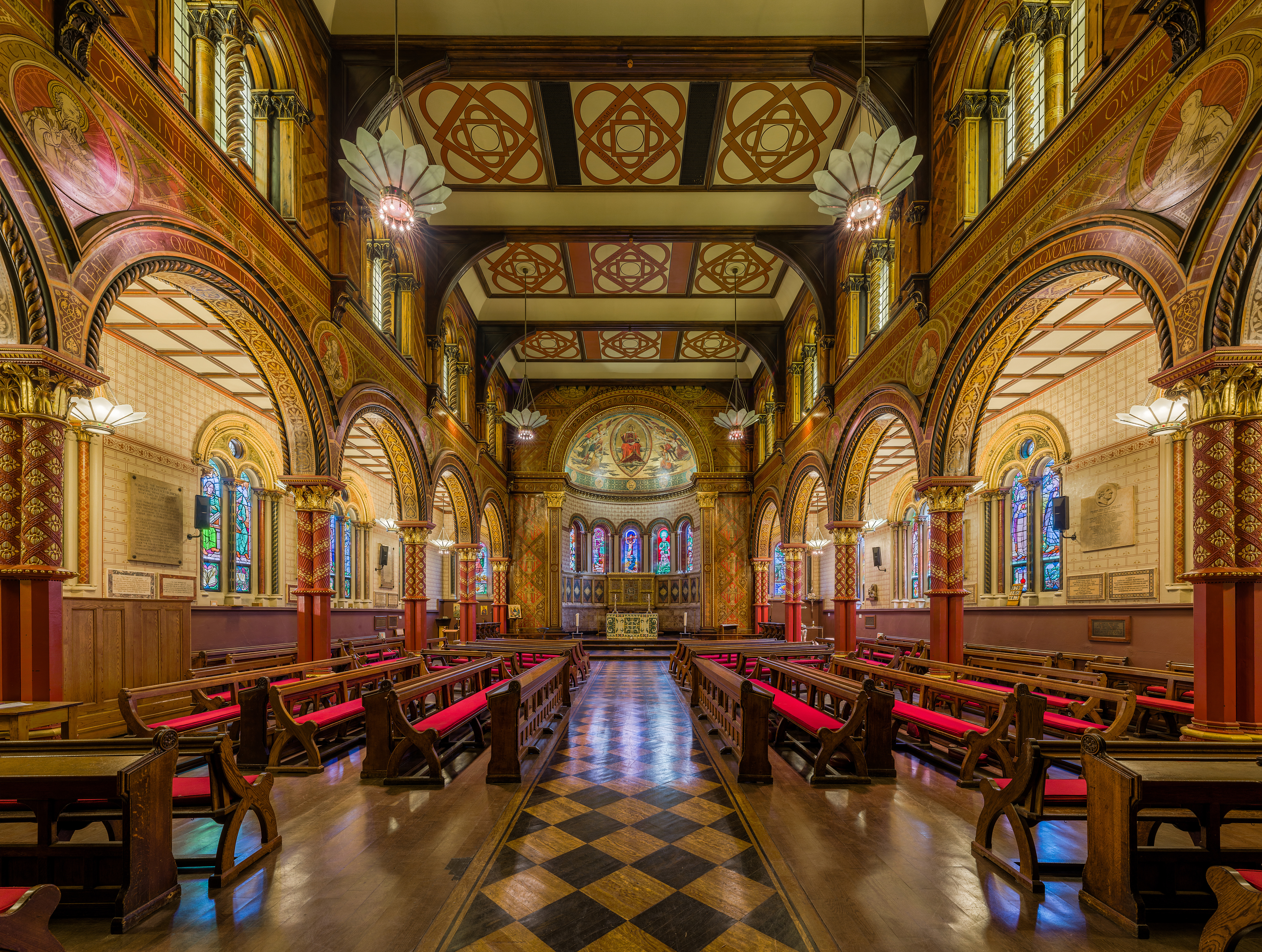
The Chapel, King's College London (1861–62)

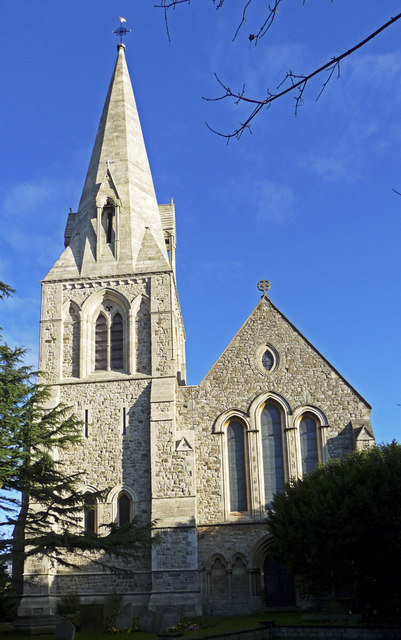
Christ Church, Southgate, London (1861–62)

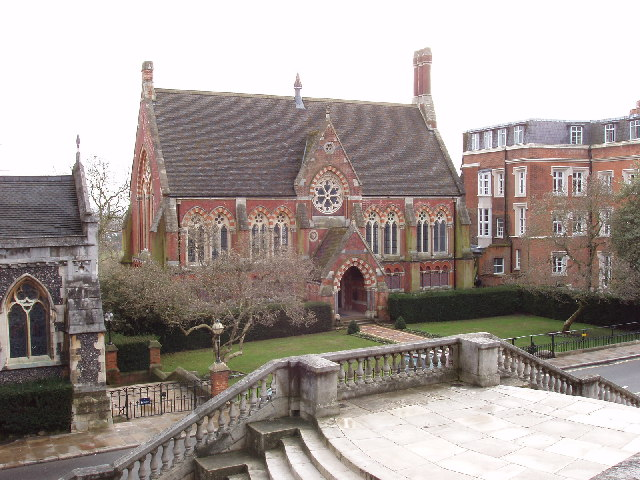
Vaughan Library, Harrow School, London (1861–63)

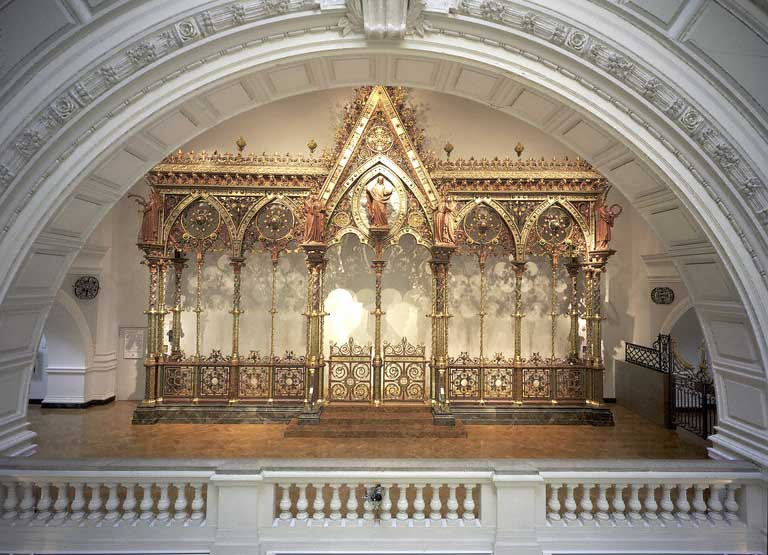
Screen from Hereford Cathedral (1862) now in the Victoria and Albert Museum

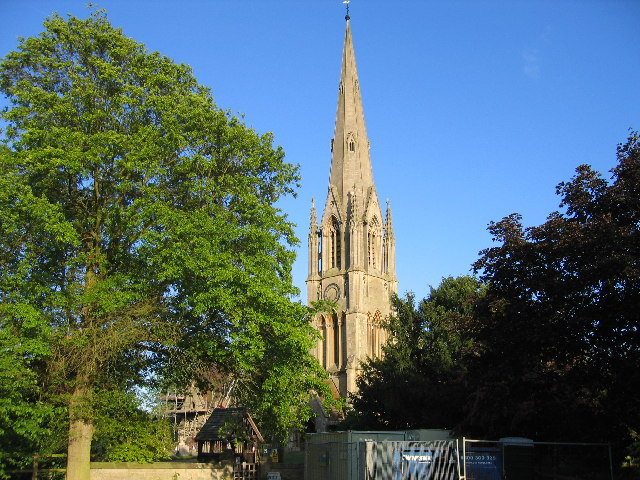
All Saints' Church, Sherbourne, Warwickshire (1862–64)

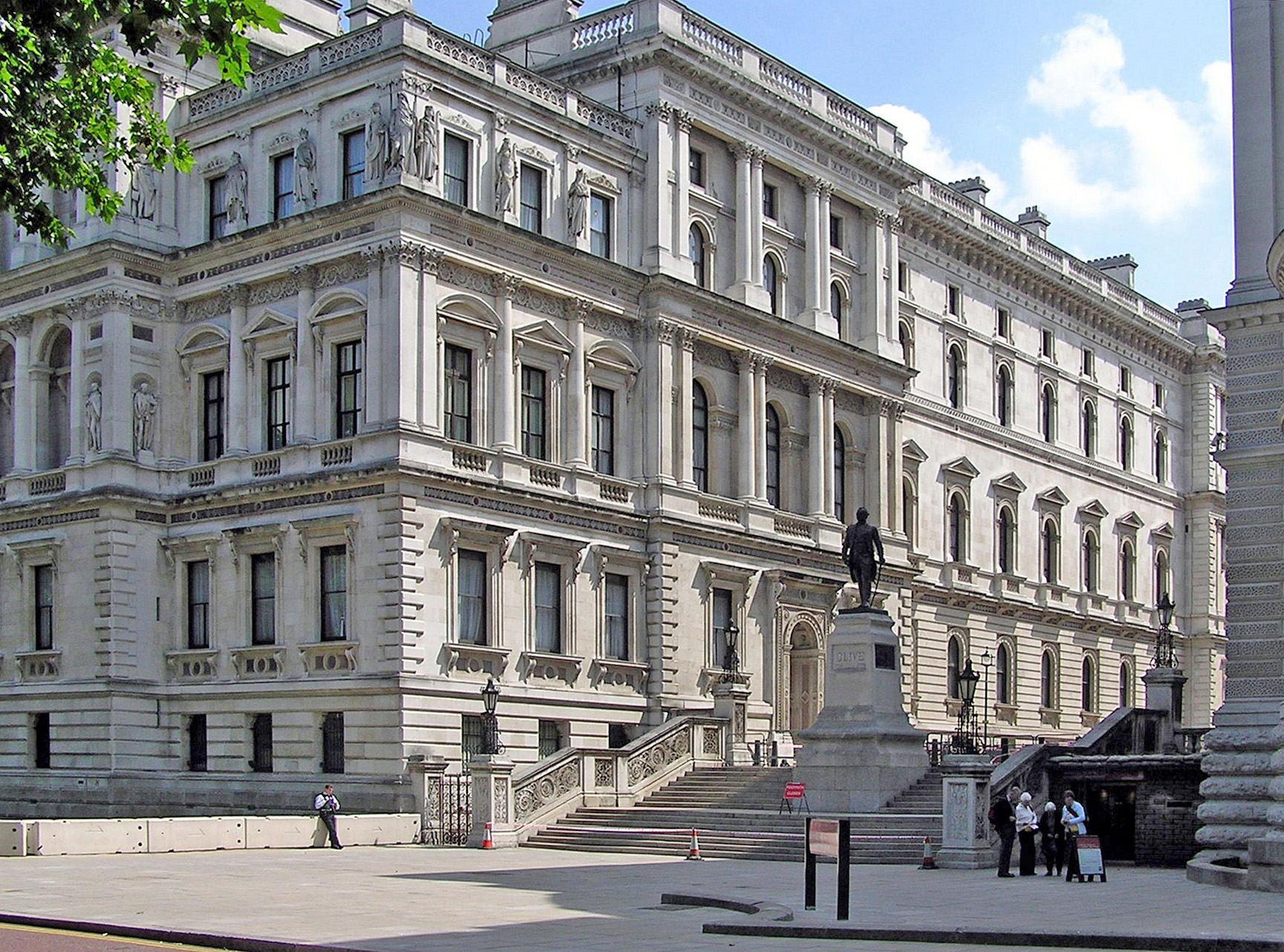
Foreign and Commonwealth Office, London (1862–75)

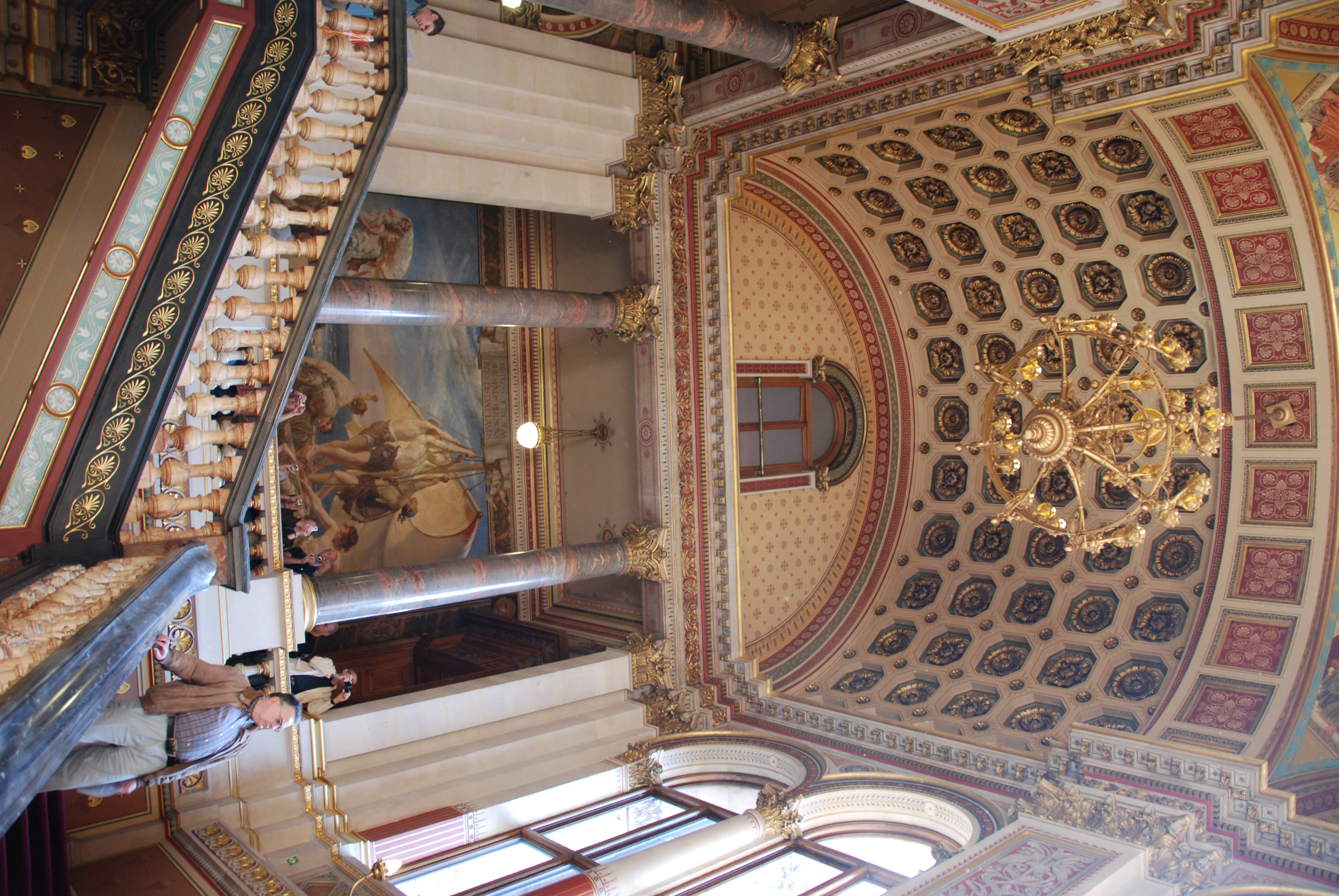
Grand Staircase, Foreign and Commonwealth Office, London (1862–75)

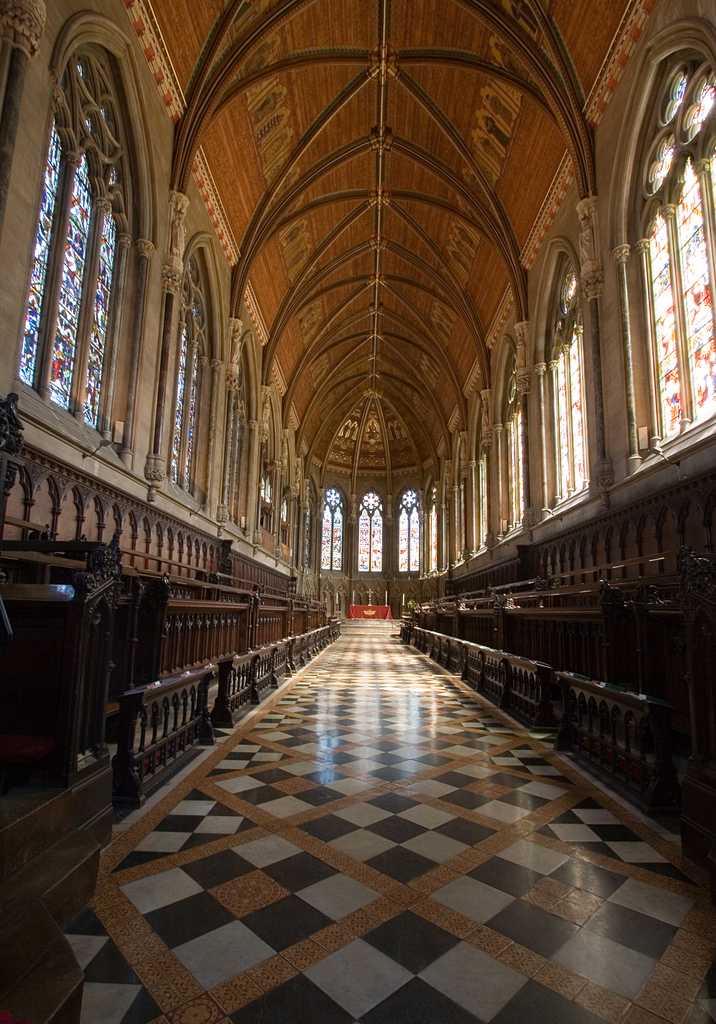
Looking east, St John's College Chapel, Cambridge (1863–69)

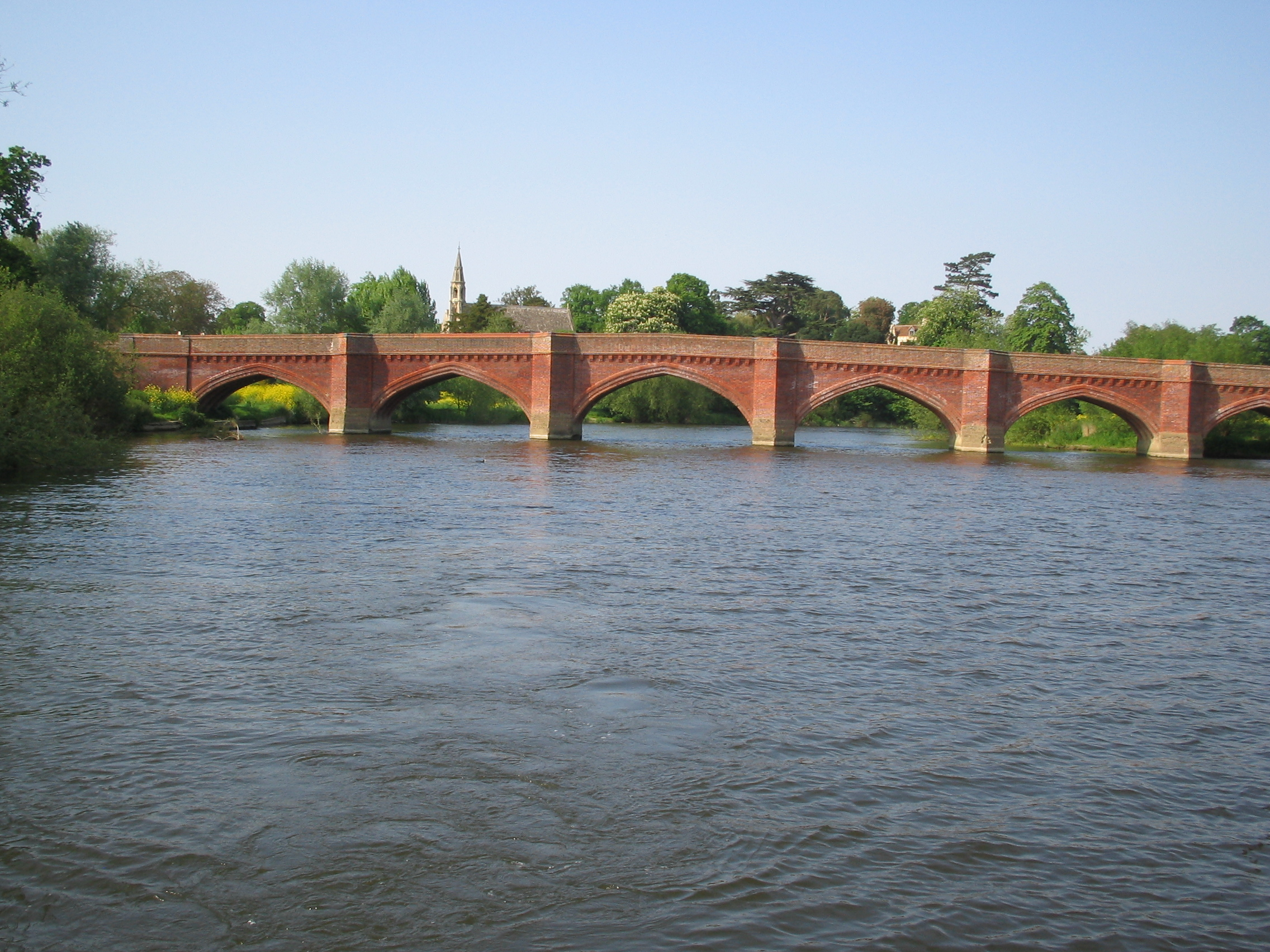
Clifton Hampden Bridge, Oxfordshire (1864)

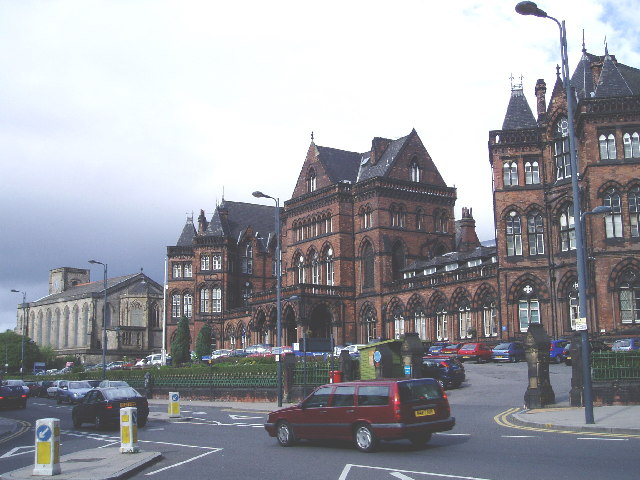
Leeds General Infirmary (1864–70)

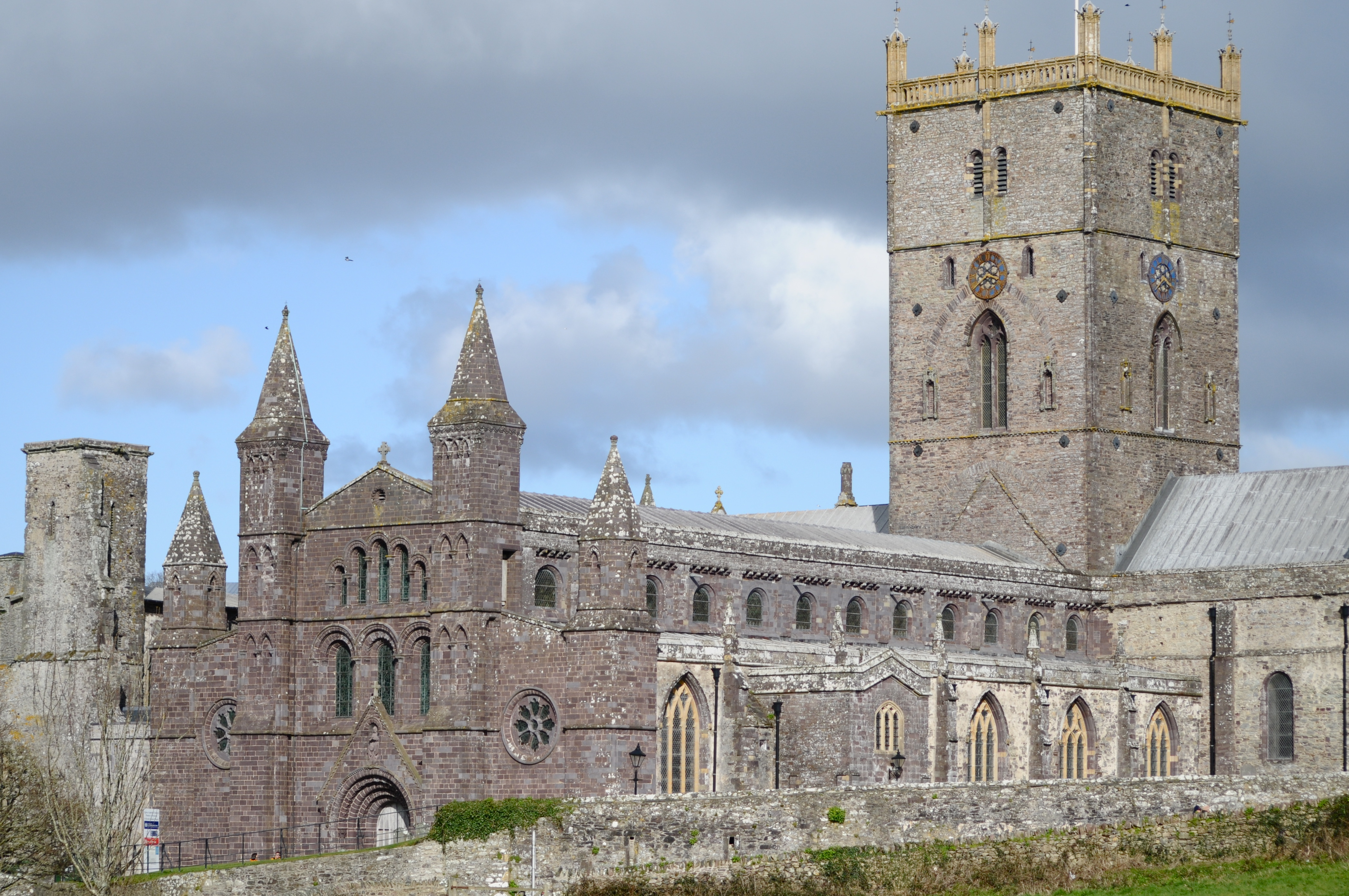
St David's Cathedral, Pembrokeshire, showing Scott's west front (1864–76)

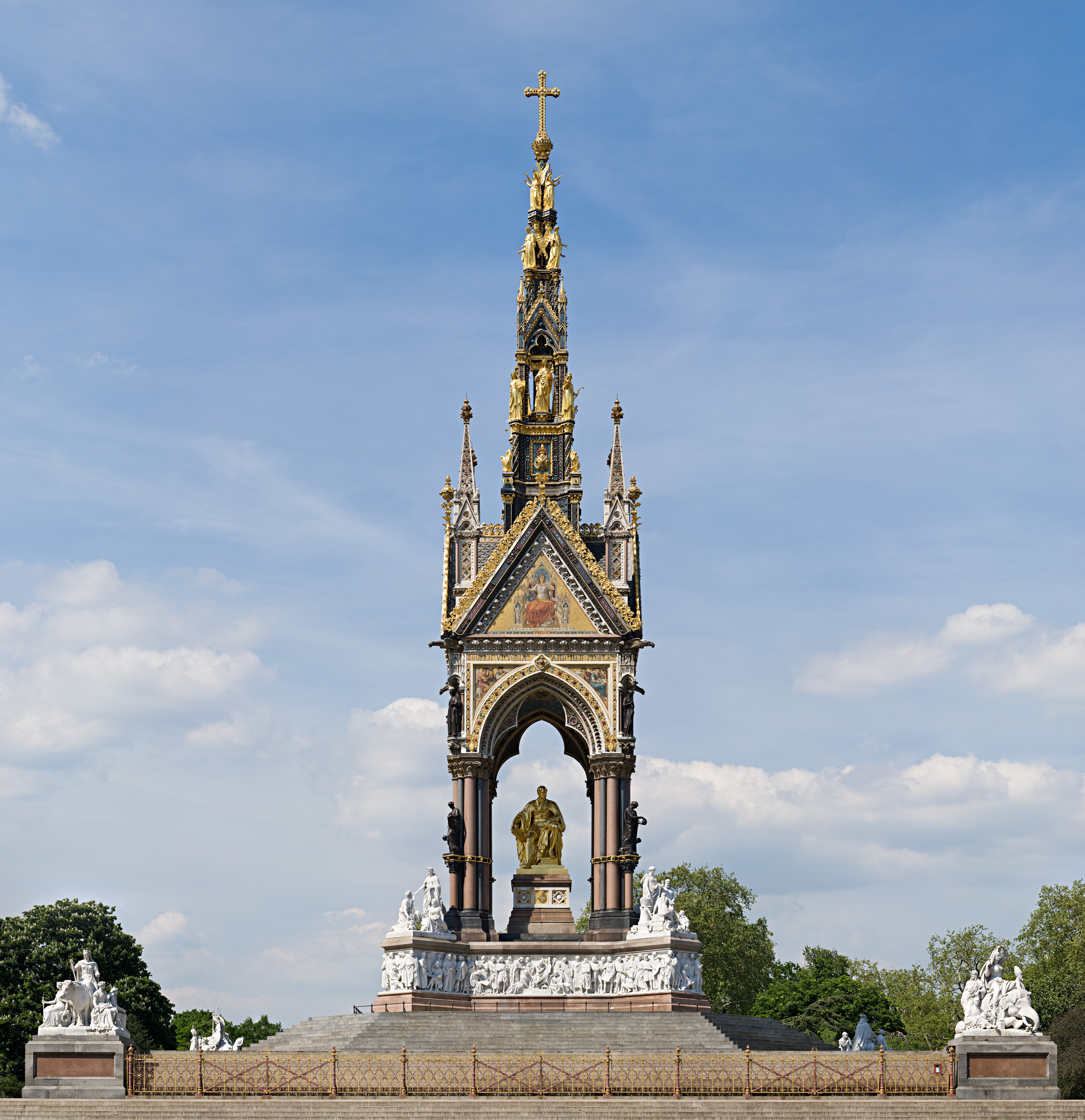
Albert Memorial, London (1864–76)

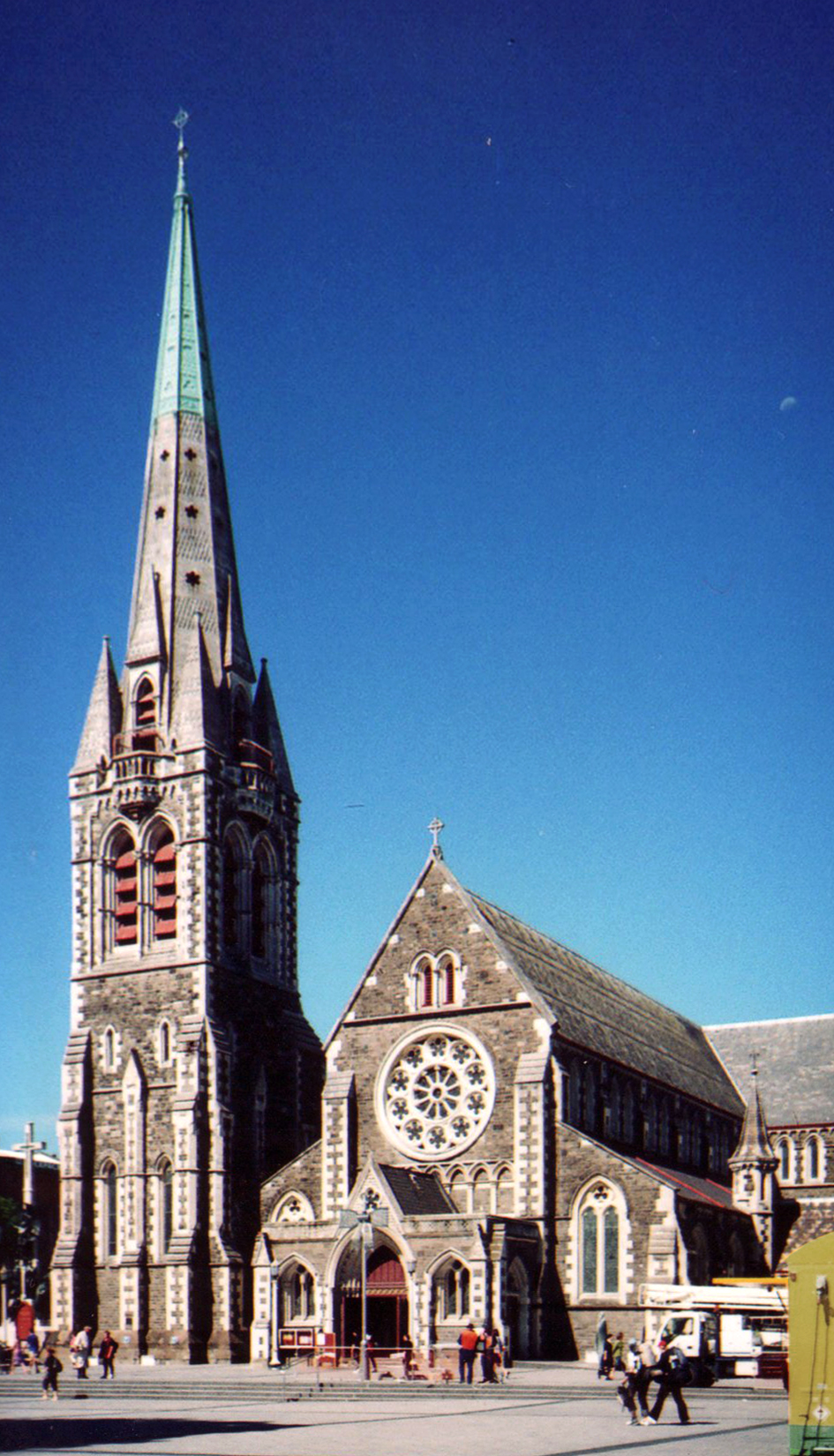
ChristChurch Cathedral, Christchurch, New Zealand (1864–1904)

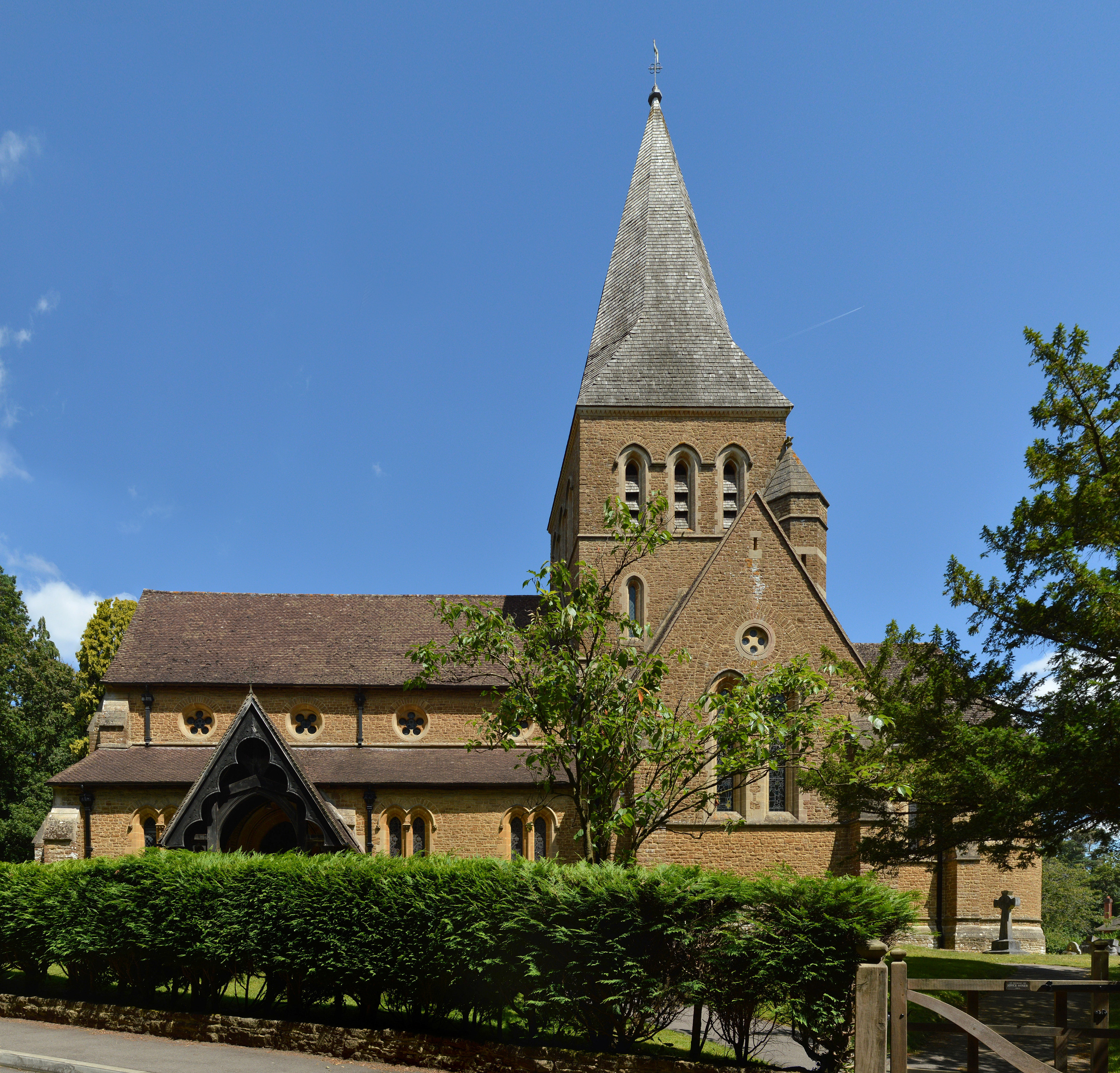
St Mary's Church, Norney, Shackleford, Surrey (1865)

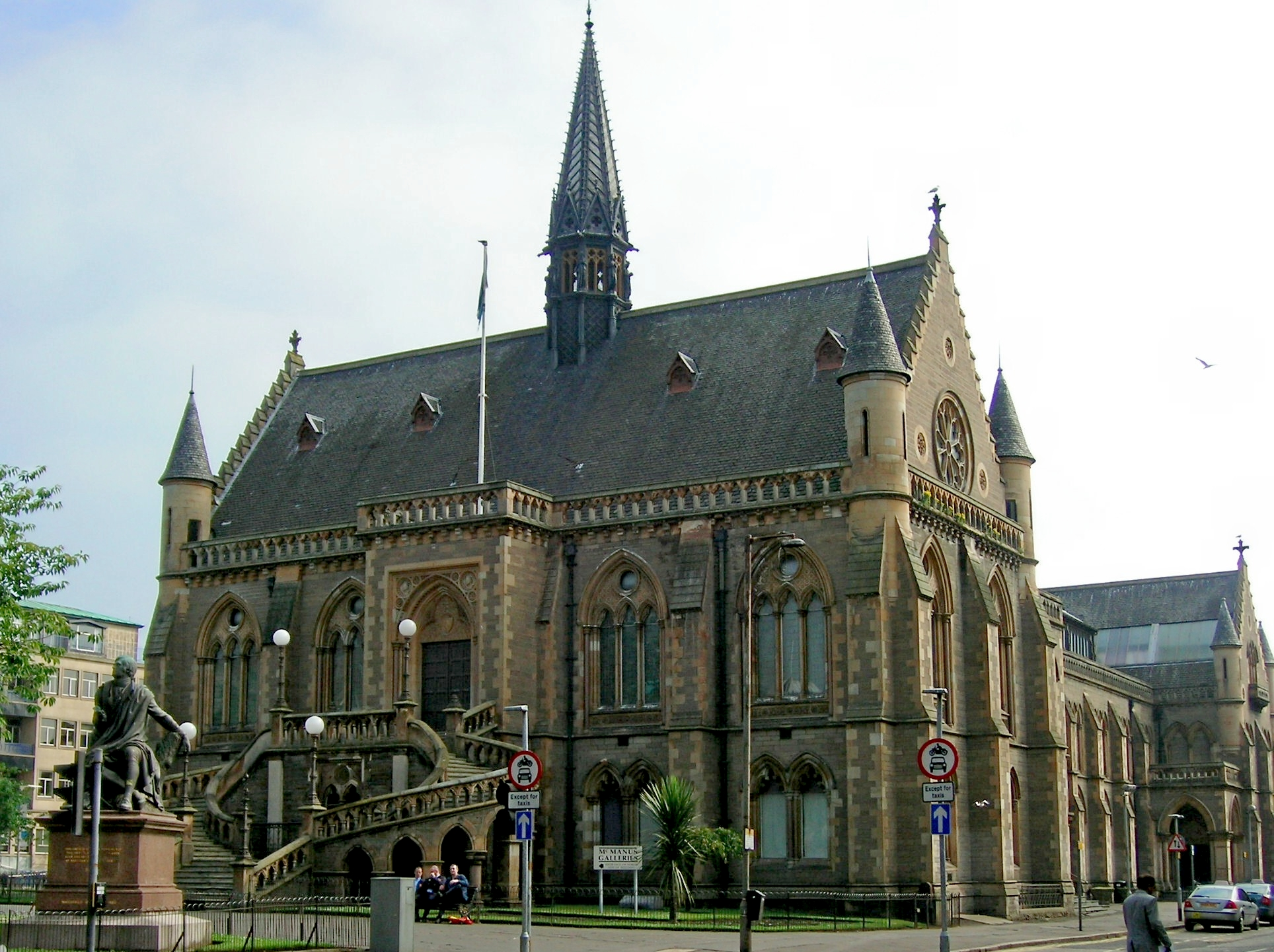
Former Albert Institute Dundee (1865–69)

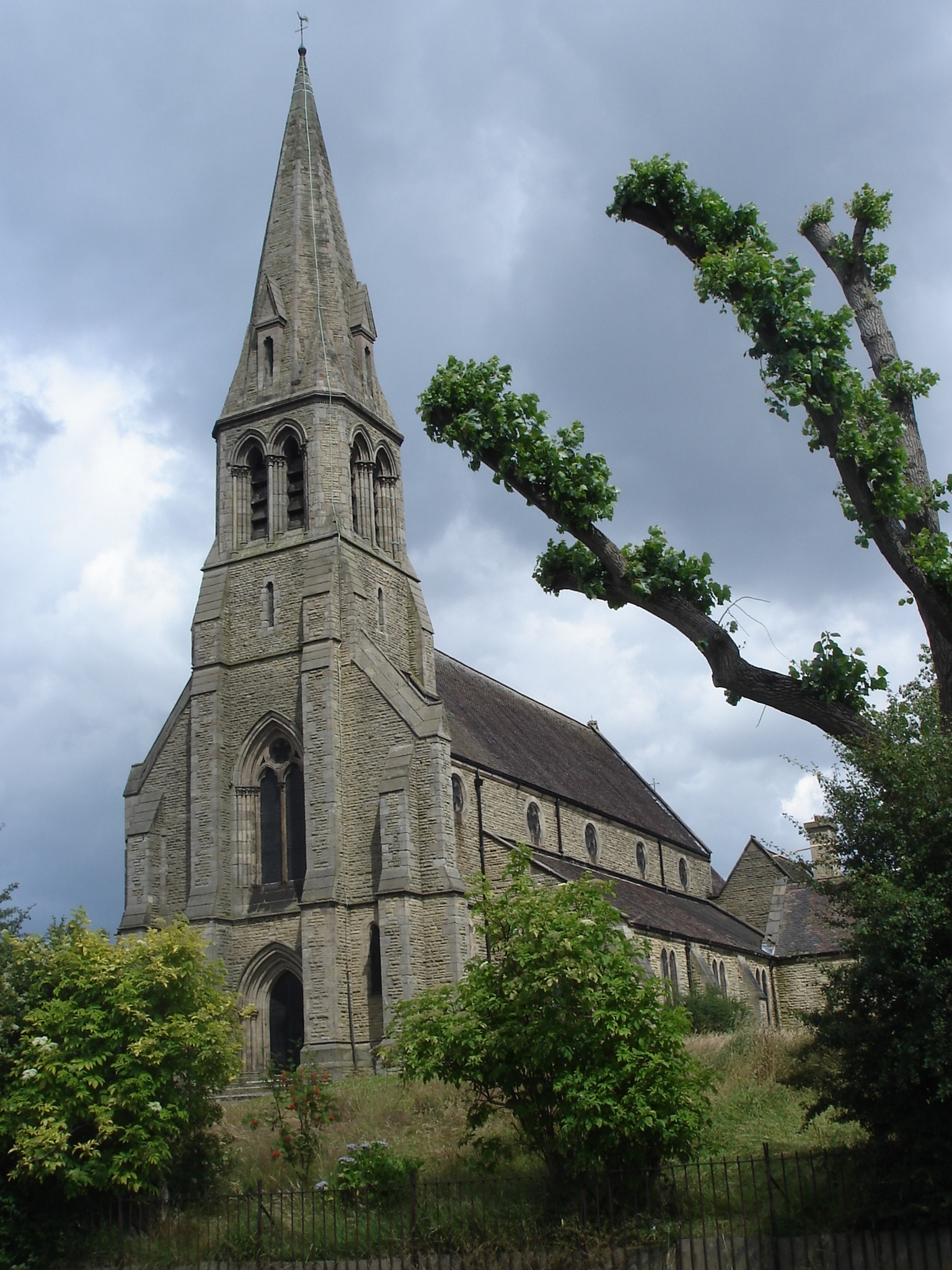
St Luke's church, Salford (1865)

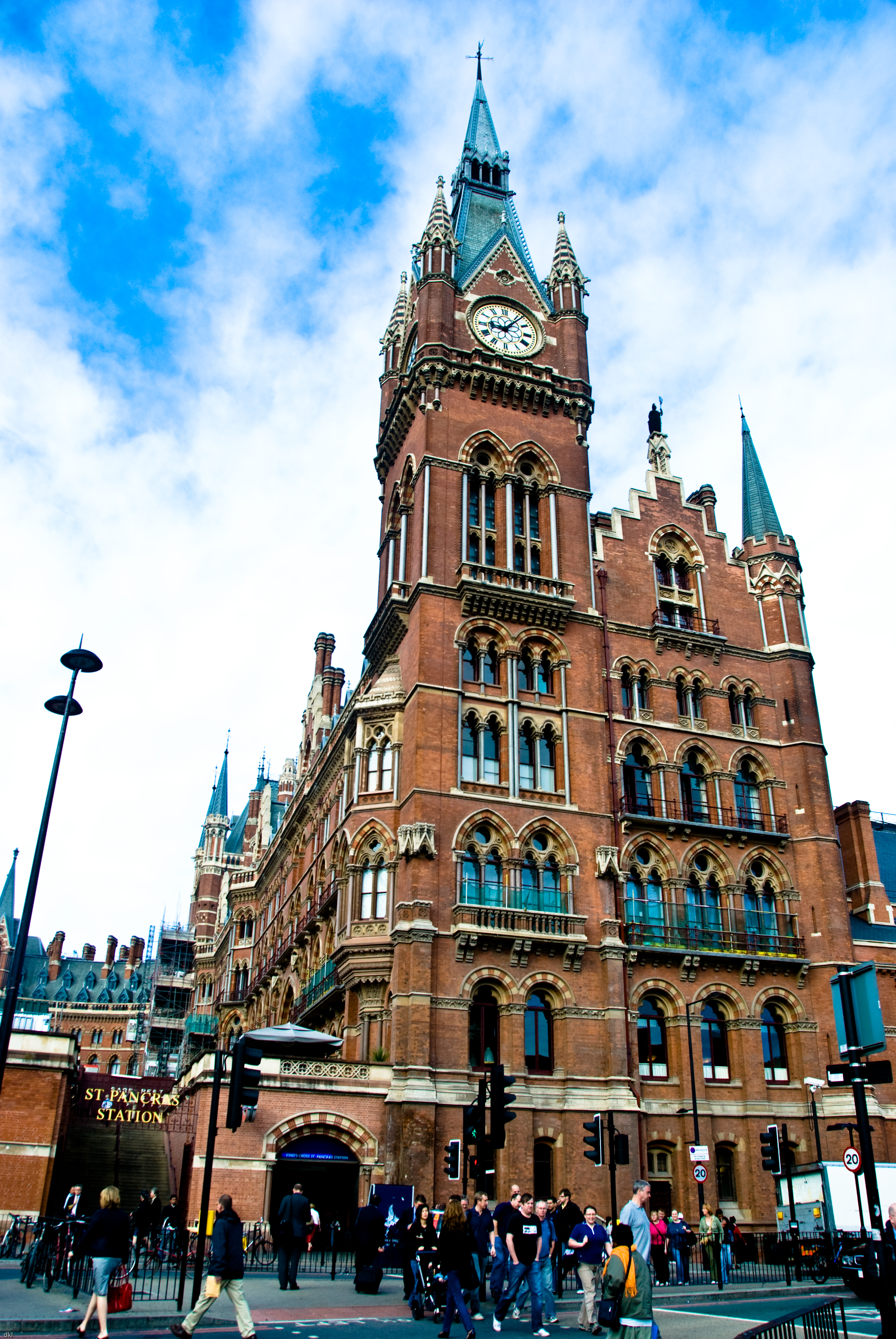
Former Midland Grand Hotel, St Pancras Station (1866–76)

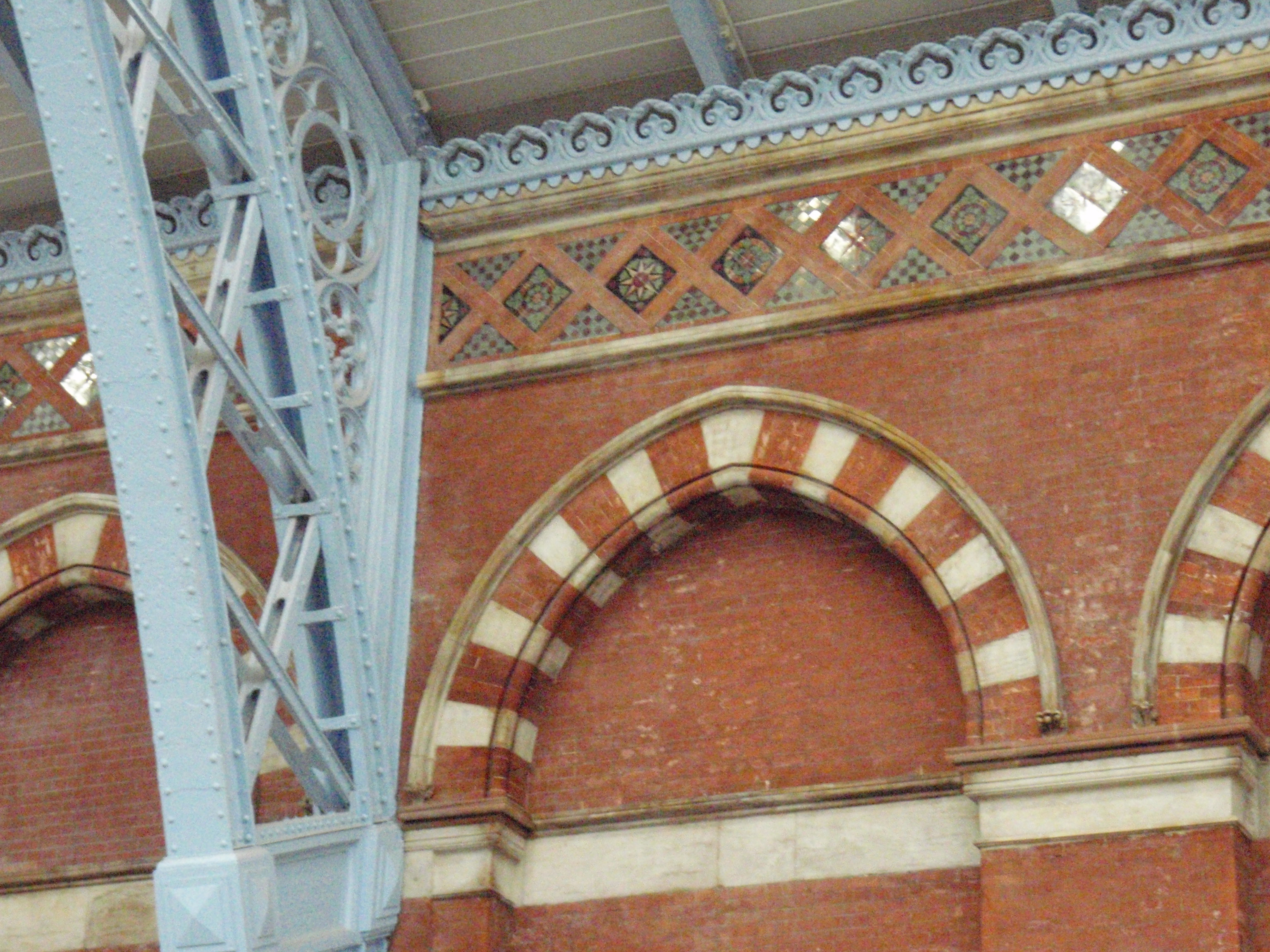
Detail of decoration in the Train Shed, St Pancras Station (1866–76)

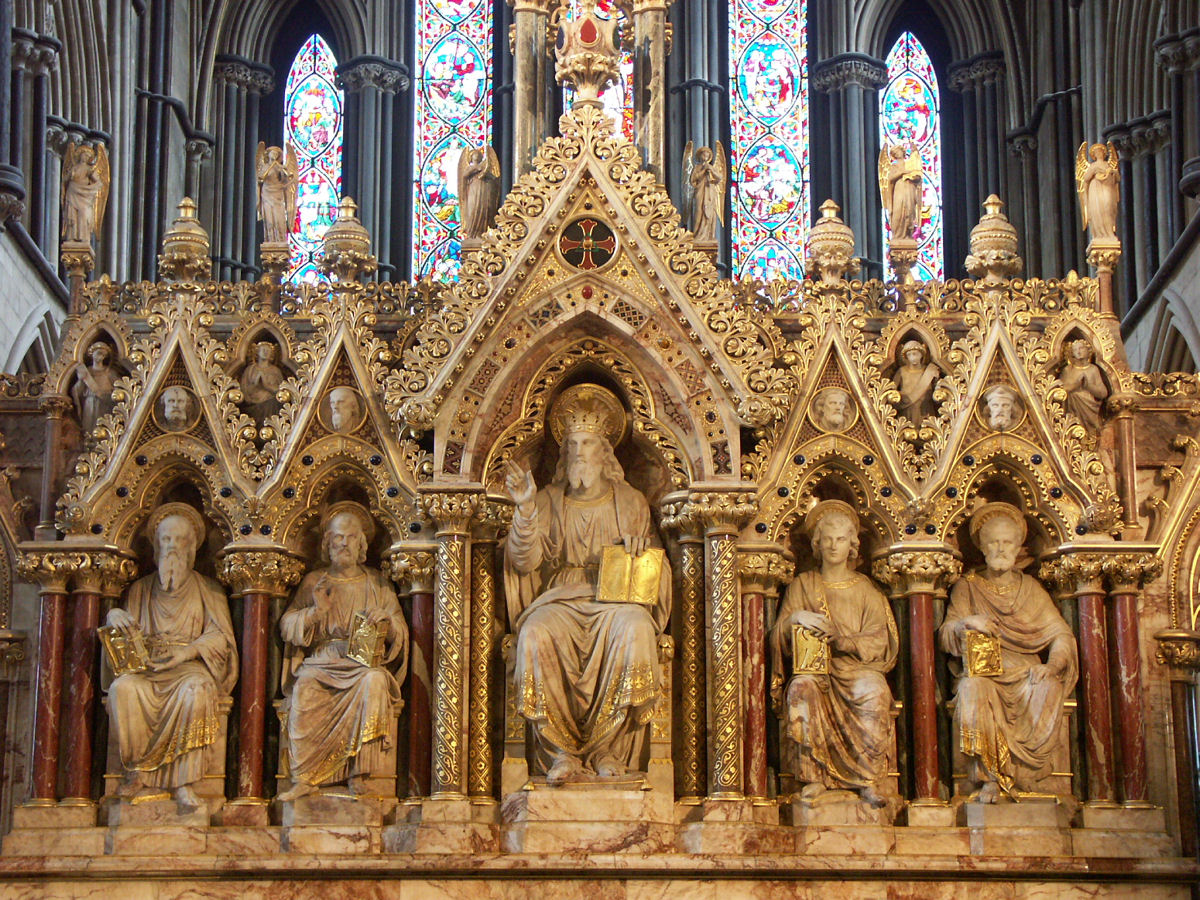
Reredos high altar, Worcester Cathedral (1867–68)

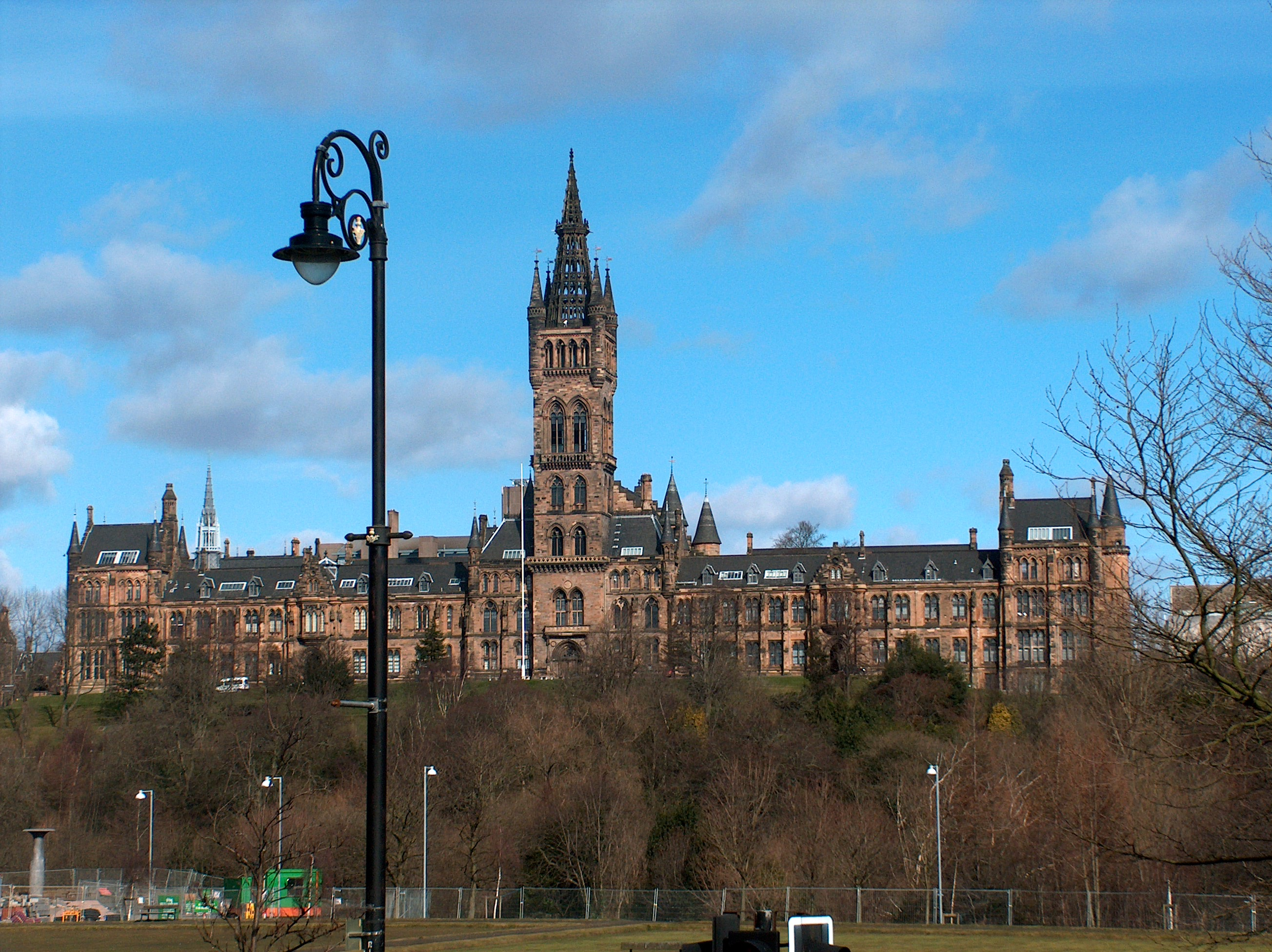
University of Glasgow (1867–70), spire added after Scott's death by his son John Oldrid Scott

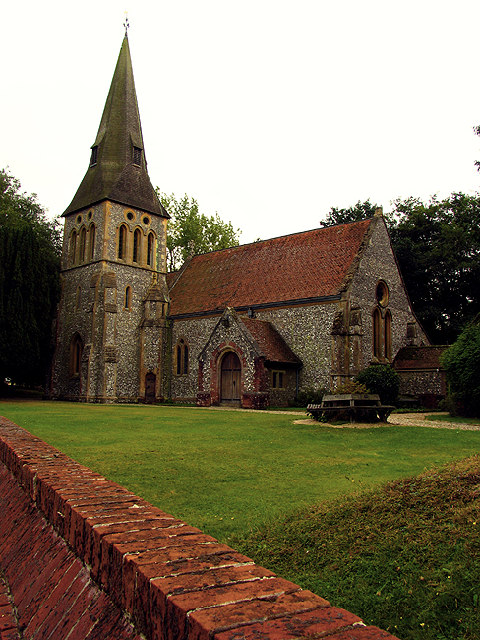
Highclere Church, Hampshire (1869–70)

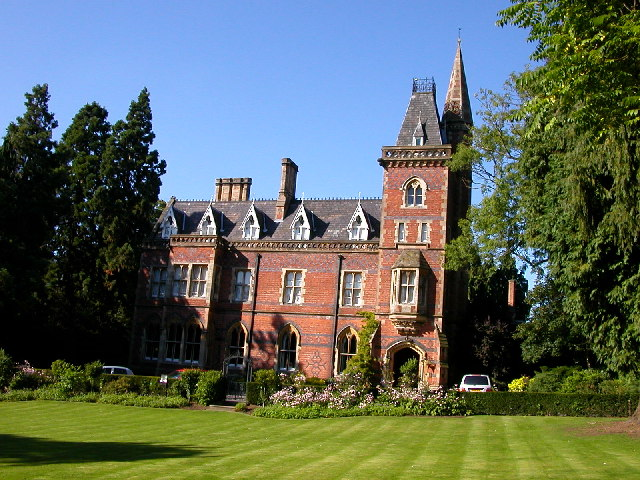
Brownsover Hall, Warwickshire (c.1870)

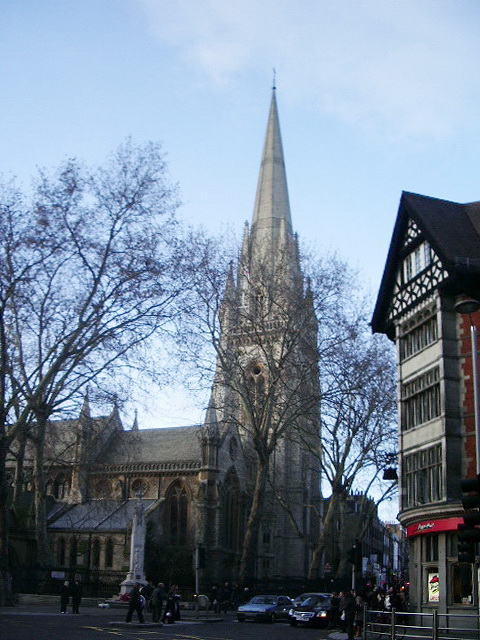
St Mary Abbots Church, Kensington (1870–72)

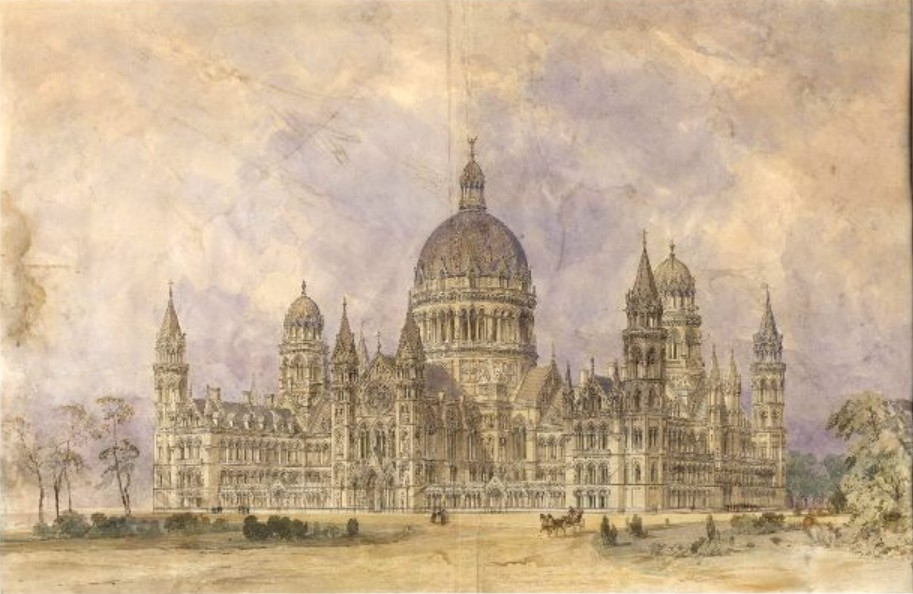
Design for Reichstag, Berlin, not executed (1872)

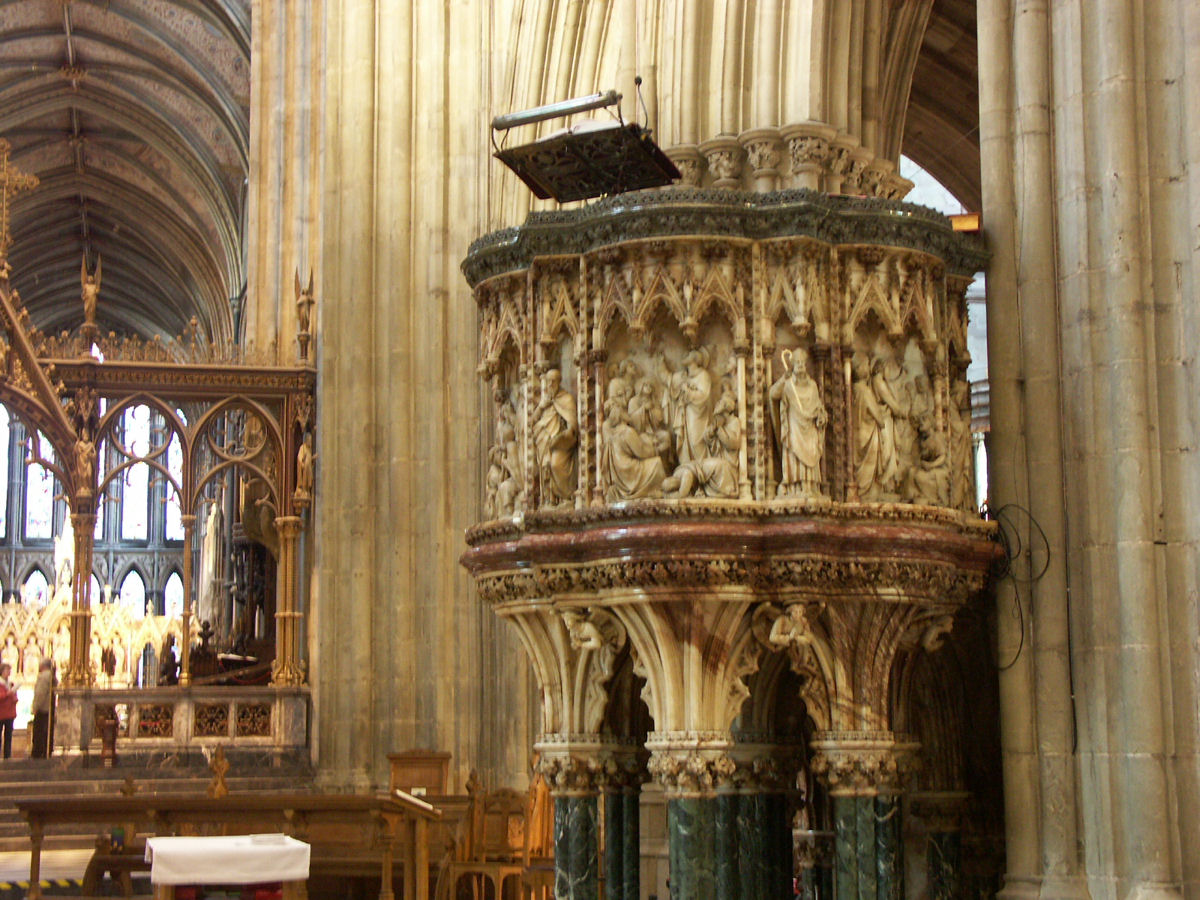
Pulpit, Worcester Cathedral (1873–74)

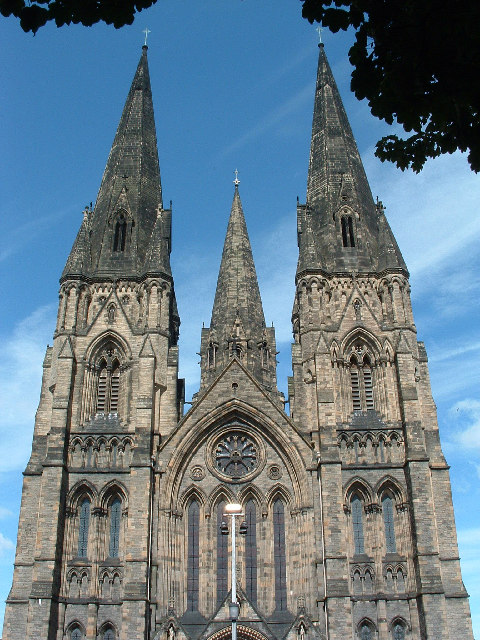
West front, St Mary's Cathedral, Edinburgh (1874–80)

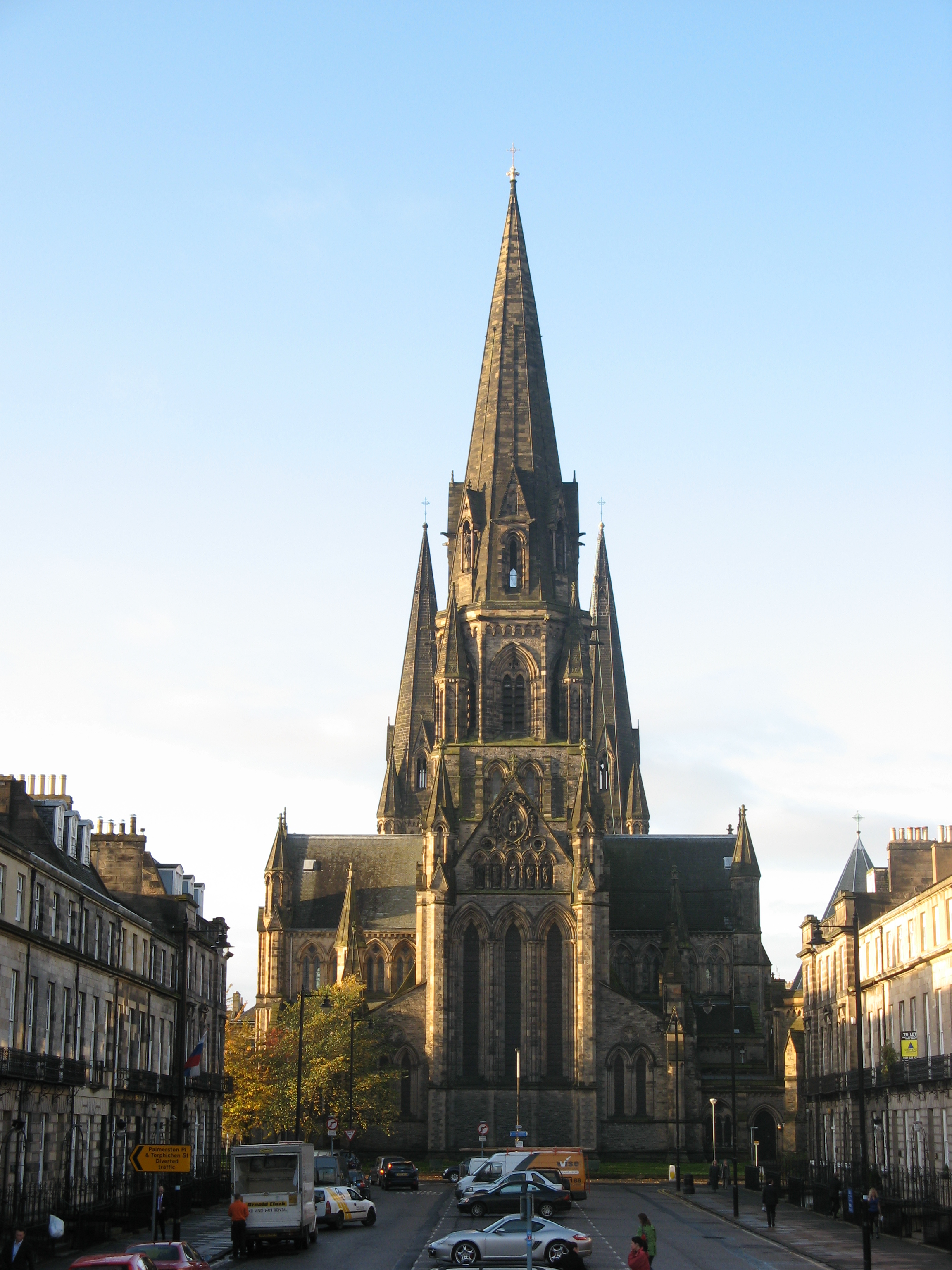
East front, St Mary's Cathedral, Edinburgh (1874–80)

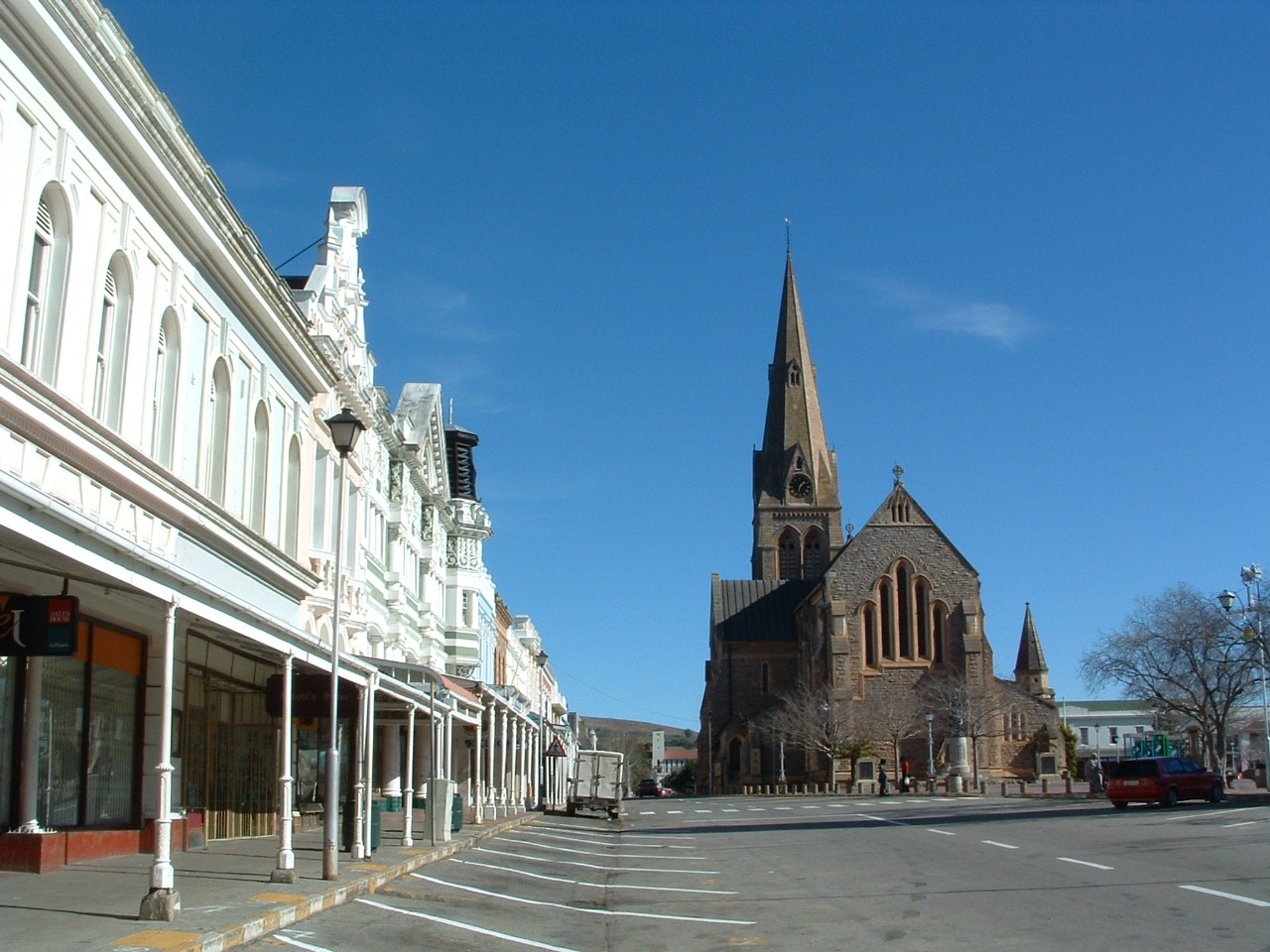
Grahamstown Cathedral, South Africa (1874–78) & finished (1893)

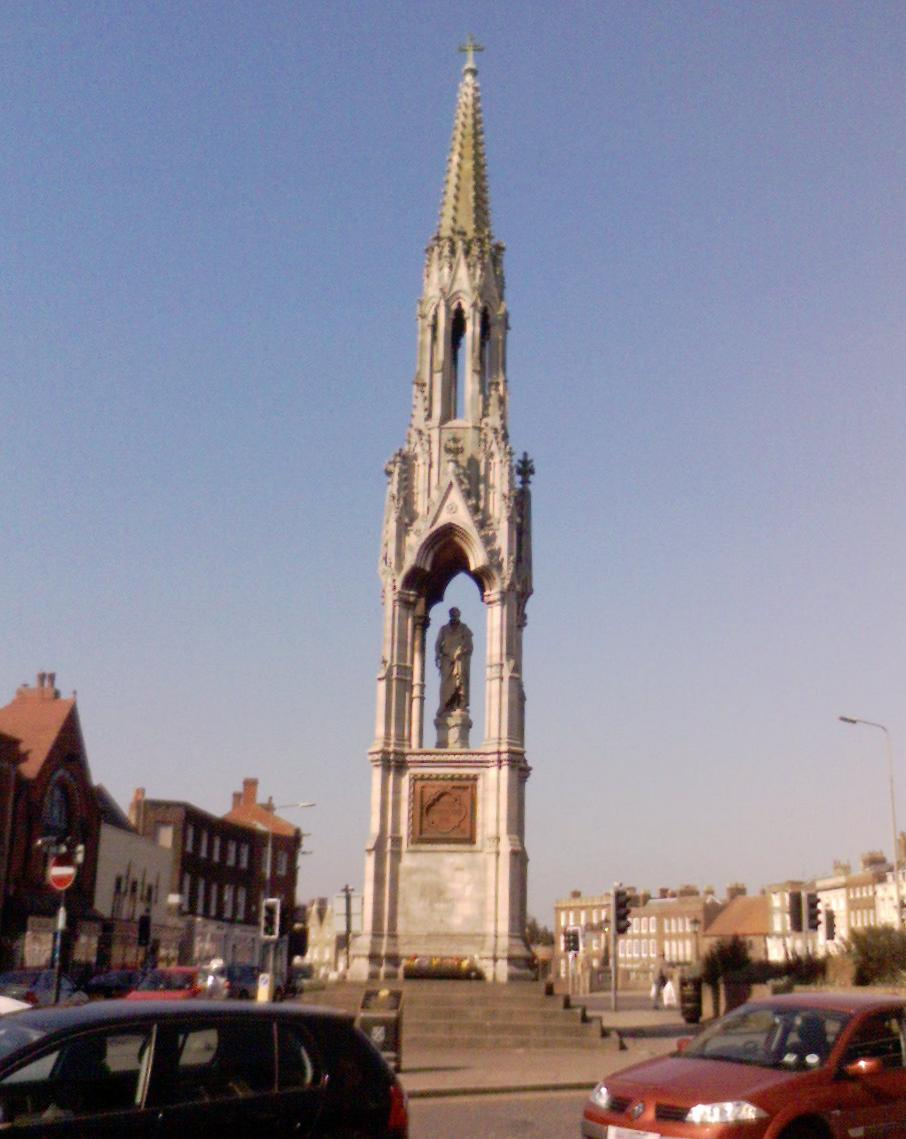
Clarkson Memorial, Wisbech, (1880–81)

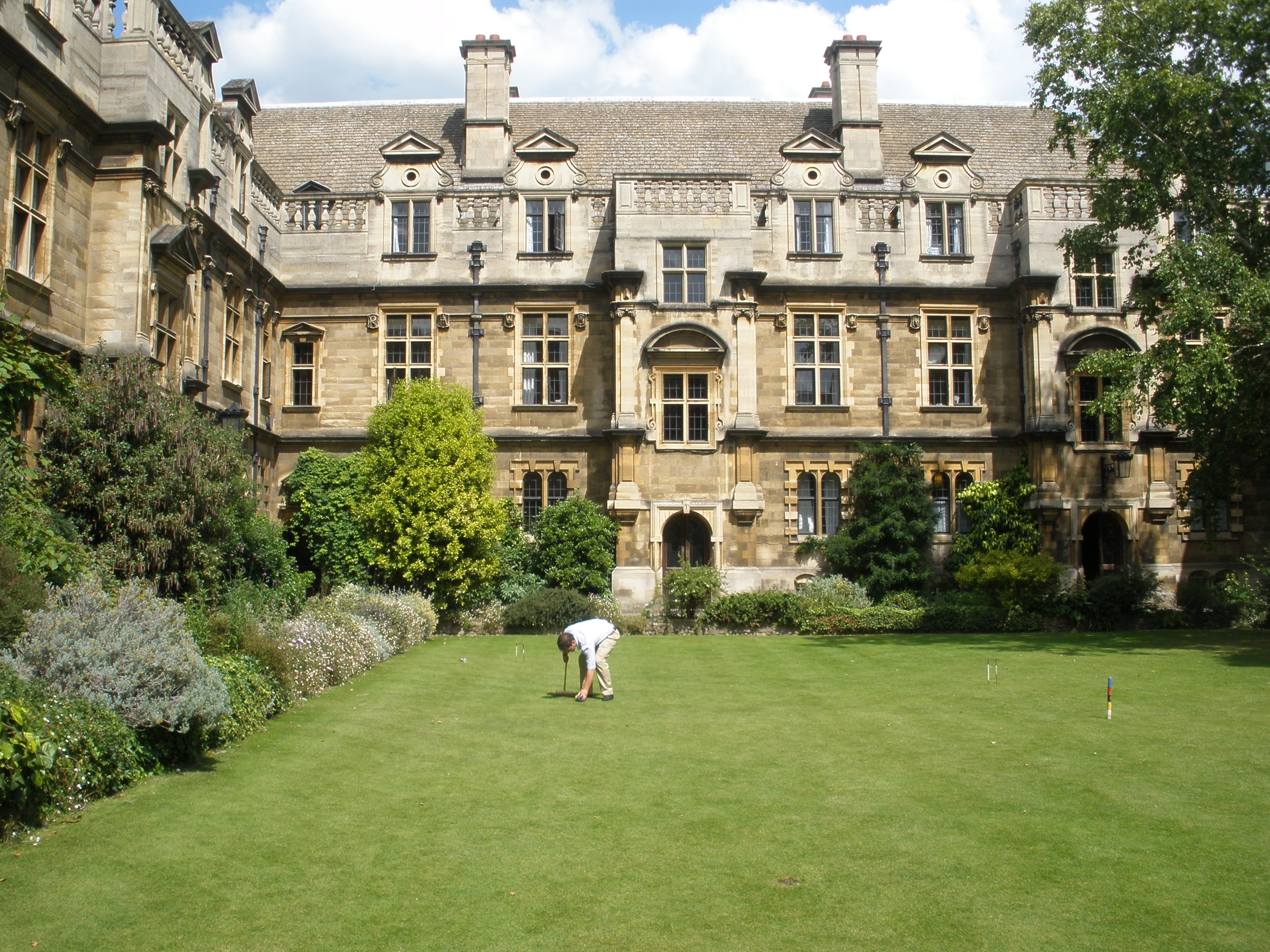
New Court, Pembroke College, Cambridge (1881)

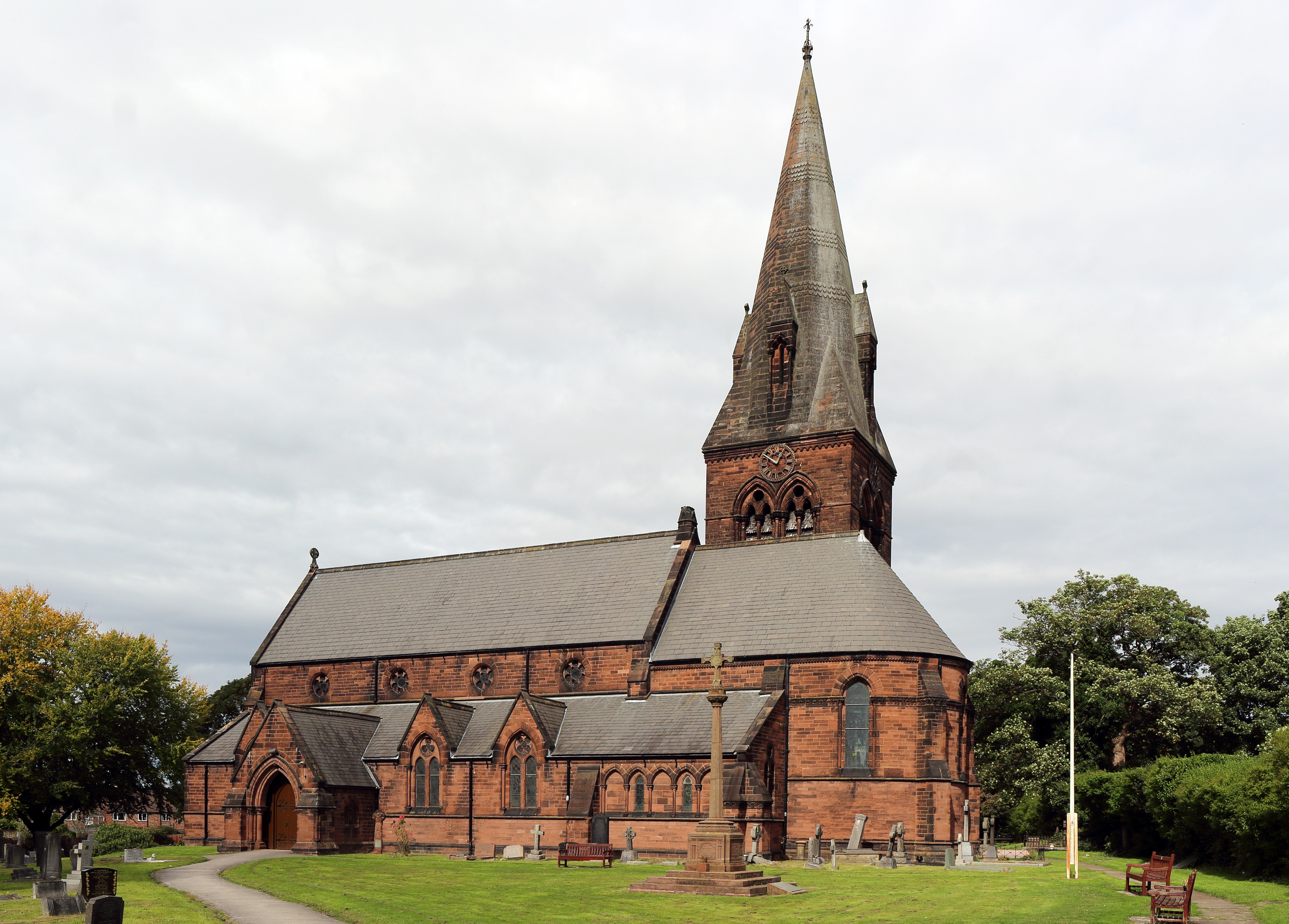
St Barnabas' Church, Bromborough, Merseyside (1862–64)

== See also ==
- List of works by George Gilbert Scott

== Sources ==
- Bayley, Stephen (1983). The Albert Memorial (paperback ed.). London: Scolar Press.
- Cherry, Bridget; Pevsner, Nikolaus (1983). London 2: South. The Buildings of England. Penguin Books. ISBN 978-0-300-09651-4.
- Cole, David (1980). The Work of Gilbert Scott. London: Architectural Press. ISBN 0-85139-723-9.
- Eastlake, Charles Locke (1872). A History of the Gothic Revival. London: Longmans, Green & Co.
- Hitchcock, Henry-Russell (1977). Architecture:Nineteenth and Twentieth Centuries. The Pelican History of Art. Harmonsworth: Penguin Books.
- Pevsner, Nikolaus (1963). Herefordshire. The Buildings of England. Harmondsworth: Penguin Books. ISBN 0-14-071025-6.
- Pevsner, Nikolaus (1968). Worcestershire. The Buildings of England. Harmondsworth: Penguin Books.
- Sherwood, Jennifer; Pevsner, Nikolaus (1974). Oxfordshire. The Buildings of England. Harmondsworth: Penguin Books. ISBN 0-14-071045-0.
