= Harrowby =

Harrowby may refer to:

- Earl of Harrowby, in the County of Lincoln, is a title in the Peerage of the United Kingdom
  - Nathaniel Ryder, 1st Baron Harrowby (1735–1803)
  - Dudley Ryder, 1st Earl of Harrowby, PC, FSA (1762–1847)
  - Dudley Ryder, 2nd Earl of Harrowby KG, PC, FRS (1798–1882)
  - Dudley Ryder, 3rd Earl of Harrowby PC, DL, JP (1831–1900)
  - Henry Ryder, 4th Earl of Harrowby (1836–1900)
  - John Ryder, 5th Earl of Harrowby (1864–1956)
  - Dudley Ryder, 6th Earl of Harrowby (1892–1987)
  - Dudley Ryder, 7th Earl of Harrowby (1922–2007)
  - Dudley Ryder, 8th Earl of Harrowby (born 1951)
- Harrowby Hall in Lincolnshire, England, was the family home of the Ryder family, the former home of Nathaniel Ryder
- Harrowby, Lincolnshire, England, a hamlet
