= Dudley Ryder =

Dudley Ryder may refer to:

- Dudley Ryder, 1st Earl of Harrowby (1762–1847), British politician
- Dudley Ryder, 2nd Earl of Harrowby (1798–1882), British politician
- Dudley Ryder, 3rd Earl of Harrowby (1831–1900), British peer and politician
- Dudley Ryder, 6th Earl of Harrowby (1892–1987), British peer and Conservative Member of Parliament
- Dudley Ryder, 7th Earl of Harrowby (1922–2007), British banker
- Dudley Ryder, 8th Earl of Harrowby (born 1951), British peer
- Dudley Ryder (judge) (1691–1756), British Lord Chief Justice
