= Earl of Harrowby =

Title in the Peerage of the United Kingdom

Earldom of Harrowby
- Arms: Quarterly: 1st & 4th, Azure, three Crescents Or, on each an Ermine Spot Sable (Ryder); 2nd & 3rd, Gules, three Lapwings Or, within a Bordure Argent (Terrick). Crest: Out of a Mural Crown Or, a Dragon's Head Argent, charged on the neck with an Ermone Spot Sable. Supporters: On either side a Griffin, wings elevated Argent, charged on the shoulder with three Crescents Or, chained Or.
- Creation date: 19 July 1809
- Created by: King George III
- Peerage: Peerage of the United Kingdom
- First holder: Dudley Ryder, 1st Earl of Harrowby
- Present holder: Dudley Ryder, 8th Earl of Harrowby
- Heir apparent: Dudley Ryder, Viscount Sandon
- Remainder to: The 1st Earl's heirs male of the body lawfully begotten
- Subsidiary titles: Viscount Sandon; Baron Harrowby
- Status: Extant
- Seats: Sandon Hall; Burnt Norton
- Motto: SERVATA FIDES CINERI (Faith kept with my ancestor)

Earl of Harrowby, in the County of Lincoln, is a title in the Peerage of the United Kingdom. It was created in 1809 for the prominent politician and former Foreign Secretary, Dudley Ryder, 2nd Baron Harrowby. He was made Viscount Sandon, of Sandon in the County of Stafford, at the same time, which title is used as a courtesy title by the heir apparent to the earldom. His son, the second Earl, held office under Lord Palmerston as Chancellor of the Duchy of Lancaster and Lord Privy Seal. He was succeeded by his eldest son, the third Earl. He was a Conservative politician and notably served as President of the Board of Trade from 1878 to 1880.

His nephew, the fifth Earl (who succeeded his father in 1900), briefly represented Gravesend in the House of Commons as a Conservative and was also Lord Lieutenant of Staffordshire. His son, the sixth Earl, sat as Conservative Member of Parliament for Shrewsbury. As of 2017 the titles are held by the latter's grandson, the eighth Earl, who succeeded his father in 2007.

The family seats are Sandon Hall, near Sandon, Staffordshire and Burnt Norton House, near Chipping Camden, Gloucestershire.

== History ==
The title of Baron Harrowby, of Harrowby in the County of Lincoln, was created in the Peerage of Great Britain in 1776 for Nathaniel Ryder, who had previously represented Tiverton in Parliament. He was the son of Sir Dudley Ryder, Lord Chief Justice of the King's Bench from 1754 to 1756. Dudley Ryder was offered a peerage by King George II on 24 May 1756, but died the following day, before the patent was completed. Lord Harrowby was succeeded by his son, the aforementioned second Baron, who was created Earl of Harrowby in 1809. The Ryders derive their name and their coat-of-arms from the Ryther family of Ryther, Yorkshire.

Several other members of the Ryder family may also be mentioned. The Hon. Richard Ryder, second son of the first Baron Harrowby, was Home Secretary between 1809 and 1812. The Right Reverend the Hon. Henry Ryder, youngest son of the first Baron, was Bishop of Gloucester from 1815 to 1824 and Bishop of Lichfield from 1824 to 1836. His second son George Dudley Ryder was the father of 1) the Very Reverend Henry Ignatius Dudley Ryder (1837–1907), and 2) Sir George Lisle Ryder, KCB (1838–1905). Henry Ryder's fifth son Sir Alfred Phillips Ryder was an Admiral of the Fleet. Charles Henry Dudley Ryder (1868–1945), third son of Lieutenant-Colonel Spencer Charles Dudley Ryder (1825–1873), sixth son of Henry Ryder, was a Colonel in the Royal Engineers. His third son Robert Ryder was a sailor and Conservative politician. The Hon. Granville Ryder, second son of the first Earl, sat as Member of Parliament for Tiverton and Hertfordshire. His eldest son Dudley Henry Ryder is the great-grandfather of the psychologist and animal welfare campaigner Richard D. Ryder. Granville Ryder's second son and namesake Granville Ryder was Member of Parliament for Salisbury.

The family seat is Sandon Hall, near Stafford, Staffordshire. The family also resides at Burnt Norton house, a house made famous by the T. S. Eliot poem Burnt Norton as is found in the Four Quartets.

== Barons Harrowby (1776) ==
- Nathaniel Ryder, 1st Baron Harrowby (1735–1803)
- Dudley Ryder, 2nd Baron Harrowby (1762–1847) (created Earl of Harrowby in 1809)

== Earls of Harrowby (1809) ==
- Dudley Ryder, 1st Earl of Harrowby (1762–1847)
- Dudley Ryder, 2nd Earl of Harrowby (1798–1882)
- Dudley Francis Stuart Ryder, 3rd Earl of Harrowby (1831–1900)
- Henry Dudley Ryder, 4th Earl of Harrowby (1836–1900)
- John Herbert Dudley Ryder, 5th Earl of Harrowby (1864–1956)
- Dudley Ryder, 6th Earl of Harrowby (1892–1987)
- Dudley Danvers Granville Coutts Ryder, 7th Earl of Harrowby (1922–2007)
- Dudley Adrian Conroy Ryder, 8th Earl of Harrowby (b. 1951)
