= Duntze =

Duntze is a surname. Notable people with the surname include:

- Duntze baronets
- Sir John Duntze, 1st Baronet (c. 1735–1795), English merchant, banker, and politician
