= Londonthorpe =

Village in Lincolnshire, England

Coordinates: 52.92°N 0.58°W

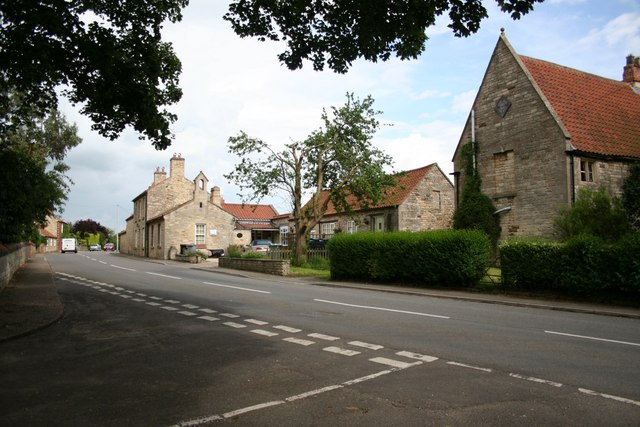
- High Road, Londonthorpe

- Location within Lincolnshire
- OS grid reference: SK953379
  - London: 110 mi (180 km) S
- Civil parish: Londonthorpe and Harrowby Without
- District: South Kesteven
- Shire county: Lincolnshire
- Region: East Midlands
- Country: England
- Sovereign state: United Kingdom
- Post town: Grantham
- Postcode district: NG31
- Police: Lincolnshire
- Fire: Lincolnshire
- Ambulance: East Midlands
- UK Parliament: Grantham and Bourne

Londonthorpe is a village in the civil parish of Londonthorpe and Harrowby Without, in South Kesteven district of Lincolnshire, England. It lies 3 miles (5 km) to the north-east from Grantham, 1 mile (1.6 km) to the west from the B6403 (Ermine Street Roman road), and borders Belton Park in the west.

In 1921 the parish had a population of 183. On 1 April 1931 the parish was abolished to form "Londonthorpe and Harrowby Without".

According to A Dictionary of British Place Names 'Londonthorpe' derives from the Old Scandinavian lundr+thorp, meaning an "outlying farmstead or hamlet by a grove." In the Domesday account the village is written as "Lundertorp."

The enlarged parish includes the Grade II listed Harrowby Hall, formerly the family home of the Ryder family. Londonthorpe was an estate village of the Belton Estate. The village listed buildings include The Grange farm house, the Manor House, and various other houses and cottages. Listed buildings within the larger Londonthorpe and Harrowby parish include the Officer's Mess of the Second World War RAF Spitalgate, and buildings and structures within Belton Park.

The Grade II* listed parish church is dedicated to St John Baptist, the tower of which dates to the early 13th century and parts of the rood screen to the 15th. The church was rebuilt with a new roof in 1850, with considerable further restoration taking place in 1879. The churchyard contains the war graves of 32 Commonwealth armed service personnel of the First World War, at which time an army training camp existed at Belton Park to the west.

Earthworks, presumed to be remains of a garden terrace. lie to the west of the church.

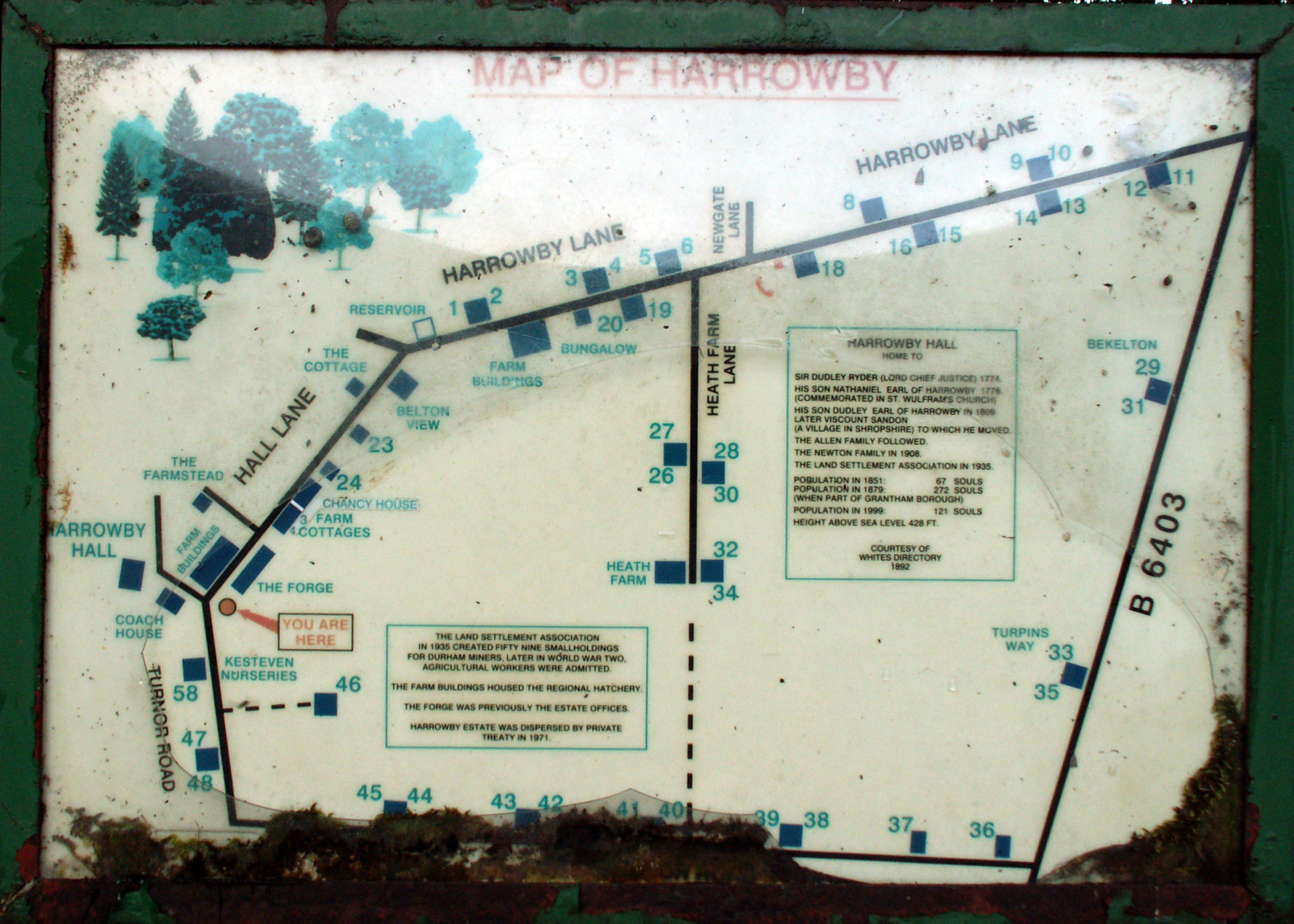
Land Settlement map

Londonthorpe Wood, created in 1993 by the Woodland Trust, and Alma Park Wood are within the parish 1 mile (1.6 km) to the west. The parish also includes Prince William of Gloucester Barracks (previously RAF Spitalgate) and parts of eastern Grantham, particularly Alma Park Industrial Estate.

During the 1930s the parish was a centre for the Land Settlement Association scheme, a social experiment where unemployed Durham and South Wales miners were offered specially built cottages with smallholdings of land and livestock, to encourage self-sufficiency.
