= Emily Hale =

American teacher and muse of TS Eliot (1891–1969)

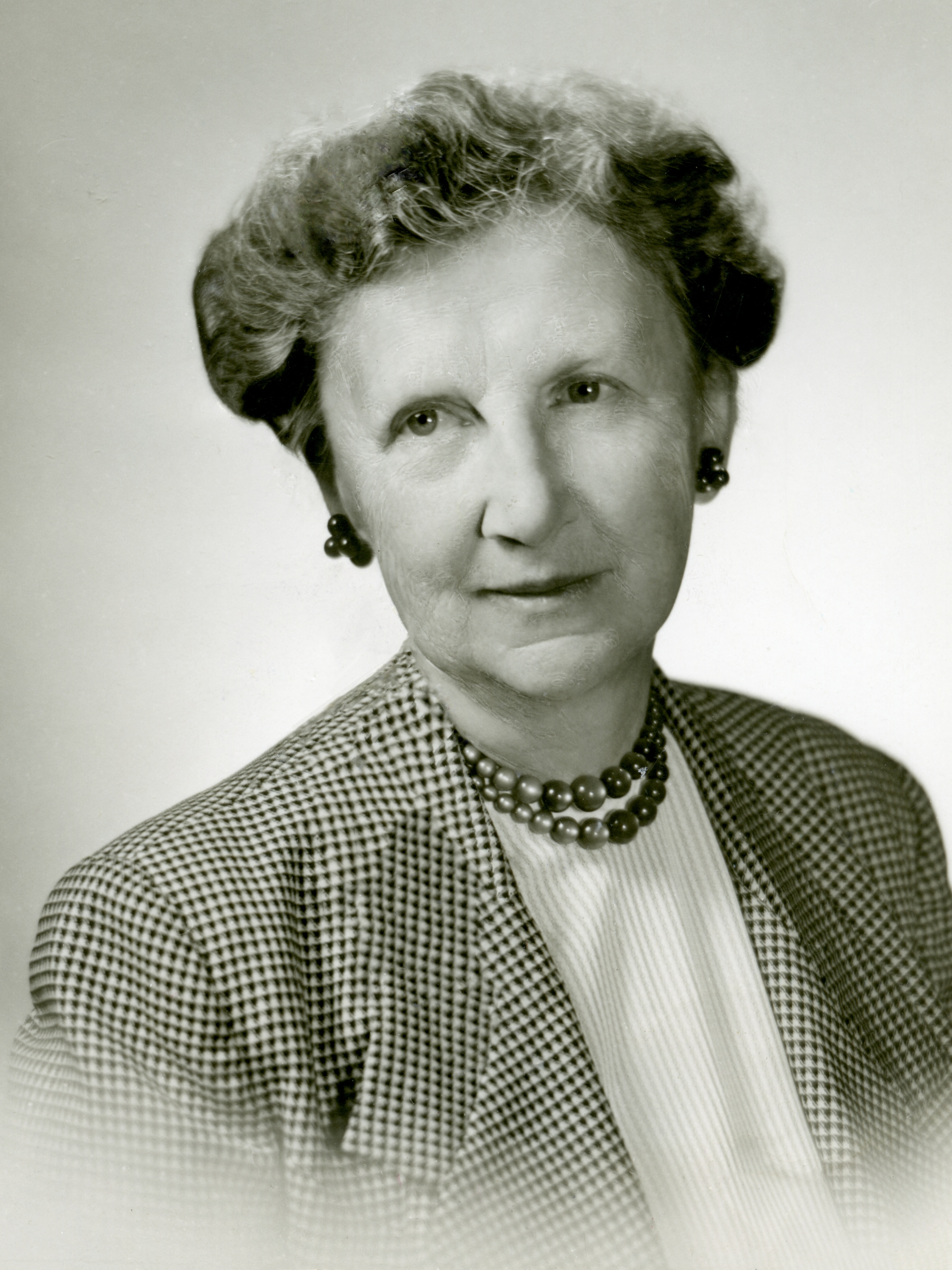
- Hale in 1956
- Born: October 27, 1891; East Orange, New Jersey, U.S.
- Died: October 12, 1969 (aged 77); Concord, Massachusetts, U.S.
- Occupations: Speech and drama teacher
- Known for: Muse of T. S. Eliot

Emily Hale (October 27, 1891 – October 12, 1969) was an American speech and drama teacher, who was the longtime muse and confidante of the poet T. S. Eliot. There were 1,131 letters from Eliot to Hale deposited in Princeton University Library in 1956; they were made accessible to the public on January 2, 2020.

== Early life and career ==
Hale was born in East Orange, New Jersey, on October 27, 1891. Her father was Edward Hale, an architect who became a Unitarian minister and taught at Harvard Divinity School. Her mother Emily (née Milliken) had become a "permanent mental invalid" after the death of her infant son. Hale lived at home with her father in Chestnut Hill, outside of Boston, until he died when she was 26. Reverend John Carroll Perkins and his wife also served as her guardians. The Perkinses later moved from Seattle to Boston, and Hale frequently traveled with them to Europe. The three of them spent many summers in Chipping Campden, England, in the 1930s, and hosted Eliot while they vacationed there.

Hale graduated from Miss Porter's School, but never attended college. After her father died in 1918, she took a job as a dorm matron at Simmons University (then College), where she had helped organize the drama club as a volunteer in 1916. She later was promoted to speech instructor at Simmons. She went on to serve as a speech and drama teacher at Milwaukee-Downer College (1921–1929) (now part of Lawrence University), Scripps College (1932–1934), and Smith College (1936–1942), as well as the all-girls Concord Academy and Abbot Academy preparatory schools.

Hale was an active member of the Unitarian Church and also the League of Women Voters, and she was a volunteer at the Sophia Smith Collection.

== Relationship with Eliot ==
Eliot recalled first falling in love with Hale in 1912 when he was a graduate student studying philosophy at Harvard, and Eliot declared his love for her shortly before leaving for Europe in 1914; Eliot later said that Hale did not reciprocate his feelings, but he continued to write her and to send her flowers for her theatrical performances after he left. However, in June 1915, Eliot married Vivienne Haigh-Wood, and his preserved correspondence with Hale did not materially resume until 1930. From 1930 until 1956, Eliot wrote more than a thousand letters to Hale, visiting her in California over the New Year's holidays in 1932–33, before deciding to seek a formal separation from his wife when he returned to England in 1933. However, he told Hale he could not seek a divorce because of the strictures of his Anglican faith.

Hale and Eliot spent the summers from 1935 to 1939 together in Campden, Gloucestershire, as the guests of her aunt and uncle, the Perkinses. In 1935, Hale and Eliot visited Burnt Norton, an abandoned manor house in Gloucestershire. (Eliot biographers had believed this visit occurred in 1934, but the Eliot-Hale correspondence revealed that the visit occurred in 1935.) In the narrative Hale wrote concerning her relationship with Eliot, released by Princeton University Library in mid-January 2020 alongside the collection of Eliot's correspondence to her, Hale said that Eliot had told her that "Burnt Norton" was his love poem to her, an assertion backed up in the Eliot letters themselves.

World War II intervened, and Hale and Eliot would not meet again until 1946, by which time Eliot was about to turn 58 and Hale, 55; however, after the death of Vivienne in 1947, Eliot arranged a meeting with Hale at which he told her he no longer could marry her. Eliot had told Hale that he would marry her if he could, so she was shocked and saddened when he changed his mind. After 1947, they continued to be friends, but their letters and visits were less frequent.

Eliot's relationship with Hale was said by some biographers to provide Eliot with a model of a silent, ethereal woman and chaste love that could be indefinitely sustained. Hale's own feelings for Eliot are largely unknown, partly because Eliot arranged for nearly all of her letters to be burned after he married his much younger secretary, Esmé Valerie Fletcher, in 1957. Eliot's last letter to Hale in the Princeton collection was written in 1957.

== Life after Eliot ==
In 1957, after Eliot remarried, Hale was forced to retire from Abbot Academy because she had reached the school's mandatory retirement age. While some Eliot biographers wrote that Hale was hospitalized following a nervous breakdown, no evidence is cited.

One of Hale's biographers, Sara Fitzgerald, said "Emily Hale is painted as someone who fell apart, who had a nervous breakdown after loving Eliot for so many years and seeing him marry another woman", but "I didn't necessarily find that to be the case. I felt she got over this blow and kept living."

After her retirement, Hale acted in a number of well-received community theater productions, and kept in contact with her friends and past students.

She also taught for a period at Oak Grove School in Vassalboro, Maine, and finally died in Concord, Massachusetts.

Fitzgerald records that Hale wrote a final letter to Eliot in the early 1960s, in which she told him it was "'difficult' for her to consider her life to be important just because they had been connected," though the letter "ended on an upbeat note, hoping that they could still be friends." Eliot never responded, and he died soon after in 1965.

== Letter archive ==
Hale was a friend of the Princeton University English professor, Willard Thorp, and his wife Margaret Farrand Thorp. From 1942, she explored with Thorp the idea of keeping Eliot's letters in the Princeton University Library for safekeeping, finally deciding to do this in July 1956. Hale specified that the letters should be kept closed for fifty full years after the latter of her or Eliot's death. Hale died after Eliot, on October 12, 1969, in Concord, and accordingly, the archive was opened to scholars only in January 2020, revealing 1,131 letters from Eliot to Hale dating from the period 1930 to 1957. The letters included information about the evolving relationship between Hale and Eliot, and in some cases contradicted established published sources.

Initially, the letters could only be read in person at Princeton Library, and copies could not be made. Access to the letters became even more restricted following COVID-19-related shutdowns. On January 30, 2023, the Eliot estate made all the letters, and additional materials from the Eliot archive, available to the public for free, online.

The number of letters, by year, are as follows:

- 1930 (7 letters)
- 1931 (92)
- 1932 (100)
- 1933 (64)
- 1934 (64)
- 1935 (91)
- 1936 (76)
- 1937 (63)
- 1938 (59)
- 1939 (78)
- 1940 (53)
- 1941 (35)
- 1942 (35)
- 1943 (37)
- 1944 (40)
- 1945 (30)
- 1946 (27)
- 1947 (34)
- 1948 (25)
- 1949 (15)
- 1950 (17)
- 1951 (20)
- 1952 (15)
- 1953 (12)
- 1954 (14)
- 1955 (14)
- 1956 (14)

Hale included a cover note with the letters saying, "The memory of the years when we were most together and so happy are mine always", and also, "I accepted conditions as they were offered under the unnatural code which surrounded us, so that perhaps more sophisticated persons than I will not be surprised to learn the truth about us".

=== Posthumous statement ===
In a surprise to scholars, Eliot's estate simultaneously issued a written statement by him to be opened on the release of Hale's letters. Eliot's statement said that he "never had any sexual relations with Emily Hale," and it appeared to reject the notion that Hale was his muse: "Emily Hale would have killed the poet in me; Vivienne nearly was the death of me, but she kept the poet alive".

However, some commentators immediately contrasted Eliot's statement with some of the early releases of his letters which state, "You have made me perfectly happy: that is, happier than I have ever been in my life", and they speculated that Eliot's harsh statement might have been written at the instigation of his second wife, Valerie Eliot. Others believe it may have been a reaction to his unhappiness with Hale's decision to archive his letters for future release.

After an initial review of the letters, Eliot scholar Frances Dickey told The Washington Post that "he basically confesses his love for Emily Hale and tells her that she's the great love of his life", and "that he's been writing for her all of these years, and he even names the places in his poetry where he has paid tribute to her or honored her in some way".

Eliot biographer Lyndall Gordon told PBS News that the contents of the letters far exceeded Dickey and Gordon's expectations. "Eliot was very emotional and very explicit about how much he loved her and how important she was to his work". Gordon also added, "Eliot lays it all bare. That's striking, in part, because for a long time, it was 'unfashionable' to think of Eliot as a confessional poet". She highlighted passages of works that Eliot told Hale she had inspired, including The Waste Land.

== See also ==
- The Archivist, a fictional book (1998) by Martha Cooley, based on the archived Eliot letters
- A New England Affair, a novel (2017) by Steven Carroll inspired by the relationship between Emily Hale and T.S. Eliot
- List of sealed archives

== Literature ==
- Lyndall Gordon: The hyacinth girl : T. S. Eliot's hidden muse, London : Virago, 2022, ISBN 978-0-349-01211-7
