= Low Fulney =

Hamlet in the South Holland district of Lincolnshire, England

Coordinates: 52.778985°N 0.12187°E

- Location within Lincolnshire
- OS grid reference: TF267218
  - London: 85 mi (137 km) S
- District: South Holland
- Shire county: Lincolnshire
- Region: East Midlands
- Country: England
- Sovereign state: United Kingdom
- Post town: SPALDING
- Postcode district: PE12
- Dialling code: 01775
- Police: Lincolnshire
- Fire: Lincolnshire
- Ambulance: East Midlands
- UK Parliament: South Holland and The Deepings

Low Fulney is a hamlet in the South Holland district of Lincolnshire, England. It is in the Spalding St. Paul's ward of the South Holland District Council. It is situated 1.5 miles (2.4 km) east from the town of Spalding,

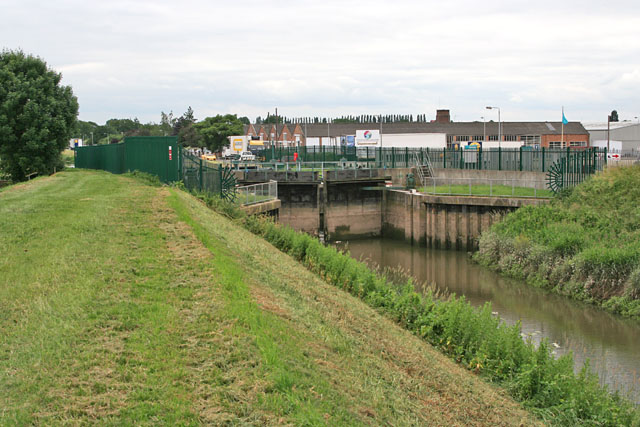
Fulney Lock, Spalding

Thornholme Grange, a house of 15th-century origin, was built of brick on the supposed site of Spalding Priory dairy. It was extended and partially rebuilt in the 16th century. It was altered in the 19th century, and again when acquired by the Land Settlement Association. The association was established in 1936, made up of 38 tenanted smallholdings for unemployed miners from the north-east, at the time of the Jarrow March.

== See also ==
- Fulney
