= Fen Drayton =

Village in Cambridgeshire, England

Coordinates: 52.2963°N 0.0381°W

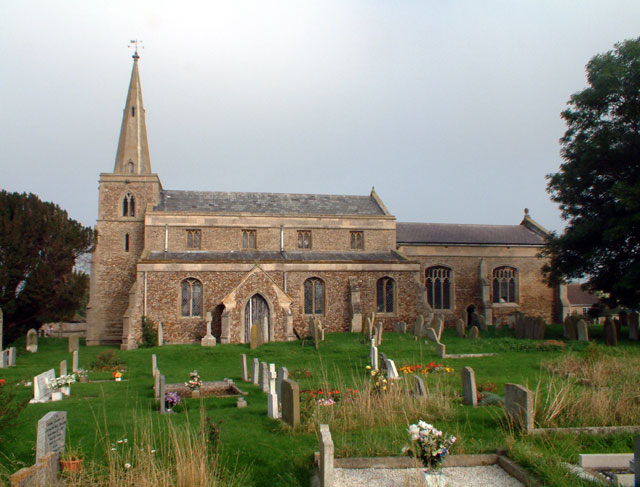
- St Mary's church

- Location within Cambridgeshire
- Population: 856 (2011 Census)
- OS grid reference: TL335683
- District: South Cambridgeshire
- Shire county: Cambridgeshire
- Region: East
- Country: England
- Sovereign state: United Kingdom
- Post town: CAMBRIDGE
- Postcode district: CB24
- Dialling code: 01954

Fen Drayton is a small village between Cambridge and St. Ives in Cambridgeshire, England, and between the villages of Fenstanton and Swavesey.

According to the 2001 census, it is home to 827 people, living in some 329 dwellings. The population was nearly entirely white (99.3%), with 0.4% Asian/Asian British, and 0.4% of mixed ethnicity. 71.5% of the population were Christian, compared to 1.1% listed under 'other religion' (27.4% claimed 'no religion' or did not state a religion). The population of the civil parish as of the 2011 census is 856

== Amenities ==
The village has a primary school, village hall, nursery, tennis courts and football fields, where Drayton Lions Football Club play their home matches, and a pub (The Three Tuns). The Anglican parish church is dedicated to St Mary the Virgin and is a Grade II* listed building.

The village is close to the A14 and the Cambridgeshire Guided Busway, and is on National Cycle Route 51.

Much of the working population commutes to work in one of the larger towns or cities nearby; however, there are also a number of farms in the village, some still active. The village was one of 20 Land Settlement Association sites established in the 1930s to provide small holdings (around 5 acres of land each) for the growing of salad crops. When the scheme was wound up in 1983, Fen Drayton Growers was established as a co-operative to manage sales from the remaining growers. This was wound up in the 1990s, and most former holdings in the village are no longer productive sites.

== Nature reserve ==
Just north of the village is the Fen Drayton Nature Reserve, a 108-hectare (267-acre) reserve comprising four lakes formed from exhausted sand and gravel pits. These were worked since the 1950s, by ARC (now Hanson plc), and is now a habitat for some 190 bird species, along with other associated wildlife. In particular, gadwall, wigeon, pintail, goldeneye, smew, coot and bittern populations may be seen: it is estimated that 2% of the UK's bittern population, and 4% of the UK's cold weather smew population, reside here, making it an important site. The RSPB purchased much of the site in 2007.

The reserve is accessible from the surrounding villages of Fen Drayton, Swavesey and Fenstanton. It is not accessible from nearby Holywell as Holywell is other side of the River Great Ouse and there is no bridge. However Holywell Ferry Road, leaving the village, is witness to a former link, together with The Ferryboat Inn in Holywell itself.

It is open every day (and all day), with no charge, and two car parks, rights of way (footpaths, bridleways and a byway) and hides around the lakes. In times of heavy rain and river flooding, the entire reserve goes under water, including car parks and most rights of way.

The Cambridgeshire Guided Busway passes through the reserve using part of the old Cambridge and Huntingdon railway and the busway was opposed at the planning stage for disturbing this reserve. The route for the guided busway was cleared of vegetation over the winter 2007–2008.

It is planned that the reserve will become part of a much larger wetland area along the River Great Ouse linking to the Hanson-RSPB Wetland Project at Needingworth Quarry that should become Britain's largest reedbed within the next 30 years. This will then connect to reserves at Ouse Washes and Welney north of Earith. The Ouse Washes are managed by the RSPB and Welney is run by the Wildfowl and Wetlands Trust.

In January 2013, following a prolonged period of local flooding, a seal was spotted and filmed in a ditch linked to the nearby Great Ouse, some 50 miles from the sea.

== Gallery ==
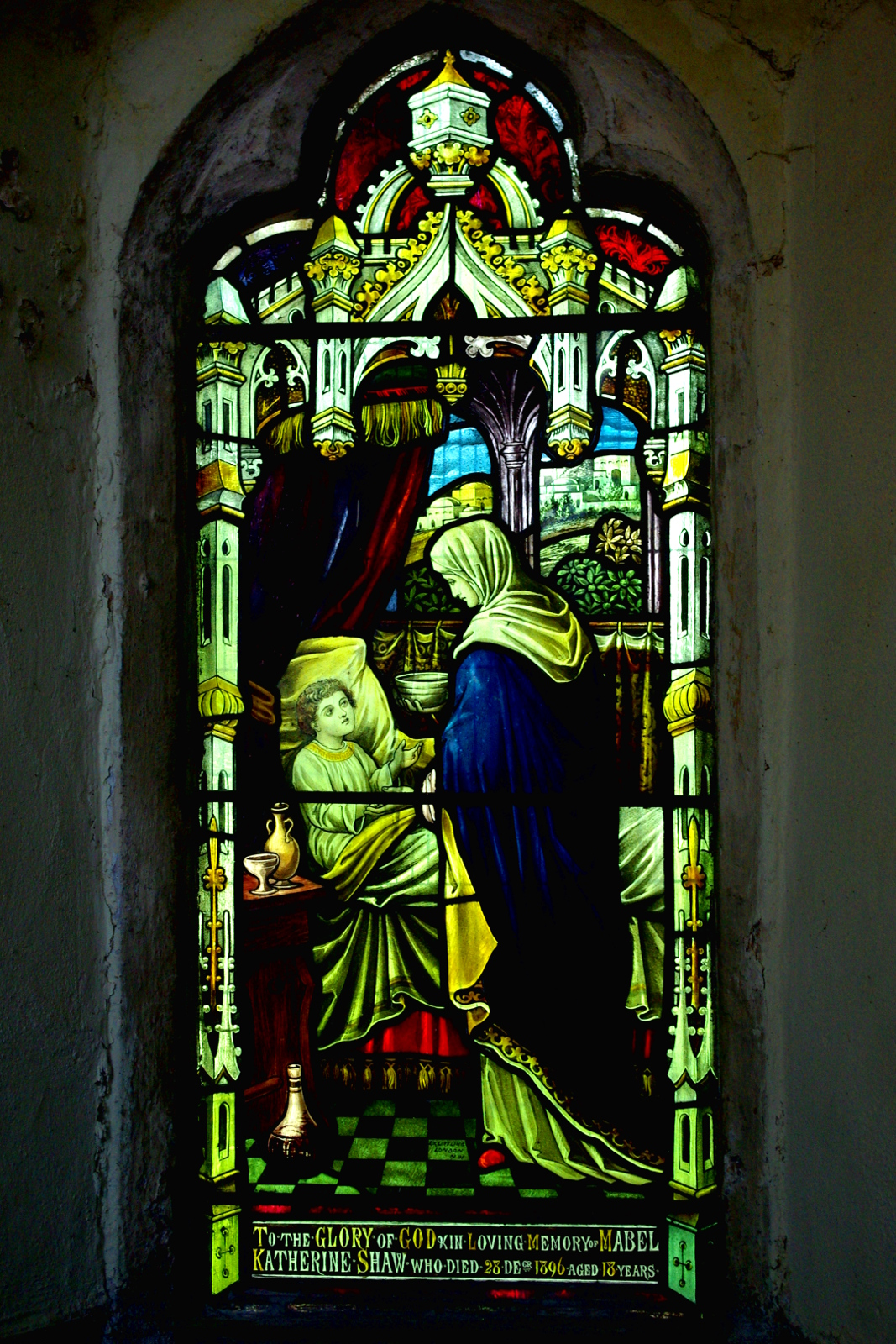
South chancel window, St Mary's church

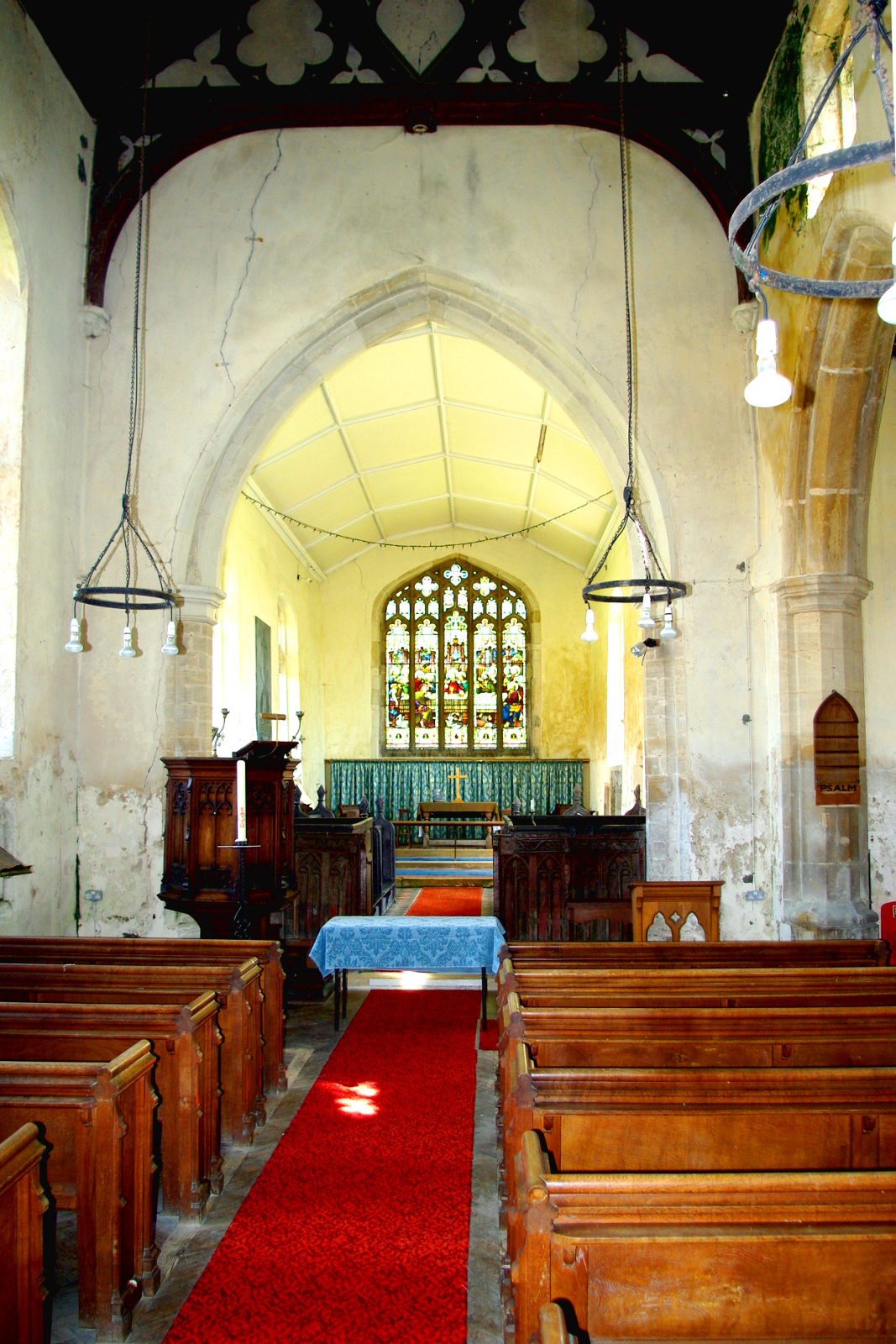
St Mary's church interior

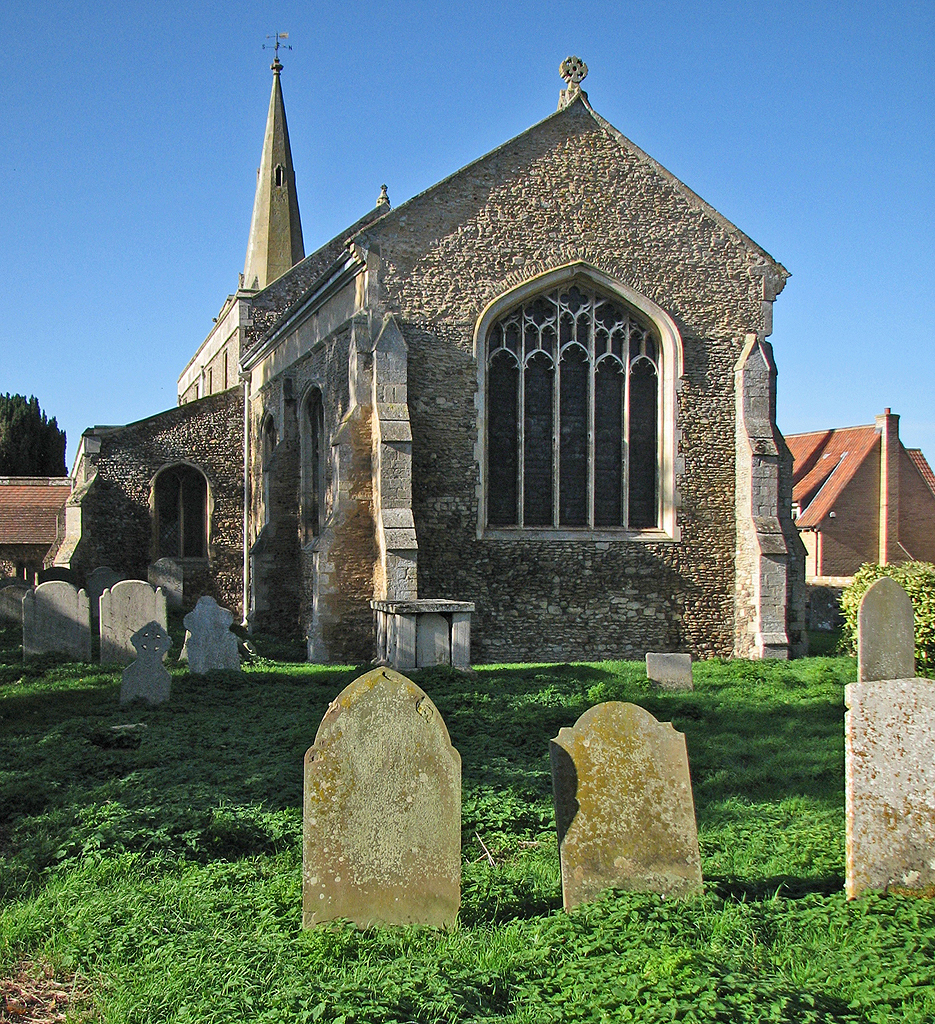
St Mary's church east end

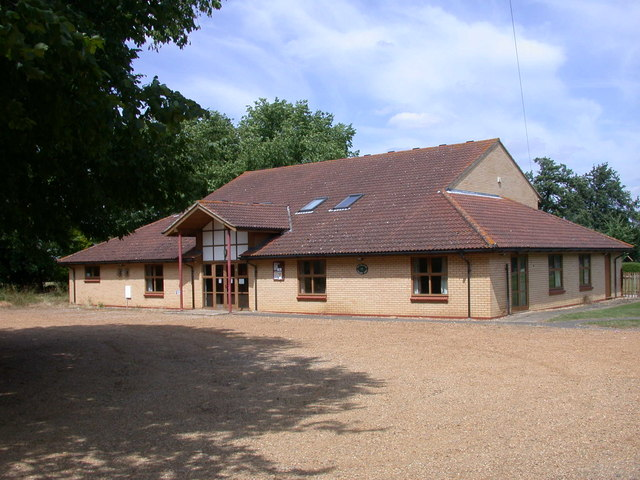
Village Hall

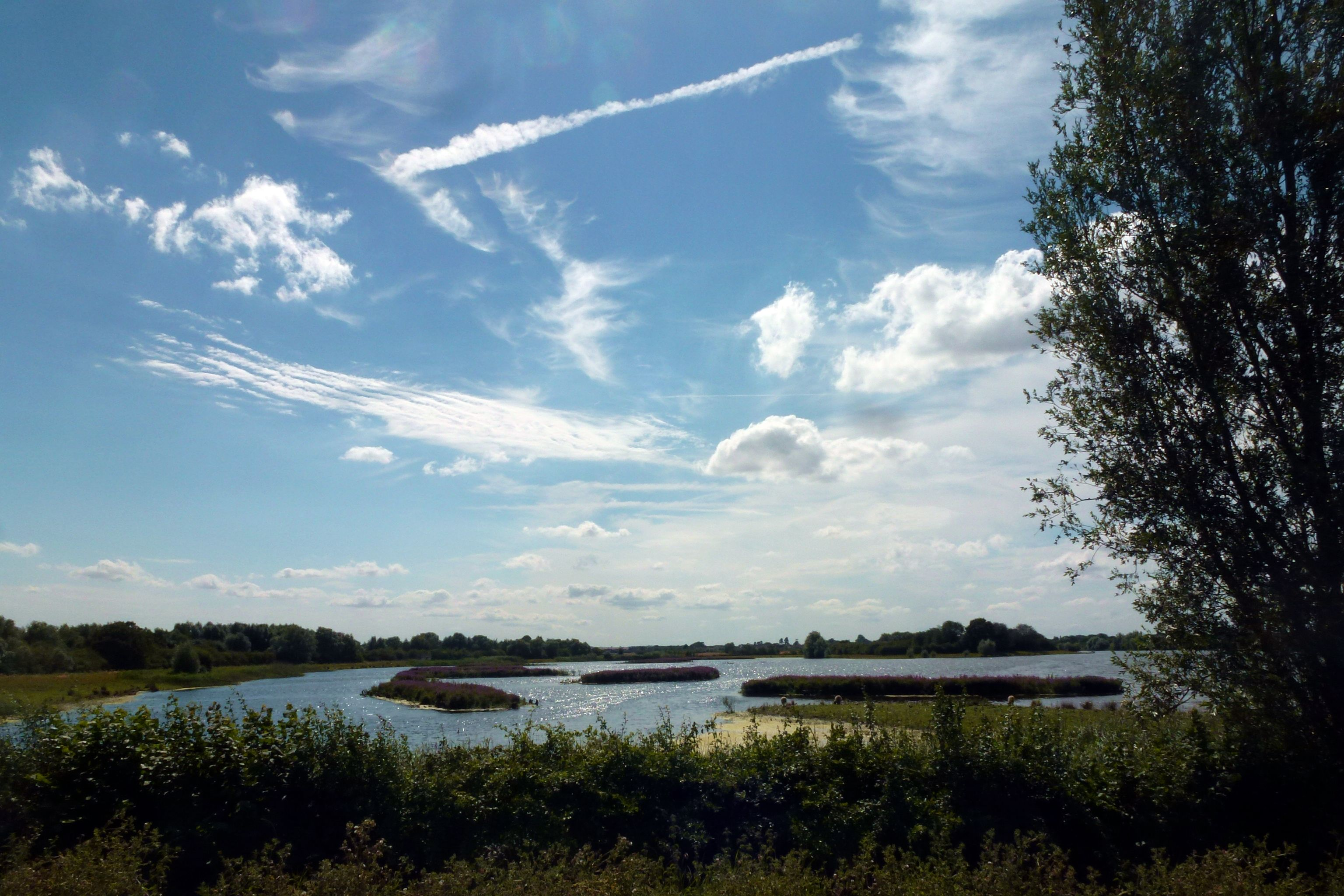
Moore Lake at the nature reserve, viewed from the guided busway

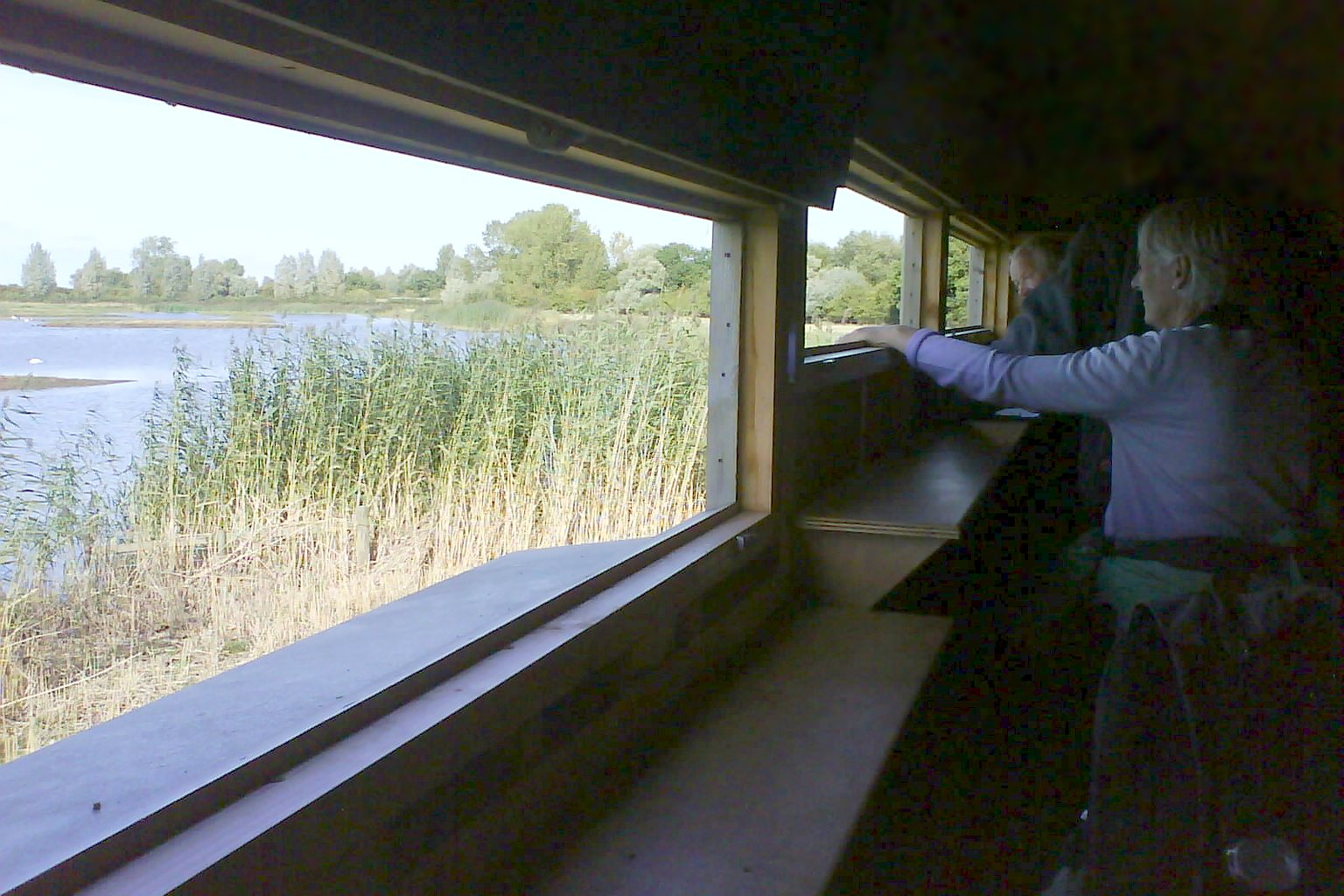
Moore Lake viewed from the bird hide

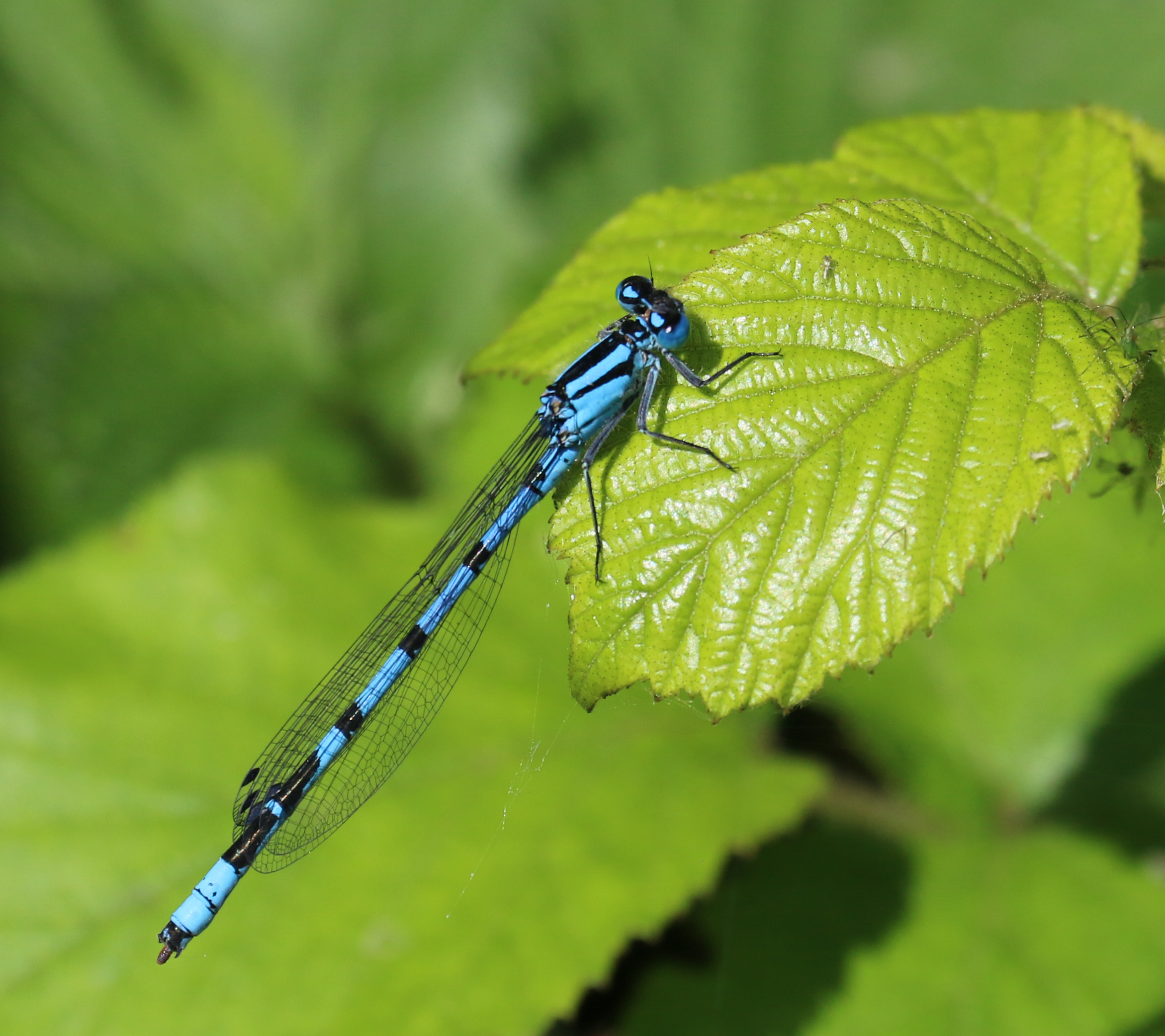
Common Blue Damselfly (Enallagma cyathigerum)

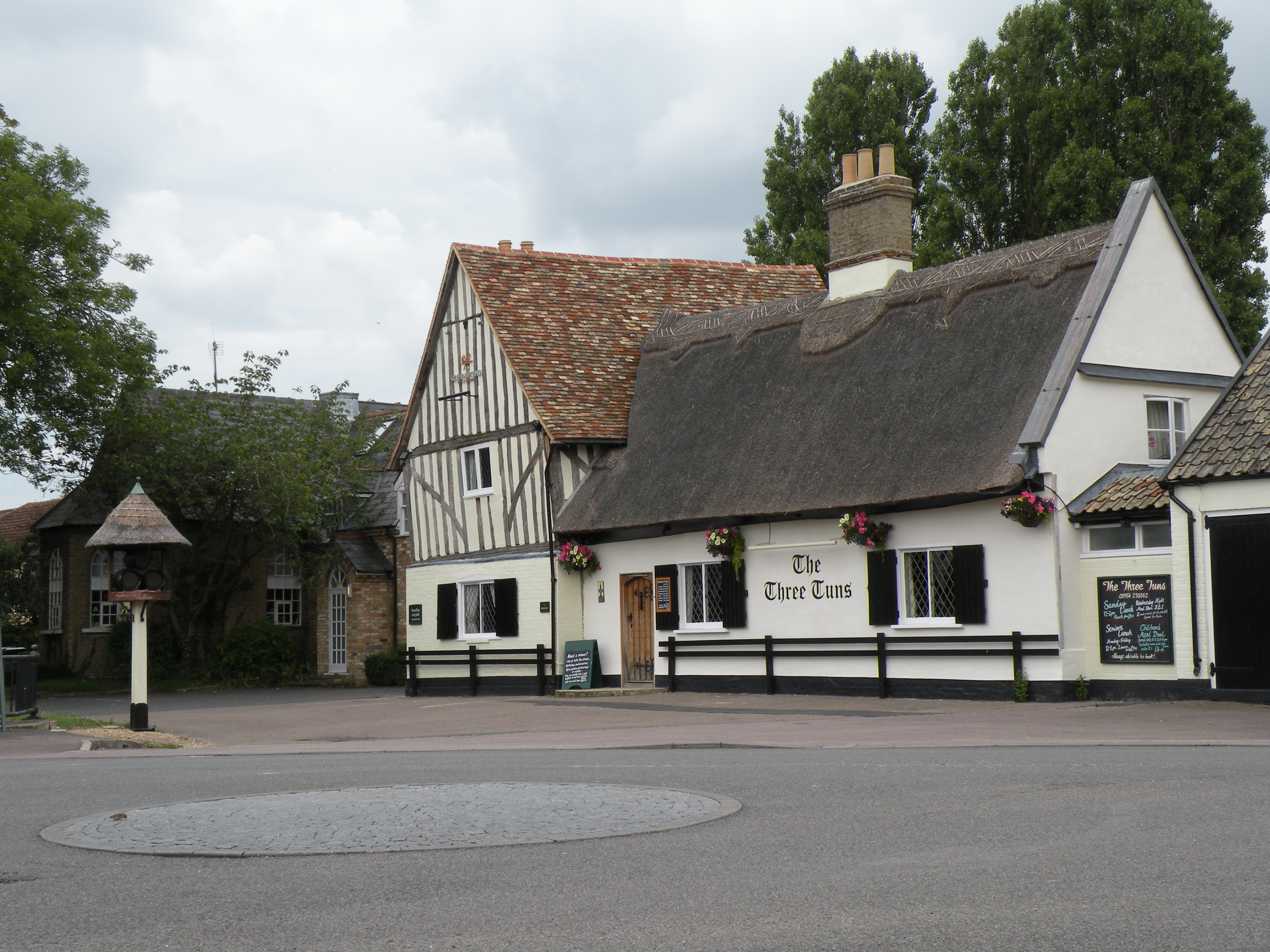
The Tree Tuns
