= Londonthorpe and Harrowby Without =

Civil parish in Lincolnshire, England

Coordinates: 52.9156°N 0.5916°W

Londonthorpe and Harrowby Without is a civil parish in the South Kesteven district of Lincolnshire, England. According to the 2001 Census it had a population of 4,344, in 1743 households, increasing to a population of 5,133 at the 2011 census. It includes the village of Londonthorpe and the hamlet of Harrowby, Lincolnshire.

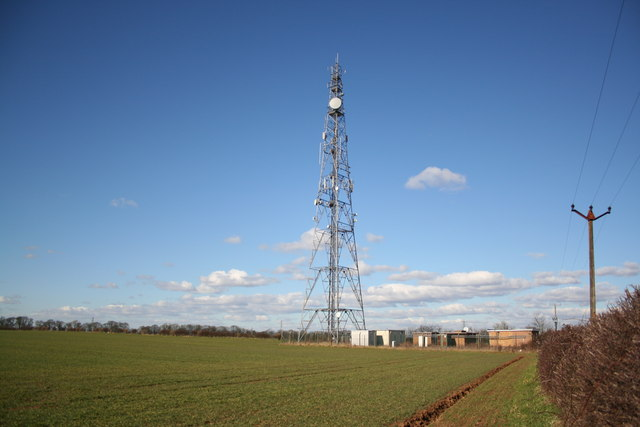
Radio mast on the cliff between Londonthorpe and Harrowby

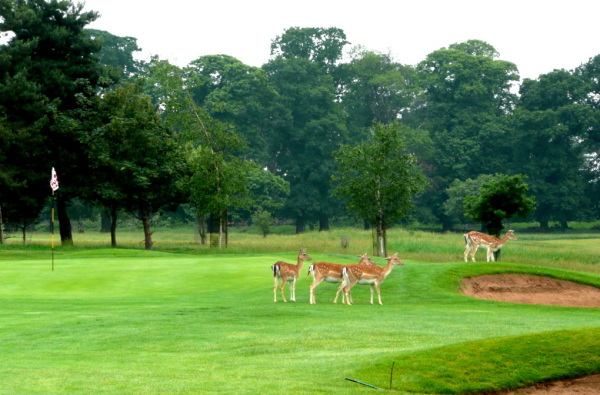
Deer on the golf course at Belton

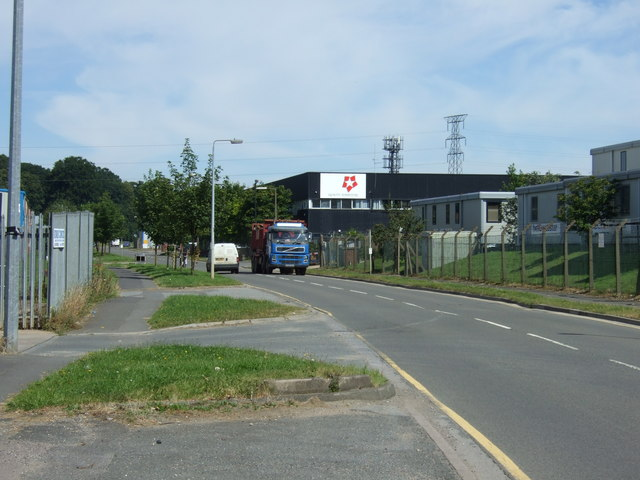
Alma Park

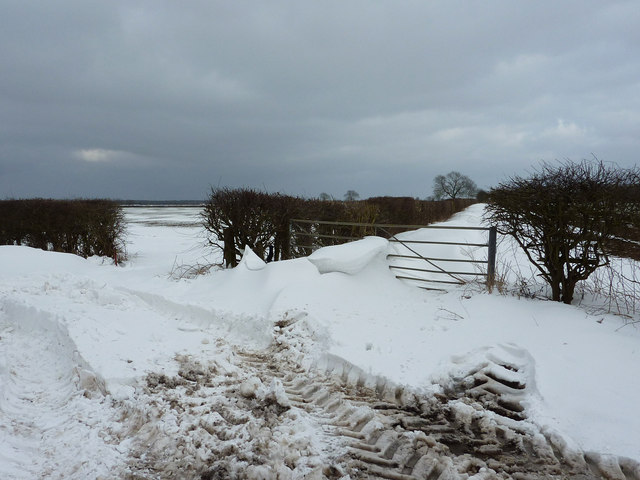
Snow on Whalebone Lane

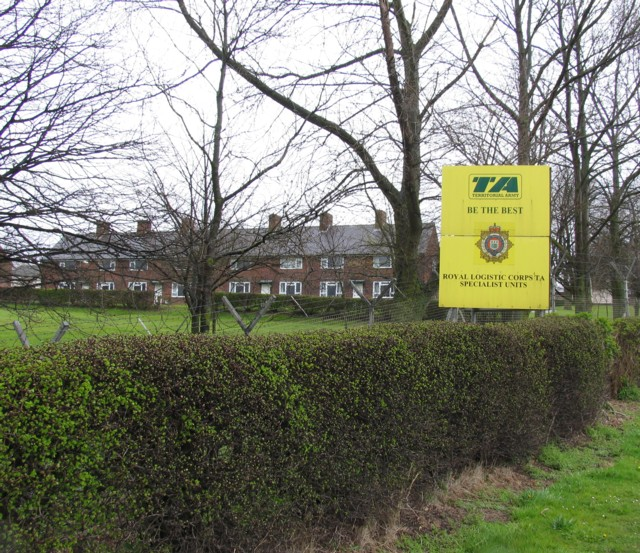
The TA barracks

Originally a township of Grantham, Harrowby was created a civil parish in 1866, and in 1894 it was split into two separate civil parishes, Harrowby Within, and Harrowby Without. In 1909 Harrowby Within was abolished and merged with the town of Grantham. In October 1930 Harrowby Without was reduced in size to enlarge the town, and in 1931 the parish was abolished and merged with Londonthorpe and Spittlegate Without to create Londonthorpe and Harrowby Without civil parish.

== Geography ==
The parish is bounded on the east by the High Dyke (Ermine Street), the modern B6403 road. The Southern boundary follows traditional field lines from SK945333 near Griffs Plantation westwards to cross the River Witham at SK926334 just north of Saltersford. The parish includes a small amount of land on the West bank of the Witham. The western boundary from here crosses the industrial works of Aveling Barford, and Somerby Hill, and encloses roughly half of Halls Hill (west of Harrowby Hall) (see SK929357). It then continues its winding progress north and west where it divides Harrowby Within from Harrowby Without (although modern building has negated the point of the separation) meeting the Witham again at SK922374 and following it until just south of Belton House at SK926391, and encloses a significant part of Belton Park and the golf course. The northern boundary crosses Belton Park just south of the ride called Bellmont Avenue, skirting south of the folly at Bellmont Tower, and then follows an estate road eastwards to close the border on the High Dyke just north of Pywipe Cottages at SK964386.

The parish boundary thus encloses the Prince William of Gloucester Barracks of the Territorial Army, once known as RAF Spitalgate, the former vehicle testing station at Cold Harbour, the Alma Park industrial Estate, the Mill and the Deer Park at Belton as well as the various farms and houses one would expect.

The parish is crossed east–west by the main A52 road and generally by several minor roads to the villages and to the Alma Park industrial estate.

Land in the parish is gently undulating, particularly around Belton Park and the south-eastern corner near Little Ponton. The area of Belton Park bordered by the Witham is around 50M altitude, and the land generally rises toward the east. Around the High Dyke it is flatter, and around 120M above sea level.

The bedrock of the Eastern Londonthorpe Parish and the High Dyke is Upper Lincolnshire limestone. To the west, on in Belton park and around Alma Park the ground is formed of mudstones, of the Whitby type, or the Charmouth formation further to the west. This western end of Belton Park, over the Charmouth mudstones, carries a superficial post-glacial deposit known as the Belton Sand and Gravel. The valley of the Witham includes its own alluvial deposits of clay, silt and gravel.
