= Burnt Norton (house) =

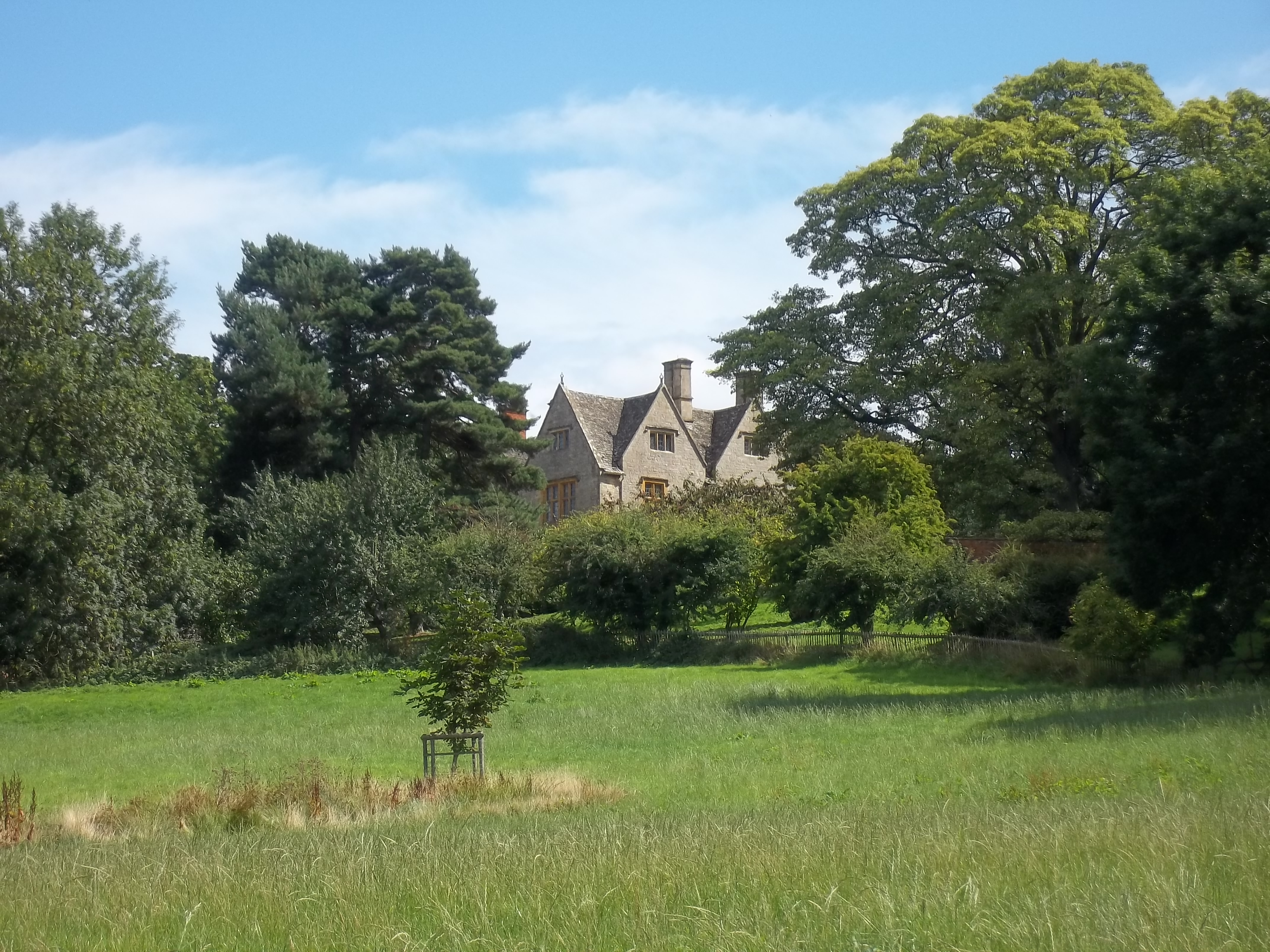
- Interactive map of the Burnt Norton area

General information
- Status: Restored
- Coordinates: 52.071678°N 1.788408°W

Design and construction
- Developer: Sir William Keyt, 3rd Baronet
- Known for: inspiring T.S. Eliot's Burnt Norton

Burnt Norton is a manor house in Aston-sub-Edge, near Chipping Campden, Gloucestershire, best known for being the inspiration for T. S. Eliot's poem of the same name.

== History ==
Sir William Keyt, 3rd Baronet, Member of Parliament for Warwick between 1722 and 1735, was married to the Hon. Anne née Tracy. Keyt left his wife in London while he went to live with her maid on his Cotswold estate, where he spent much of his fortune in extending and improving his mansion. He notably added two large side extensions to it after his mistress, upon viewing the house, asked "what is a kite without wings."

In time the mistress deserted him, and he began drinking heavily. One night in September 1741 he caused a fire which spread to the whole house. Unsuccessful attempts were made to rescue him and little was left of him to be buried at the church of Aston-sub-Edge. It was said he was deranged and set the fire deliberately. It was also proposed that he started the fire after a bout of heavy drinking.

In 1753 the property was bought by Sir Dudley Ryder, ancestor of the Earls of Harrowby, and has remained in the family ever since. The house was rebuilt and renamed Burnt Norton.

During the Second World War, Burnt Norton was occupied as a girls' boarding school by Tudor Hall school and, after the war, it was used as a school for boys from inner cities. In 1998, after lying empty for 30 years, Burnt Norton was restored as a family home.

== In popular culture ==
The estate became known as Burnt Norton and the garden remained as an attraction. It was after visiting the garden with his friend and suspected lover Emily Hale that T. S. Eliot wrote Burnt Norton, the first of his Four Quartets.

The story of Keyt and Norton House was the subject of a 2014 novel: Burnt Norton by Caroline Sandon, a pen-name of the present occupier, the Countess of Harrowby.
