= The Archivist =

1998 book by Martha Cooley

- Author: Martha Cooley
- Illustrator: Amy Goldfarb
- Language: English
- Publisher: Little, Brown and Company
- Publication date: 1998
- Publication place: United States
- Media type: Print (hardcover and paperback)
- Pages: 336 pp
- ISBN: 978-0316158466
- OCLC: 37694914
- Dewey Decimal: 813/.54
- LC Class: PS3553 .O5646 A87 1998

The Archivist is an American novel by Martha Cooley, first published in a hardcover format by Little, Brown and Company in 1998. The story makes extensive reference to the poetry of T. S. Eliot, and it dwells on themes such as guilt, insanity, and suicide. The book was reprinted in 1999 by Back Bay Books, an imprint of Little, Brown and Company.

== Plot ==
Matthias Lane is a widower in his sixties. He works as an archivist at an unnamed library and is told to preserve a set of letters that T. S. Eliot once wrote and sent to Emily Hale. Roberta Spire, a graduate student in her thirties, appeals to Matthias for a look at Eliot's letters.

Emily Hale donated T. S. Eliot's letters to the library and gave specific instructions that they were not to be shown to the public until 2020. Her decision to donate the letters at all, however, went against the wishes of T. S. Eliot himself, who wanted Hale to destroy the letters after she had read them.

Both Matthias and Roberta are highly familiar with T. S. Eliot's poetry, as well as Eliot's personal background. The novel briefly retells the story of how Eliot placed his first wife, Vivienne Eliot, in a mental institution, and how she eventually died. It is gradually revealed that Matthias, similarly, placed his wife Judith in a mental institution, and she eventually committed suicide. Judith's death occurred twenty years before Matthias first meets Roberta. Roberta reminds Matthias of Judith, because both women are of Jewish ancestry, both read and write poetry, and both have done research on the Holocaust.

When Judith was in the mental institution, Dr. Clay forbade her to read newspapers. Yet Judith's aunt and uncle, Len and Carol, smuggled newspapers into her room, so that Judith could keep up with the aftermath of the Holocaust. After Judith's suicide, Matthias assumes that the newspapers contributed to Judith's insanity. However, later, when Matthias speaks to Roberta about his wife, he admits that his attempts to cut his wife off from the real world were what really made her sick:

She kept trusting me...I was like a paralyzed man. It's clearer to me now, what she need from me. But I got it all wrong. I tried to shield her from the present, from the city...I tried to conceal the terrifying things, to keep quiet about them. That's what got to her, more than anything else. She couldn't bear it. She couldn't bear that I, too, was silent.

At the end of the novel, Matthias takes the Hale Letters out of the library and burns them. He believes that respecting the last wish of T. S. Eliot - that the letters be burned and not shown to the public - is a step toward atoning for Matthias's personal mistake of sending his wife Judith to a mental institution.

== Historical ==
The actual letters of Eliot to Hale were kept in the Firestone Library, at Princeton University from 1956 to 2020. The letters were released to the public in January 2020, 50 years after Hale's death, per her instructions; in a surprise announcement, the estate of Eliot simultaneously released a posthumous statement from Eliot that he wrote in 1960, specifically for the release of the letters.

== Themes ==
Matthias identifies himself as an "archivist", a "gatekeeper" who controls people's access to information. The term "archivist" applies not only to Matthias, but also to Judith, because she keeps extensive records of Holocaust stories. Judith is emotionally affected by her records; whereas Matthias's relationship to records is merely an effort to protect them, Judith's relationship to records is like that of a fire being fueled. Her passions refuse to be controlled, and she insists on acting upon her feelings, forming a sharp contrast to Matthias's passivity. Judith fascinates Matthias, and terrifies him.

Brian Morton wrote a review of the novel for The New York Times, called it "a thoughtful and well-written first novel." He noted that it brought up serious questions such as morality's relationship with art and religion, and a person's relationship with his or her own past. However, Morton also said that Judith's confinement in a psychiatric ward was limited "by providing Judith with no worthy interlocutors -- with no one who understands her well enough to argue with her in an interesting way."

Arlene Schmuland considers Matthias's final act of burning the Hale letters to be a metaphor for his breaking free of his library's code:

At the end of the novel, he breaks all of the stereotypes about archivists being passive, dedicated to their collections, and devoted to duty by allowing the woman access to a portion of the closed collection and then carrying the whole collection home and burning it in his back yard.

Matthias's decision to burn the library materials has been criticized from an ethical standpoint. Verne Harris, an archivist in South Africa, asked, "In destroying the letters is he protecting Eliot’s rights, serving the writer’s desire, or merely playing god?" Eric Ketelaar, Emeritus Professor at the University of Amsterdam, has written, "The aspect I criticized was that of the archivist as a censor who decides that the memory of Eliot should be kept through his poetry, not through these letters. I censured the archivist who was guided by changes in his personal life to take a decision he was not entitled to take, neither legally nor morally."
