= Burnt Norton =

1936 poem written by T. S. Eliot

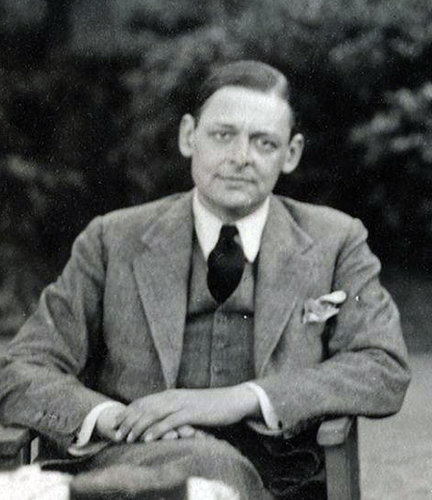
T. S. Eliot in 1934

Burnt Norton is the first poem of T. S. Eliot's Four Quartets. He wrote it while working on his play Murder in the Cathedral, and it was first published in his Collected Poems 1909–1935 (1936). The poem's title refers to the manor house Eliot visited with Emily Hale in the Cotswolds. The manor's garden serves as an important image within the poem. Structurally, the poem is based on Eliot's The Waste Land, with passages of the poem related to those excised from Murder in the Cathedral.

The central discussion within the poem is on the nature of time and salvation. Eliot emphasises the need of the individual to focus on the present moment and to know that there is a universal order. By understanding the nature of time and the order of the universe, mankind is able to recognise God and seek redemption. Many reviewers of Burnt Norton focused on the uniqueness and beauty of the poem. However, others complained that the poem does not reflect Eliot's earlier greatness and that the use of Christian themes harmed the poem.

== Background ==
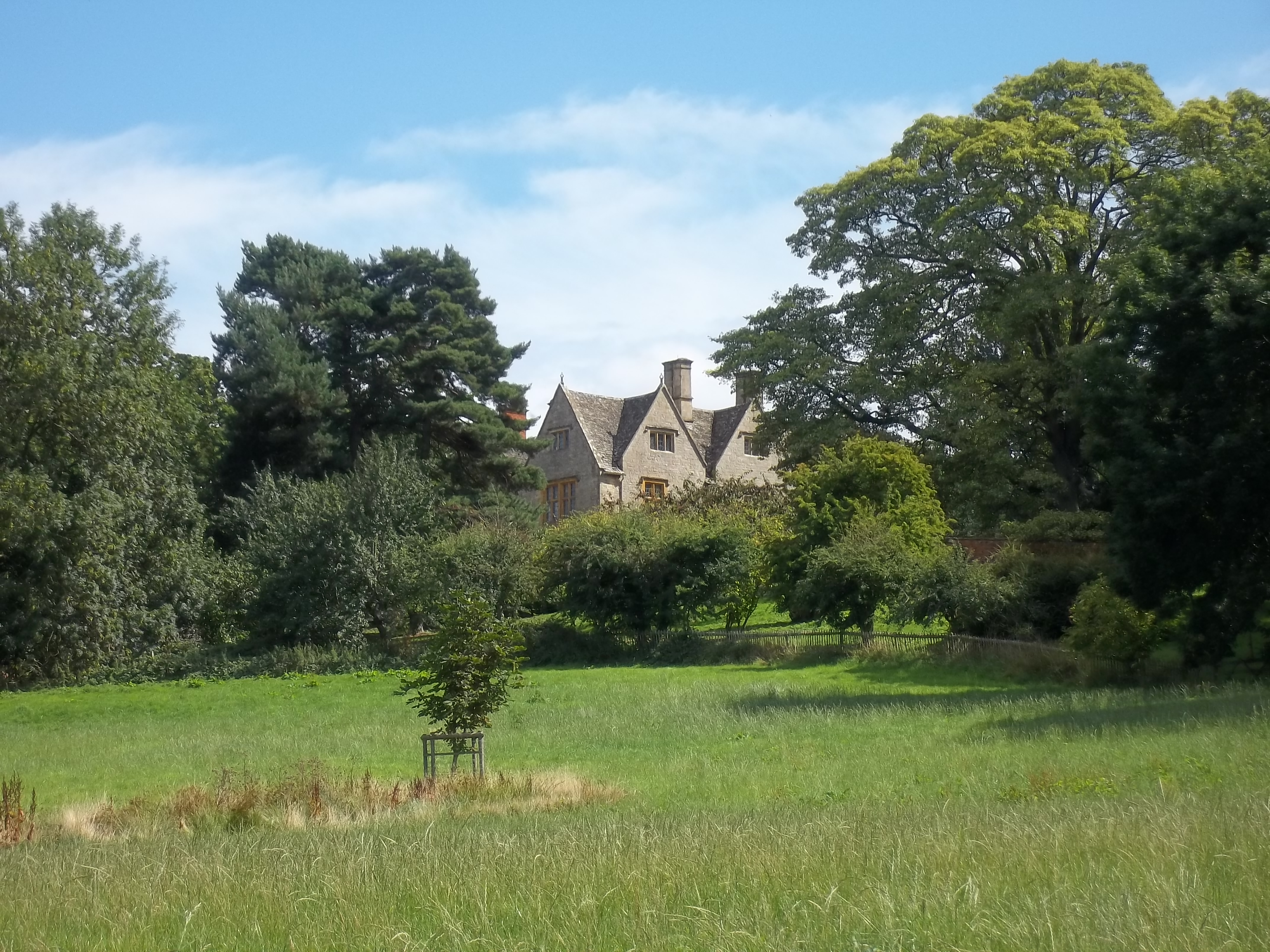
The existing Burnt Norton House in Gloucestershire

The concept of Burnt Norton is connected to Eliot's Murder in the Cathedral; he worked on the poem while the play was being produced during 1935. The connection between the poem and the play is deep; many of the lines for the poem come from lines originally created for the play that were, on E. Martin Browne's advice, removed from the script. Years later, Eliot recollected:

There were lines and fragments that were discarded in the course of the production of Murder in the Cathedral. 'Can't get them over on the stage', said the producer, and I humbly bowed to his judgment. However, these fragments stayed in my mind, and gradually I saw a poem shaping itself round them: in the end it came out as 'Burnt Norton'.

Like many of Eliot's works, the poem was compiled from various fragments that were reworked over many years. To structure the poem, Eliot turned to the organisation of The Waste Land.

In 1936, the poem was included in Collected Poems 1909–1935, of which 11,000 copies were published; the collection symbolically represented the completion of his former poems and his moving on to later works. "Burnt Norton" was Eliot's only major poem to be completed during a six-year period as he turned to writing plays and continued with his work on essays. The poem was re-published as an independent work in 1941, the same year "East Coker" and "The Dry Salvages", two later poems of the Four Quartets, were published.

The actual Burnt Norton is a manor located near the village of Aston Subedge in Gloucestershire that Eliot visited with Emily Hale during 1934. The original Norton House was a mansion burned down in 1741 by its owner, Sir William Keyt, who died in the fire. Even though Eliot was married, he spent a lot of time with Hale and might possibly have become involved with her had he not been married. Even after their time at Burnt Norton, Eliot stayed in close correspondence with her and sent her many of his poems. The actual manor does not serve as an important location within the poem. Instead, it is the garden surrounding the manor that became the focus.

== Poem ==
The poem was the first of Eliot's that relied on speech, with a narrator who speaks to the audience directly. Described as a poem of early summer, air, and grace, it begins with a narrator recalling a moment in a garden. The scene provokes a discussion on time and how the present, not the future or past, really matters to individuals. Memories connect the individual to the past, but the past cannot change, so dwelling on what could have been takes up needless effort.

The poem then transitions from memory to how life works and the point of existence. In particular, the universe is described as orderly and that consciousness is not found within time even though humanity is bound by time. A spiritual "still point of the turning world" is discussed, a state of being which embodies both disruption and order; personal salvation may be found here through thorough introspection. The scene of the poem moves from a garden to the London Underground where technology dominates. Those who cling to technology and reason are unable to understand the universe, and thus condemned to oblivion, partly by their own "distraction". The underworld is replaced by a churchyard and a discussion of death. Images of black clouds, kingfishers, yew trees, and flowers abound, connected by the cyclical nature of eternity. This, in turn, becomes a discussion of timelessness and eternity, and of the importance of love in embodying these, which ends the poem.

== Themes ==
Eliot believed that Burnt Norton could benefit society. The poem's narration reflects on how humankind is affected by Original Sin, that they can follow the paths of either good or evil, and that they can atone for their sins. To help the individual, the poem explains that people must leave the time-bound world and look into themselves, and that poets must seek out a perfection, not bound by time in their images, to escape from the problems of language.

Peter Ackroyd believes that it is impossible to paraphrase the content of the poem; the poem is too abstract to describe the events and the action that make up the poem's narrative structure. However, the philosophical basis for the poem can be explained since the discourse on time is connected to the ideas within St Augustine's Confessions. As such, there is an emphasis on the present moment as being the only time period that really matters, because the past cannot be changed and the future is unknown. The poem emphasizes that memory must be abandoned to understand the current world, and humans must realize that the universe is based on order. The poem also describes that although consciousness cannot be bound within time, humans cannot actually escape from time on their own. The scene beneath London is filled with the time-bound people who are similar to the spiritually empty populace of The Hollow Men; they are empty because they do not understand the Logos or the order of the universe. The conclusion of the poem emphasizes that God is the only one that is truly able to exist out of time and have knowledge of all times and places, but humankind is still capable of redemption through belief in Him and His ability to save them from the bounds of the material universe.

Imaginative space also serves an important function within the poem. Part one contains a rose garden that allegorically represents potential within human existence. Although the garden does not exist, it is described in realistic manner and is portrayed as an imagined reality. Also, the narrator's statement that words exist in the mind allows this imagined reality to be shared between the narrator and the reader. This is then destroyed by the narrator claiming that such a place has no purpose. The garden image has other uses within the poem beyond creating a shared imaginative space; it serves to invoke memories within the poem, and it functions in a similar manner in other works by Eliot, including The Family Reunion.

== Sources ==
A key source for many of the images that appear in Burnt Norton is Eliot's childhood and his experience at Burnt Norton. Other sources include Stéphane Mallarmé's poetry, especially "Le Tombeau de Charles Baudelaire" and "M'introduire dans ton histoire" and Augustine's Confessions. Likewise, many of the lines are fragments that were removed from his earlier works.

Structurally, Eliot relied on The Waste Land to put together the fragments of poetry as one set. Bernard Bergonzi argued that "it was a new departure in Eliot's poetry, and it inevitably resulted in the presence of the manipulatory will that C. K. Stead has observed at work in the Quartets, and in the necessity for low-pressure linking passages. As I have previously remarked, Eliot was capable of expressing the most intense moments of experience, but had little capacity for sustained structure."

== Critical response ==
An early critic, D. W. Harding, viewed the poem as being part of a new concept within poetry. Similarly, Edwin Muir saw that the poem had new aspects to it and felt that there was beauty in the poem similar to that in The Hollow Men. Peter Quennell agreed and described the poem as "a new and remarkably accomplished poem" featuring "uncommon rhythmic virtuosity". Marianne Moore stated that it was "a new poem which is concerned with the thought of control [...] embodied in Deity and in human equipoise". She argued that its "best quality" was "in its reminders of how severe, strenuous, and practical was the poet's approach toward the present enlargement of his philosophical vision." Rolfe Humphries declared, "How beautifully [...] Eliot winds the theme, from the simple statement that perhaps any dialectical materialist would accept [...] to the conclusion that any revolutionist might find difficulty in understanding [...] How beautifully it is done!"

However, George Orwell disapproved of Burnt Norton and stated that the religious nature of the poem coincided with Eliot's poems no longer having what made his earlier works great. The later critic Russell Kirk agreed with Orwell in part, but felt that Orwell's attacks on Eliot's religiosity within the poems fell flat. In particular, he argued that "Over the past quarter of a century, most serious critics—whether or not they find Christian faith impossible—have found in the Quartets the greatest twentieth-century achievements in the poetry of philosophy and religion." Likewise, the 12 April 1941 Times Literary Supplement said that the poem was hard to understand. This was followed by another review on 4 September that attacked Eliot's understanding of history.

Later critics varied in opinions. Bergonzi emphasised the "beautifully controlled and suasive opening" and claimed that "It contains some of Eliot's finest poetry, a true musicalization of thought". According to Peter Ackroyd, "'Burnt Norton', in fact, gains its power and its effects from the modification, withdrawal or suspension of meaning and the only 'truth' to be discovered is the formal unity of the poem itself."
