= Land Settlement Association =

Agricultural scheme set up by UK government (1934–1983)

The Land Settlement Association was a UK Government scheme set up in 1934, with help from the charities the Plunkett Foundation and the Carnegie Trust, to re-settle unemployed workers from depressed industrial areas, particularly from North-East England and Wales. Between 1934 and 1939 1,100 small-holdings were established within 20 settlements. A further five settlements of "Cottage Homesteads" of about half an acre were established from 1937 for unemployed men, who could continue to claim assistance.

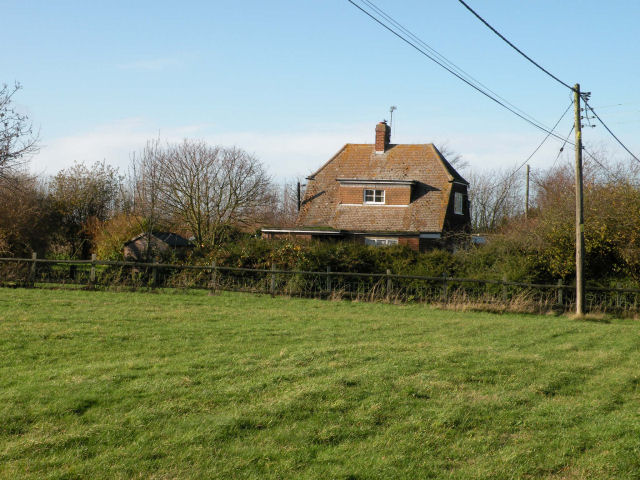
LSA cottage at The Abingtons

Settlements were set up in rural areas where each successful applicant’s family would be given a small-holding of approximately 5 acres (0.020 km^{2}), livestock and a newly built cottage. Small-holdings were grouped in communities which were expected to run agricultural production as cooperative market gardens, with materials bought and produce sold exclusively through the Association. Applicants were vetted and given agricultural training before being assigned a property.

The allocation of settlements to the unemployed was suspended at the outbreak of the Second World War through the necessity of increasing food production; favour was given to those already with horticultural skills. After the war the Association continued, encouraging people who wanted to work in horticulture or agriculture. The scheme was wound-up and all the properties privatised in 1983, by which time it was producing roughly 40% of English home grown salad crops. The residual assets of the scheme were constituted as the LSA Charitable Trust, for the benefit of former tenants and to promote horticultural education.

== Settlements ==
Land Settlement Association small-holding settlements were situated at:

- Abington, Cambridgeshire
- Andover, Hampshire
- Broadwath, Cumbria
- Chawston, Bedfordshire
- Crofton, Cumbria
- Dalston, Cumbria
- Duxbury, Lancashire
- Elmesthorpe, Leicestershire
- Fen Drayton, Cambridgeshire
- Foxash, Essex
- Fulney, Lincolnshire
- Harrowby, Lincolnshire
- Newbourne, Suffolk
- Newent, Gloucestershire
- Oxcroft, Derbyshire
- Potton, Bedfordshire,
- Sidlesham, Sussex
- Snaith, Yorkshire
- Stannington, Northumberland
- Yeldham, Essex

Land Settlement Association Cottage Homestead settlements were situated at:

- Cosby, Leicestershire
- Long Lawford, Warwickshire
- Dunstable, Bedfordshire
- Caversham, Berkshire
- Elmesthorpe, Leicestershire
