= Richard Ryder (politician, born 1766) =

British politician (1766–1832)

The Right Honourable Richard Ryder

Home Secretary
- In office 1 November 1809 – 8 June 1812
- Monarch: George III
- Prime Minister: Hon. Spencer Perceval
- Preceded by: The Lord Hawkesbury
- Succeeded by: The Viscount Sidmouth

Personal details
- Born: 5 July 1766
- Died: 18 September 1832 (aged 66)
- Party: Tory
- Spouse: Frederica Skynner (d. 1821)

Richard Ryder (5 July 1766 – 18 September 1832) was a British Tory politician. He notably served as Home Secretary between 1809 and 1812.

== Background ==
Ryder was a younger son of Nathaniel Ryder, 1st Baron Harrowby and his wife Elizabeth, daughter of the Right Reverend Richard Terrick, Bishop of London. Dudley Ryder, 1st Earl of Harrowby, was his elder brother and the Right Reverend the Hon. Henry Ryder, Bishop of Coventry and of Lichfield, his younger brother.

He was educated at Harrow School and St John's College, Cambridge. He was called to the bar from Lincoln's Inn, of which he was later bencher and treasurer.

== Political career ==
Ryder sat as Member of Parliament for Tiverton from 1795 to 1830 and was sworn of the Privy Council in 1807. From 1809 to 1812 he served as Home Secretary under Spencer Perceval.

== Family ==
Ryder married in 1799 Frederica, daughter of Sir John Skynner, from whom Ryder inherited the Great House in Great Milton, Oxfordshire in 1805. There were no surviving children from this marriage. Frederica died in August 1821. Ryder survived her by eleven years and died in September 1832, aged 66.

Parliament of Great Britain
Preceded by Dudley Ryder; Sir John Duntze	Member of Parliament for Tiverton; 1795–1800; With: Dudley Ryder	Succeeded by Parliament of the United Kingdom
Parliament of the United Kingdom
Preceded by Parliament of Great Britain	Member of Parliament for Tiverton; 1801–1830; With: Dudley Ryder 1801–1803; William Fitzhugh 1803–1819; Viscount Sandon 1819–1830	Succeeded by Viscount Sandon; Granville Ryder
Political offices
Preceded by The Earl of Liverpool	Home Secretary; 1809–1812	Succeeded by The Viscount Sidmouth
