= Sir John Duntze, 1st Baronet =

English merchant, banker and politician

Sir John Duntze, 1st Baronet (c. 1735 – 5 February 1795) was an English merchant, banker and politician who sat in the House of Commons from 1768 to 1795.

Duntze was the son of John Duntze merchant of Exeter and his wife Elizabeth Hawker, daughter of James Hawker or Hawkes of Luppitt, Devon. He was clothier and general merchant at Exeter. He married Frances Lewis, daughter of Samuel Lewis in or before 1765. In 1776 he founded a bank in London with John Halliday and William Mackworth Praed.

Duntze served as Member of Parliament for Tiverton from 1768 until his death in 1795. He was created baronet in 1774.

The family seat was Rockbeare House: Sir John and Lady Duntze are buried at Rockbeare Parish Church, with a memorial in the graveyard.

Parliament of Great Britain
Preceded by Nathaniel Ryder; Charles Gore	Member of Parliament for Tiverton; 1768–1795; With: Nathaniel Ryder to 1776; John Eardley Wilmot 1776–84; Hon. Dudley Ryder from 1784	Succeeded by Hon. Dudley Ryder; Richard Ryder
Baronetage of Great Britain
New creation	Baronet (of Tiverton); 1774–1795	Succeeded by John Duntze
