= Harrowby Hall =

Grade II* listed building in Harrowby, Lincolnshire, England

Coordinates: 52.9115°N 0.6098°W

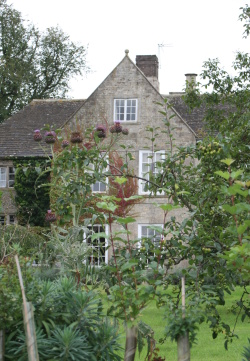
Harrowby Hall

Harrowby Hall is a Grade II* listed building in Harrowby, Lincolnshire, England.

The Hall was the family home of the Ryder family and the former home of Nathaniel Ryder, 1st Baron Harrowby. It was purchased from the Rolt family by Sir Dudley Ryder in 1754.

From 1935 to 1971 Harrowby Estate contained 59 smallholdings as part of the Land Settlement Association scheme.
