= Conroy Ryder, 8th Earl of Harrowby =

British politician

Dudley Adrian Conroy Ryder, 8th Earl of Harrowby, DL, known as Conroy (born 18 March 1951), is a British peer. He was known by the courtesy title of Viscount Sandon from 1987 until 2007.

== Biography ==
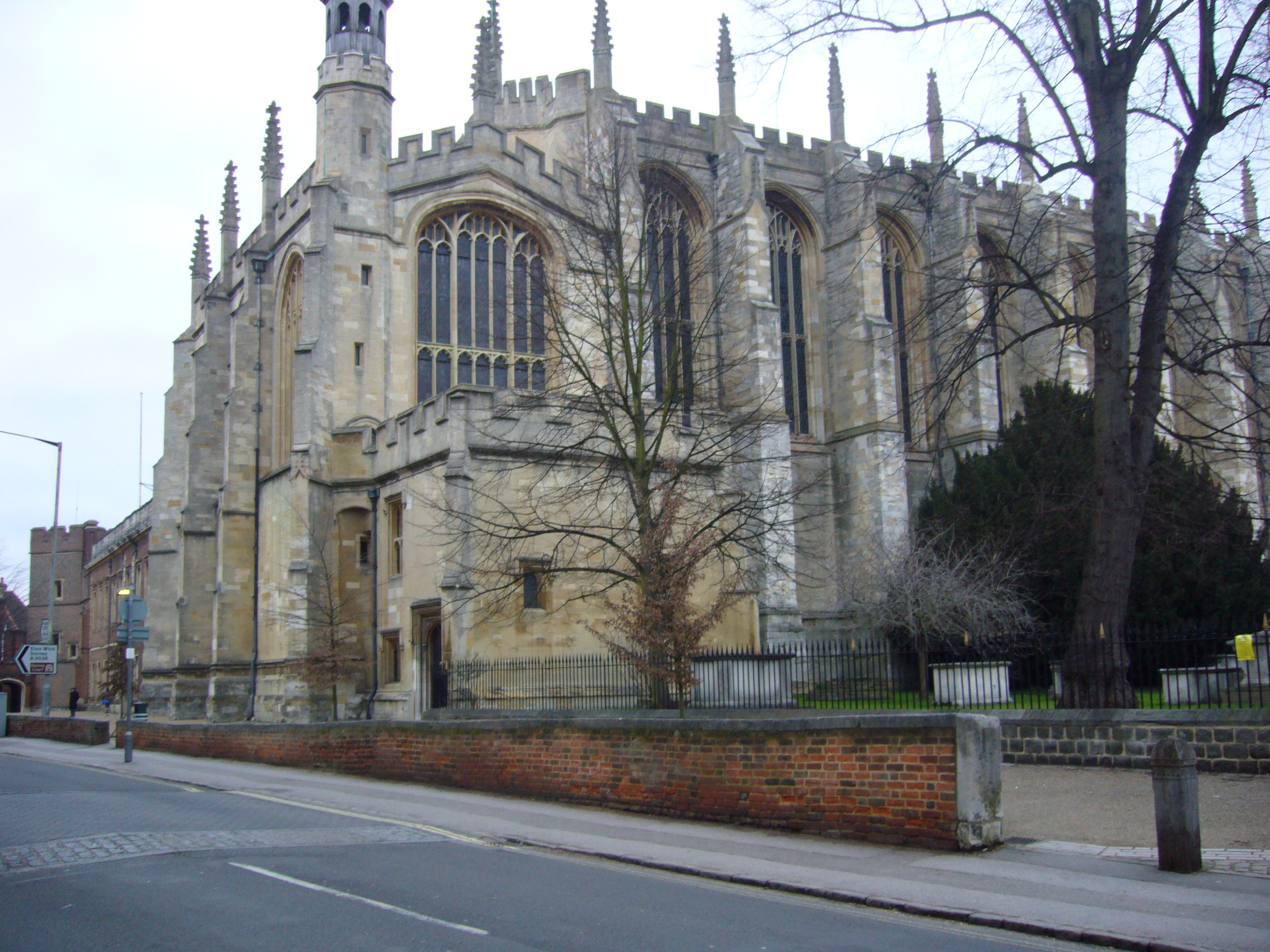
Eton College

Conroy Ryder was born on 18 March 1951. He is the only son of Dudley Ryder, 7th Earl of Harrowby, by his marriage to Jeanette Rosalthe Johnston-Saint. His sister is Lady Rosalthé Frances Rundall.

Harrowby was educated at Eton, Newcastle University, and Magdalene College, Cambridge. He became a director of Compton Street Securities in 1988.

Harrowby succeeded to the earldom on the death of his father on 9 October 2007, when he retired from his job and relocated to manage the family seat, Sandon Hall in Staffordshire, England. The family also owns Burnt Norton House, made famous by T. S. Eliot's Four Quartets.

Harrowby was appointed as a Deputy Lieutenant of Staffordshire on 9 May 2017.

He is a Vice President of the National Churches Trust.

== Marriages and children ==
Harrowby was married, firstly, to Sarah Nichola Hobhouse Payne, daughter of Captain Anthony Denys Phillpotts Payne, in 1977. They had children:

- Hon Henry Mansell Dudley Ryder (born 13 July 1985)
- Lady Emily Georgina Hobhouse Ryder (born 13 January 1992)

Sarah died 29 December 1994.

Harrowby was married, secondly in 1998, to the author Caroline Coram James née Marks, sister of Jonathan Marks.

== Notes ==
Peerage of the United Kingdom
Preceded by Dudley Ryder	Earl of Harrowby; 2007–present	Incumbent
