= Nathaniel Ryder, 1st Baron Harrowby =

British politician

Nathaniel Ryder, 1st Baron Harrowby (3 July 1735 – 20 June 1803) was a British politician who sat in the House of Commons from 1756 to 1776 when he was raised to the peerage as Baron Harrowby.

Ryder was the son of Sir Dudley Ryder, Lord Chief Justice of the King's Bench. He was admitted at Clare College, Cambridge in 1753.

In 1756, Ryder was elected Member of Parliament for Tiverton, a seat he held until 1776. On 20 May 1776 he was raised to the peerage as Baron Harrowby, of Harrowby in the County of Lincoln. He later served Deputy Lieutenant of Staffordshire and Lincolnshire.

Lord Harrowby married Elizabeth Terrick, daughter of the Right Reverend Richard Terrick, Bishop of London, in 1762. Their second son the Hon. Richard Ryder became a successful politician and served as Home Secretary from 1809 to 1812 while their youngest son the Hon. Henry Ryder became Bishop of Gloucester and Bishop of Lichfield. Lord Harrowby died in June 1803, aged 67, and was succeeded in the barony by his eldest son Dudley, who served as Foreign Secretary and was created Earl of Harrowby in 1809. He is commemorated in St Wulframs Church in Grantham. Lady Harrowby died in 1804.

The family home was Harrowby Hall in Lincolnshire.

Parliament of Great Britain
Preceded by Henry Pelham; Thomas Ryder	Member of Parliament for Tiverton; 1756–1776; With: Henry Pelham 1756–58; Edward Hussey-Montagu 1758–62; Charles Gore 1762–68; Sir John Duntze, Bt 1768–76	Succeeded by Sir John Duntze, Bt; John Eardley Wilmot
Peerage of Great Britain
New creation	Baron Harrowby; 1776–1803	Succeeded by Dudley Ryder
