= Duntze baronets =

Title in the Baronetage of Great Britain

Escutcheon of the Duntze baronets of Tiverton

The Duntze baronetcy, of Tiverton in the County of Devon, is a dormant title in the Baronetage of Great Britain. It was created on 8 November 1774 for John Duntze, an Exeter wool merchant and Member of Parliament for Tiverton. The family was of German descent, from Bremen.

The title is marked dormant on the Official Roll of the Baronetage.

== Duntze baronets, of Tiverton (1774) ==
- Sir John Duntze, 1st Baronet (c. 1735–1795)
- Sir John Duntze, 2nd Baronet (c.1765–1830)
- Sir John Lewis Duntze, 3rd Baronet (1809–1884)
- Sir George Alexander Duntze, 4th Baronet (1839–1922)
- Sir George Puxley Duntze, 5th Baronet (1873–1947)
- Sir George Edwin Douglas Duntze, 6th Baronet (1913–1985)
- Sir John Alexander Duntze, 7th Baronet (1909–1987)
- Sir Daniel Evans Duntze, 8th Baronet (1926–1997)
- Daniel Evans Duntze, presumed 9th Baronet (born 1960): his name does not appear on the Official Roll of the Baronetage.

== Extended family ==
John Alexander Duntze, grandson of the 1st Baronet, was an Admiral in the Royal Navy.

Baronetage of Great Britain
Preceded by Wintringham baronets	Duntze baronets of Tiverton; 8 November 1774	Succeeded by Pepperell baronets
