= Margaret Farrand Thorp =

American journalist

Margaret Farrand Thorp (1891–1970) was an American writer, English professor, and journalist. Thorp published six books, including five biographies. She is most noted for her 1939 work America at the Movies and her 1949 work Female Persuasion: Six Strong-Minded Women.

== Early life and education ==
Thorp was born to Wilson Farrand and Margaret Walker Farrand in East Orange, New Jersey on December 3, 1891. She was a niece of history professor Max Farrand, public health advocate Livingston Farrand, and landscape architect Beatrix Farrand. Thorp's father, Wilson, served as the headmaster of Newark Academy in Newark, New Jersey and as a Board Member of Princeton University in Princeton, New Jersey. He helped found the College Entrance Examination Board. (Wilson Farrand also authored the book, A brief history of the Newark academy, 1774-1792-1916.)

In 1909, Thorp graduated from the Beard School (now Morristown-Beard School), a country day preparatory school in Orange, New Jersey. She then completed a bachelor's degree at Smith College in Northampton, Massachusetts in 1914. Thorp earned her master's degree at Smith College in 1926 and her Ph.D. at Yale University in New Haven, Connecticut in 1934. Smith awarded her an honorary doctorate of letters in 1957.

== Journalism and service during WWI ==
After her bachelor's studies, Thorp worked on the writing staff of The Independent, a New York City newspaper led by Hamilton Holt. In October 1917, the American Fund for French Wounded supported her trip to France across the Atlantic on the SS Rochambeau. After arriving in France, she served as the editor of The Weekly Bulletin issued by the Fund in cooperation with the American Red Cross. She also worked as a nurse's aide in hospitals and served at canteens. After joining the Red Cross in March 1918, she assisted publicity work up through the signing of the Armistice at Compiègne. Thorp also served as a correspondent for The Newark Evening News, a newspaper published in Newark, New Jersey.

Following her return to the United States, Thorp served as the director of publicity and as an assistant professor of English at Smith College from 1921 to 1929. She also penned articles for Scribner's Magazine, The Christian Science Monitor, The New York Evening Post, and Smith Alumnae Quarterly.

== Marriage ==
On June 12, 1930, Margaret Thorp married Willard William Thorp, a professor at Princeton University. Willard Thorp led the establishment of the American Civilization program (now the American Studies program) at Princeton;

== Archives ==
The Willard and Margaret Farrand Thorp Papers at Princeton contain her work and those of Willard Thorp. Her papers in the collection include her writings, journals, notebooks, correspondences, and family sketchbooks and photographs.

== Bibliography ==
- 1937: Charles Kingsley, 1819-1875
- 1939: America at the Movies
- 1944: Modern Writing (with Willard Thorp)
- 1949: Female Persuasion: Six Strong-Minded Women
- 1956: Neilson of Smith
- 1966: The Literary Sculptors
- 1966: Sarah Orne Jewett
