= Dudley Ryder, 6th Earl of Harrowby =

British hereditary peer and Member of Parliament

Dudley Ryder, 6th Earl of Harrowby (11 October 1892 – 7 May 1987), known as Viscount Sandon from 1900 to 1956, was a British hereditary peer and Conservative Member of Parliament.

== Early life and education ==
Harrowby was the son of John Ryder, 5th Earl of Harrowby and his wife the Hon Mabel Danvers Smith. William Henry Smith, another former Member of Parliament and a member of the W H Smith bookseller family, was his maternal grandfather.

He was educated at Eton College and Christ Church, Oxford, graduating as BA He received the honorary degree of DLitt from Oxford in 1964.

== Military service ==
Harrowby was a Territorial officer in the Royal Field Artillery and served through World War I, during which he was wounded, rising to the rank of Major. He was re-employed in World War II as a Major with the Royal Artillery. From 1946 to 1950 he was Colonel Commandant of Staffordshire Army Cadet Force.

== Career ==
Harrowby was appointed Assistant Private Secretary to the Secretary of State for the Colonies, Alfred Milner, 1st Viscount Milner from 1919 to 1920. He was elected to the House of Commons for Shrewsbury in 1922, a seat he held until 1923 and again from 1924 to 1929, and was Parliamentary Private Secretary to the Secretary of State for Air Sir Samuel Hoare between 1922 and 1923.

Harrowby was also a member of the Commission on Historical Manuscripts from 1935 to 1966 and was the author of Geography of Everyday Things and (jointly) England at Worship.

In 1956 he succeeded his father in the earldom and entered the House of Lords.

He served in local government as an Alderman of London County Council from 1932 to 1937, then as an elected County Councillor from 1937 to 1940. He also became a Deputy Lieutenant (DL) for Staffordshire in 1925 and a Justice of the Peace (JP) for the same county in 1929.

== Marriage and children ==
Lord Harrowby married Lady Helena Blanche Coventry, daughter of George William Coventry, Viscount Deerhurst (eldest son of George Coventry, 9th Earl of Coventry), on 31 January 1922. They had three children:

- Dudley Danvers Granville Coutts Ryder, 7th Earl of Harrowby (20 December 1922 – 9 October 2007)
- Hon John Stuart Terrick Dudley Ryder (12 April 1924 – 25 October 2012)
- Lady Frances Virginia Susan Ryder (20 June 1926 – 9 June 2013)

== Death ==
Lady Harrowby died in 1974. Lord Harrowby survived her by thirteen years and died in May 1987, at the age of 94. He was succeeded in his titles by his elder son Dudley.

Parliament of the United Kingdom
| Preceded by George Butler Lloyd | Member of Parliament for Shrewsbury; 1922–1923 | Succeeded by Joseph Sunlight |
| Preceded by Joseph Sunlight | Member of Parliament for Shrewsbury; 1924–1929 | Succeeded by Arthur Duckworth |
Peerage of the United Kingdom
| Preceded by John Ryder | Earl of Harrowby; 1956–1987 | Succeeded by Dudley Ryder |
