= Harrowby, Lincolnshire =

Hamlet in the South Kesteven district of Lincolnshire, England

Coordinates: 52.915993°N 0.588190°W

Harrowby
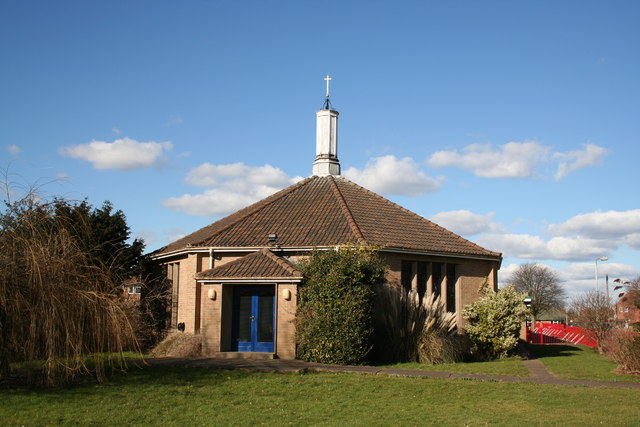
- Church of the Ascension, Harrowby

- Location within Lincolnshire
- OS grid reference: SK950363
  - London: 100 mi (160 km) S
- Civil parish: Londonthorpe and Harrowby Without
- District: South Kesteven
- Shire county: Lincolnshire
- Region: East Midlands
- Country: England
- Sovereign state: United Kingdom
- Post town: Grantham
- Postcode district: NG31
- Police: Lincolnshire
- Fire: Lincolnshire
- Ambulance: East Midlands
- UK Parliament: Grantham and Stamford

Harrowby is a hamlet in the South Kesteven district of Lincolnshire, England. It lies 2 miles (3 km) east of the market town of Grantham. Harrowby was a hamlet in two parts: Harrowby Within (now part of Grantham), and Harrowby Without (part of the parish of Londonthorpe and Harrowby Without), which includes Harrowby Hall.

== Heritage ==
Harrowby is listed in the 1086 Domesday Book as "Herigerbi", with 18 households.

In 1891 the parish had a population of 272. Originally a township of Grantham, Harrowby became a civil parish in 1866, and in 1894 split into two separate civil parishes, Harrowby Within and Harrowby Without. In 1909 Harrowby Within was merged back into the town of Grantham. In October 1930 Harrowby Without was reduced in size to enlarge the town and in 1931 merged into Londonthorpe and Harrowby civil parish.

From 1931 a wooden church dedicated to the Ascension served the village. A more permanent building was designed by Lawrence Bond, erected in 1954 and opened in 1956 by the Bishop of Lincoln. In the early 1960s an octagonal church building was erected, and the former church became the parish hall.
