= Dudley Ryder, 7th Earl of Harrowby =

British hereditary peer

Dudley Danvers Granville Coutts Ryder, 7th Earl of Harrowby, TD (20 December 1922 – 9 October 2007), known as Viscount Sandon from 1956 to 1987, was a British hereditary peer who was deputy chairman of Coutts bank and its parent company, NatWest.

== Early life and education ==
Harrowby was a descendant of Thomas Coutts and of Sir Dudley Ryder, Lord Chief Justice of the King's Bench in the 1750s.

He was born in 1922, the elder son of Dudley Ryder, 6th Earl of Harrowby and his wife Lady Helena Blanche Coventry, daughter of George William Coventry, Viscount Deerhurst, first son of George Coventry, 9th Earl of Coventry. When he was born, his father was the Member of Parliament (MP) for Shrewsbury and Parliamentary Private Secretary to the Sir Samuel Hoare. He was educated at Eton.

== Military service ==
Harrowby joined the young soldiers' battalion of the South Staffordshire Regiment in 1940, while at Eton. He was commissioned in 1942. He landed in Normandy 6 days after D-Day and served in Northern Europe in the Second World War in the 59th (Staffordshire) Infantry Division. He moved to the 133 Field Regiment Royal Artillery in February 1945, part of the 53rd (Welsh) Infantry Division, but was severely injured near the Reichswald forest only a few days later.

After recovering from his injuries, Harrowby was posted to the Far East in preparation for the invasion of Malaya, Operation Zipper. The operation was abandoned following the surrender of Japan. He remained in the Far East after the war, serving as a political officer with the 5th Battalion of the Parachute Regiment in Java, under Laurens van der Post. He continued as an officer in the Territorial Army after he retired from the regular Army, rising to rank of lieutenant-colonel before retiring in 1964, having commanded the 254 (City of London) Field Regiment Royal Artillery.

== Career ==
Although he did not follow many of his ancestors in standing for Parliament, Harrowby was a councillor in the Royal Borough of Kensington and Chelsea from 1950 to 1971. He was president of the Wolverhampton South West Conservative Association, resigning in protest after the sitting MP, Enoch Powell, made his "rivers of blood" speech in 1968.

He turned down a place at New College, Oxford to join the family bank after leaving the Army, and became a managing director in 1949. He continued in that role until 1989, and was also deputy chairman from 1970 to 1989. He was responsible for the modernisation of the bank during the 1970s and 1980s, introducing computerisation and co-ordinating a redevelopment of the bank's offices on the Strand to a design by Sir Frederick Gibberd. When Coutts' parent company, National Provincial Bank, merged with Westminster Bank in 1968, he joined the board of the combined NatWest Bank. He was deputy chairman of NatWest from 1971 to 1987.

He was also a director of the National Provident Institution until 1986 and of the Saudi International Bank, Bentley Engineering, Powell Duffryn, Dowty and Dinorwic Slate Quarries. He also held public appointments, including being chairman of the governors of the combined Bethlem Royal and Maudsley hospitals, a governor of the University of Keele, and treasurer of the Family Welfare Association. He was also a member of the Trilateral Commission and of the Institut International d’Etudes Bancaires.

He took the courtesy title of Viscount Sandon following the death of his grandfather in 1956 and succeeded his father as Earl of Harrowby in 1987. He also inherited the family seat, neo-Jacobean Sandon Hall near Stafford, designed by William Burn in 1850. Together with all but 90 hereditary peers, he lost his seat in the House of Lords after the passing of the House of Lords Act 1999 implemented reforms proposed by the Labour Government.

== Marriages and children ==
Harrowby married Jeannette Rosalthé Johnston-Saint, younger daughter of Captain Peter Johnston-Saint, on 14 June 1949. They had a son and a daughter:

- Dudley Adrian Conroy Ryder, 8th Earl of Harrowby (born 18 March 1951)
- Lady Rosalthé Frances Ryder (born 1 May 1954)

His first wife died in 1997. He was married secondly in 2003 to Janet Boote (née Stott), youngest daughter of Alan Edward Stott.

== Death ==
Lord Harrowby died suddenly at Sandon Hall on 9 October 2007 of a suspected heart attack at the age of 84. He was survived by his second wife and the two children from his first marriage. His son, Conroy, succeeded him in the earldom and other titles.

Peerage of the United Kingdom
Preceded by Dudley Ryder	Earl of Harrowby; 1987–2007	Succeeded by Dudley Adrian Conroy Ryder
