= Dudley Ryder, 1st Earl of Harrowby =

British politician (1762–1847)

The Right Honourable The Earl of Harrowby PC FSA
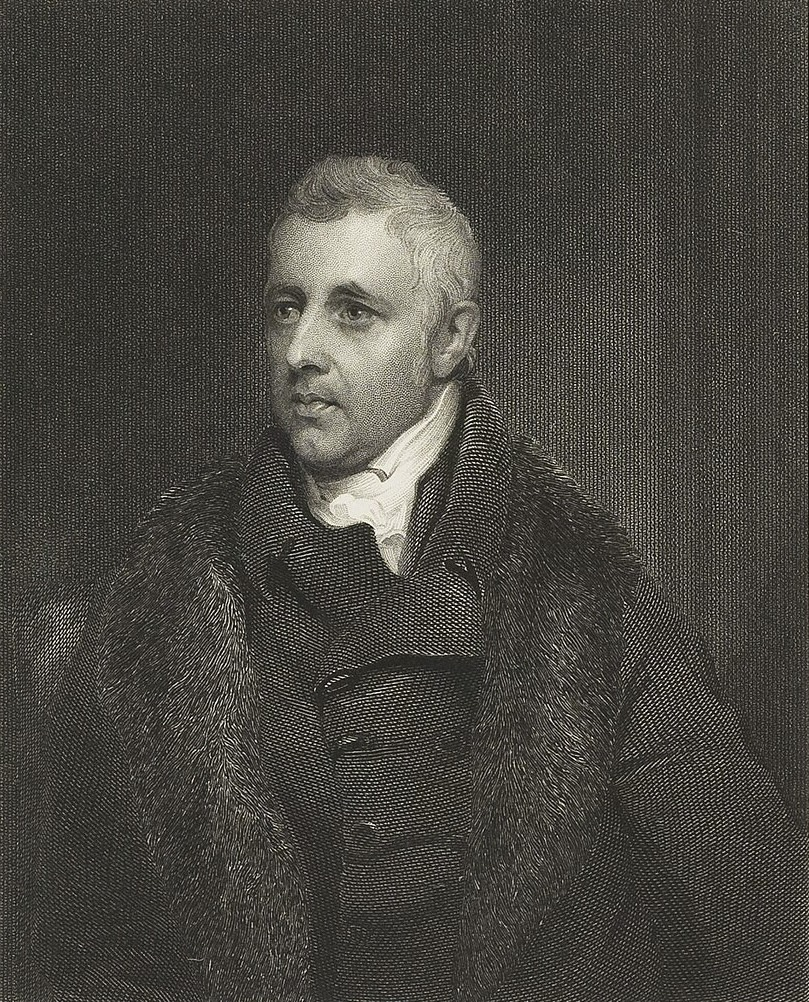
- Engraving, c. 1844

Secretary of State for Foreign Affairs
- In office 14 May 1804 – 11 January 1805
- Monarch: George III
- Prime Minister: William Pitt the Younger
- Preceded by: The Lord Hawkesbury
- Succeeded by: The Lord Mulgrave

Lord President of the Council
- In office 11 June 1812 – 17 August 1827
- Monarchs: George III; George IV
- Prime Minister: The Earl of Liverpool
- Preceded by: The Viscount Sidmouth
- Succeeded by: The Duke of Portland

Personal details
- Born: 22 December 1762 London
- Died: 26 December 1847 (aged 85) Sandon Hall, Staffordshire
- Resting place: Lichfield Cathedral
- Party: Tory
- Spouse: Lady Susanna Leveson-Gower (m. 1795; died 1838)
- Children: 8, including Dudley and Granville
- Parent(s): Nathaniel Ryder, 1st Baron Harrowby; Elizabeth Terrick
- Education: St John's College, Cambridge

Dudley Ryder, 1st Earl of Harrowby, PC, FSA (22 December 1762 – 26 December 1847) was a prominent British politician of the Pittite faction and the Tory party.

== Background and education ==
Born in London, Ryder was the eldest son of Nathaniel Ryder, 1st Baron Harrowby, and his wife Elizabeth (née Terrick). Sir Dudley Ryder was his grandfather and Richard Ryder his younger brother. He was educated at Harrow School and St John's College, Cambridge.

== Political career ==
Harrowby was elected to his father's old Parliament seat of Tiverton in 1784. His administrative career began with an appointment to be Joint Parliamentary Under-Secretary of State for Foreign Affairs in 1789. In 1791 he was appointed joint Paymaster of the Forces, having been made Vice-President of the Board of Trade in 1790. He resigned the positions and also that of Treasurer of the Navy when he succeeded to his father's barony in June 1803. In 1804 he was Secretary of State for Foreign Affairs. After James Monroe's first interview with him on 30 May 1804, "...Monroe reported to his Government that Lord Harrowby's manners were designedly unfriendly; his reception was rough, his comments on the Senate's habit of mutilating treaties were harsh, his conduct throughout the interview was calculated to wound and to irritate."

In 1805 he was Chancellor of the Duchy of Lancaster under his intimate friend William Pitt; in the latter year he was sent on a special and important mission to the emperors of Austria and Russia and the king of Prussia as part of the Hanover Expedition. In 1809 he was honoured when he was made Viscount Sandon, of Sandon in the County of Stafford, and Earl of Harrowby, in the County of Lincoln. From November 1809 to June 1812 he served as Minister without portfolio in the cabinet of Spencer Perceval.

From 1812 to 1827, he served as Lord President of the Council under Lord Liverpool. After George Canning's death in 1827, Harrowby refused to serve George IV as prime minister and never held office again. Despite this he continued to take part in politics, being especially prominent during the deadlock which preceded the passing of the Reform Bill in 1832. Harrowby's long association with the Tories did not prevent him from assisting to remove the disabilities of Roman Catholics and Protestant dissenters, or from supporting the movement for electoral reform; he was also in favour of the emancipation of the slaves. He was a member of the Literary Association of the Friends of Poland.

== Family ==
Lord Harrowby married Lady Susanna Leveson-Gower, daughter of Granville Leveson-Gower, 1st Marquess of Stafford, in 1795. They had the following children:

- Lady Susan Ryder (1796–1827), married Hugh Fortescue, 2nd Earl Fortescue^{§}
- Dudley Ryder, 2nd Earl of Harrowby (1798–1882)
- Granville Dudley Ryder MP (1799–1879)
- Lady Mary Ryder (1801–1900), married Admiral Edward Saurin (son of William Saurin)
- Lady Georgiana Elizabeth Ryder (1804–1844), married John Stuart-Wortley, 2nd Baron Wharncliffe
- Frederick Dudley Ryder (1806–1882)
- Edward Henry Dudley Ryder (1809–1811)
- Lady Harriet Charlotte Sophia Ryder (1811–1899), married Rev. Lord Charles Hervey
- Lady Louisa Elizabeth Ryder (1813–1899), married Capt. George Fortescue MP^{§}

^{§} Earl Fortescue and George Fortescue were brothers.

Lady Susanna died in May 1838. Lord Harrowby survived her by nine years and died in December 1847 at his Staffordshire residence, Sandon Hall, aged 85, being, as Charles Cavendish Fulke Greville says, "the last of his generation and of the colleagues of Mr Pitt, the sole survivor of those stirring times and mighty contests."

== Notes ==
Parliament of Great Britain
| Preceded by Sir John Duntze; John Eardley Wilmot | Member of Parliament for Tiverton; 1784 – 1801; With: Sir John Duntze 1784–1795; Richard Ryder 1795–1801 | Succeeded by Parliament of the United Kingdom |
Parliament of the United Kingdom
| Preceded by Parliament of Great Britain | Member of Parliament for Tiverton; 1801–1803; With: Richard Ryder | Succeeded by Richard Ryder; William Fitzhugh |
Political offices
| Preceded by John Charles Villiers | Comptroller of the Household; 1790–1791 | Succeeded by The Earl of Macclesfield |
| Preceded by The Duke of Montrose | Vice-President of the Board of Trade; 1790–1801 | Succeeded by The Lord Glenbervie |
| Preceded by The Lord Mulgrave; The Duke of Montrose | Paymaster of the Forces; 1791–1800; With: Thomas Steele | Succeeded by Thomas Steele; George Canning |
| Preceded by Henry Dundas | Treasurer of the Navy; 1800–1801 | Succeeded by Charles Bragge |
| Preceded by The Lord Hawkesbury | Foreign Secretary; 1804–1805 | Succeeded by The Lord Mulgrave |
| Preceded by The Earl of Buckinghamshire | Chancellor of the Duchy of Lancaster; 1805–1806 | Succeeded by The Earl of Derby |
| Preceded by Robert Dundas | President of the Board of Control; 1809 | Succeeded by Robert Dundas |
| Preceded by The Viscount Sidmouth | Lord President of the Council; 1812–1827 | Succeeded by The Duke of Portland |
Honorary titles
| Preceded by The Viscount Sidmouth | Senior Privy Counsellor; 1844–1847 | Succeeded by The Duke of Cumberland and Teviotdale |
Peerage of the United Kingdom
| New creation | Earl of Harrowby; 1809–1847 | Succeeded by Dudley Ryder |
Peerage of Great Britain
| Preceded by Nathaniel Ryder | Baron Harrowby; 1803–1847 | Succeeded by Dudley Ryder |
