= Sandon =

Sandon may refer to:

== Places ==
- Sandon, British Columbia
- Sandon, Essex
- Sandon, Hertfordshire
- Sandon, Staffordshire
  - Salt and Sandon railway station
  - Sandon Hall, a 19th-century country mansion
  - Sandon railway station
- Sandon, Victoria
  - Sandon tornado, 1976
- Sandon County, New South Wales
- Sandon Point, New South Wales
- Sandon River, New South Wales
- Gotska Sandön, a Swedish island
- Jävre Sandön, a Swedish island
- Sandön, Luleå

== People ==
=== Surname ===
- Carel Sandon (born 1983), Zairean-born Italian professional lightweight boxer
- Flo Sandon's (1924–2006), Italian singer
- Frank Sandon (1890–1979), British swimmer who competed at the 1912 Summer Olympics
- Henry Sandon (1928–2023), English antiques expert
- John Sandon (born 1959), English antiques expert
- Johnny Sandon (1941–1996), English singer
- Mal Sandon (born 1945), Australian politician
- Viscount Sandon, a courtesy title of the Earl of Harrowby

=== Given name ===
- Sandon (philosopher) (1st century BC), Orphic philosopher
- Sandon Berg (born 1971), American film producer, screenwriter and actor
- Sandon Stolle (born 1970), Australian former professional tennis player

== Other uses ==
- Sandon (god), an ancient Hittite deity
- Sandon Dock, a former dock on the River Mersey
  - Sandon Dock railway station
- Sandon Half Tide Dock, Merseyside
- Sandon High School, Stoke-on-Trent
- The Sandon School, Chelmsford, Essex

== See also ==
- Sandown (disambiguation)
