= Gayton, Staffordshire =

Village in Staffordshire, England

Coordinates: 52.854°N 2.027°W

Gayton
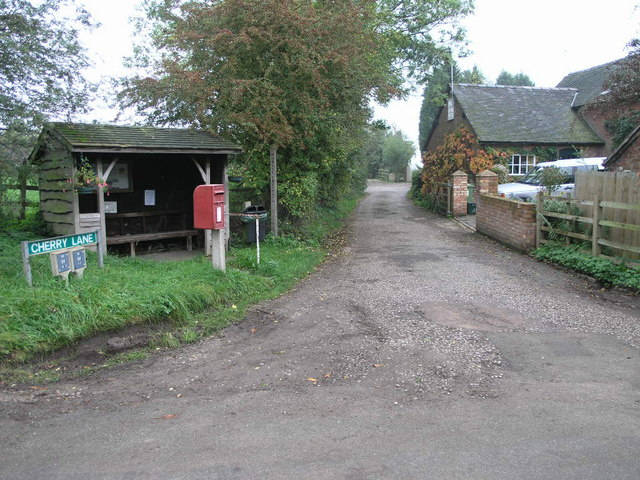
- Cherry Lane, Gayton

- Location within Staffordshire
- Population: 154 (2011)
- OS grid reference: SJ978285
- District: Stafford
- Shire county: Staffordshire
- Region: West Midlands
- Country: England
- Sovereign state: United Kingdom
- Post town: Stafford
- Postcode district: ST18
- Dialling code: 01889
- Police: Staffordshire
- Fire: Staffordshire
- Ambulance: West Midlands
- UK Parliament: Stone

Gayton is a small rural village and civil parish in Staffordshire, located approximately 1 mile from the A51 between Stone and Stafford. In 2001 it had 167 residents, with 1 letter box, one bus stop, and new village hall. The post box is owned now by the village as is the telephone booth. The post code for Gayton properties normally start with ST18.

== History ==
The name Gayton is believed to mean either "a primitive enclosure approached from a gate or narrow way, from the Anglo-Saxon 'geat'" or "'Gaegas dwelling', derived from an Old English personal name").

Gayton (recorded as Gaitone) was listed in the Domesday Book (1086 AD), together with nearby Amerton, in the Pirehill hundred, as having 8 households, with 10 villagers and 6 smallholders, and the Tenant-in-Chief was Earl Roger of Shrewsbury. Agriculturally, they had 4 ploughlands, 1 lord's plough teams and 4 men's plough teams, and had a value to lord of £1.5, with the total amount of tax assessed 0.5 geld units. The village was documented to be held by Aelmer and Alric. It was also documented to have woodland of "1 league in length and half a league in breadth".

The Hearth Tax Assessment of 1666 documented that Gayton had 33 households liable for the payment of 48 hearths. The largest property was owned by George White who had six hearths. Seven households were deemed too poor to be able to pay the tax.

In 1851, Gayton was a 'scattered village', with 291 residents, and with 'commanding views over of Sandon Column, the plantations of the Earl of Harrowby, and the picturesque ruins of Chartley Castle.' The parish contained '1475 acres 2 roods 26 perches of fertile, loamy land, of which Earl Ferrers is the principal owner, and lord of the manor'.

Gayton was described in John Marius Wilson's Imperial Gazetteer of England and Wales in 1870-72 like this:

GAYTON, a parish in the district and county of Stafford; near the river Trent and the Grand Trunk canal, 1 mile NE of Weston r. station, and 5 NE of Stafford. It has a post office under Stafford. Acres, 1, 270. Real property, £2, 833. Pop., 249. Houses, 63. The living is a vicarage in the diocese of Lichfield. Value, £136.* Patron, Mrs. Mould. The church is good; and there are charities £5.

The most significant Post-Medieval development in the Gayton area happened in the mid-nineteenth century, when the North Staffordshire Railway opened in 1848, with a stop in nearby Weston and Ingestre railway station. The station was roughly 3/4 of a mile southwest of the village, but it closed in 1963. During World War Two a Royal Observer Corps Monitoring Post was installed south of the village on Wadden Farm, and is still in good condition today. It was built to act as an early warning system for nearby Hixon Airfield.

== Demography ==
Population change
Year	1801	1811	1821	1831	1841	1851	1881	1891	1901	1911	1921	1931	1951	1961	2001
Households				61	65	64	57	49	46		42	42	44	44	63
Population	273	261	284	296	291	264	236	236	180	201	185	182	158	156	167

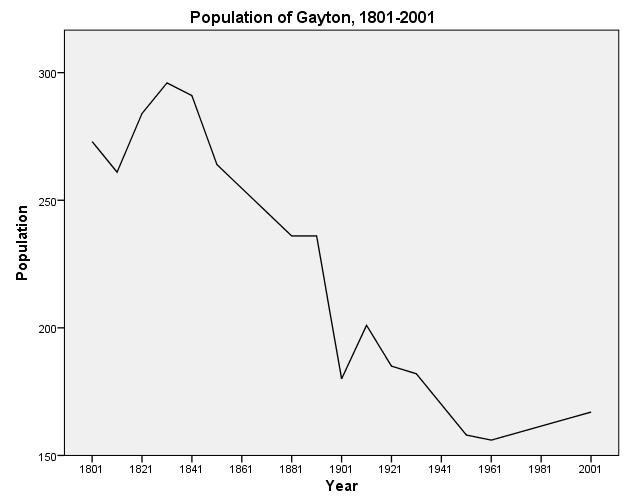
Population Change in Gayton 1801-2001

Gayton, in the 2001 Census, has a population of 167 in a total of 63 households. The population has fallen from a peak of 296 in 1831 , since which the population seems to have steadily decreased. This is most likely due to rural to urban migration from small villages like Gayton to bigger centres. The decline in agriculture in England is also a possible contributor to the decreasing population.

=== 1831 Occupational statistics ===
Gayton Occupation Categories, 1831
1831 Occupation Categories	1831
Farmers employing Labourers	9
Farmers not employing Labourers	15
Agricultural Labourers	20
Manufacturing	0
Retail & Handicrafts	22
Capitalists, Professionals	0
Labourers (Non-Agricultural)	1
Servants	5
Other	7

The occupational structure of Gayton males aged 20 or over, as reported in the 1831 Census, shows that the majority of workers were either farmers or agricultural labourers, as was typical for a rural community in the 1830s. There were also a relatively high number of men working in retail and handicrafts. However, as Gayton was relatively distant from any major manufacturing or commercial centres, there were no people residing in Gayton from these occupations.

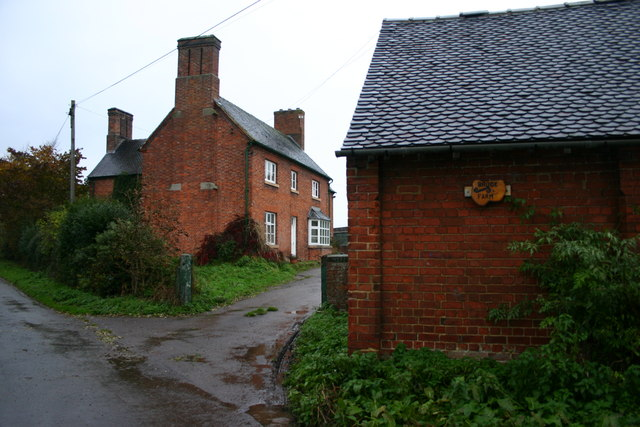
Brook Farm, Gayton

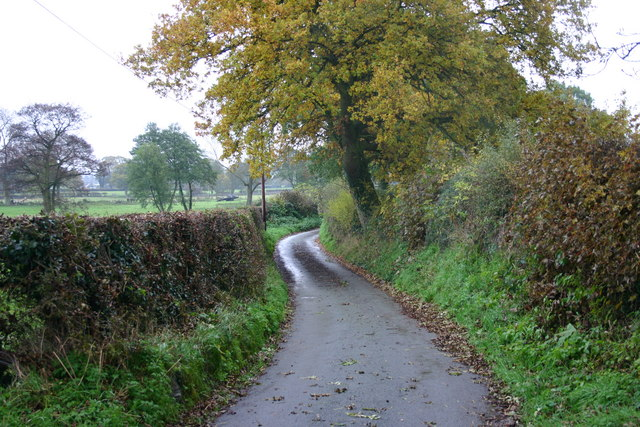
Country lane leading to Gayton

=== 1881 Occupational statistics ===
Gayton Occupation Categories, 1881
1881 Occupational Orders	Male	Female
General/Local Government	1	0
Professionals	0	1
Domestic Service or Offices	1	11
Commercial Operations	1	1
Agriculture	32	1
Animals	1	0
Workers in House, Furniture and Decorations	1	0
Workers in Carriages and Harnesses	4	0
Workers in Food and Lodging	2	1
Workers in Dress	2	3
Workers in Various Mineral Substances	2	0
Workers in General or Unspecified Commodities	10	0
Persons without specified Occupations	3	6
Unknown Occupation	0	40

The 1881 Occupational Statistics show that a majority of male workers worked in the agricultural sector, while women (if they worked) worked more in domestic service. The number of people who were in professional and governmental occupations was minimal due to Gayton's rural location, and many women were unaccounted for, these most likely being housewives. Compared to the 1831 statistics, the overall pattern of employment was roughly the same as in 1831, however, the inclusion of women into the statistics gives a more complete view of the employment patterns of the nineteenth century in rural communities.

== Amenities ==
Gayton has one post box, one bus stop and a village hall. The nearest Post Office is in the village hall of Weston, which opened on 1 March 2012. There also used to be a hotel, the Gayton Hotel, which opened in 1904, however, this has since been demolished and houses built upon the site.

=== Village Hall ===
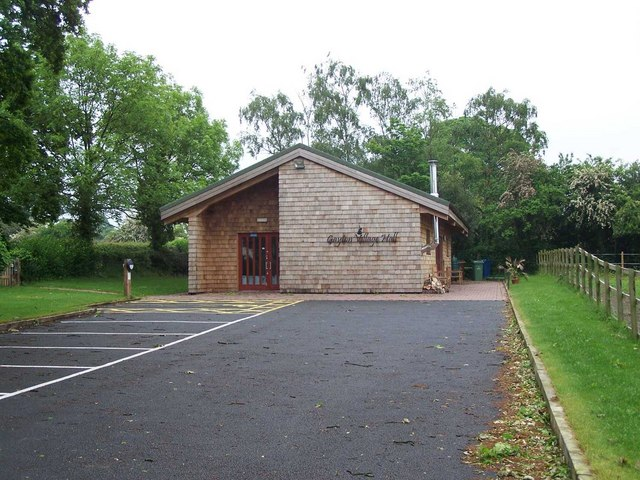
Gayton Village Hall

Gayton Village Hall is a multi-purpose facility, located just off Church Lane, which has a fully licensed bar, and is used for many local events including flower arranging, coffee mornings and twice monthly get together meets.

== Public Transport ==
There is no bus service to or from Gayton. The nearest railway station is Stafford railway station, with regular services to London, Stoke-on-Trent, Birmingham, Manchester and Liverpool.

== St. Peter's Church ==
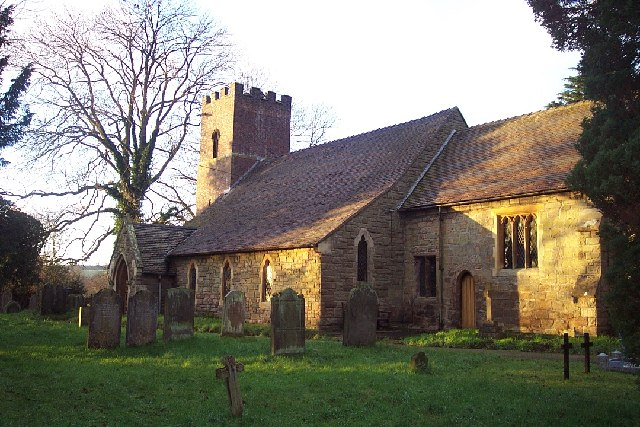
St. Peter, Gayton

St. Peter is the parish church of Gayton, and is part of the Diocese of Lichfield. The oldest part of the church is the archway between the nave and the chancel, dating from the 12th Century, with the body of the chancel added in the 13th century. The earliest parish register dates from 1584. The tower in the west end was added in 1732, the same time as the blocking of the archways in the northern arcades, and the south aisle of the nave and its porch, the east wall of the chancel and the vestry attached to its north wall all date from a rebuild undertaken during the 1870s.

In 1851, St. Peter was described in History, Gazetteer and Directory of Staffordshire by William White as

"The Parish Church, St Peter, was partly rebuilt about 120 years ago, and appears to have been much larger, for it is said that an ancient tomb, now in the churchyard, with a recumbent effigy of one of the Ferrers family upon it, was formerly in one of the aisles. The perpetual curacy is in the patronage of the Mrs Mould, and the incumbency is held, with that of Stowe, by the Rev William Hides, BA." [From History, Gazetteer and Directory of Staffordshire, William White, Sheffield, 1851]

Gayton is also the documented site of a Holy Well used in medieval and post-medieval times, although this is believed to have dried out.

== Notable residents ==
James Robert Oldham, Yorkshire cricketer

== See also ==
- Listed buildings in Gayton, Staffordshire
