= Weston and Ingestre railway station =

Former railway station in Staffordshire, England

Weston and Ingestre

General information
- Location: Weston, Stafford; England
- Coordinates: 52.8420°N 2.0339°W
- Grid reference: SJ978271

Other information
- Status: Disused

History
- Pre-grouping: North Staffordshire Railway
- Post-grouping: London Midland and Scottish Railway

Key dates
- 1 May 1849: Opened
- 6 January 1947: Closed
Location

Weston and Ingestre railway station was a former British railway station opened by the North Staffordshire Railway to serve the village of Ingestre in Staffordshire in 1849.

Nearby was the Ingestre and Weston station opened by the Stafford and Uttoxeter Railway in 1867.

It closed in January 1947.

Preceding station	Historical railways	Following station
Sandon Line and station open	North Staffordshire Railway Stone to Colwich Line	Hixon Line open, station closed
