= Ingestre railway station =

Disused railway station in Staffordshire, England

Ingestre and Weston
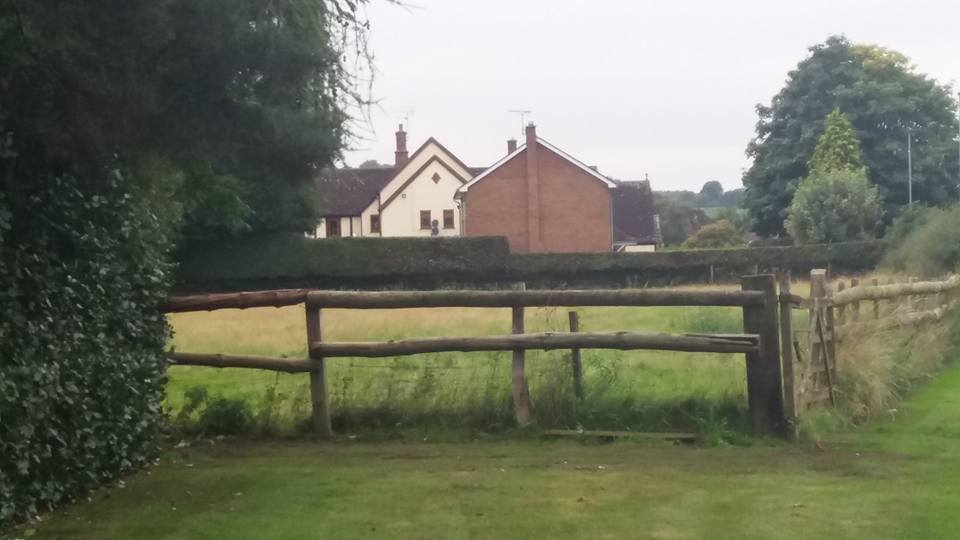
- Site of Ingestre station (2017)

General information
- Location: Weston, Borough of Stafford, England
- Coordinates: 52.8375°N 2.0348°W
- Grid reference: SJ977266
- Platforms: 2

Other information
- Status: Disused

History
- Original company: Stafford and Uttoxeter Railway
- Pre-grouping: Great Northern Railway
- Post-grouping: London and North Eastern Railway

Key dates
- 23 December 1867: Station opened as Weston
- January 1870: Renamed Ingestre for Weston
- date unknown: Renamed Ingestre
- 4 December 1939: Station closed
Location

Ingestre and Weston railway station served the village of Weston, in Staffordshire, England, between 1870 and 1939.

== History ==
The station was opened by the Stafford and Uttoxeter Railway in 1867. Originally called Weston, it was later renamed Ingestre and Weston in deference to nearby Ingestre Hall, the home of the Earl of Shrewsbury. It was renamed again in 1870 to Ingestre for Weston to avoid confusion with nearby Weston and Ingestre railway station on the North Staffordshire Railway.

The Stafford and Uttoxeter Railway was purchased for £100,000 by the Great Northern Railway in July 1881 and the line subsequently passed into London and North Eastern Railway ownership on Railway Grouping in 1923.

Proceeding north-west, the line passed over the North Staffordshire Railway's main line from Stone to Colwich; it then climbed slightly towards Chartley and Stowe.

Passenger services ended in 1939 and the station was closed.

Preceding station	Disused railways	Following station
Salt and Sandon Line and station closed	Great Northern Railway Stafford and Uttoxeter Railway	Chartley Line and station closed
