= Sandown (disambiguation) =

Sandown is a town on the Isle of Wight, England.

Sandown may also refer to:

- Sandown, Gauteng, a suburb of Johannesburg, South Africa
- Sandown, New Hampshire, a town in the United States
- Sandown Castle, Kent, England
- Sandown Park Racecourse, a racecourse in Surrey, England
- Sandown Racecourse, a racecourse in Melbourne, Australia
- Sandown Raceway, a motor racing circuit in Melbourne, Australia
- Sandown 500, an event at Sandown Raceway
- Sandown (ship), any of several commercial vessels by that name
- HMS Sandown, one of at least three British naval vessels by that name
- Sandown-class minehunter, a class of minehunter ships of the Royal Navy
