= Athenodorus Cananites =

Greek Stoic philosopher (c. 74 BC – 7 AD)

- Ἀθηνόδωρος Κανανίτης
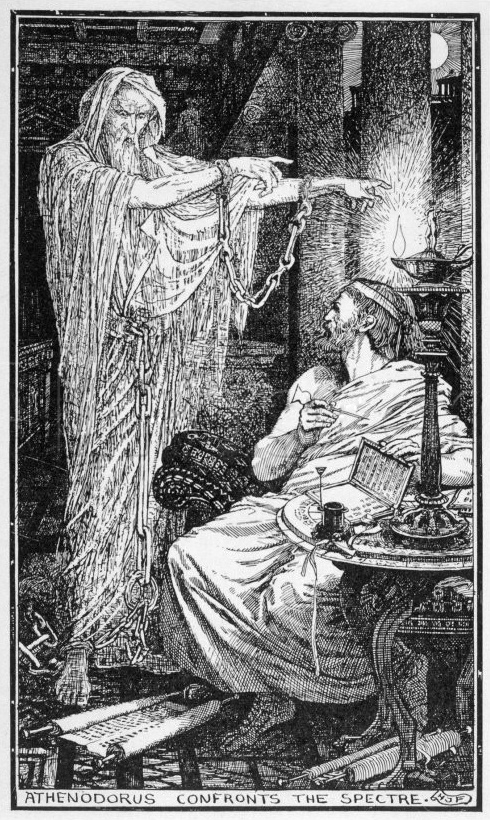
- Athenodorus and the ghost, by Henry Justice Ford, c. 1900
- Born: c. 74 BC; Canana, near Tarsus (now Tarsus, Mersin, Turkey)
- Died: 7 AD
- Occupations: Philosopher and teacher
- Relatives: Sandon (father)

Philosophical work
- Era: Ancient philosophy
- Region: Western philosophy
- School: Stoicism

Athenodorus Cananites (Greek: Ἀθηνόδωρος Κανανίτης, Athenodoros Kananites; ca. 74 BC – 7 AD) was a Stoic philosopher.

== Life ==
Athenodorus was born in Canana, near Tarsus (in modern-day Turkey); his father was Sandon. He was a student of Posidonius of Rhodes, and the teacher of Octavian (the future Caesar Augustus) at Apollonia. He was a personal friend of Strabo, from whom we derive some knowledge of his life.

In 44 BC, he seems to have followed Octavian to Rome and continued mentoring him there. He is reputed there to have openly rebuked the Emperor, and to have instructed him to recite the alphabet before reacting in anger. Later, Athenodorus returned to Tarsus, where he was instrumental in expelling the government of Boethus of Cilicia and drafting a new constitution for the city, the result of which was a pro-Roman oligarchy.

Athenodorus is also written of by Pliny the Younger, who tells us of Athenodorus' renting of a haunted house in Athens. Athenodorus was wary because the house was exceptionally cheap for its size. When Athenodorus was writing a book of philosophy, late at night, a ghost is said to have come to him. The ghost, who was bound with chains and leg irons, beckoned Athenodorus to follow him, but was allegedly indicated by Athenodorus to wait. After he finished his writing, the ghost led him to a courtyard, and suddenly vanished. Athenodorus marked the spot, and the next day, with the permission of the city magistrates, he dug up the earth from that spot, where he found the skeleton of an old man, bound with chains. After the skeleton was given a proper burial with full honours, the ghost was said to have never haunted that house again. The legend corresponds to Aarne-Thompson-Uther tale type 326A, "Soul Released"."

== Works ==
Strabo, Cicero, and Eusebius regarded him highly. Works attributed to Athenodorus include:

- A work against the Categories of Aristotle (although this is sometimes credited to Athenodoros Cordylion).
- A history of Tarsus.
- A work of some kind dedicated to Octavia Minor.
- A work entitled περὶ σπουδῆς και παιδείας ("On zeal and education").
- A work entitled περίπατοι ("Perambulations").

None of these are extant, but he also assisted Cicero in writing his De Officiis and it has been suggested that his work may have influenced Seneca and Saint Paul. Following his death, the people of Tarsus held an annual festival and sacrifice in his honour.
