= Listed buildings in Gayton, Staffordshire =

Gayton is a civil parish in the Borough of Stafford, Staffordshire, England. It contains two listed buildings that are recorded in the National Heritage List for England. Of these, one is at Grade II*, the middle of the three grades, and the other is at Grade II, the lowest grade. The parish contains the village of Gayton and the surrounding countryside, and the listed buildings consist of a church and a farmhouse.

== Key ==
Grade	Criteria
II*	Particularly important buildings of more than special interest
II	Buildings of national importance and special interest

== Buildings ==
Name and location	Photograph	Date	Notes	Grade
St Peter's Church; 52.85328°N 2.03345°W		12th century	The oldest part of the church is the chancel arch, the arcades date from the 13th and 14th centuries, the nave and tower were rebuilt in 1732, and the church was restored in 1870 by Habershon and Pite. Most of the church is built in sandstone, with brick in the tower and north side of the nave, and the roofs are tiled. The church consists of a nave, a south aisle, a south porch, a chancel, a north vestry, and a west tower. The tower has three stages, a two-light west window, and an embattled parapet. The chancel arch is Norman in style, the south arcade is Early English, and the blocked north arcade is Perpendicular.	II*
Wetmoor Farmhouse; 52.86073°N 2.03093°W	—	Late 18th century	A brick farmhouse with a slate roof, two storeys and n attic, and three bays. The doorway has a segmental fanlight and a pediment, and the windows are sashes with plain lintels.	II
