= Boethus of Cilicia =

1st-century BC Greek poet and Roman governor of Cilicia

Boethus of Cilicia (Ancient Greek: Βοηθός; fl. 1st century BC) was an Ancient Greek poet from Tarsus who was the author of an epigram in the Greek Anthology in praise of Pylades, a pantomime in the time of Augustus. describes him as a bad citizen and a bad poet, who gained the favour of Antony by some verses on the battle of Philippi, and was set by him over the gymnasium and public games in Tarsus. In this office he was guilty of peculation, but escaped punishment by flattering Antony. He was afterwards expelled from Tarsus by Athenodorus, with the approbation of Augustus.
