= Uttoxeter railway station =

Railway station in Staffordshire, England

Uttoxeter
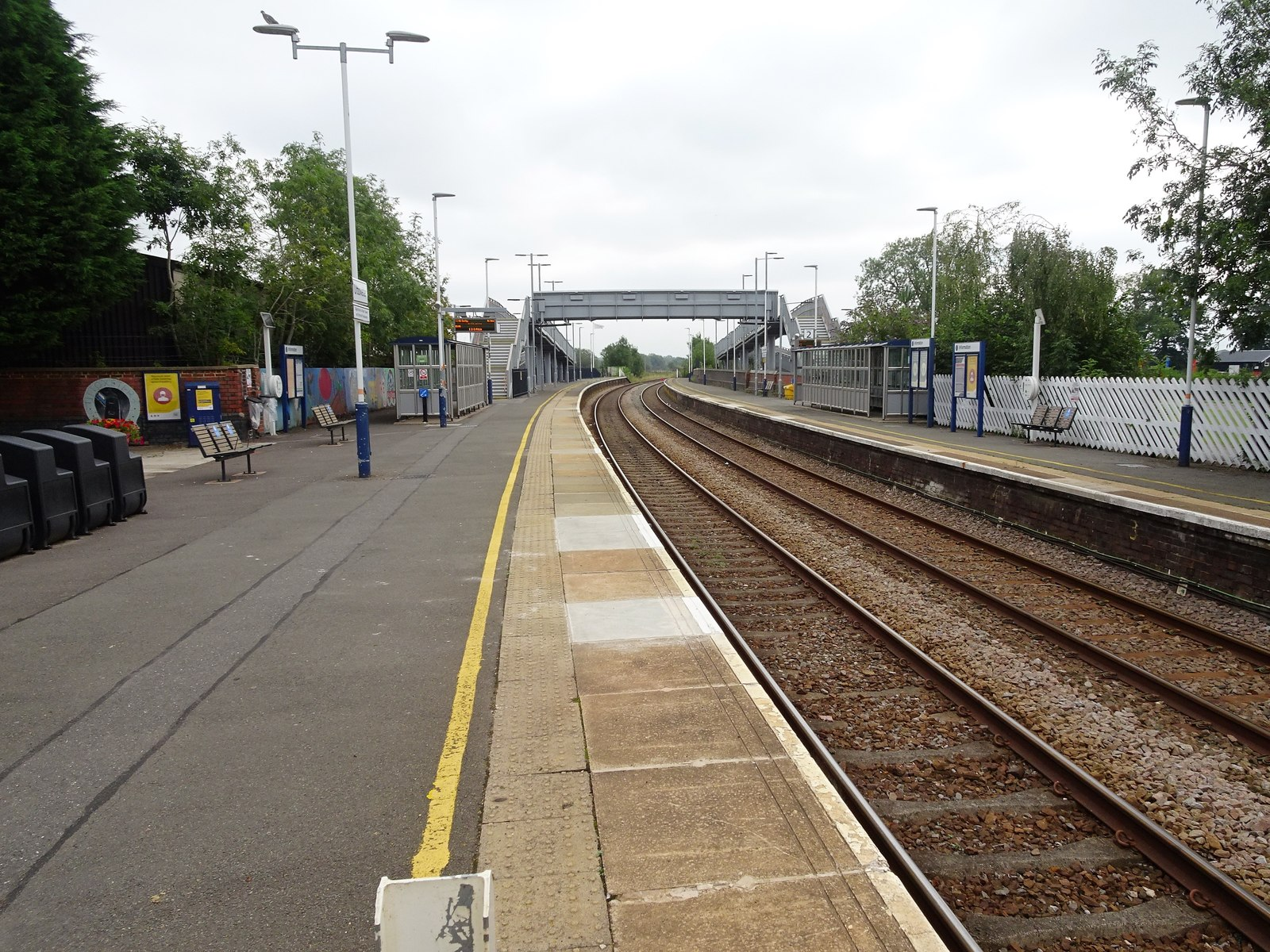
- Uttoxeter station (August 2020)

General information
- Location: Uttoxeter, East Staffordshire, England
- Coordinates: 52.8968°N 1.8575°W
- Grid reference: SK097332
- Manager: East Midlands Railway
- Platforms: 2

Other information
- Station code: UTT
- Classification: DfT category F1

History
- Pre-grouping: North Staffordshire Railway
- Post-grouping: London, Midland and Scottish Railway

Key dates
- 7 August 1848: Uttoxeter Bridge Street opened
- 13 July 1849: Uttoxeter Junction opened
- 13 July 1849: Uttoxeter Dove Bank opened
- 10 October 1881: Earlier stations closed; present station opened

Passengers
- 2021/22: ▲0.125 million
- 2022/23: ▲0.144 million
- 2023/24: ▲0.161 million
- 2024/25: ▲0.188 million
- 2025/26: ▲0.204 million
Location
Notes
- Passenger statistics from the Office of Rail and Road

Uttoxeter railway station (pronounced (listen)) serves the town of Uttoxeter, in Staffordshire, England. It lies on the Crewe–Derby line, which is also a community rail line known as the North Staffordshire line. The station is owned by Network Rail and managed by East Midlands Railway.

== History ==
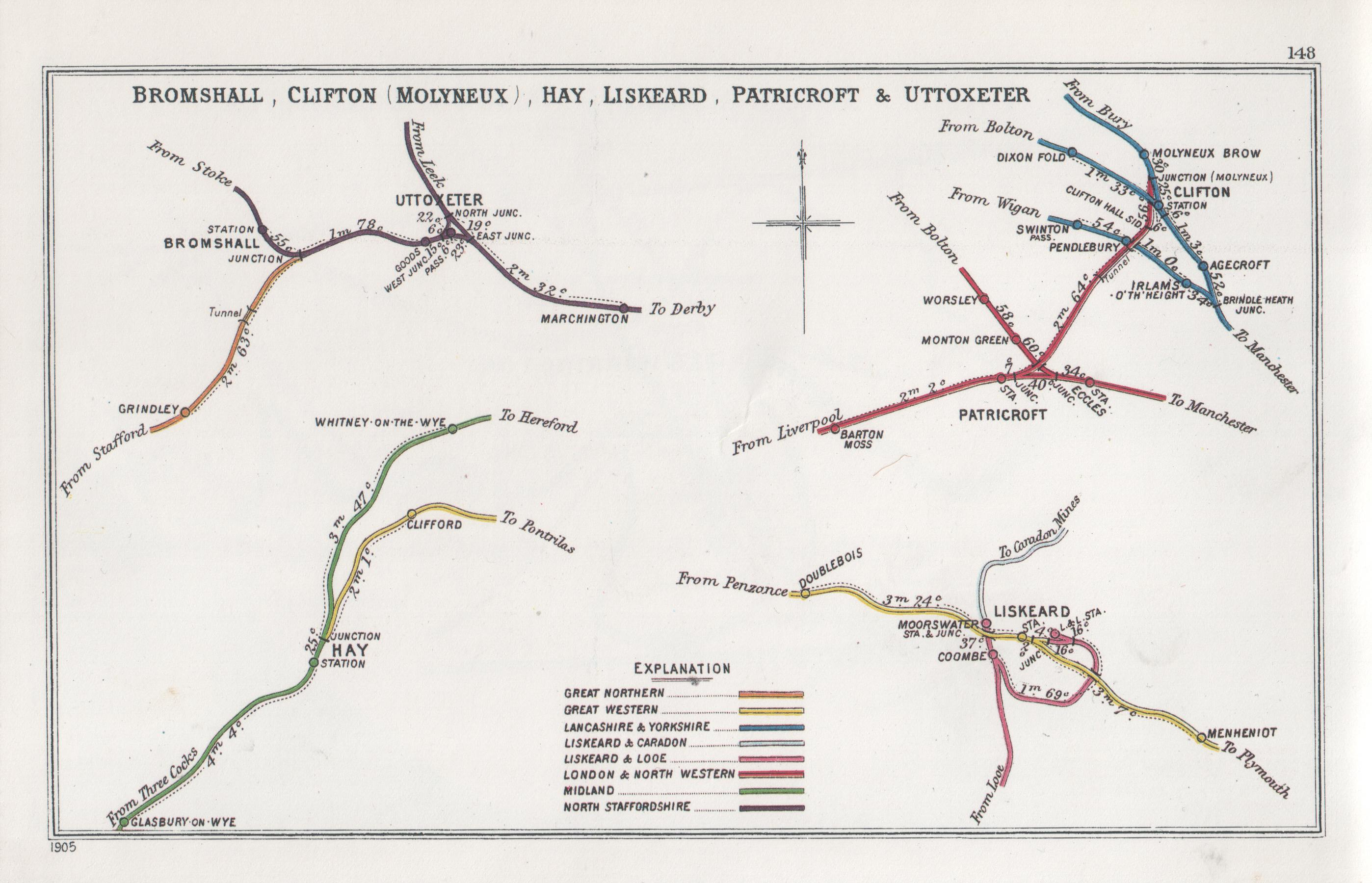
A 1905 Railway Clearing House junction diagram showing (upper left) railways in the vicinity of Uttoxeter

=== North Staffordshire Railway ===
Uttoxeter Bridge Street station was built by the North Staffordshire Railway (NSR) to serve its main line from Stoke-on-Trent to Derby; both the line and the station were opened on 7 August 1848. However, the station buildings were not completed on time and the crossing keeper's hut was used temporarily. The following month, on 11 September 1848, the line was completed through to Burton-on-Trent and through running between Stoke and Derby began.

The layout of stations in Uttoxeter, prior to 1881

When the Churnet Valley Line was opened on 13 July 1849, two additional stations were added: Uttoxeter Junction, which served both lines, and Uttoxeter Dove Bank on the Churnet Valley line.

In 1880, the NSR decided to close all three stations and construct a north-to-west line, forming a triangular junction; a new Uttoxeter station was opened on 10 October 1881 at this junction. There is a model of the 1881 station at the Uttoxeter Heritage Centre.

The Stafford and Uttoxeter Railway, which opened in 1867, also used the station but this line was operated by the Great Northern Railway.

=== London, Midland and Scottish Railway ===
On 1 January 1923, under the Railways Act 1921, the North Staffordshire Railway was absorbed by the London, Midland and Scottish Railway (LMS). During this period, the Stafford and Uttoxeter Railway, which had become part of the London and North Eastern Railway, closed to passengers on 4 December 1939, but the line remained open for goods traffic until 5 March 1951.

=== British Railways ===
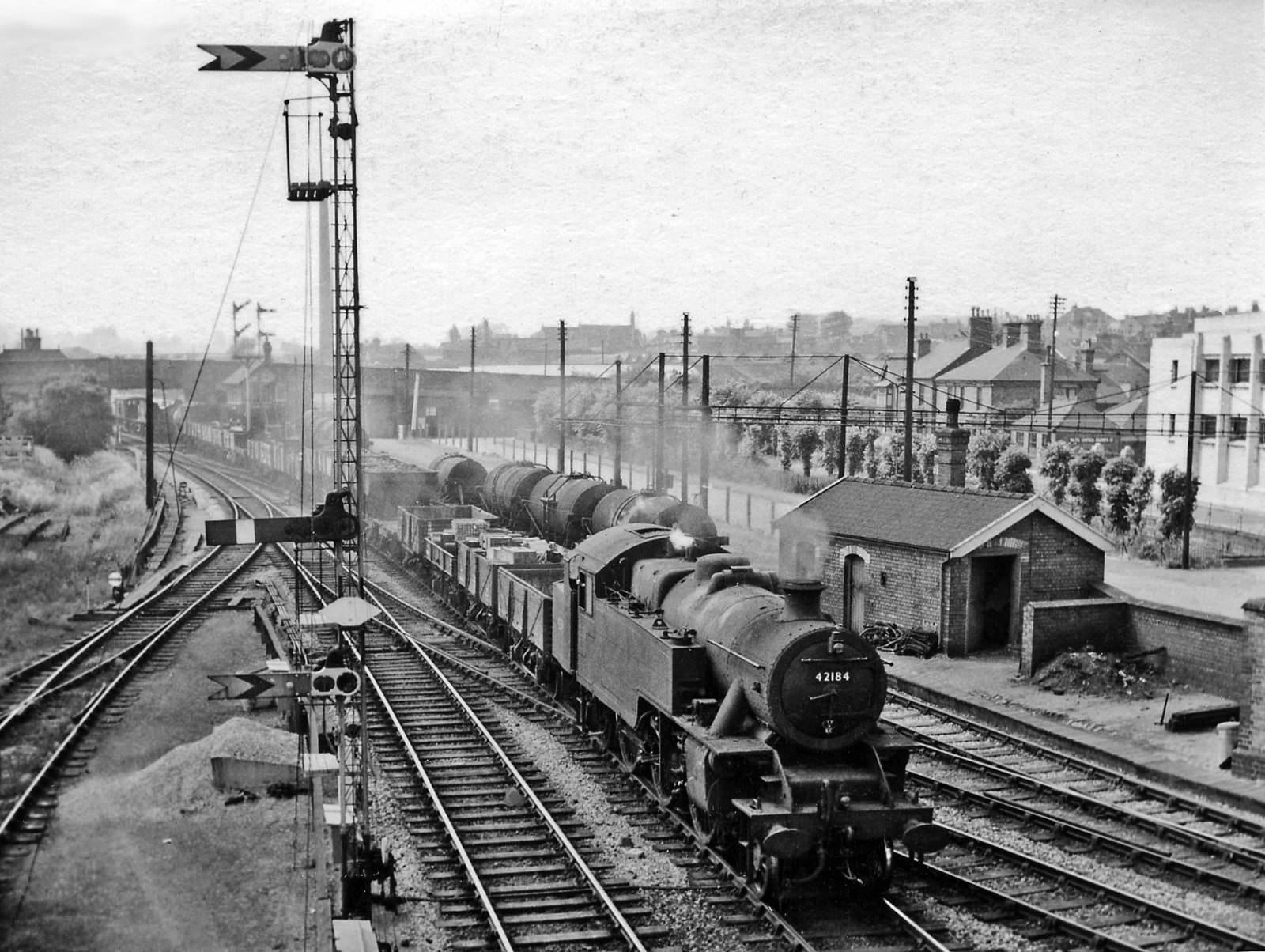
Local goods train entering Uttoxeter (1959)

The LMS was nationalised in 1948 and became part of British Railways.

The last main line steam train used the station on 16 September 1957 and, thereafter, an hourly diesel multiple unit service operated.

Passenger services on the Churnet Valley line from Uttoxeter towards Leek and Macclesfield ceased operation on 2 January 1965; the trains towards Ashbourne and Buxton ceased on 1 November 1954. The last main line steam train ran on 16 September 1957 and the engine sheds closed on 7 December 1964; a siding, which was part of the old Churnet Valley line, remained until the 1980s.

The station buildings were destroyed by fire on 9 May 1987.

=== Privatisation ===
On 2 March 1997, the station became part of the Central Trains franchise. Trains would run from the station to Manchester Airport and Skegness. In 2004, the Manchester Airport train was cut back to Crewe and, in September 2005, the Skegness train was cut short to Derby.

The Central Trains franchise expired on 11 November 2007; the station and its services were taken over by East Midlands Trains. When this franchise expired in August 2019, East Midlands Railway began operations; in May 2021, services were once again extended past Derby to provide Uttoxeter with a direct link to Long Eaton, Nottingham and Newark Castle.

== Facilities ==
The station is unstaffed and facilities are limited. There is a shelter on each platform, with modern help points and bicycle storage. A ticket machine was installed in 2021. There is a car park at the station and a taxi rank nearby. Step-free access is available to both platforms.

It is the closest station to Alton Towers, to which it is linked by an infrequent bus service. There is also direct access to Uttoxeter Racecourse, which is adjacent to the station.

== Services ==
All services at Uttoxeter are operated by East Midlands Railway. On weekdays and Saturdays, the station hosts the following services, in trains per hour (tph):

- 1 tph westbound to Crewe, via Stoke-on-Trent
- 1 tph eastbound to Lincoln, via Derby and Nottingham.

In the late evenings, services terminate at Nottingham instead of Lincoln. On Sundays, the station is served by an hourly service between Crewe and Derby only although no trains operate before 14:00.

Preceding station	National Rail	Following station
Blythe Bridge	East Midlands Railway Crewe to Derby Line	Tutbury and Hatton
	Historical railways	
Bromshall Line open, station closed	North Staffordshire Railway Crewe to Derby Line	Marchington Line open, station closed
Rocester Line and station closed	North Staffordshire Railway Churnet Valley Line	Terminus
Grindley	Great Northern Railway Stafford and Uttoxeter Railway	Terminus

== Bus connections ==
On Mondays to Saturdays, the station is served by:

- First Potteries' Kingfisher route, which provides hourly connections to Hanley
- Diamond East Midlands' routes 402, 402A and 403 services to Burton-upon-Trent.
