= Listed buildings in Weston, Staffordshire =

Weston is a civil parish in the Borough of Stafford, Staffordshire, England. It contains four listed buildings that are recorded in the National Heritage List for England. Of these, two are at Grade II*, the middle of the three grades, and the others are at Grade II, the lowest grade. The parish contains the village of Weston and the surrounding countryside, and the listed buildings consist of a church and three houses.

== Key ==
Grade	Criteria
II*	Particularly important buildings of more than special interest
II	Buildings of national importance and special interest

== Buildings ==
Name and location	Photograph	Date	Notes	Grade
St Andrew's Church; 52.84150°N 2.03962°W		Early 13th century	The spire was added to the tower in the 1830s, and the church was restored in 1860 by George Gilbert Scott, who also added the north aisle, and by William Butterfield in 1872, who added the south aisle and the clerestory. The church is built in stone, the roof of the south aisle is in copper, and the rest of the roofs are tiled. The church consists of a nave with a clerestory, north and south aisles, a south porch, a chancel, a northeast vestry, and a west steeple. The steeple has an Early English tower with clasping buttresses, an internal southwest turret, a large west lancet window, arcading in the upper stage, a parapet, and a recessed spire with lucarnes.	II*
The Manor House; 52.84189°N 2.03776°W	—	Late Medieval (probable)	The house is partly timber framed and partly in painted brick, and it has a thatched roof. There are two storeys, and the outer bays are gabled, the left bay with plastered panels, and the right bay with brick infill. The windows are casements with leaded lights, in the centre range is a gabled porch with a tile roof, and above it is an eyebrow dormer. There are later extensions at the rear.	II
Weston Hall; 52.84060°N 2.05150°W		17th century	A country house in Jacobean style, it is built in stone and has tile roofs. There are two storeys, an attic and a basement, and a front of four bays, each with a coped gable. On the front are three three-storey canted bay windows, and a two-storey gabled porch. The windows are mullioned, and most also have transoms. The porch is approached by a double stairway.	II*
Abbeylands; 52.84068°N 2.03896°W	—	1858	A vicarage, later a private house, designed by George Gilbert Scott in Jacobean style, it is in sandstone, and has a tile roof with stone-coped gables, and two storeys. The features include mullioned windows with hood moulds, an oriel window on foliate corbels with an embattled parapet, gabled dormers, embattled bay windows, and a conservatory.	II
