= Stafford Common railway station =

Disused railway station in Staffordshire, England

Stafford Common
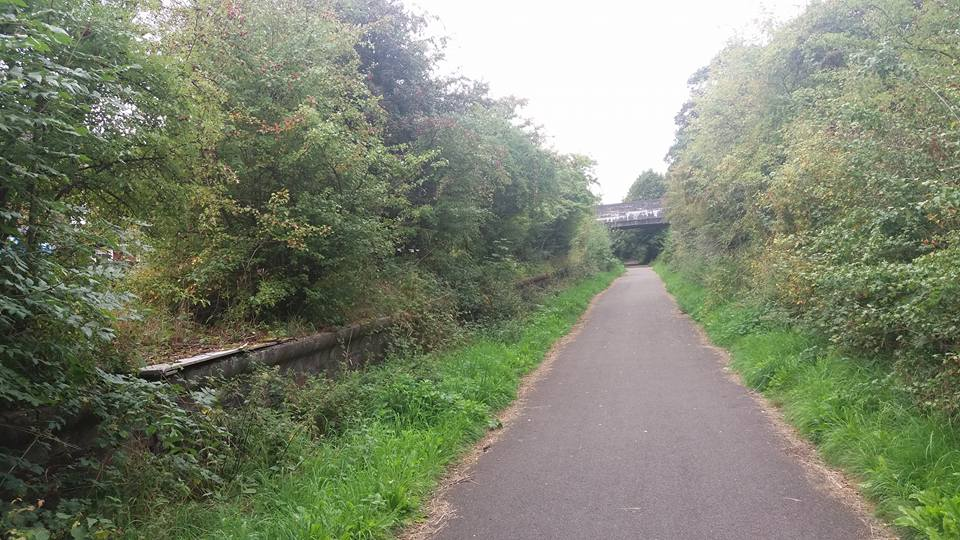
- Stafford Common station site (2017)

General information
- Location: Stafford, Borough of Stafford, England
- Coordinates: 52.8214°N 2.1169°W
- Grid reference: SJ922248
- Platforms: 2

Other information
- Status: Disused

History
- Original company: Stafford and Uttoxeter Railway
- Pre-grouping: Great Northern Railway
- Post-grouping: London and North Eastern Railway

Key dates
- 1874: Station opened
- 1882: Resited
- 4 December 1939: Station closed
Location

Stafford Common railway station served the northern outskirts of Stafford, in Staffordshire, England. It was a stop on the Stafford and Uttoxeter Railway between 1874 and 1939.

== History ==
The station was opened by the Stafford and Uttoxeter Railway in 1874, about seven years after the line opened. There was a single platform with a station master's office and waiting room, but it included a goods yard and an engine shed. It became the headquarters of the line, to reduce dependence on the London and North Western Railway at Stafford station.

The Stafford and Uttoxeter Railway was purchased for £100,000 by the Great Northern Railway (GNR) in July 1881 and the line passed subsequently into London and North Eastern Railway ownership on Grouping in 1923.

The original station was to the south-west of the Marston Road bridge (now Common Road). When the GNR doubled the line, the station was rebuilt on the other side of the bridge and bordering on Aston Terrace. It had two platforms and opened in 1882. The station buildings were on the bridge, timber throughout, with covered steps to the platforms where there were small shelters.

Passenger services finished in 1939, though it remained open as Stafford Common Air Ministry Sidings until 1952.

== Route ==
Preceding station	Disused railways	Following station
Stafford Line closed, station open	Great Northern Railway Stafford and Uttoxeter Railway	Salt and Sandon Line and station closed

== The site today ==
Both of the station's platforms remain in situ, albeit under vegetation. The line through the station has been converted into a rail trail, the Isabel Trail; it connects the A513 and the A5288, a short distance from Stafford station where the line originally joined the West Coast Main Line. A weekly Parkrun uses the trail.
