= Sandon railway station =

Former railway station in Staffordshire, England

Sandon
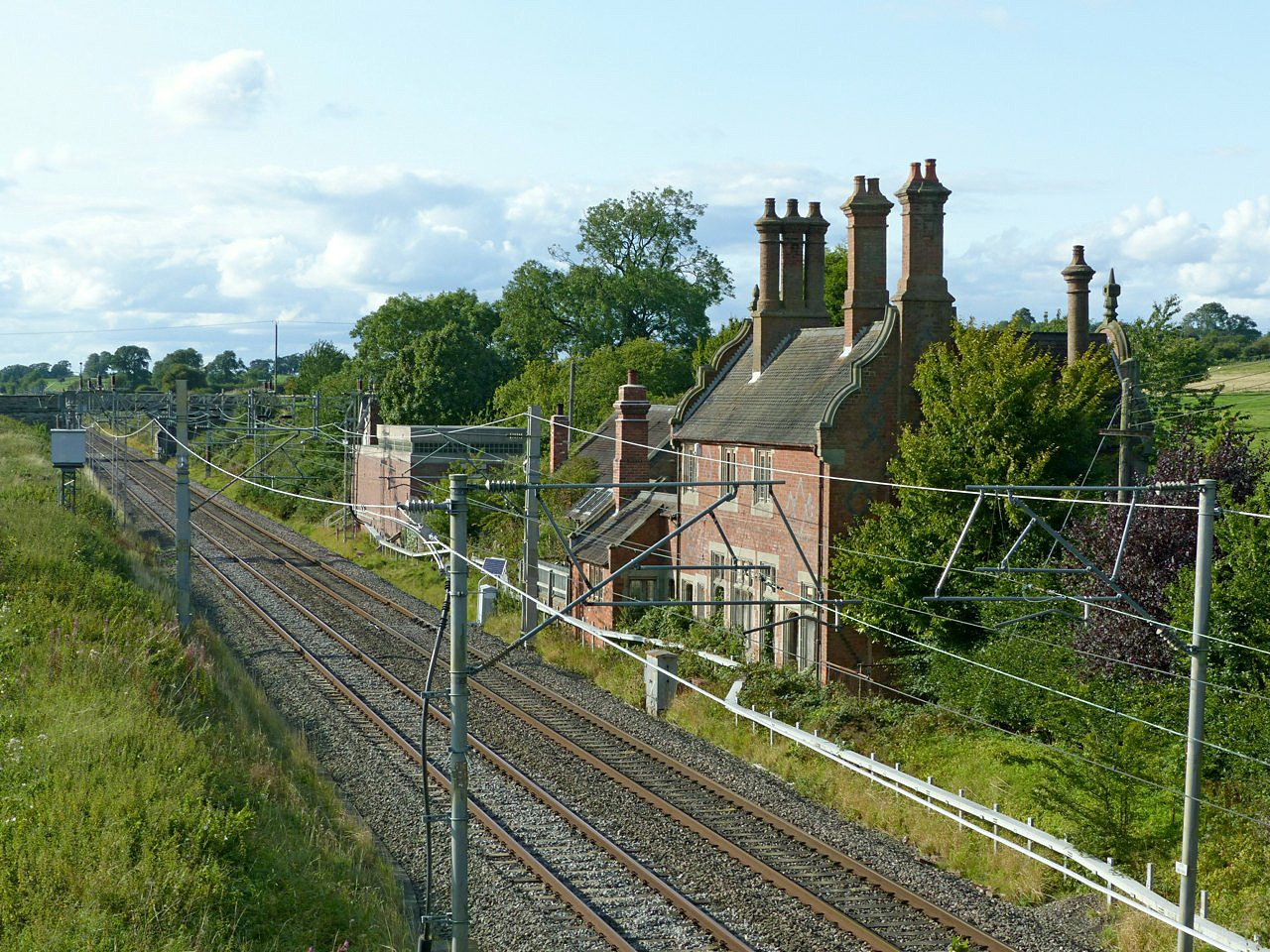

General information
- Location: Sandon, Stafford; England
- Coordinates: 52.8609°N 2.0809°W
- Grid reference: SJ946292
- Platforms: 2

Other information
- Status: Disused

History
- Original company: North Staffordshire Railway
- Post-grouping: London, Midland and Scottish Railway

Key dates
- 1 May 1849: station opened
- 6 January 1947: closed to passengers
- 5 September 1955: closed to goods
Location

Sandon railway station was a railway station opened by the North Staffordshire Railway to serve the village of Sandon, Staffordshire, England.

For some time it was called Sandon and Salt to avoid confusion with Salt and Sandon railway station opened by the Stafford and Uttoxeter Railway in 1867.

Although in a country area and in some distance from the village it served, the station building was in an ornate Jacobean style with ornate gable ends and, on the entrance side, a substantial Porte-cochère. This was for the convenience of Dudley Ryder, 2nd Earl of Harrowby, who was about to have a new Jacobethan country house built in nearby Sandon Park. There was a decorated timber awning and, on the opposite platform, a small but similarly elegant waiting-room.

The platforms and station buildings were built on the down, Stoke, side of the bridge of the present B5066 road, and at the other end was a long siding accessed from both running lines by trailing crossovers, with a short spur back to the station. To simplify shunting, authority had been given by the company managers to use a tow rope which was kept beneath the signal box. Further along the line was a private siding belonging to the Earl to service his gasworks which was also controlled by Sandon box.

It was a busy main line but few trains called at the station. Under the 1923 grouping it became part of the London Midland and Scottish Railway. By 1938 there were only two trains on weekdays and four on Saturdays. The LMS closed the station to passengers on 6 January 1947 and British Railways closed it to goods on 5 September 1955.

The station buildings gradually deteriorated until the Sandon Estate bought them in 1970. They were renovated in 1985 and are now a private home.

The line is still open as a diversion of the Trent Valley Line between Rugeley Trent Valley via Colwich Junction and Stone.

Preceding station	Historical railways	Following station
Aston-by-Stone Line open, station closed	North Staffordshire Railway Stone to Colwich Line	Weston and Ingestre Line open, station closed

== See also ==
- Listed buildings in Sandon and Burston
