= Grindley railway station =

Disused railway station in Staffordshire, England

Grindley
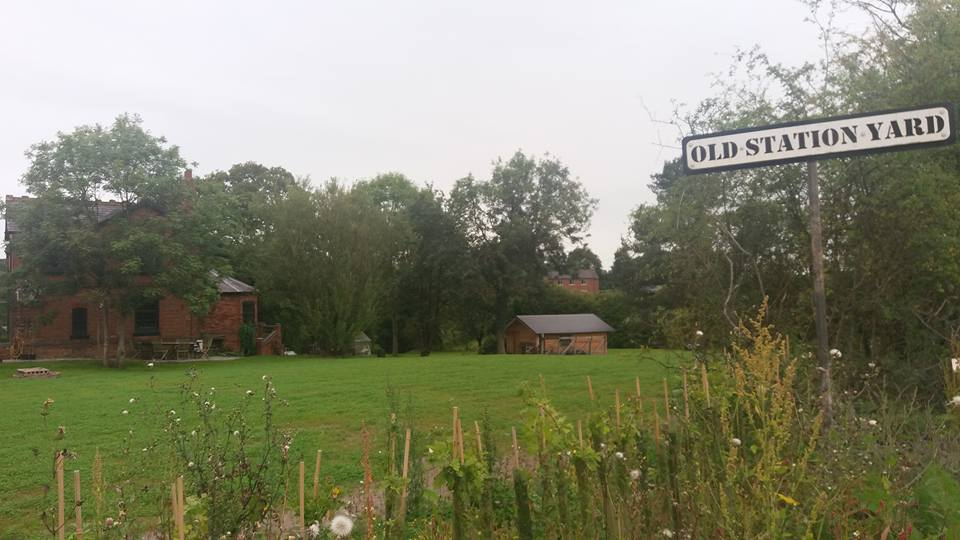
- Grindley station site and goods yard, now a private residence.

General information
- Location: South of Gratwich, East Staffordshire, England
- Coordinates: 52.8605°N 1.9447°W
- Grid reference: SK038292
- Platforms: 2

Other information
- Status: Disused

History
- Original company: Stafford and Uttoxeter Railway
- Pre-grouping: Great Northern Railway
- Post-grouping: London and North Eastern Railway

Key dates
- 23 December 1867: Station opened
- 4 December 1939: Station closed
Location

Grindley railway station served the village of Grindley, near Gratwich, in Staffordshire, England, between 1867 and 1939.

== History ==
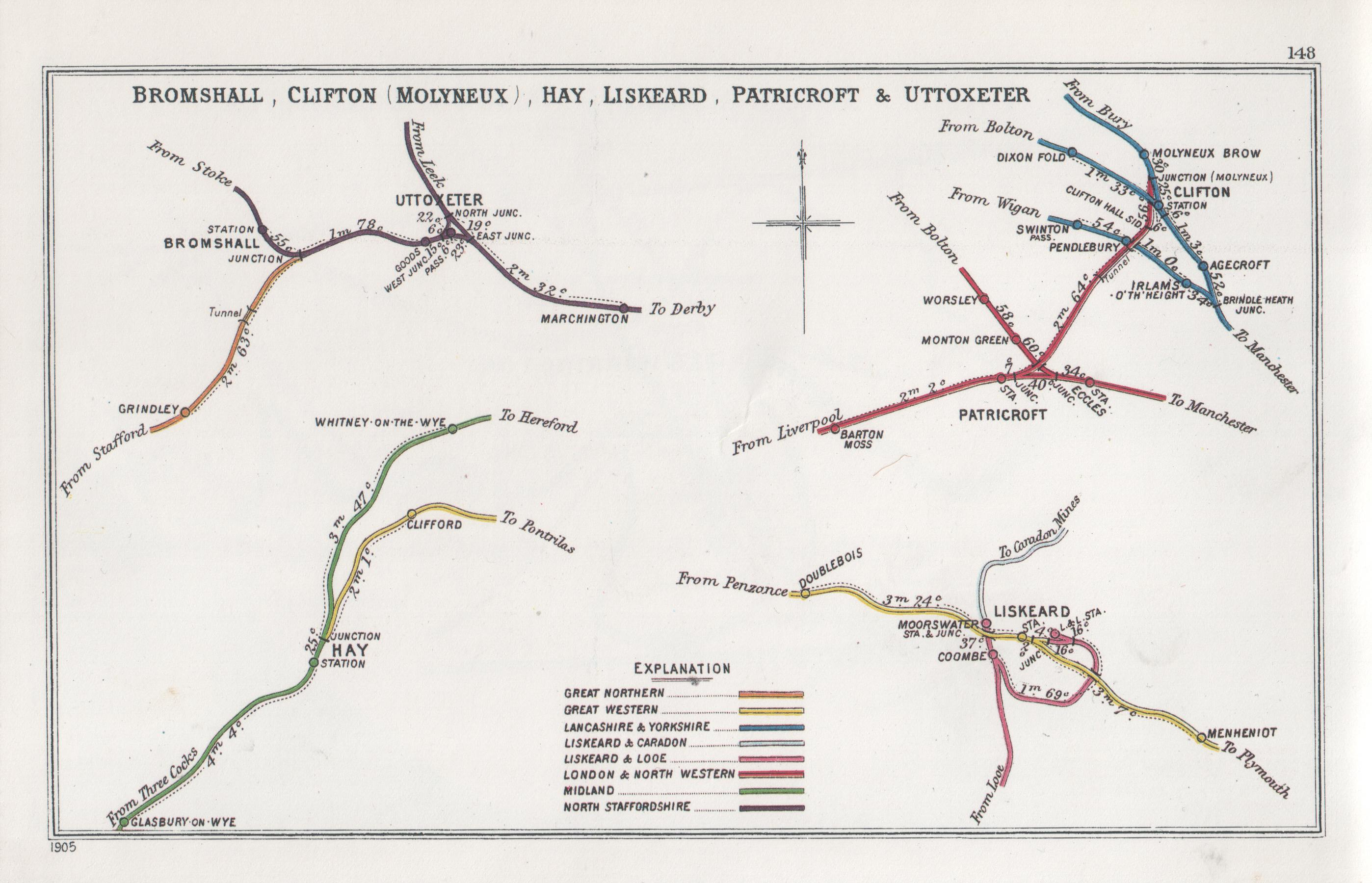
A 1905 Railway Clearing House junction diagram showing (upper left) railways in the vicinity of Grindley

The station was opened by the Stafford and Uttoxeter Railway in 1867. The Stafford and Uttoxeter Railway was purchased for £100,000 by the Great Northern Railway in July 1881 and the line passed subsequently into London and North Eastern Railway ownership on Railway Grouping in 1923.

Originally single line, a passing loop was added in 1887. Built in a cutting, the main station buildings were next to the road above, with the booking office on the main platform. Like most of the others on the line, the platforms were staggered, both accessible by cart tracks.

Two miles further north the single line entered Bromshall Tunnel before reaching its junction with North Staffordshire Railway line to Uttoxeter.

The station was closed in 1939.

Preceding station	Disused railways	Following station
Chartley Line and station closed	Great Northern Railway Stafford and Uttoxeter Railway	Uttoxeter Line closed, station open

== The site today ==
The Grindley station site and goods yard is now a private residence.
