= Sandown (ship) =

- Two vessels sailing in the 1790s have both borne the name Sandown. Only one appears in Lloyd's Register, and the apparent uniqueness of the name and the fact that the two vessels were sailing near Havana in 1794 has caused researchers possibly to conflate the two. Sandown is a seaside resort on the Isle of Wight, England.
  - Sandown (1786 ship) was foreign-built, and first appears in readily accessible records in 1786. A French privateer captured her in 1794 but the British Royal Navy recaptured her. A hurricane shortly thereafter drove her ashore and wrecked her.
  - Sandown (1788 ship) was built in France in 1781, purchased in England c.1788, conducted a notable slave trading voyage in 1793-1794, and is last listed in 1798.
- PS Sandown, a ferry operating between the Isle of Wight and the mainland between 1934 and 1966

== See also ==
- HMS Sandown, one of three vessels by that name that served the British Royal Navy
