= Chartley railway station =

Disused railway station in Staffordshire, England

Chartley
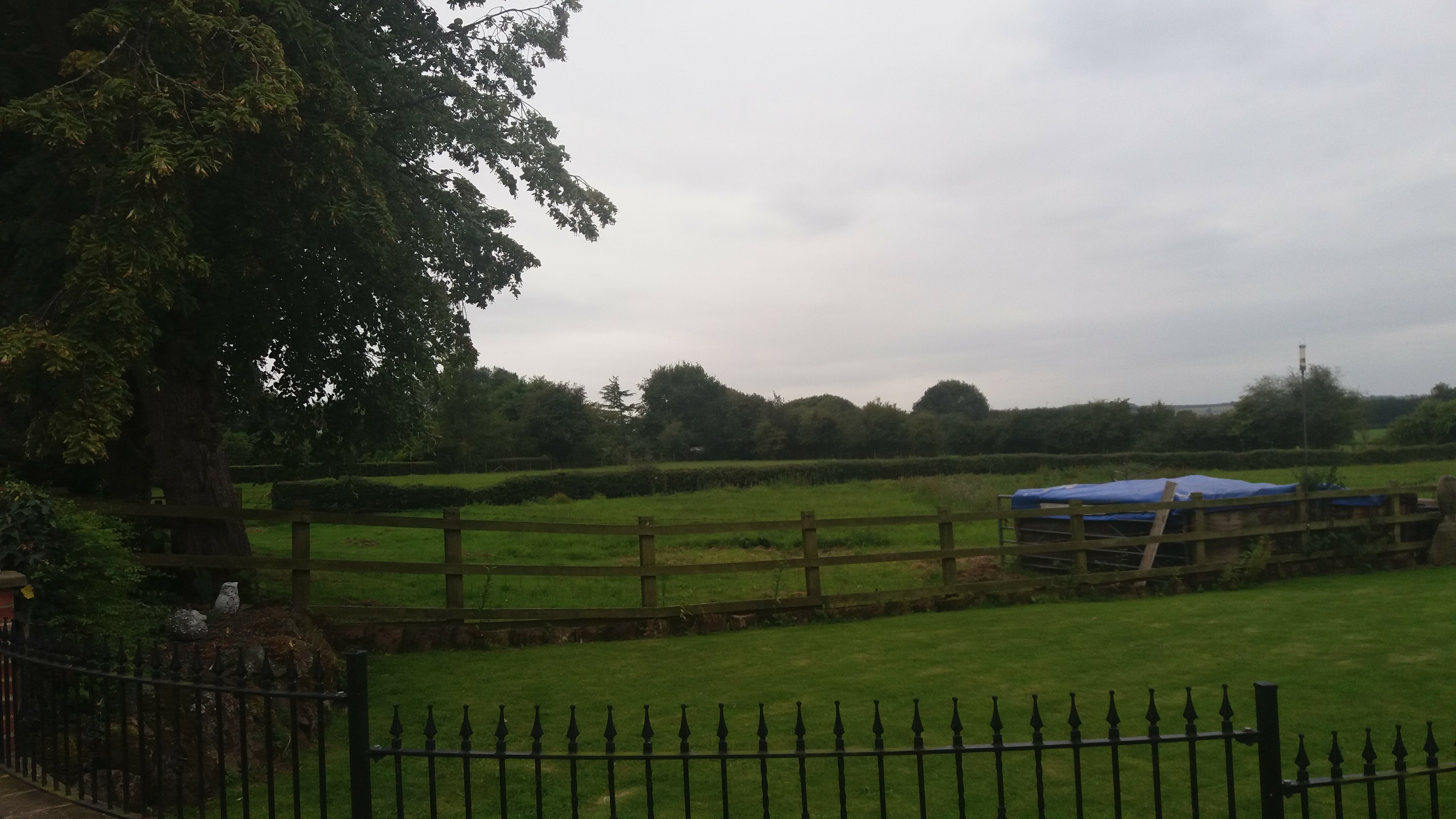
- Chartley station site (2017)

General information
- Location: Stowe-by-Chartley, Borough of Stafford, England
- Coordinates: 52.8465°N 1.9948°W
- Grid reference: SK004276
- Platforms: 2

Other information
- Status: Disused

History
- Original company: Stafford and Uttoxeter Railway
- Pre-grouping: Great Northern Railway
- Post-grouping: London and North Eastern Railway

Key dates
- 23 December 1867: Station opened as Stowe
- 3 October 1874: Renamed Chartley
- 4 December 1939: Station closed
Location

Chartley railway station served the village of Stowe-by-Chartley, in Staffordshire, England, between 1867 and 1939.

== History ==
The station was opened by the Stafford and Uttoxeter Railway in 1867. Originally named after the village of Stowe in 1874, it was renamed Chartley and Stowe in deference to nearby Chartley Hall, the residence of Earl Ferrers.

The Stafford and Uttoxeter Railway was purchased for £100,000 by the Great Northern Railway (GNR) in July 1881; the line subsequently passed into London and North Eastern Railway ownership, following Railway Grouping in 1923.

Passenger services ended in 1939 and the station was closed.

Preceding station	Disused railways	Following station
Ingestre Line and station closed	Great Northern Railway Stafford and Uttoxeter Railway	Grindley Line and station closed

=== Accident ===
A special train had been provided for the Meynell Hunt on 30 March 1882; it left Derby Friargate with four horseboxes from the GNR and the Manchester, Sheffield & Lincolnshire Railway, plus three passenger carriages. At Sudbury, six North Staffordshire horseboxes were added after the first coach, which was behind the engine. Thus only one vehicle was continuously braked.

Although the driver was using care in approaching stations, he was being piloted by the fireman who knew the line, but not that the passing loop at Chartley had just been brought into use. The train approached Chartley at 30 to 35 miles an hour and the leading coach became derailed. This caused the horseboxes to strike the timber platform, causing severe damage and several horses were killed or injured; none of the passengers or crew were hurt.

The inspecting officer for the Board of Trade recommended that, in future, the facing points for all passing loops should be straight, with the S curve at the trailing end.

== The site today ==
A shelter on one platform is the only building to survive to this day. During 2001, it was re-erected at a few miles away at Amerton light railway.
