= Stafford and Uttoxeter Railway =

Former railway line in Staffordshire, England (1867–1975)

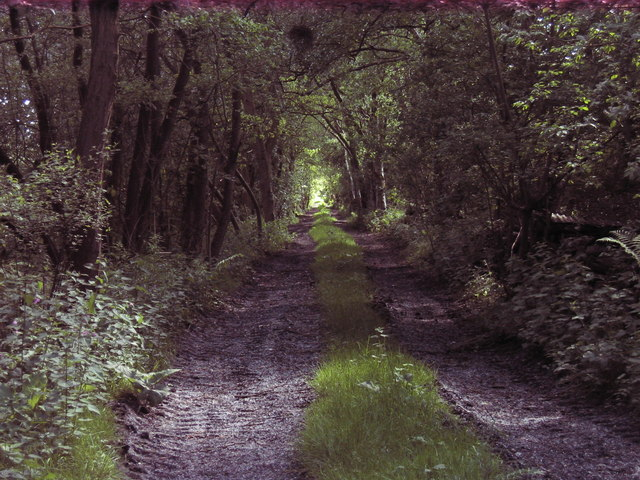
- The former trackbed at Stowe

Overview
- Status: Part rail trail, part disused
- Locale: Staffordshire, England
- Termini: Stafford, Uttoxeter
- Stations: 7

Service
- Type: Heavy rail
- System: North Staffordshire Railway

History
- Opened: 1867
- Closed: 1975

Technical
- Line length: 12.5 miles (20.1 km)
- Track gauge: 4 ft 8 1/2 in (1,435 mm) standard gauge

The Stafford and Uttoxeter Railway was a railway line that connected the towns of Stafford and Uttoxeter, in Staffordshire, England, between 1867 and 1975. Built primarily as a single-track railway, it served communities including Stafford Common, Ingestre, Chartley and Grindley.

The railway experienced financial difficulties during its early years and entered receivership in the 1870s. It was acquired by the Great Northern Railway in 1881 and subsequently became part of the London and North Eastern Railway.

== Early history ==
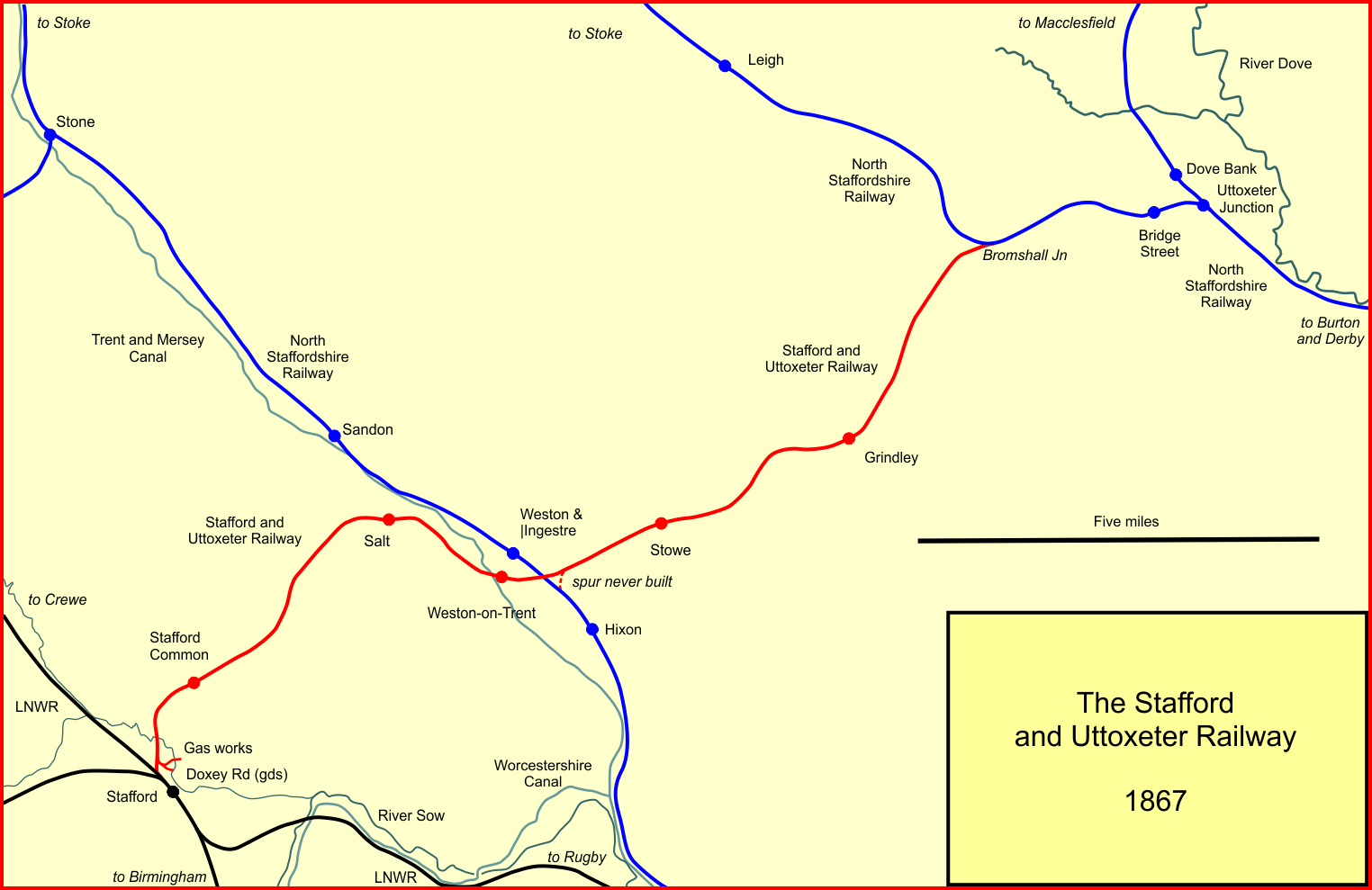
The Stafford & Uttoxeter Railway system in 1867

The line was authorised by an act of Parliament on 29 July 1862, to build a line between the towns.

It was opened for traffic on 23 December 1867. Construction cost had much exceeded estimates and income was poor, so that the company was always in financial difficulty. It was placed into receivership in 1875. The Great Northern Railway (GNR) had running powers to Uttoxeter and was persuaded to acquire the company, which it did in 1881. The GNR spent a considerable sum on improving the line, but it never made money and it was closed to passengers on 4 December 1939. Goods traffic ceased in 1951, except for a short stub to RAF Stafford; this too closed in 1975.

Prior to the establishment of railways, Stafford was an important manufacturing town; especially dominant was the footwear industry, supported by ancillary manufactures; in addition salt was extracted and, to a lesser extent, gypsum. Later, a number of heavy engineering works were established in the town The intervening land between Stafford and Uttoxeter was high quality grazing land, devoted to cattle farming. Uttoxeter itself had numerous smaller-scale manufacturing activities, but later became the home of J.C. Bamford; JCB was initially a large-scale maker of agricultural machinery, and later of construction and excavating machines.

On 4 July 1837, the Grand Junction Railway (GJR) opened, forming a north–south trunk link through Stafford. The London and North Western Railway (LNWR) was formed on 16 July 1846, consolidating the GJR with other trunk lines, connecting London, Manchester and Liverpool.

The North Staffordshire Railway (NSR) was incorporated in 1845, its scope being amplified in 1846. It was a compact and dense system centred on Stoke-on-Trent. In 1848, the line between Stoke-on-Trent, Uttoxeter and Burton-on-Trent was opened; in the following year, the line from Macclesfield was opened. The two lines converged at Uttoxeter Junction.

Stafford and Uttoxeter were therefore well served by railway connections. Proposals began to be put forward for an east–west line across the intervening agricultural terrain; after a number of unfulfilled projects, ideas for a Stafford and Uttoxeter Railway began to take shape. In support of the line were the interests of the growing shoe-making industry in Stafford and the Leighton Ironworks in Uttoxeter, of the Bamford family.

== Authorisation and construction ==
Stafford and Uttoxeter Railway Act 1862
- Act of Parliament
- Parliament of the United Kingdom
- Long title: An Act for making a Railway from Stafford in the County of Stafford to Uttoxeter in the same County; and for other Purposes.
- Citation: 25 & 26 Vict. c. clxxv

Dates
- Royal assent: 29 July 1862

Text of statute as originally enacted

A public meeting took place in Stafford on 31 March 1862 to confirm interest in a railway connecting Stafford and Uttoxeter; general approval was expressed, and it was resolved to progress the proposal. (Note: Baker and Miller imply (p27) that this was a meeting to gauge interest in forming a company; but the bill went to the 1862 session, and the project details must have been prepared at least a year previously.)

A parliamentary bill went forward to the 1862 session. Support had come initially from the Shropshire Union Railway, for transport of cattle from Wales; however, when the SUR was taken over by the LNWR, this was withdrawn. The line was fiercely opposed by the LNWR and the NSR, and the parliamentary process was difficult, although royal assent was given to the Stafford and Uttoxeter Railway Act 1862 (25 & 26 Vict. c. clxxv) for the formation of the company on 29 July 1862.

The line was to be single tracked, 12 1/2 miles (20.1 km) long, from Bromshall (Note: The railway always referred to the locality as Bromshall. In medieval times, that spelling was used locally, but Bramshall is now used in the community.) on the NSR near Uttoxeter, to Stafford. At Bromshall Junction, there were to be running powers over the NSR into Uttoxeter. The engineer was Thomas Charles Townsend. The authorisation included a spur connection to the NSR near Weston-on-Trent, but this was never built. (Note: The earthworks for the spur were made, but track was never laid. The earthworks are no longer discernible in satellite imagery. Christiansen and Miller say (p.152) that this was an almost 2 mi (3.2 km) branch forming a north to east spur, but this is a mistake. It was a short south-to-east spur.)

Stafford and Uttoxeter Railway Act 1865
- Act of Parliament
- Parliament of the United Kingdom
- Long title: An Act to grant further Powers to the Stafford and Uttoxeter Railway Company.
- Citation: 28 & 29 Vict. c. xlv

Dates
- Royal assent: 26 May 1865

William Field was appointed as contractor for the construction, which was put in hand almost immediately. However, construction of the considerable earthworks and a tunnel pushed the cost of the works above the engineering estimate, in addition to high land acquisition costs. In 1865, the company had to return to Parliament for authorisation of additional share capital to the extent of a further £50,000, granted by the Stafford and Uttoxeter Railway Act 1865 (28 & 29 Vict. c. xlv).

Colonel Yolland of the Board of Trade inspected the line on 23 May 1867, but found a number of deficiencies. Chief among these were the quality of the rail chairs, which he considered were too light; in addition holding-down bolts for longitudinal timbers on underbridges were to be improved. The method of working the line was not yet settled, and Yolland seems to have been irritated by this, making the unusual stipulation that tank locomotives must not be run bunker first on the line. A second platform was to be provided at Salt.

A reinspection took place on 25 September 1867 under Lt Col Hutchinson and, although not every detail had been rectified, he approved the opening of the line. The earthworks and bridges were constructed for double track, but single track was laid and the tunnel was single. There were some steep climbs, including one of over two miles (3.2 km) at 1 in 70 (14.3‰). Evidently arrangements to work the line had not been concluded; both the LNWR and the NSR had declined to work the line, and the S&YR had no locomotives of its own. Accordingly, there was a delay while working arrangements were negotiated.

== Operations ==
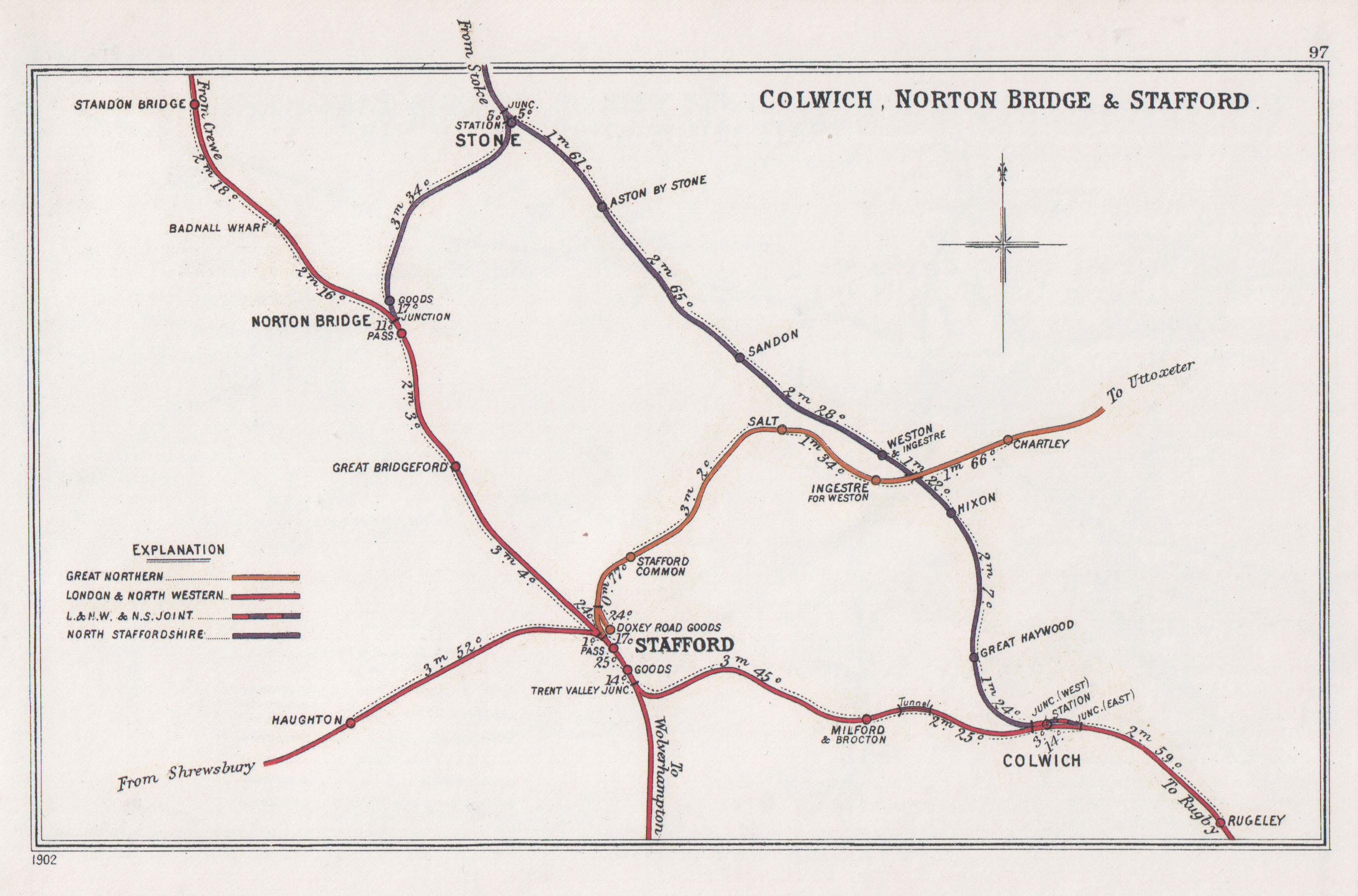
Railway junctions around Stafford

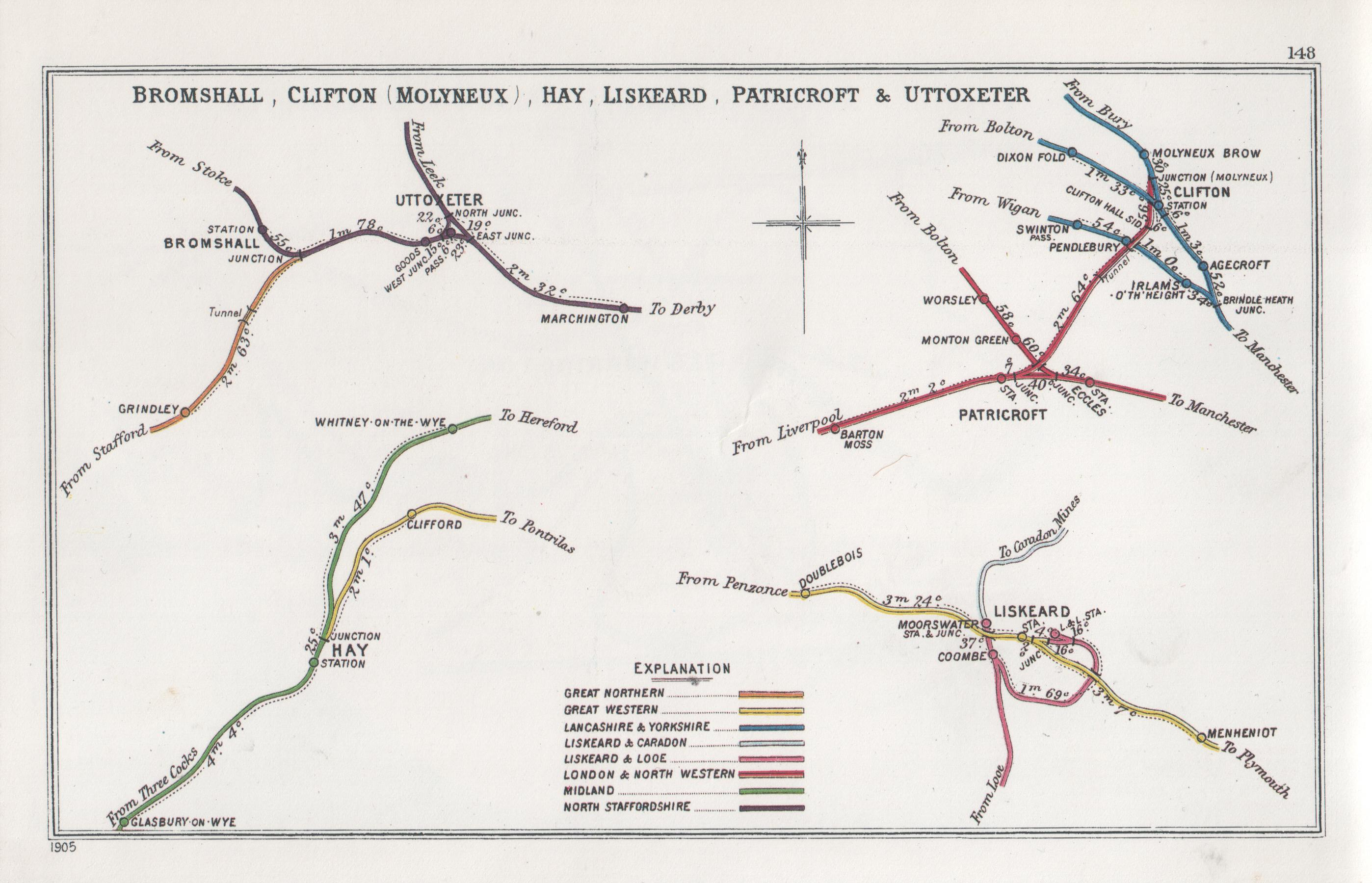

The line opened for general traffic on 23 December 1867. The company owned seven coaches, 16 wagons and one goods van but no locomotive initially. Motive power was probably provided by the contractor for the construction, who had become major shareholders in the company. (Note: Shares and debenture debt had been allocated to the contractor in lieu of cash payment, due to the company's desperate financial situation.) Instead of employing booking office staff, the company issued tickets on the train and there was little in the way of telegraphic or signalling equipment.

The first locomotive owned by the company was a 2-4-0 tank engine supplied in 1868 by Beyer, Peacock and Company and was named Shrewsbury and Talbot. (Note: The name refers to the manorial title of Charles Chetwynd-Talbot, the 19th Earl of Shrewsbury and 4th Earl Talbot.) A second locomotive, named Ingestre, was acquired second-hand in May 1873; It was a Beyer Peacock 0-4-2T. The purchase was probably prompted by the accident at Hopton Tunnel, in which Shrewsbury and Talbot was damaged.

By 1874, Stafford had expanded northwards and a new station was built at Stafford Common, where there were horseracing, fairs and agricultural shows. The line was never productive of much traffic and was not kept in very good order. In the summer of 1875, the Board of Trade sent Colonel Rich to report on its condition, and he required certain improvements to ensure safety. Losses and debts mounted, and a receiver was appointed in 1875.

Operationally, there was continuing opposition from the LNWR and the NSR. There were disputes over the maintenance of train connections at the junction stations, and over the handling of goods traffic. By 1878, it was clear that operating costs were exceeding traffic receipts and a receiver was appointed. The suggestion was made that, since it seemed likely that the LNWR and the NSR would continue to be uncooperative, approaches should be made to the Great Northern Railway or the Midland. The aim of connecting to Derby had still not been achieved. While the LNWR and NSR were on good terms with the Midland Railway and exercised running powers over its lines into Derby and Burton, the GNR had built a new line in competition with all three – its Derbyshire extension – and was anxious to penetrate further westward, to Wales if possible.

== Hopton Bank derailment ==
In 1873, there was a derailment at Hopton Bank. (Note: The location was spelt Hoopton in contemporary reports.) On 1 February 1873, the 12:10 train from Uttoxeter to Stafford derailed "at high speed" about two miles (3.2 km) before reaching Stafford. The driver and fireman were killed, and eight others were injured. The derailment took place on a right hand curve of 40 to 60 chains (2,600 to 4,000 ft; 800 to 1,210 m) radius, and on a falling gradient of 1 in 70 (14.3‰). There were some defects in the leaf springs of the locomotive, but these were not considered to be contributory. The main cause was stated to be excessive speed, associated with reaching Stafford to make a connection with a main line train there. The driver had previously been warned several times about excessive speed. Frost heave may have affected the stability of the track.

== Great Northern Railway ==
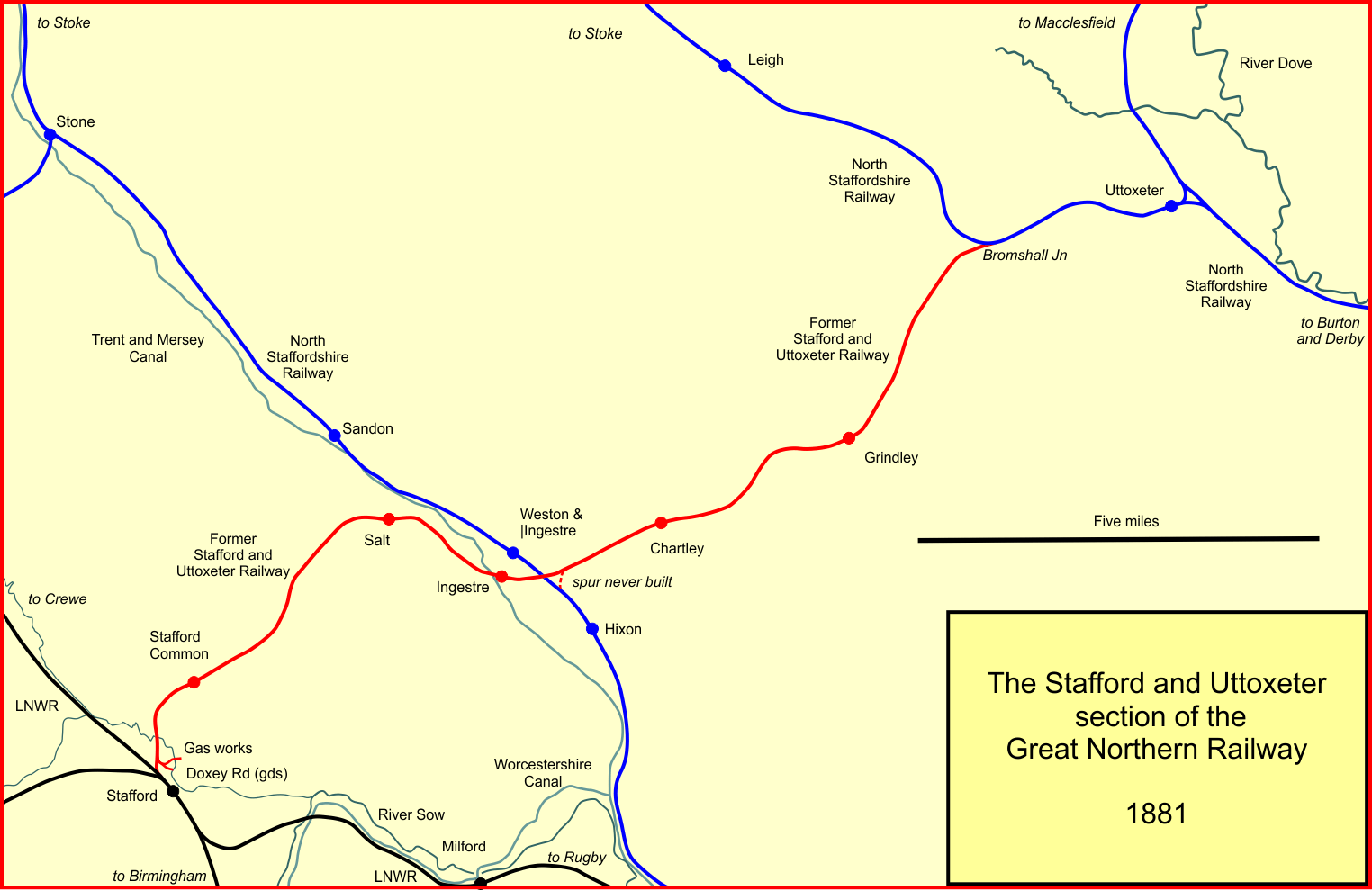
The Stafford & Uttoxeter Railway system in 1881

For three years, the S&UR company had been in receivership; its income was only £12 per mile (£7.46 per km) per week. In 1878, a representative of the major creditor approached the GNR, proposing that they should take over the working of the line. In that year, the GNR opened its Derbyshire and Staffordshire Extension Line from Nottingham London Road and Derby Friargate to Egginton Junction, on the NSR's Churnet Valley Extension line. The GNR had expressed an interest in reaching Holyhead and the S&UR might be a stepping stone in that direction.

Stafford and Uttoxeter Railway Act 1879
- Act of Parliament
- Parliament of the United Kingdom
- Long title: An Act to confer further powers on the Stafford and Uttoxeter Railway Company; and for other purposes.
- Citation: 42 & 43 Vict. c. cciii

Dates
- Royal assent: 11 August 1879

Text of statute as originally enacted

Great Northern Railway Act 1881
- Act of Parliament
- Parliament of the United Kingdom
- Long title: An Act to confer further powers upon the Great Northern Railway Company to enable them to acquire the Stafford and Uttoxeter Railway; and for other purposes.
- Citation: 44 & 45 Vict. c. clvi

Dates
- Royal assent: 18 July 1881

Text of statute as originally enacted

The GNR declined the approach but, in fact, negotiations continued regarding an outright purchase. The GNR were given running powers over the Stafford and Uttoxeter Railway by the Stafford and Uttoxeter Railway Act 1879 (42 & 43 Vict. c. cciii) of 11 August 1879, and into Stafford station. Further negotiations took place, and notwithstanding the poor state of the S&UR infrastructure, a price of £100,000 was agreed: the purchase was authorised by the Great Northern Railway Act 1881 (44 & 45 Vict. c. clvi) of 18 July 1881, effective from 1 August. Plant was transferred at a valuation of £1,450, which included two locomotives. If the GNR's interest in reaching Holyhead was definite, it was never realised and Stafford remained the westernmost outpost of the GNR.

Wrottesley is frank about the dubious value the GNR got for its outlays:

"Not very willingly, the GN came into possession of the Stafford & Uttoxeter. Other than as a possible western outlet for Derbyshire coal, the line offered little prospect of much revenue."

The advantage to the GNR was mitigated by a clause interested the act authorising the purchase, which prevented the GNR using the running powers over the NSR to divert traffic by any circuitous routes from the lines of the LNWR or North Staffordshire Companies.

At the time of the transfer to the GNR takeover, the line was completely run down, and the GNR invested £40,000 in improving the facilities at Stafford Common, providing passing loops at Ingestre and Chartley, and later at Grindley. Block signalling was installed. The GNR operated a through passenger service from Grantham to Stafford, via Nottingham and Derby; at around the end of the 19th century, Boston enginemen worked a lodging turn to Stoke.

The S&UR passenger train service had consisted of four trains daily between Stafford and Uttoxeter Junction, with five on Saturdays and none on Sundays. From November 1881, the GNR integrated these trains with its Derby services and six trains ran daily from Stafford to Derby, with one on Sundays. From 1900 to 1916, these were extended eastward to Grantham. There was a stationmaster and a staff of eleven at Stafford LNWR (Note: It is likely that many of the staff were employed at the goods depot.) until 1915; Stafford Common had its own stationmaster. The GNR set about considering what needed to be done to put its newly acquired line to rights. The goods station facilities available to the GNR at Stafford were poor; a new, more central goods depot was planned, to the north of the river Sow on a short branch line. It was authorised in the 1883 Parliamentary session and was called Doxey Road goods station. The gas works was connected to the same branch line in 1891; the LNWR was allowed to access it over the branch.

The line from Stafford Common into Stafford itself was doubled in 1882. In 1892, large salt deposits were discovered at Stafford Common which brought considerable mineral traffic to the line.

== Uttoxeter developments ==
The original layout at Uttoxeter had consisted of a southward junction. where the Churnet Valley line and the Stoke to Derby line converged; there was a junction station there, but it was an exchange passenger station only with no public access. There were two ordinary stations, Dove Bank (Note: To the north, on the Churnet Valley line.) and Bridge Street. (Note: To the east, towards Bromshall.) In 1881, the NSR provided a new west-to-north double track curve, completing a triangle. A new Uttoxeter station was provided at the western apex of the triangle and the other stations were closed.

== Early 20th century ==
During the First World War, cutbacks were made to passenger services and facilities. However, there was considerable freight movement westwards from the armament factories at Branston Depot and Chilwell Ordnance Depot. Royal Engineers personnel who had been trained at Longmoor Military Railway were drafted in to work parts of the line. In 1919, plans to extend the railway (particularly at Stafford Common) were announced, but they were not proceeded with after the announcement of the Railways Act 1921.

In 1923, the Grouping of the Railways of Great Britain took place pursuant to the Railways Act 1921; the GNR, owner of the S&UR line, was a constituent of the new London and North Eastern Railway (LNER). Through the 1920s and in early 1930, some enhancement to passenger receipts took place because of the popularity of inward excursions to places such as the village of Salt, through traffic to the racecourses at Uttoxeter and Doncaster, and to east coast seaside destinations.

== Decline and closure ==
In 1938, a bus service was introduced by the Green Bus Company between Stafford and Uttoxeter, leading to a fall in railway passenger numbers. With the outbreak of World War II, passenger services were reduced to one return train a day from 2 October 1939 and, on 4 December 1939, all civilian passenger services were suspended, as a means of dealing with staff shortages resulting from enlistment. Special trains ran to RAF Stafford, near Stafford Common station, and to a Royal Ordnance Factory at Bromshall.

After the war, civilian passenger and freight services briefly resumed. In 1948, the line became part of British Railways (Note: At first, it was used by the Eastern Region as a penetrating line, but was transferred to the London Midland Region after a year.) on the nationalisation of the British railway network.

On 5 March 1951, the line was closed to all through services except military traffic using the extensive sidings at RAF Stafford and to Stafford Common goods yard. Stafford Common goods yard closed in August 1968. On 28 November 1975, the final movement from RAF Stafford took place and the line was closed completely.

A special train organised by the Stephenson Locomotive Society became the last to travel the entire route, on 23 March 1957, except that Bramshall Junction had been removed. The train returned from just short of the junction to Stafford. Track from Hopton and Uttoxeter was lifted between 1957 and 1962. The railway bridge over the Trent and Mersey Canal at Weston was eventually removed in the 1990s; it had been used by a local farm to let dairy cattle cross the canal.

== Stations ==
Station name	Co-ordinates	Details
Stafford	52.80359°N 2.12307°W	LNWR station.
Stafford Common	52.8214°N 2.1169°W	Opened 1 July 1874; relocated from west to east of overbridge 1882; closed 4 December 1939; used by the RAF until December 1952.
Salt and Sandon	52.8472°N 2.0654°W	Opened 23 December 1867; closed 4 December 1939; the & Sandon suffix was used only in Railway Clearing House documentation.
Ingestre	52.8375°N 2.0348°W	Opened 23 December 1867 as Weston; renamed in 1870; closed 4 December 1939.
Chartley	52.8465°N 1.9948°W	Opened 23 December 1867 as Stowe; renamed 3 October 1874; trains ceased to be shown from start of LNER's emergency timetable on 2 October 1939.
Grindley	52.8605°N 1.9447°W	Opened 23 December 1867; closed 4 December 1939.
Uttoxeter	52.8968°N 1.8575°W	NSR station.

== The line today: Isabel Trail ==
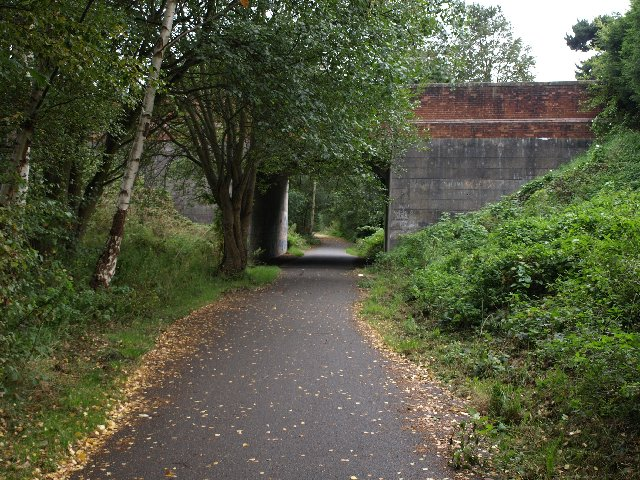
A road bridge carrying the A5013 over the trail

There is now no railway use of the former line.

A stretch of the alignment from Stafford town centre (Note: Location: 52.8086°N 2.1273°W.) to Beaconside (Note: Location: 52.8253°N 2.1057°W.) is now a 1.65 mi (2.66 km) shared-use path, the Isabel Trail. It is named after Lady Isabel Stafford.

Every Saturday morning, the trail hosts a 3.11 mi (5 km) Parkrun.
