= Salt and Sandon railway station =

Disused railway station in Staffordshire, England

Salt and Sandon
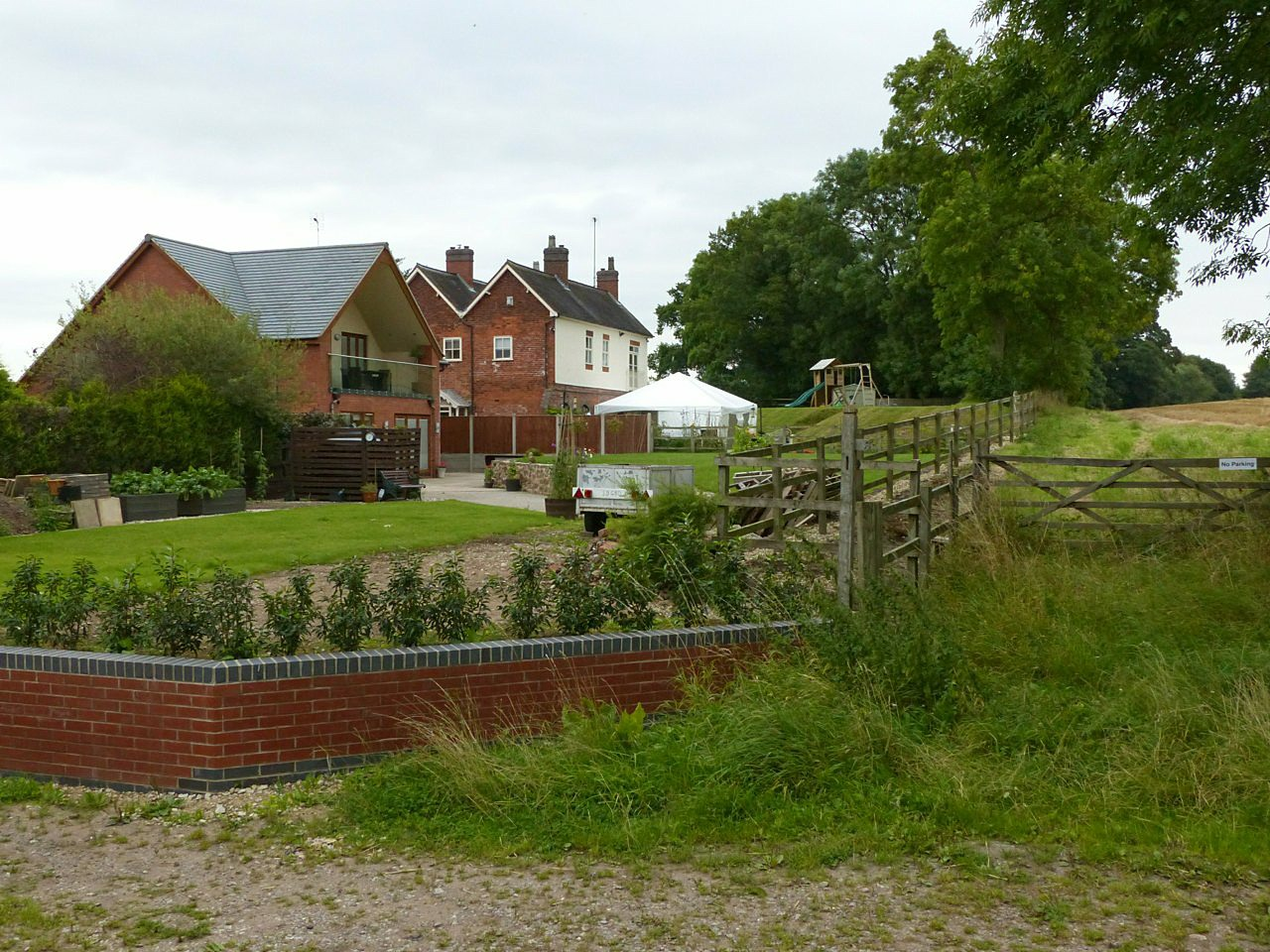
- The site of the station, now a private residence

General information
- Location: Salt, Borough of Stafford, England
- Coordinates: 52.8472°N 2.0654°W
- Grid reference: SJ956277
- Platforms: 2

Other information
- Status: Disused

History
- Original company: Stafford and Uttoxeter Railway
- Pre-grouping: Great Northern Railway
- Post-grouping: London and North Eastern Railway

Key dates
- 23 December 1867: Station opened
- 4 December 1939: Station closed
Location

Salt and Sandon railway station served the village of Salt, in Staffordshire, England, between 1867 and 1939.

== History ==
On its opening in 1867, the station was called Salt. It was renamed Salt and Sandon in 1904 to avoid confusion with Sandon and Salt station on the North Staffordshire Railway. Sandon was actually about two miles away; the station being nearer to Sandon Bank.

The Stafford and Uttoxeter Railway was purchased for £100,000 by the Great Northern Railway in July 1881 and the line subsequently passed into London and North Eastern Railway ownership with Railway Grouping in 1923.

From Salt, the line turned sharply south-east towards Ingestre, before passing over the North Staffordshire Railway's main line from Stone to Colwich.

Passenger services ended in 1939 and the station was closed.

Preceding station	Disused railways	Following station
Stafford Common Line and station closed	Great Northern Railway Stafford and Uttoxeter Railway	Ingestre Line and station closed

== The site today ==
The station building is now a private residence.
