= Sandon (philosopher) =

Sandon (Greek: Σάνδων; 1st century BC) is an Orphic philosopher mentioned in the Suda. He is described briefly as a son of Hellanikos. He has been identified with the Sandon of Tarsus mentioned by Pseudo-Lucian in the essay Macrobii ("Long Lives"), who was the father of Athenodorus (the Stoic philosopher and the tutor of Augustus Caesar). His father Hellanicus may have been the Orphic philosopher of the late 2nd century mentioned by Damascius.
