= HMS Sandown =

Three ships of the Royal Navy have been named HMS Sandown. Sandown is a seaside resort on the Isle of Wight, England.

- HMS Sandown (1916), one of 24 Racecourse-class paddle wheel minesweepers, and was launched in 1916 and broken up in 1923.
- HMS Sandown (1939), a paddle wheel ferry built in 1934 for Southern Railway's Portsmouth—Ryde service but requisitioned by the Royal Navy in 1939 and converted to a minesweeper, and later in 1942 to an anti-aircraft ship. She was converted back to a ferry in 1945 and was scrapped in 1956.
- HMS Sandown (M101) was a Sandown-class minehunter launched in 1988 and transferred to the Estonian Navy in 2007 as EML Admiral Cowan.

== Battle honours ==
Ships named Sandown have earned the following battle honours:

- Dunkirk 1940
- Normandy 1944
- Al Faw 2003
