= Weston, Staffordshire =

Village in Staffordshire, England

Coordinates: 52.8417°N 2.03536°W

Weston
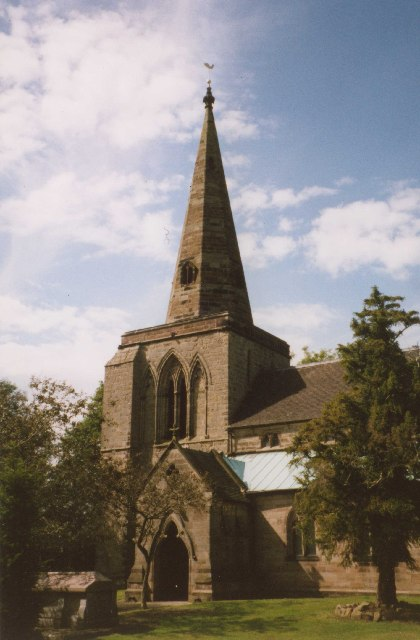
- The Parish Church of Saint Andrew

- Location within Staffordshire
- Population: 965
- District: Stafford
- Shire county: Staffordshire
- Region: West Midlands
- Country: England
- Sovereign state: United Kingdom
- Post town: STAFFORD
- Postcode district: ST18
- Dialling code: 01889
- Police: Staffordshire
- Fire: Staffordshire
- Ambulance: West Midlands

Weston is a village and civil parish. within the English county of Staffordshire. The parish is in the local authority of Stafford (non-metropolitan district).

== Location ==
The village is 4.6 miles (7.4 km) north east of the town of Stafford, and 9.5 miles (15.3 km) south west of Uttoxeter. The village of Gayton is 1.5 miles (2.4 km) to the north east. The nearest railway station is at Stafford. The nearest main roads are the A51. which skirts the north eastern boundary of the village. Chaserider bus service 841 links the village to Stafford and Uttoxeter, and D&G service X14 to Alton Towers during park season.

== Population ==
The 2011 census recorded a population of 965 in 422 Households. The parish comes under the Stafford Non-Metropolitan District.

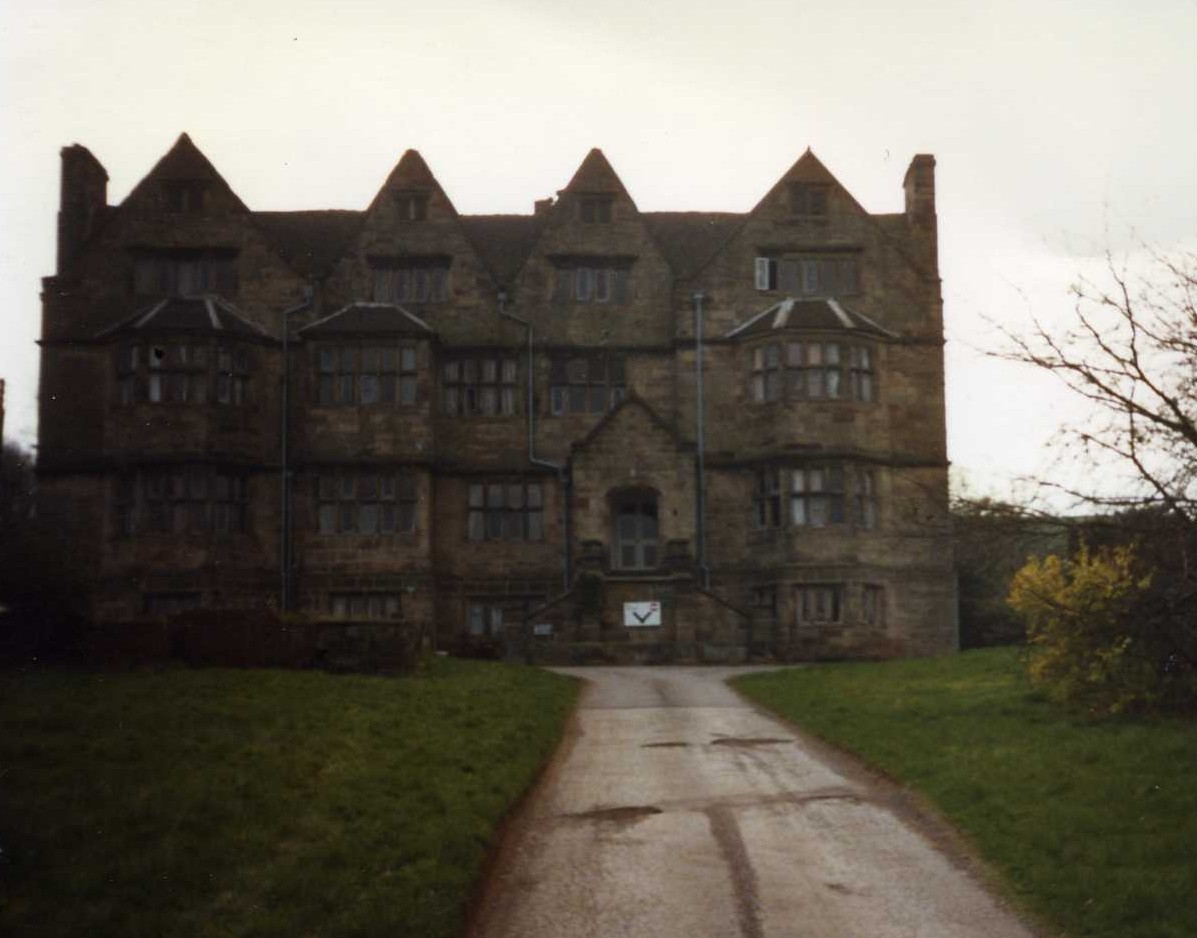
Weston Hall, April 1988

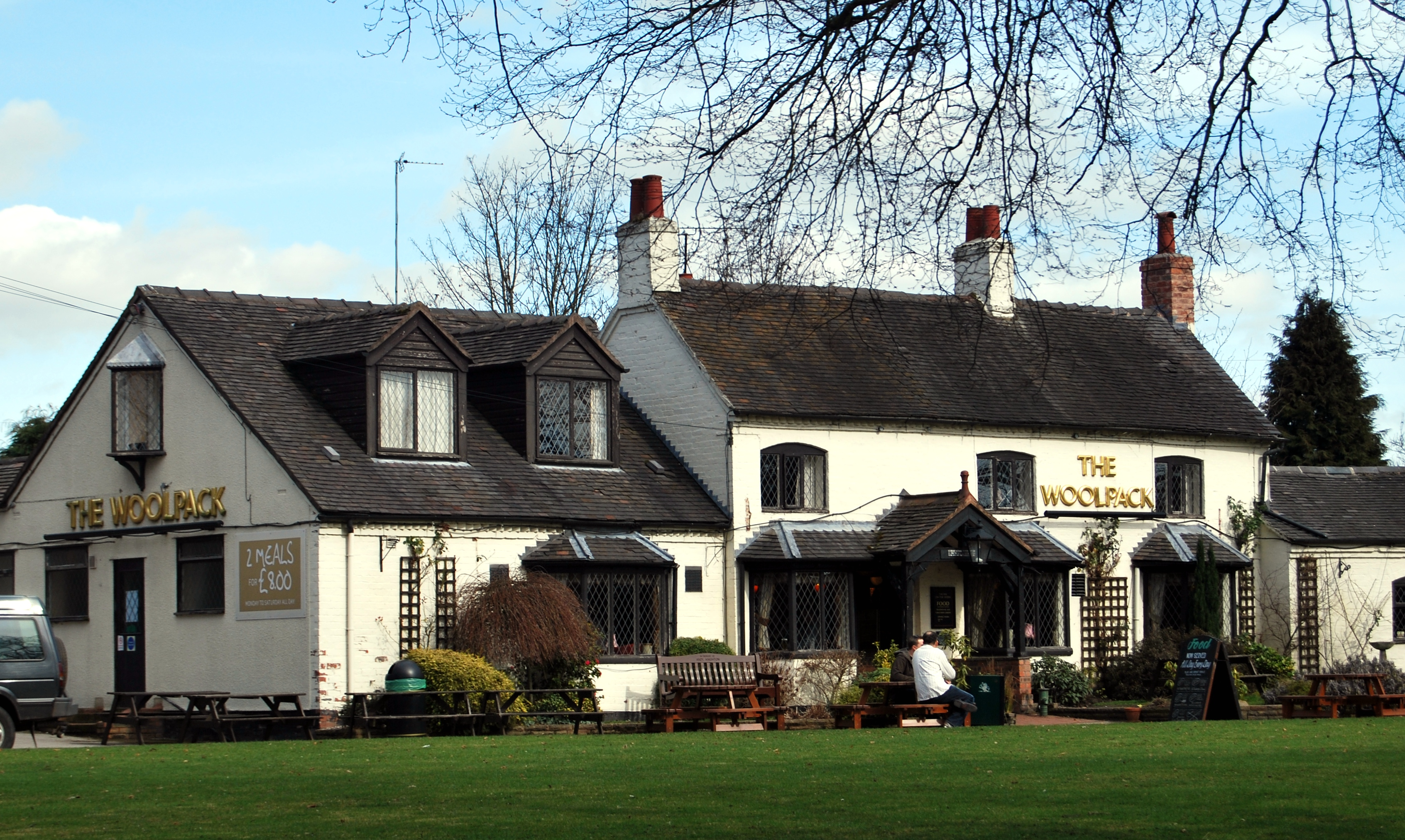
The Woolpack Weston

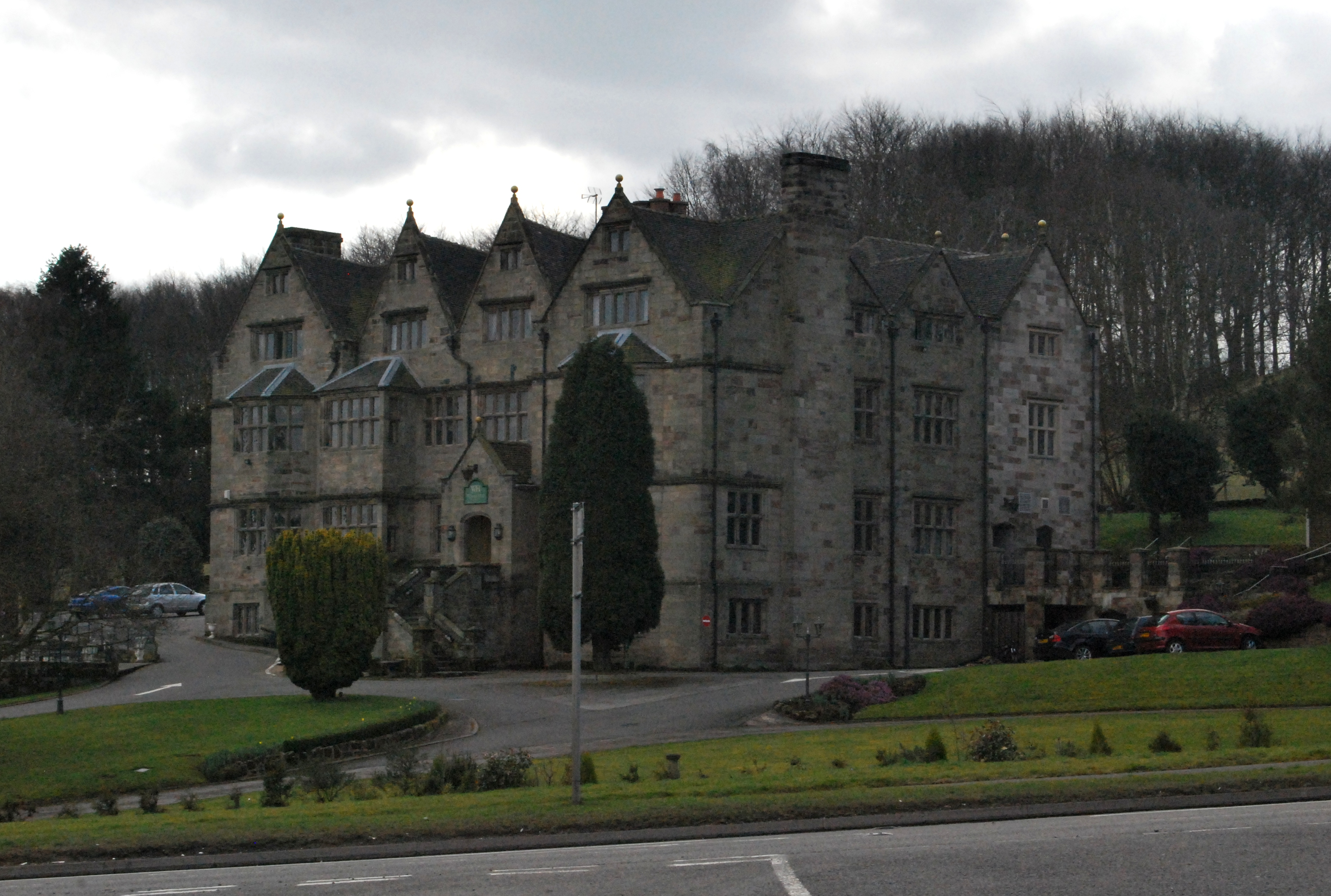
Weston Hall, March 2010

== History ==
The ancient village and parish of Weston was a forest clearing on the outskirts and was part of the Chartley Estate which was sold off in 1904. The high ground meant that the surrounding land was well drained with a good water supply from the nearby River Trent. This small settlement was also located at the intersection of the London - Lichfield - Chester road and the Shrewsbury - Stafford - Derby road (the current A51 and A518 respectively). The road from Stafford originally forded the Trent. In the late 18th Century a flood washed away the bridge there. It was later replaced by a single arch stone bridge in the 19th century. Weston was a centre of salt production in the 19th century, with saltworks both in the village and at the nearby hamlet of Shirleywich.

=== Domesday Book ===
Weston on Trent is mentioned in the Domesday Book of 1086. In the survey the village is recorded as being as the holding of one of King William's thegn's named Sperri, having previously being held by a Saxon named Wulfhelm. Assets of the village were listed as half a virgāta of land. Land for one plough, one villager or villein, 3 acres of meadows. There was one Household in the village and the amount of tax per household was calculated at one-eighth of one 'hide'. The gross taxable value of the village was calculated at 0.1 geld units, with a Value to lord of the manor in 1086 of £0.1.

=== Saint Andrew's Parish Church ===
The Parish Church of St. Andrews was restored by George Gilbert Scott in the 1860s and by William Butterfield in the 1870s. Butterfield's restoration revealed some of the original Norman work. The bell tower dates from the early 13th Century. The tower holds two bells; "Ave Maria" dating from 1402 and "Ann Shaw" dating from 1962. A third bell, "Katerina", dating from 1500, can be found cracked upon the floor. The church also houses a silver communion paten dating from the early 15th Century. The Parish registers, kept by Staffordshire Record Office, date from 1581.

== Notable buildings and structures ==
In the village, the present thatched "Manor House", which has been used as a farm building in the past, dates from the 16th Century. In the mid 19th Century it was used as the national School and school keeper's cottage, then as a Wesleyan Methodist meeting house until the present Methodist Church was built at the start of the 20th Century along the main London - Chester road. The village hall is regularly used by local groups and hosts the monthly Weston & Gayton Parish Council meetings.

The Trent & Mersey Canal passes through the village.

== See also ==
- Listed buildings in Weston, Staffordshire
