= Miniature Pony Centre =

English farm tourist attraction

Coordinates: 50.649°N 3.816°W

The Miniature Pony Centre was a farm tourist attraction based in the Dartmoor National Park, near Moretonhampstead. In 2023, it permanently closed as a result of the cost of living crisis in the UK.

Originally, the land was owned by W.H. Smith of the retail chain. He was the first Lord Hambleden, and also owned Bovey Castle, formerly the Manor House.

The Miniature Pony Centre first opened to the public in 1986, when it was founded by Tony and Jane Dennis. The Dennises brought various breeds of equines to Dartmoor along with other farmyard animals. They founded the Kerswell stud in 1970 and they continued to breed their pedigree line of Kerswell ponies. The Miniature Shetland Ponies were bred at The Miniature Pony Centre under the Keensacre and Bottriell stud names.

The Miniature Shetland Pony is a very small Shetland pony. Ponies under 34 inches in height are classed as Miniature Shetland, whilst 34 to 42 inches (8.2 to 10.2 hands) is called a standard Shetland. The centre also bred Miniature Horses and Miniature Mediterranean donkeys. In 2020, the centre also welcomed its first pair of Miniature Pigs.

The centre was one of the original family farm attractions on Dartmoor National Park. In 2003, the centre was sold to new owners.
