= Sampson Erdeswicke =

English antiquary and chorographer

Sampson Erdeswicke (c. 1538 – 1603) was an English antiquary and chorographer.

== Background ==
Sampson's father, Hugh Erdeswicke claimed descent from Richard de Vernon, Baron of Shipbrook in the reign of William the Conqueror. The family resided originally at Erdeswicke Hall, Minshull Vernon, in Cheshire, afterwards at Leighton and finally in the reign of Edward III settled at Sandon in Staffordshire, at Sandon Hall (in its medieval form). Hugh Erdeswicke was a staunch Catholic; in 1582 he was reported to the Privy Council by the Bishop of Coventry as "the sorest and dangerousest papist, one of them in all England". He is said to have struck a justice of the peace on the pate with a crabtree staff openly in Sandon churchyard, possibly the same person whom he found upon some occasion ransacking his house.

== Life ==
Sampson was born at Sandon Hall around 1538, and he and entered Brasenose College, Oxford as a gentleman-commoner in 1553. Leaving Oxford, he returned to his life as a country gentleman under the disadvantages of being a recusant.

He devoted himself to antiquarian studies, particularly to his county history, the thorough Survey of Staffordshire, by which he is now chiefly remembered. It was not published during his lifetime, but circulated in manuscript and was well known before its eventual publication. Considerable mystery exists as to the original manuscript, because the numerous existing copies differ much from one another. A description of these was published by William Salt, F.S.A., in 1844. The Survey itself was published by Simon Degge (1717 and 1723), by Stebbing Shaw in his History and Antiquities of Staffordshire (1798), and lastly by Thomas Harwood (1820 and 1844).

Other unpublished manuscripts by Erdeswicke are in the British Library and the College of Arms. Latterly he employed as amanuensis William Wyrley, a young man whom he had educated and who afterwards published writings of his own. One of these, The True Use of Armorie, was claimed by Erdeswicke as his own work, but (according to William Dugdale), he told William Burton the antiquary, that he had given Wyrley leave to publish it under his own name. Dugdale noted:

I was assured by Mr. William Burton of Lindley in Leicestershire that Mr. Erdswike did to him acknowledge, he was the Author of that Discourse, though he gave leave to Mr. Wyrley (who had been bred up under him) to publish it in his own name. This Mr. Erdswike from publick Records and antient Evidences compiled a brief, but elaborate work, of the Antiquities of Staffordshire, as yet not made publick by the press, which is now in the hands of an eminent and learned Gentleman of that County, Walter Chetwind Esq."

Anthony à Wood, however, denied his authorship of the Armorie, adding that Erdeswicke "being oftentimes crazed, especially in his last days, and fit then for no kind of serious business, would say anything which came into his mind, as 'tis very well known at this day among the chief of the College of Arms". William Camden and other antiquaries praise his knowledge and industry, and he is believed to have been elected a member of the Elizabethan Society of Antiquaries.

=== Death and memorial ===
Erdeswicke died in 1603, but the date usually given, 11 April, must be erroneous, as his will is dated 15 May: probate was granted on 6 October. Sandon church has or had a fine series of altar-tombs with incised alabaster slabs commemorating members of the Erdeswicke family. Sampson Erdeswick is buried in the church among his ancestors, with a very large elaborate polychrome monument in which his costumed effigy is recumbent below, with two deep-set kneeling female mourners (his wives) in arched recesses over. At either side, columns with Corinthian order capitals support a double entablature in the late Elizabethan style, framing an inscription and (formerly) with obeliskoid finials. The whole is overlain with a copious display of heraldic escutcheons and surmounted centrally by a crest.

== Family ==
The following details of Erdeswicke's family are as given in his memorial inscription, which was composed in 1601 during his lifetime. His first wife was Elizabeth, second daughter and one of the three heirs of Humphrey Dixwell or Dikeswell of Church Waver in Warwickshire. By her he had five daughters:

- Margaret
- Helen, who married Thomas Coyne, of Weston Coyne, Staffordshire.
- Elizabeth
- Maria
- Margery

His second wife, whom he married on 24 April 1593, was Mary Neale, daughter of Francis Neale of Prestwold in Keythorpe, Leicestershire. She was the widow of Everard Digby, by whom she had 14 children, and was mother of that recusant Everard Digby who was executed in 1606 for his part in the Gunpowder Plot. By Sampson Erdeswick she had three children:

- Richard (1594-1640), MP, who married Anne Orwell.
- Matthew, who married Alice, relict of John Johnson of Millwigge.
- Joan
