= Mabel Danvers Ryder, Countess of Harrowby =

British peeress (died 1956)

Lady Mabel Danvers Ryder Countess of Harrowby, DBE
- Born: Mabel Danvers Smith
- Organization(s): Women's Institute, Sandon and District Nursing Association (President)
- Spouse: John Ryder, 5th Earl of Harrowby (married 1887)
- Parents: William Henry Smith (father); Emily Danvers Smith, 1st Viscountess Hambleden (mother)
- Honours: Dame Commander of the Order of the British Empire (1918)

Mabel Danvers Ryder, Countess of Harrowby (1867 - 1956) or Lady Harrowby was a British peeress. Daughter of Emily Danvers Smith, Viscountess Hambleden, and William Henry Smith, she was also known as The Honourable Mabel Danvers Smith before her marriage. She was appointed a Dame Commander of the Order of the British Empire (DBE) in the 1919 Birthday Honours for "services in connection with the entertainment of Officers of the Overseas Forces".

== Honours and support for causes ==
Lady Harrowby supported many different causes throughout her life, such as the Mothers’ Union, Girl Guides, Women's Institute, Waifs and Strays Society, and Personal Service League. She was president of the Sandon and District Nursing Association and was also a member of the Sandon branch of the Women's Institute in the village of Sandon, Staffordshire where the seat of the Earl of Harrowby, Sandon Hall, is based.

Her services "in connection with the entertainment of Officers of the Overseas Forces" were recognised when she was appointed a Dame Commander of the Order of the British Empire (DBE) in the 1919 Birthday Honours.

== Marriage and personal life ==
In 1887, she married John Ryder, 5th Earl of Harrowby in 1887 and together they had 4 children, including Dudley Ryder, 6th Earl of Harrowby. Her husband described her as “a perfect wife, one who shares all my joys and sorrows, and who has been a real help, a real pal.”

In November 1947, Lord and Lady Harrowby celebrated their diamond wedding anniversary and were congratulated by King George VI. As a result of their anniversary celebrations, the couple had to decline an invitation to attend the wedding of the future Queen Elizabeth II.

Lady Harrowby died in 1956 and three days later, her husband also died. The couple had a joint funeral at Sandon Church on April 2, 1956, during which the wedding march was played and sprigs of myrtle grown from a cutting taken from Lady Harrowby's wedding bouquet were laid on their coffins.
