= William Wyrley =

William Wyrley (1565–1618) was an English antiquarian and officer of arms, who became Rouge Croix pursuivant.

== Life ==
Born in Staffordshire, he was the son of Augustine Wyrley of Wyrley, Staffordshire, and of Netherseal, and his wife Mary, daughter of Walter Charnells of Snarestone, Leicestershire. Educated at a country grammar school, he was taken on while still young as an amanuensis by the antiquary Samson Erdeswicke.

Soon after 1592, Wyrley left Erdeswicke's service, and then matriculated from Balliol College, Oxford on 29 November 1594, aged 29. At Oxford he apparently encountered William Burton, and they later made a joint survey of churches in Leicestershire. On 15 May 1604 Wyrley was appointed Rouge Croix pursuivant at the College of Arms. He took part in the funeral procession of Henry Frederick, Prince of Wales in 1612.

He died at the college on 16 February 1618, and was buried in St Benet's, Paul's Wharf.

== Legacy ==
Some portion of Wyrley's collections of arms and monumental inscriptions made in Leicestershire and other counties, as well as in churches in and near London, was acquired by Ralph Sheldon of Weston, Long Compton, Warwickshire. He is said to have bequeathed Wyrley's manuscripts, on his death in 1684, to the College of Arms. Identified as being of Wyrley's composition is Vincent MS. 197, entitled Church Notes of Leicestershire, Warwickshire, Northampton, York, Rutland, and Staffordshire. Notes by Wyrley on Staffordshire genealogy were incorporated in the edition of Erdeswicke's Survey of Staffordshire edited by Thomas Harwood in 1820.

== Works ==
While working with Erdeswicke, Wyrley published a heraldic essay: The trve Vse of Armorie, shewed by Historie, and plainly proued by Example (London, by J. Jackson for Gabriell Cawood, 1592). This included research on the origin and significance of heraldic emblems and two historical poems of his, "Lord Chandos" and "Capitall de Buz". William Dugdale republished part of the heraldic tract in his Ancient Usage of Bearing Arms (1682), ascribed to Erdeswicke; but Anthony Wood disputed Erdeswicke's responsibility. The tract was reprinted without the poems in 1853.

During his time at Balliol, Wyrley made "Collections of Arms from Monuments and Windows in Churches and elsewhere in and near Oxford", and notes from books belonging to monasteries in the neighbourhood.

== Notes ==
Attribution

This article incorporates text from a publication now in the public domain: Lee, Sidney, ed. (1900). "Wyrley, William". Dictionary of National Biography. Vol. 63. London: Smith, Elder & Co.
