= Birthday Honours =

UK national government awards

The Birthday Honours, in some Commonwealth realms, mark the reigning monarch's official birthday in each realm by granting various individuals appointment into national or dynastic orders or the award of decorations and medals. The honours are presented by the monarch or a viceregal representative. The Birthday Honours are one of two annual honours lists, along with the New Year Honours. All royal honours are published in the relevant gazette.

== History ==
Honours have been awarded with few exceptions on the sovereign's birthday since at least 1860, during the reign of Queen Victoria. There was no Birthday Honours list issued in 1876, which brought "a good deal of disappointment". A lengthy article in the Broad Arrow newspaper forgave the Queen and criticised Gathorne Hardy for neglecting to award worthy soldiers with the Order of the Bath: "With the War Minister all general patronage of this description rests, and if Mr. Hardy has not seen fit to mark the occasion in the usual way, he alone can be blamed or praised for having neglected to follow in the beaten track of his predecessors." At the same time, it was noted that the Queen appeared to have issued her own honours by appointing the Prince of Wales and the Duke of Connaught to be her personal aides-de-camp and the ailing King George of Hanover to be a general in the British Army. The first birthday as king of her successor, Edward VII (r. 1901–1910), fell on 9 November 1901.

From 1959, the monarch's official birthday in the United Kingdom was moved to a Saturday in early June. Other Commonwealth realms celebrate the official birthday of the monarch on different dates (generally late May or early June); honours are awarded accordingly. The Birthday Honours were not issued on occasions when they coincided with Jubilee Honours in 1887 and 1897 and Coronation Honours in 1911, 1937, and 1953.

The 2020 British Honours were postponed until the autumn because of the COVID-19 pandemic.

== See also ==
- Honours Committee
- Order of Australia
- Prime Minister's Resignation Honours

There are many articles on various years' honours. The format is consistent; change the year in the following examples. Many post-imperial entries have sections for the various Commonwealth realms.

- 1893 Birthday Honours
- 1920 Birthday Honours (New Zealand)
- 1990 Birthday Honours (Queen Mother)
- 2021 Birthday Honours
