= William Smith, 3rd Viscount Hambleden =

British peer (1903–1948)

William Henry Smith, 3rd Viscount Hambleden (25 July 1903 – 31 March 1948), a British peer, was chairman and owner of stationery group W H Smith from 1928 until his death.

== Early life and career ==
Hambleden was the second child and eldest son of Frederick Smith and Esther Georgiana Caroline nee Gore (1870–1955). a daughter of Arthur Gore, 5th Earl of Arran. He studied at Eton College and New College, Oxford.

After Frederick's death in 1928 the family's business, W H Smith, was reconstituted as a limited company in which William owned all the ordinary shares and served as chairman. On William's death in 1948, his heirs sold W H Smith shares to staff and the public to pay inheritance tax. William's younger brother, David John Smith, was chairman until 1972. The last Smith family member left the board in 1996.

== Title, marriage and family ==
William succeeded to the title of Viscount Hambleden following his father's death in 1928. His wife, Patricia Smith, Viscountess Hambleden, was a Lady of the Bedchamber to HM Queen Elizabeth, later the Queen Mother. Patricia was appointed Dame Commander of the Royal Victorian Order (DCVO), and, years later, Dame Grand Cross of the Royal Victorian Order (GCVO). The couple had five children:

- William Herbert Smith (1930–2012)
- Laura Caroline Beatrice Smith (1931–2000). Her son, Charles Brand (b. 1954) is a godson of Princess Margaret.
- Katharine Patricia Smith (1933–2002). Her son, Patrick Moffatt (b. 1968) is also a godson of Princess Margaret. In 1961 Katharine married Ivan Moffat, with whom she had two sons. The marriage was dissolved in 1972, and she married Peter Townend in 1973.
- Richard Edward Smith (1937–2014)
- Philip Reginald Smith (b. 1945)

Peerage of the United Kingdom
Preceded by Frederick Smith	Viscount Hambleden; 1928–1948	Succeeded by William Smith
