= Henry Smith, 5th Viscount Hambleden =

British peer

The Right Honourable The Viscount Hambleden
- Predecessor: William Smith, 4th Viscount Hambleden
- Born: William Henry Smith; 18 November 1955 (age 71); London, England
- Spouse: Sara Anlauf (m. 1983; sep. 2003)
- Issue: The Hon. Sara Smith; The Hon. Alexandra Smith
- Parents: William Smith, 4th Viscount Hambleden; Countess Maria Carmela Attolico di Adelfia

William Henry Smith, 5th Viscount Hambleden (born 18 November 1955) worked as a film producer and restaurateur.

== Marriage and family ==
Smith is the son of William Smith and Maria Carmela Attolico di Adelfia. He became a Viscount in 2012 when his father died.

Smith married Sara Suzanne Anlauf in 1983 and had two daughters, Sara Marie Celeste (b. 1986) and Alexandra Patricia (b. 1989). He separated from his wife in 2003. In 2012 he lived in Switzerland with singer Anni-Frid Lyngstad.

Peerage of the United Kingdom
Preceded by William Smith	Viscount Hambleden; 2012–	Incumbent
