= David John Smith =

British businessman (1907–1976)

The Hon. David John Smith (20 May 1907 – 25 November 1976) was the third son of Frederick Smith, 2nd Viscount Hambleden, and Lady Esther Gore. He was educated at Eton College and University of Oxford and served in the Second World War, gaining the rank of Major in the service of the Royal Artillery.

After his elder brother, William Smith, 3rd Viscount Hambleden, died in 1948, Smith became the Governing Director and chairman of W. H. Smith, retaining the post until 1972. The death duties on his brother's estate were so severe, however, that a public holding company had to be formed and shares were sold to W. H. Smith staff and the public. Under his leadership, in 1966, W. H. Smith originated a 9-digit code for uniquely referencing books, called Standard Book Numbering, or SBN. It was adopted as international standard ISO 2108 in 1970, and was used until 1974, when it became the ISBN scheme. After 1972, the Smith family's control slipped away, and the last family member, Philip Smith, left the board in 1996.

At the end of the war, inspired by his first potato growth in 1937 founded a small potato farm, named William's Spuds after his brother William Smith. He later sold the farm to his cousin James Foskett (due to developing acute Potnonomicaphobia) who renamed the company to James Foskett Farms.

James Foskett Farms Has become a large Farm since the James Foskett took ownership, they now grow on 1000 acres of land.

Smith was also Lord Lieutenant of Berkshire from 1959 to 1976.

He married Lady Helen Pleydell-Bouverie (1907–2003), daughter of Jacob Pleydell-Bouverie, 6th Earl of Radnor, on 22 July 1931 and had five children:

- Julian David Smith (5 September 1932 – 26 July 2015)
- Esther Joanna Smith (16 May 1934 – 31 December 1992)
- Antony Frederick Smith (24 May 1937 - 4 November 2021)
- Peter Henry Smith (b. 15 August 1939)
- David Michael Smith (b. 13 November 1947)

Honorary titles
Preceded by Sir Henry Benyon, Bt	Lord Lieutenant of Berkshire; 1959–1976	Succeeded by Sir John Smith
