= Milwich =

Village in Staffordshire, England

Coordinates: 52.88792°N 2.04314°W

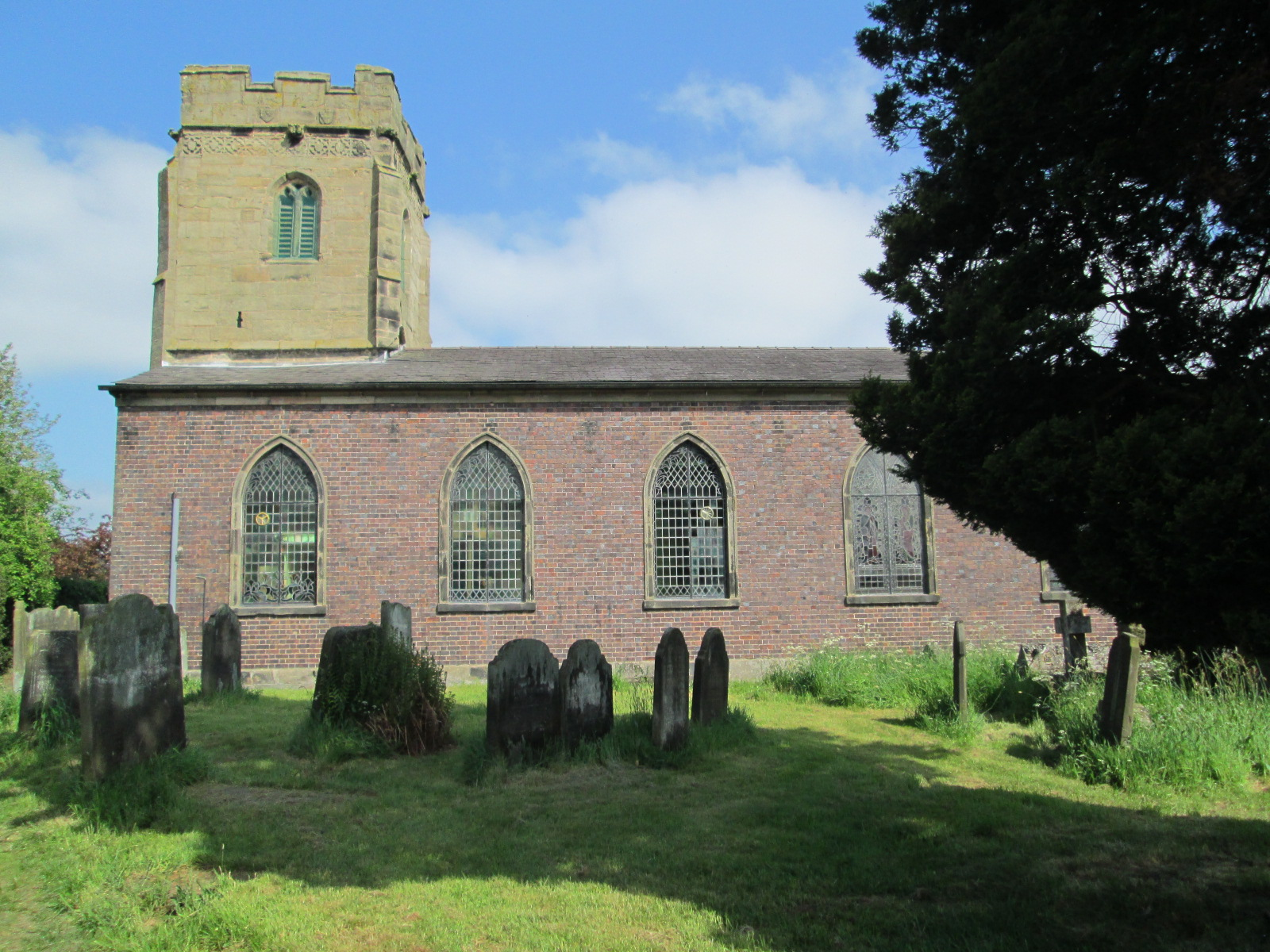
- The Parish Church of All Saints

- Location within Staffordshire
- Population: 418 (2011)
  - Density: 0.3
- OS grid reference: SJ9732 (397500, 332500)
  - London: 149
- District: Stafford
- Shire county: Staffordshire
- Region: West Midlands
- Country: England
- Sovereign state: United Kingdom
- Post town: STAFFORD
- Postcode district: ST18
- Dialling code: 01889
- Police: Staffordshire
- Fire: Staffordshire
- Ambulance: West Midlands
- UK Parliament: Stone, Great Wyrley and Penkridge

Milwich is a village and a civil parish in the English county of Staffordshire.

== Location ==
The village is 7.8 miles (12.6 km) north east of the town of Stafford, and 12.4 miles (20.0 km) south west of Stoke-on-Trent. The nearest railway station is 5.5 miles (8.9 km) west in the town of Stone. The village is on the B5027 road. The nearest main road is the A51 which passes the village 2.3 miles (3.7 km) to the south west.

== Population ==
The 2011 census recorded a population of 418 in 175 households. The parish comes under the Stafford non-metropolitan district.

== Village facilities ==
The village has a post office which can be found at Prospect House, Coton Hill. Within the village there is one public house, the Green Man. The parish church is dedicated to All Saints and is notable for possessing the oldest dated bell in Staffordshire and the seventh oldest dated English bell. The present church was rebuilt in place of an early medieval church 1792 and is a Grade II listed building. Further renovations and alterations saw a gallery added in 1837 and pitch pine panelling installed in 1888.

== History ==
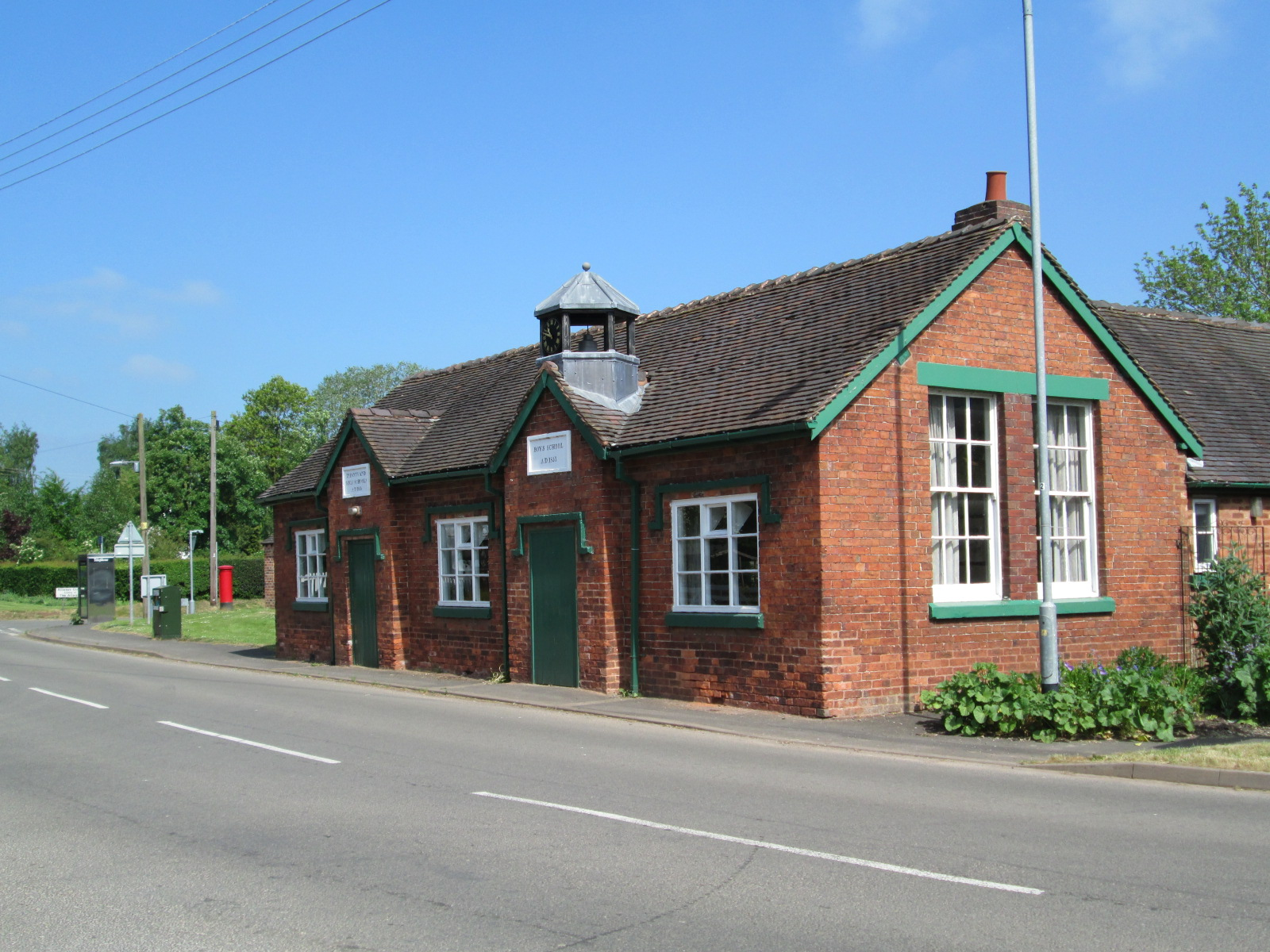
Former school, Milwich

=== Domesday Book ===
Milwich is listed in the Domesday Book of 1086. In the survey the village has the name Mulewiche and Melewich in the hundred of Pirehill. In the survey the settlement was described as quite small with only 8 households. The assets of the village listed include 4 villager or villein, meadow of 1 acres, a league of woodland and 4 smallholders. There was also 4 ploughlands (land for), 1 lord's plough teams, 3 men's plough teams. In 1066 the manor was held by Swein Rafwin, in 1086 Osbern. The tenant-in-chief in 1086 was Robert of Stafford. Taxation figures show the village had a taxable value 0.8 geld units with a value to the lord in 1086 of £1. The total tax assessment was valued at 1 geld unit.

=== Landowners ===
Staffordshire records show that by the 13th century the manor was controlled by two main landowners: Geoffrey, son of Philip de Nugent and Robert de Milwich. The latter's home was Milwich Hall, now a Grade II listed building, The timber-framed house was built on the site of what was thought to be the original Saxon Hall, which was encircled by a moat. The basis of the house was possibly built by the Astons of Tixall, who acquired a pocket of land in Milwich in 1493.

By the 20th century, the main landowner in Milwich was the Earl of Harrowby from Sandon Hall.

== See also ==
- Listed buildings in Milwich
