= Listed buildings in Milwich =

Milwich is a civil parish in the Borough of Stafford, Staffordshire, England. It contains 13 listed buildings that are recorded in the National Heritage List for England. Of these, one is at Grade II*, the middle of the three grades, and the others are at Grade II, the lowest grade. The parish contains the villages of Milwich and Coton, and the surrounding countryside. Most of the listed buildings are houses and farmhouses, the earlier of which are timber framed or have a timber framed core. The other listed buildings are a church, a public house, a former toll house, and a disused watermill.

== Key ==
Grade	Criteria
II*	Particularly important buildings of more than special interest
II	Buildings of national importance and special interest

== Buildings ==
Name and location	Photograph	Date	Notes	Grade
All Saints Church; 52.88524°N 2.04428°W		Medieval	The oldest part of the church is the west tower, which is in stone and in Perpendicular style. The rest of the church, consisting of the nave and a low short chancel, was rebuilt in 1792, and is in purple brick. The tower has two stages, diagonal buttresses, and an embattled parapet. The windows along the sides of the church have pointed heads, and the east window is Victorian.	II*
Ivy House Farmhouse; 52.88829°N 2.04134°W	—	Early 16th century (probable)	The house, which has been altered and restored, is timber framed with cruck construction, brick infill, and a thatched roof. There is one storey and an attic, three casement windows, and a dormer. Inside, there is exposed timber framing with raised crucks.	II
Milwich Hall; 52.88655°N 2.04321°W	—	Late 16th century (probable)	The house, which has been much altered, is timber framed with plastered brick infill, and a tile roof. There are two storeys and an attic, and a front of three projecting gabled bays. The windows are casements, and on the side is a massive chimney breast that is stone at the base and brick above.	II
Wheatsheaf Inn; 52.88574°N 2.03250°W		Early 17th century (probable)	The public house dates mainly from the 19th century. It is in engraved stucco, the upper storey is roughcast, and there is a first floor band. The public house has two storeys and an attic, and three bays, with a gable over the middle bay. The central doorway has a rectangular fanlight, above it is an inn sign filling a window space, and the windows are sashes.	II
Brook House; 52.88883°N 2.04458°W	—	17th century	The house, which has been much altered, has a timber framed core, and it was partly refronted in brick, which has been painted, in the 19th century. The house has a roof of asbestos slate. There is one storey and an attic, three bays, and a modern single-storey single-bay extension to the left. On the front is a rustic porch, the windows are casements with cambered heads, and there are three dormers.	II
Manor Farmhouse; 52.88915°N 2.04377°W	—	17th century (probable)	The farmhouse, which was refronted in the 19th century, is in red brick on a stone plinth, with moulded eaves, and a tile roof with stone-coped gables. There are two storeys, three bays, and an 18th-century rear wing. The doorway has a plain surround and a divided square fanlight, and the windows are casements with cambered heads.	II
Coton Villa; 52.88498°N 2.03265°W	—	18th century	The house is in roughcast brick with a tile roof. There are three storeys, two parallel ranges, and a front of two bays. The central doorway has moulded pilasters, a radial fanlight, and an open pediment, and the windows are sashes with plain lintels.	II
Grimblebrook House; 52.89101°N 2.04305°W	—	18th century (probable)	The house is timber framed on a stone plinth, and has a tile roof, two storeys and three bays. On the front is a shallow porch, the doorway has pilasters and a cornice hood, and the windows are casements, the roof sweeping over the upper floor windows.	II
The Round House; 52.88792°N 2.04337°W		Late 18th century (probable)	Originally a toll house standing at a road junction, and is in red brick with dentilled eaves and a hipped tile roof. There are two storeys, and a splayed end facing the junction. On the west side is a gabled rustic porch, and the windows are casements with cambered heads.	II
Coton Mill; 52.88072°N 2.03510°W	—	Late 18th or early 19th century	The former watermill is in red brick with gabled ends and two storeys. It is disused, but retains an undershot waterwheel and machinery.	II
Coton Cottage; 52.88711°N 2.02591°W	—	Early 19th century	A red brick house with a hipped slate roof, two storeys, and three bays. The doorway has moulded pilasters, a radial fanlight, and an open pediment, and the windows are sashes.	II
Rosedene; 52.88617°N 2.03052°W	—	Early 19th century	A cottage orné, it is in red brick with a tile roof, two storeys, and two bays. The windows are casements in projecting cases, those on the ground floor with bracketed sills. The eaves project and sweep over the upper floor windows. The doorway at the rear has a pointed arch and a tiled bonnet roof.	II
Former School; 52.88803°N 2.04311°W		1833	The former school is in red brick with a tile roof, and has one storey and a front of five bays. The second and fourth bays project slightly and are gabled, and on the fourth bay is an open cupola with a pyramidal roof containing a clock face. The gabled bays each contain a doorway with an inscribed tablet above. The windows are casement windows, and above the doorways and windows are hood moulds.	II
