= Patricia Smith, Viscountess Hambleden =

The Right Honourable The Viscountess Hambleden GCVO
- Born: 12 November 1904
- Died: 19 March 1994 (Age 89)
- Spouse: William Smith, 3rd Viscount Hambleden (m. 1928)
- Children: 5, including William
- Father: Reginald Herbert, 15th Earl of Pembroke

Patricia Caroline Beatrix Smith, Viscountess Hambleden GCVO (née Herbert; 12 November 1904 – 19 March 1994) was a Lady of the Bedchamber to Queen Elizabeth (later the Queen Mother) from 1937 to 1994.

== Early life ==
She was the eldest child of Reginald Herbert, 15th Earl of Pembroke and his wife, Beatrice. She grew up at Wilton House, Wiltshire. Her father descended from Countess Catherine Vorontsov.

In 1919, she was a bridesmaid at the wedding of the Hon. Olive Cecilia Paget, daughter of the 1st Baron Queensborough. She was also debutante of the year in 1922.

== Marriage and children ==
On 26 September 1928, she married William Henry Smith, 3rd Viscount Hambleden (a descendant of the W H Smith family) at Salisbury Cathedral. They had five children:

- The Hon. William Herbert Smith (b. 1930)
- The Hon. Laura Caroline Beatrice Smith (b. 1931)
- The Hon. Katharine Patricia Smith (b. 1933) (married to Ivan Moffat from 1961 to 1972)
- The Hon. Richard Edward Smith (b. 1937)
- The Hon. Philip Reginald Smith (b. 1945)

== Later life ==
As a senior member of the royal household, she was a leading guest at the 1947 wedding of Princess Elizabeth and Philip, Duke of Edinburgh. She was appointed a Dame Commander of the Royal Victorian Order (DCVO) in the 1953 Coronation Honours

She was at one time chairman of the NSPCC, and carried out voluntary work for King's College Hospital. In 1990, to celebrate the Queen Mother's 90th birthday (by that time she had served her for 53 years), she was made a Dame Grand Cross of the Royal Victorian Order.

Lady Hambleden's husband died in 1948 and she remained in the Queen Mother's Household until her own death in 1994 at her home in Ewelme, Oxfordshire.

== Styles and Honours ==
- The Hon. Patricia Herbert (1904–1913)
- Lady Patricia Herbert (1913–1928)
- The Rt. Hon. The Viscountess Hambleden (1928–1948)
- The Rt. Hon. The Dowager Viscountess Hambleden (1948–1953)
- The Rt. Hon. The Dowager Viscountess Hambleden DCVO (1953–1990)
- The Rt. Hon. The Dowager Viscountess Hambleden GCVO (1990–1994)
