= Frances Campbell-Preston =

British courtier (1918–2022)

Dame Frances Campbell-Preston DCVO
- Born: Frances Olivia Grenfell; 2 September 1918; St Leonards-on-Sea, East Sussex, England
- Died: 22 November 2022 (aged 104); London, England
- Education: St Paul's Girls' School
- Spouse: Patrick George Campbell-Preston (m. 1938; died 1960)
- Children: 4

Dame Frances Olivia Campbell-Preston DCVO (née Grenfell; 2 September 1918 – 22 November 2022) was a British courtier and author who served as lady-in-waiting to Queen Elizabeth the Queen Mother from 1965 to 2002.

== Family and education ==
Frances Olivia Grenfell was the daughter of Arthur Morton Grenfell (1873–1958), a grandson of the businessman Pascoe St Leger Grenfell, and his second wife, Hilda Margaret Lyttleton (1886–1972) (daughter of The Hon. Sir Neville Lyttelton), and her uncles included the politician Cecil Alfred Grenfell and the soldier Francis Octavius Grenfell. She was the sister-in-law of the actress and comedian Joyce Grenfell and aunt of the politician William Waldegrave, and her brother-in-law was Lord Ballantrae, Governor-General of New Zealand.

She was educated firstly at a Parents' National Educational Union school, whose teaching was based on the ideas of Charlotte Mason. She then attended St Paul's Girls' School in London.

On 2 December 1938, she married Lt.-Col. (George) Patrick Campbell-Preston DL MBE (1911–1960), the son of Col. Robert William Pigott Clarke Campbell-Preston (1865–1929) and his wife, Mary Augusta Margaret Nicol Thorne (1884–1930), and nephew of Gen. Sir Augustus Francis Andrew Nicol Thorne. Patrick, an officer in the Black Watch at the time of their marriage, was an equerry to Lord Tweedsmuir during the 1930s and was later imprisoned at Colditz Castle during the Second World War. He died in a car crash in 1960, after he and Frances had had four children.

== Later life ==
After coming out as a debutante in 1937, Campbell-Preston sailed to Canada the following year to become an informal lady-in-waiting to the viceregal consort, Lady Tweedsmuir. During the Second World War, she served with the Women's Royal Naval Service.

She was a member of Argyll County Council from 1960 to 1964 before being asked in 1965 by the Queen Mother's private secretary, Sir Martin Gilliat, who had been imprisoned with her husband at Colditz, to become a lady-in-waiting to the Queen Mother. She continued in that role, attending events nationally and abroad, until the Queen Mother's death in 2002. Campbell-Preston was described as a stalwart of the staff who was not hesitant to ask the Queen Mother difficult questions when other members were reluctant.

Campbell-Preston turned 100 on 2 September 2018, and died on 22 November 2022 at age 104.

== Honours ==
Campbell-Preston was appointed Commander of the Royal Victorian Order (CVO) in the 1977 New Year Honours and promoted to Dame Commander (DCVO) on the occasion of the Queen Mother's 90th birthday in the 1990 Queen Mother's Birthday Honours.

== Publications ==
Campbell-Preston was the author of two books:

- Campbell-Preston, Frances (2010). Grandmother's Steps. Wimborne Minster, Dorset: Dovecote Press. ISBN 978-1-904349-85-3.
- Campbell-Preston, Frances (2006). The Rich Spoils of Time. Wimborne Minster, Dorset: Dovecote Press. ISBN 978-1-904349-47-1.
