= Listed buildings in Sandon and Burston =

Sandon and Burston is a civil parish in the Borough of Stafford, Staffordshire, England. It contains 36 listed buildings that are recorded in the National Heritage List for England. Of these, one is listed at Grade I, the highest of the three grades, four are at Grade II*, the middle grade, and the others are at Grade II, the lowest grade. The parish contains the villages of Sandon and Burston, and the surrounding countryside. A major building in the parish is Sandon Hall, a country house which is listed together with associated structures and buildings in its grounds and estate. The Trent and Mersey Canal passes through the parish, and two mileposts along its towpath are listed. The other listed buildings include a church, houses and associated structures, cottages, farmhouses and farm buildings, a former railway station, a village club, and a public house.

== Key ==
Grade	Criteria
I	Buildings of exceptional interest, sometimes considered to be internationally important
II*	Particularly important buildings of more than special interest
II	Buildings of national importance and special interest

== Buildings ==
Name and location	Photograph	Date	Notes	Grade
All Saints Church; 52.86288°N 2.06959°W		Late 12th or early 13th century	The church was virtually rebuilt in about 1300, the north aisle was added in the 14th century. In 1851 the north aisle was remodelled as a family chapel, and the church was restored in 1923 by W. D. Caröe. It is built in stone with a tile roof, and consists of a nave, north and south aisles, a south porch, a chancel, and a southwest tower. The tower is in Perpendicular style, and has an embattled parapet with corner pinnacles.	I
Hardwick Farmhouse; 52.88271°N 2.08739°W	—	16th century (probable)	The farmhouse has a timber framed core, and has been much altered. The exterior is in brick with quoins and a tile roof. There are two storeys and an attic, and three gabled bays, the middle bay recessed. On the front is a gabled porch and a doorway with a moulded surround, and the windows are mullioned casements. Inside, there is some exposed timber framing.	II
Burston Lodge; 52.86754°N 2.09663°W		17th century	The house, which has been much altered and extended, has a timber framed core. There is some exposed timber framing with red brick infill, and the rest of the house is roughcast, with some painting to resemble timber framing. The roof is tiled, there are two storeys and an attic, a canted bay window, and a modern porch.	II
Seven Stars Cottage; 52.86134°N 2.07778°W		17th century (possible)	An estate cottage that was remodelled in about 1905. It has a timber framed core, and is roughcast with applied timber framing. There is a tile roof, gable ends with plain bargeboards, two storeys, and two bays. In the centre is a gabled porch, flanking the porch are three-light mullioned windows, and in the upper floor are casement windows under gables.	II
Sandon Lodge; 52.86297°N 2.07845°W	—	17th century	The house was refronted in the 18th century and extended to the right in the 19th century. At the rear of the original part is exposed timber framing with brick infill, the front is roughcast, the extension is in brick, and the roof is tiled with coped gables. There are two storeys and an attic, the original range has five bays, the middle bay projecting slightly under a pediment, and the extension has three bays. The doorway has pilasters, a rectangular fanlight, and a cornice hood. The windows are sashes; in the original part they have cambered heads, and in the extension they have wedge lintels.	II
Hardwick Grove; 52.88654°N 2.08939°W	—	1711	A red brick house with stone dressings, angle quoins and string courses. There are two storeys and an attic, and a front of three gabled bays, the middle bay recessed. In the centre is a porch with a dated pediment, and a doorway with a moulded surround, and the windows are three-light casements.	II
Gates, standards and screens, Sandon Hall; 52.85619°N 2.06561°W	—	Early 18th century	The gates and associated structures were moved to their present site from Burnt Norton House in about 1900. They are in wrought iron, and consist of a pair of gates on openwork standards with an overthrow. The side screens are later copies of the originals.	II*
Gate piers, Burston Hall; 52.86700°N 2.09658°W	—	Early 18th century	The gate piers are in rusticated stone, and have moulded cornice caps and ball finials.	II
Ice house 52.86020°N 2.06728°W	—	c. 1780	The ice house in the grounds of Sandon Hall is set into a mound. It consists of a small chamber with a stone wall in front containing a doorway surmounted by a pedimented feature.	II
Coots House; 52.86155°N 2.07798°W		Late 18th century	A farmhouse, later a private house, it is in red brick with a band, corbelled eaves, and a tile roof. There are two storeys, two parallel ranges, and three bays. The doorway has moulded pilasters, a rectangular fanlight, and a cornice hood on consoles, and the windows are casements with segmental heads.	II
Knowles Cottages and Stonebench Cottage; 52.86324°N 2.07836°W		Late 18th century (probable)	A group of three estate cottages in two ranges at right angles, all with two storeys. The older are Knowles Cottages, facing the road. They are roughcast with a tile roof, three bays, gabled porches, and casement windows, those in the upper floor under gables. Stonebench Cottage dates from the early 19th century and is at right angles to the road. It is in red brick with a slate roof, three bays, a doorway with a gabled hood, and casement windows.	II
Yewtree Farmhouse; 52.86819°N 2.08087°W	—	Late 18th century	The farmhouse is in red brick with a string course, dentilled eaves, and a tile roof with coped gables. There are two storeys and three bays. In the centre is a doorway with pilasters and a rectangular fanlight, and the windows are casements with cambered heads.	II
Outbuildings south of Home Farmhouse; 52.85350°N 2.05900°W	—	1782	Part of a model farm designed by Samuel Wyatt, the buildings are in stone with slate roofs. They are ranged round three sides of a courtyard, and have one storey with two-storey central pavilions.	II
Sandon Limekiln; 52.85914°N 2.08228°W	—	c. 1790	The limekiln was used for burning both lime and flint, and consists of a red brick pot partly encased in sandstone under a mound of earth. It has an L-shaped plan, and includes a storage area. At the entrance is a pediment and a cornice.	II
Burston House; 52.86805°N 2.09711°W		c. 1800	A red brick house with a string course, and a tile roof with stone-coped gables. There are three storeys, and an L-shaped plan, with a symmetrical front of three bays, and a rear wing. Steps lead up to a central projecting porch containing a round-headed doorway with a moulded surround and cornice hood. The windows are sashes; in the ground floor they are tripartite, and in the middle floor they have shaped and moulded lintels.	II
Railings and gate, Burston House; 52.86802°N 2.09727°W	—	c. 1800	The railings and gate are in wrought iron, and extend along the front of the garden.	II
Pitt's Column; 52.85101°N 2.05605°W		1806	The column was erected in the grounds of Sandon Hall by the 1st Earl of Harrowby to commemorate William Pitt the Younger. It is in stone, and consists of a Doric column on a square base and surmounted by an urn finial. The column is 75 feet (23 m) high, and its design is based on Trajan's Column in Rome. It is enclosed by wrought iron railings.	II*
The Perceval Shrine; 52.86079°N 2.06243°W	—	c. 1815	The shrine in the grounds of Sandon Hall is to the memory of Spencer Perceval, the Prime Minister who was assassinated in 1812. It is in stone, set into a hillside, and consists of a vaulted recess with a segmental arch, an embattled parapet, and a lean-to roof.	II
Canal milepost at SJ 9294 3073; 52.87404°N 2.10618°W		1819	The milepost is on the towpath of the Trent and Mersey Canal. It is in cast iron and has a circular post, a moulded head, and two convex tablets with the distances to Preston Brook and Shardlow.	II
Canal milepost at SJ 9368 2953; 52.86305°N 2.09452°W		1819	The milepost is on the towpath of the Trent and Mersey Canal. It is in cast iron and has a circular post, a moulded head, and two convex tablets with the distances to Preston Brook and Shardlow.	II
Burston Hall; 52.86702°N 2.09689°W	—	Early 19th century	The house is in plastered brick with a slate roof, two storeys, and three bays. In the centre is a portico with Doric columns, and the doorway has a moulded surround. Flanking the portico are canted bay windows, and the upper floor contains sash windows.	II
Burston Villa; 52.86921°N 2.10164°W	—	Early 19th century	A red brick house with a sill band, a moulded eaves cornice, and a blocking course. There are three storeys and three bays. On the front is a porch and a doorway with a moulded surround, a keyblock, a moulded stone cornice, and a balustrade. The windows are sashes, those in the ground floor are tripartite.	II
Stonehouse Farmhouse; 52.86385°N 2.06111°W		Early 19th century	The farmhouse is in stone with tile roof. It has a main range with three storeys and an attic, a projecting gabled cross-wing with three storeys, and a single-storey bay on the right. The windows are mullioned with hood moulds, the porch is gabled, and the doorway has a pointed head and a hood mould.	II
The Old Lodge; 52.86054°N 2.07683°W	—	Early 19th century	A stone house that has a slate roof with coped gables. There is one storey, two bays, and a rear wing in stone and brick. The doorway has a plain surround and an entablature, and the windows are sashes.	II
The Old Smithy; 52.86616°N 2.08119°W	—	Early 19th century	A red brick house with moulded eaves, and a roof with ornamental tiles, coped gables, and finials. There is one storey and an attic, and two bays. The left projects and contains a casement window, and the right bay has a doorway with a four-centred arched head.	II
Trentham Tower; 52.86036°N 2.05806°W		c. 1840	This was originally the upper part of a tower at Trentham Hall, it was designed by Charles Barry, and was moved to its present site in the grounds of Sandon Hall after Trentham Hall was demolished in 1910–12. It is in stone on a plastered brick base, and is in Italianate style. The structure has a square plan, and consists of three open arches on each side with engaged Corinthian columns supporting an entablature. At the top is an open balustrade and urn finials.	II*
Sandon railway station 52.86093°N 2.08062°W		1849–50	The railway station building, no longer in use, is in red brick with blue brick diapering, stone dressings, a moulded string course, and a tile roof with coped gables, kneelers and obelisk finials. There are two storeys, three bays and an T-shaped plan, with a single-storey wing to the west. In the centre is a porte-cochère with a semicircular arch on each side. The station building has a moulded string course, mullioned windows in moulded architraves, and doorways with moulded surrounds and cambered heads.	II
Lichfield Lodge; 52.84960°N 2.05245°W	—	Mid 19th century	The lodge is in stone and has a tile roof with coped gables and finials. There are two storeys and two bays. The doorway has pilasters, a triple keystone and an open pediment, and the windows are sashes.	II
Gates and gate piers, Lichfield Lodge, 52.84957°N 2.05254°W	—	Mid 19th century	The gate piers are in rusticated stone, and have cornice caps, and the gates are in wrought iron.	II
Sandon Hall; 52.85582°N 2.06531°W		1852	A country house designed by William Burn, it is in Jacobean style, and replaces an earlier house on the site. The house is built in stone with slate roofs, and has two storeys and a front of nine bays. In the centre is a porte-cochère with round-headed doorway and a balustrade, and above it are turrets with ogee roofs, between which is a clock. In the outer bays are shaped gables, the left turreted bay projects, and is linked by a curved screen wall to a conservatory added in 1864.	II*
Home Farm Lodge; 52.85182°N 2.06140°W		1869	The lodge is roughcast with applied timber framing, sprocket eaves, and a roof of ornamental tiles. There are two storeys and two bays, the left bay projecting and gabled. In the angle is a porch, the windows are casements, and in the right bay is a gabled dormer. In the right return is a canted bay window.	II
Stafford Lodges; 52.86097°N 2.07733°W		1902	The lodges flanking the entrance to the drive are in stone with moulded string courses and slate roofs, and are in Jacobean style. They have two storeys and fronts of two bays. On the fronts facing the road and the drive are Dutch gables with finials, the doorways have pediments, and the windows are sashes.	II
Gate piers, gates and screens, Stafford Lodges; 52.86106°N 2.07730°W		c. 1902	The gate piers are in stone, they are rusticated and panelled, and have cornice caps surmounted by dragon heads. Between them is a pair of wrought iron gates and an overthrow containing a coat of arms. The piers are flanked by iron screens each containing a pedestrian gate.	II
Village Club; 52.86150°N 2.07859°W		1904	The building was designed by Guy Dawber in Arts and Crafts style, and is in red brick and roughcast with applied timber framing on a brick plinth. It has quoins and a tile roof. There are three bays, the left bay is gabled, and has two storeys, a six-light oriel window in the upper floor, and a recessed doorway blow. The other bays have one storey, and each bay has a hipped dormer with a four-light window. On the roof is a lantern with a wind vane.	II
Dawber Cottages; 52.86100°N 2.07789°W		1904–05	The cottages, designed by Guy Dawber in Arts and Crafts style, are in brick in the lower part of the ground floor, and above are roughcast with applied timber framing. They have angle quoins, sprocket eaves, and tile roofs. There are two storeys, and the cottages form an L-shaped plan. They contain gabled bays, mullioned casement windows, gabled and box dormers, a canted oriel window, plain doorways, and a gabled porch. All the windows have leaded lights.	II
Dog and Doublet Inn; 52.86096°N 2.07840°W		1906	The public house was designed by Guy Dawber in Arts and Crafts style, and is in red brick and roughcast with some applied timber framing, and a tile roof. There are two storeys and an L-shaped plan, with a long rear wing. On the front are two projecting gabled bays, the right of these containing a stone rusticated carriage arch. The windows are mullioned casements with leaded lights, and the porch has a hipped roof.	II
