= William Smith, 4th Viscount Hambleden =

British peer

William Herbert "Harry" Smith, 4th Viscount Hambleden (2 April 1930 – 2 August 2012) was a British peer.

== Life and family ==
Smith was the son of William Smith, 3rd Viscount Hambleden, and Patricia née Herbert. He went to school at Eton College. He became a Viscount after his father died in 1948. Smith married Maria Carmela Attolico di Adelfia in 1955. The couple had five sons:

- William Henry (born 1955)
- Bernardo James (born 1957)
- Alexander David (born 1959)
- Nicolas Robin Bartolomeo (born 1960)
- Lorenzo Patrick Harold (born 1962)

After the couple's divorce in 1988, Smith married Lesley Watson and moved to America. He sold most of the family estate in 2007 and died of cancer at his home in Reno, Nevada, in 2012.

Peerage of the United Kingdom
Preceded by William Smith	Viscount Hambleden; 1948–2012	Succeeded by Henry Smith
