= William Henry Smith (English politician) =

English bookseller, newsagent and politician (1825–1891)

The Right Honourable William Henry Smith FRS
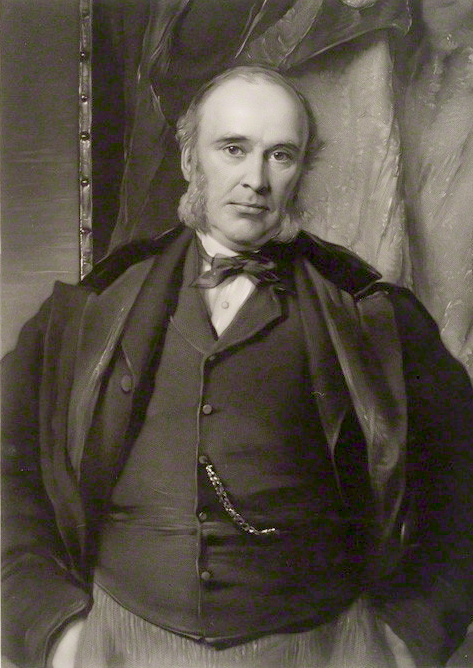

First Lord of the Treasury
- In office 14 January 1887 – 6 October 1891
- Monarch: Victoria
- Prime Minister: The Marquess of Salisbury
- Preceded by: The Marquess of Salisbury
- Succeeded by: Arthur Balfour

Leader of the House of Commons
- In office 14 January 1887 – 6 October 1891
- Prime Minister: The Marquess of Salisbury
- Preceded by: Lord Randolph Churchill
- Succeeded by: Arthur Balfour

Personal details
- Born: 24 June 1825 London, England
- Died: 6 October 1891 (aged 66)
- Party: Conservative
- Spouse(s): Emily Danvers (1858–1913)
- Children: 6, including Mabel and Frederick

William Henry Smith, FRS (24 June 1825 – 6 October 1891) was an English bookseller, newsagent and politician. As head of the family firm W H Smith, he expanded the firm and introduced the practice of selling books and newspapers at railway stations. He was elected a Member of Parliament in 1868 and rose to the position of First Lord of the Admiralty less than ten years later. Because of his lack of naval experience, he was perceived as a model for the character Sir Joseph Porter in H.M.S. Pinafore (and consequently nicknamed Pinafore Smith). In the mid-1880s, he was twice Secretary of State for War, and later First Lord of the Treasury and Leader of the House of Commons, among other posts.

== Background and business career ==
The son of entrepreneur William Henry Smith, Smith was born in London. He was educated at Tavistock Grammar School before joining his father's newsagent and book business in 1846, at which time the firm became W H Smith & Son. The two men took advantage of the railway boom by opening news-stands on railway stations, starting with Euston in 1848.

In 1850 the firm opened depots in Birmingham, Manchester and Liverpool. The business became a household name (W H Smith), and Smith junior used the success of the firm as a springboard into politics.

In February 1878, he was elected a Fellow of the Royal Society.

== Political career ==
In 1868, Smith was elected Member of Parliament for Westminster as a Conservative after an initial attempt to get into Parliament as a "Liberal-Conservative" in 1865 as a supporter of Prime Minister Lord Palmerston. In 1874, Smith was appointed Financial Secretary to the Treasury when Disraeli returned as Prime Minister. In 1877, he became First Lord of the Admiralty even though he never went to sea throughout his life. It has been claimed that Smith's appointment was the inspiration for the character of Sir Joseph Porter, KCB, in Gilbert and Sullivan's 1878 comic opera, H.M.S. Pinafore.

Gilbert had written to Sullivan in December 1877, "The fact that the First Lord in the opera is a Radical of the most pronounced type will do away with any suspicion that W. H. Smith is intended". However, the character was seen as a reflection on Smith, and even Disraeli was overheard to refer to his First Lord as "Pinafore Smith". It has been suggested that the Pinafore character was as much based on Smith's controversial predecessor as First Lord, Hugh Childers, as on Smith himself. Smith held the office for three years until the Liberal Party returned to power.

In 1885, a redistribution of seats led to Smith now standing for the Strand division in Westminster, and he served as Chief Secretary for Ireland for a short period in the following year. He served twice as Secretary of State for War: for the first time in Lord Salisbury's brief 1885–86 ministry, and for the second when the Conservatives won the 1886 general election. Following this appointment, he succeeded in 1887 as First Lord of the Treasury and Leader of the House of Commons, and became Lord Warden of the Cinque Ports in 1891.

He died shortly afterwards at Walmer Castle, Kent, and his widow was created Viscountess Hambleden in his honour and took the title from the village close to the Smiths' country house of Greenlands, near Henley-on-Thames, Oxon. One of the few ministers personally close to Lord Salisbury (apart from the Salisbury's nephew, Arthur Balfour), Smith was dubbed "Old Morality" because of his austere manner and conduct.

== Family ==
Smith married Emily, daughter of Frederick Dawes Danvers, in 1858. They had two sons and four daughters:

- Mabel Danvers Smith (d. 1956; she married the 5th Earl of Harrowby)
- Emily Anna Smith (1859–1942; she married Admiral William Acland)
- Helen Smith (1860–1944)
- Beatrice Danvers Smith (1864–1942)
- Henry Walton Smith (1865–1866)
- William Frederick Danvers Smith (1868–1928)

He died in October 1891, aged 66. The following month, his widow was raised to the peerage in his honour as Viscountess Hambleden, of Hambleden in the County of Buckingham. She died in August 1913 and was succeeded by her and Smith's only surviving son, Frederick.

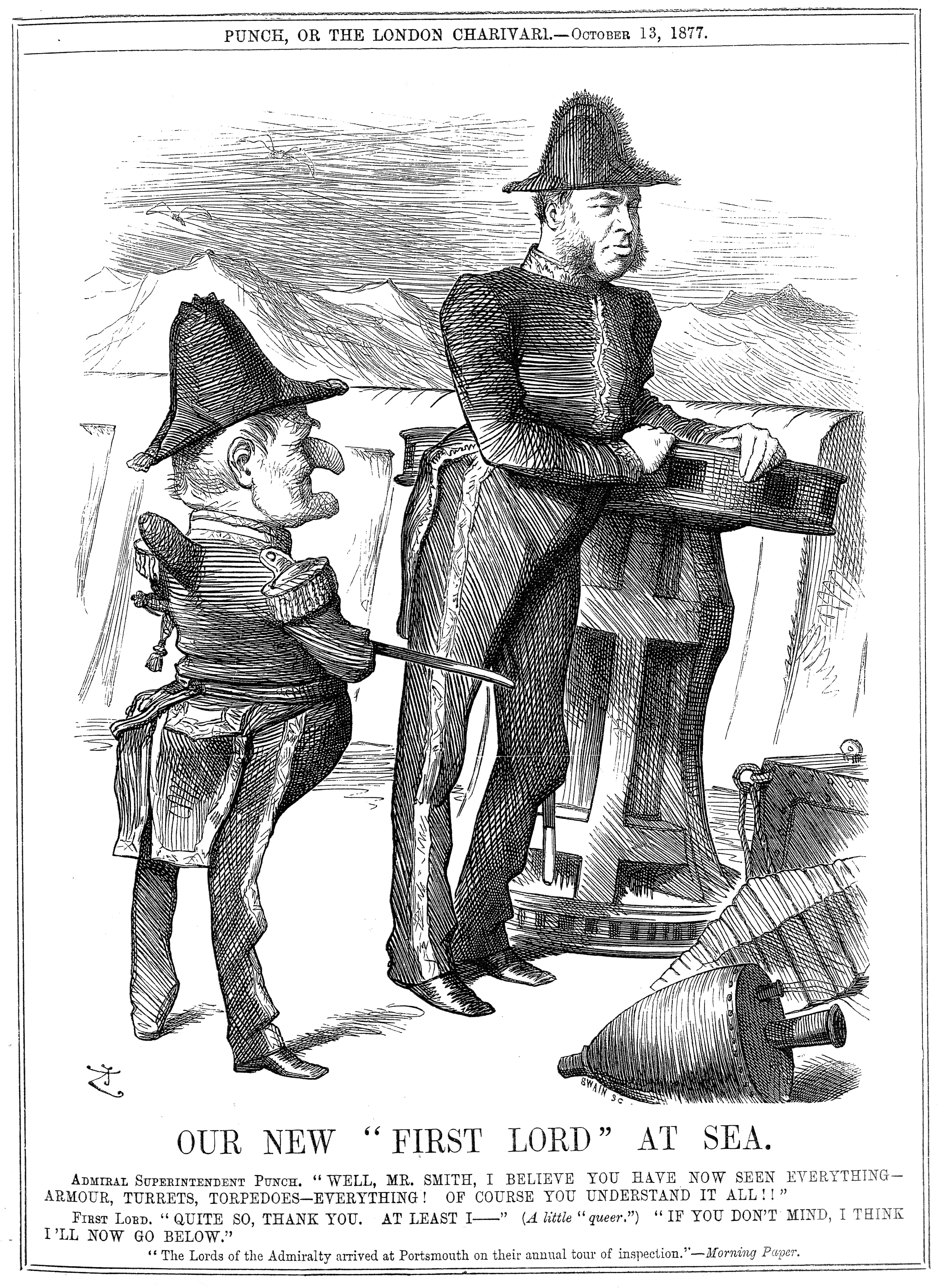
Pinafore did not begin the mockery of Smith: This Punch cartoon is from 13 October 1877, months before the première of Pinafore.

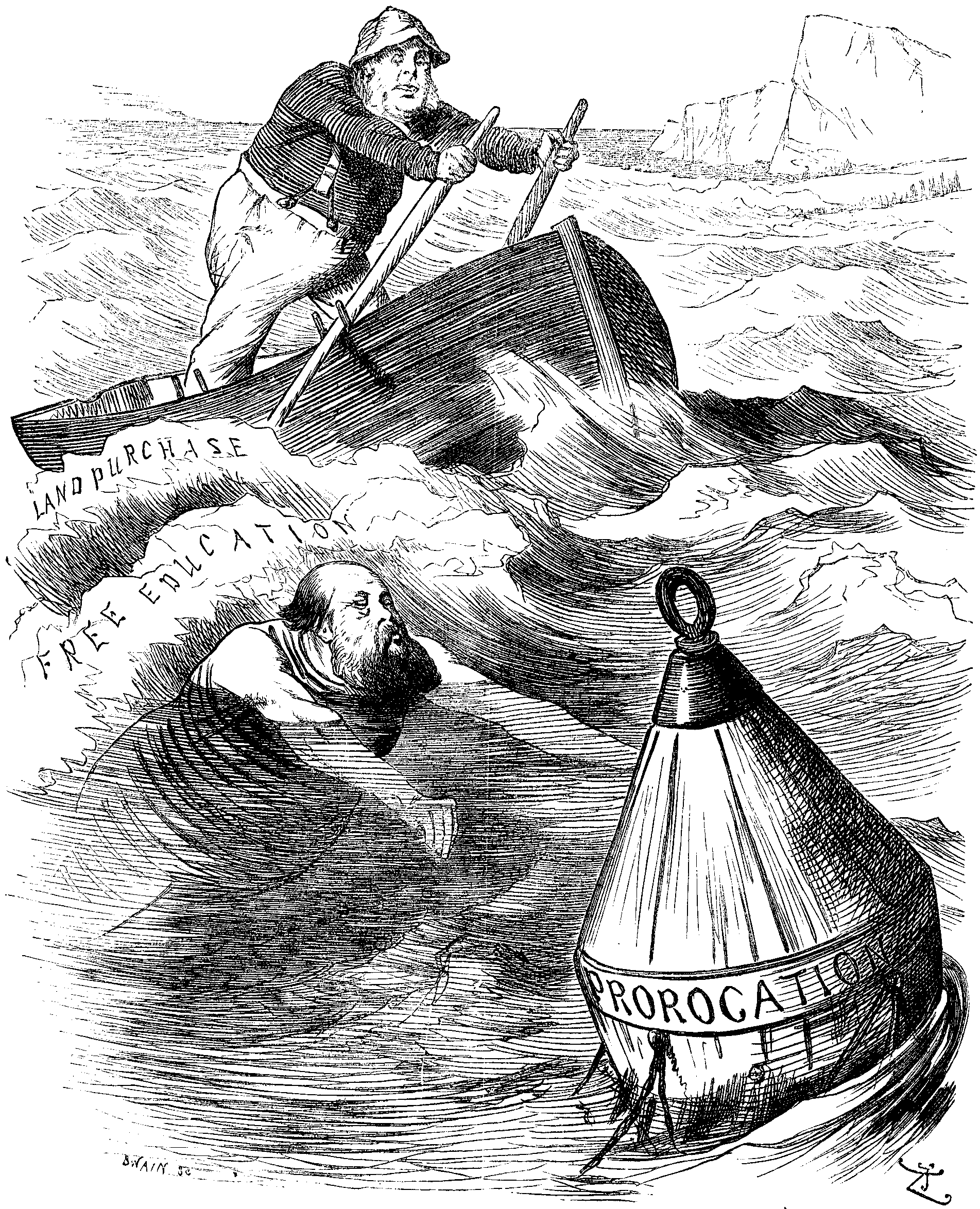
A Long Distance Swim, W. H. Smith: "Hooray – another stroke or two and we've done it." (Note: Cartoon satirising Smith as rowing and Lord Salisbury, Prime Minister, swimming towards the end of the Parliamentary year to escape the twin waves of Free Education and Land Purchase, contentious issues of the time. Smith died three months after the publication of this cartoon (Punch, 1891))

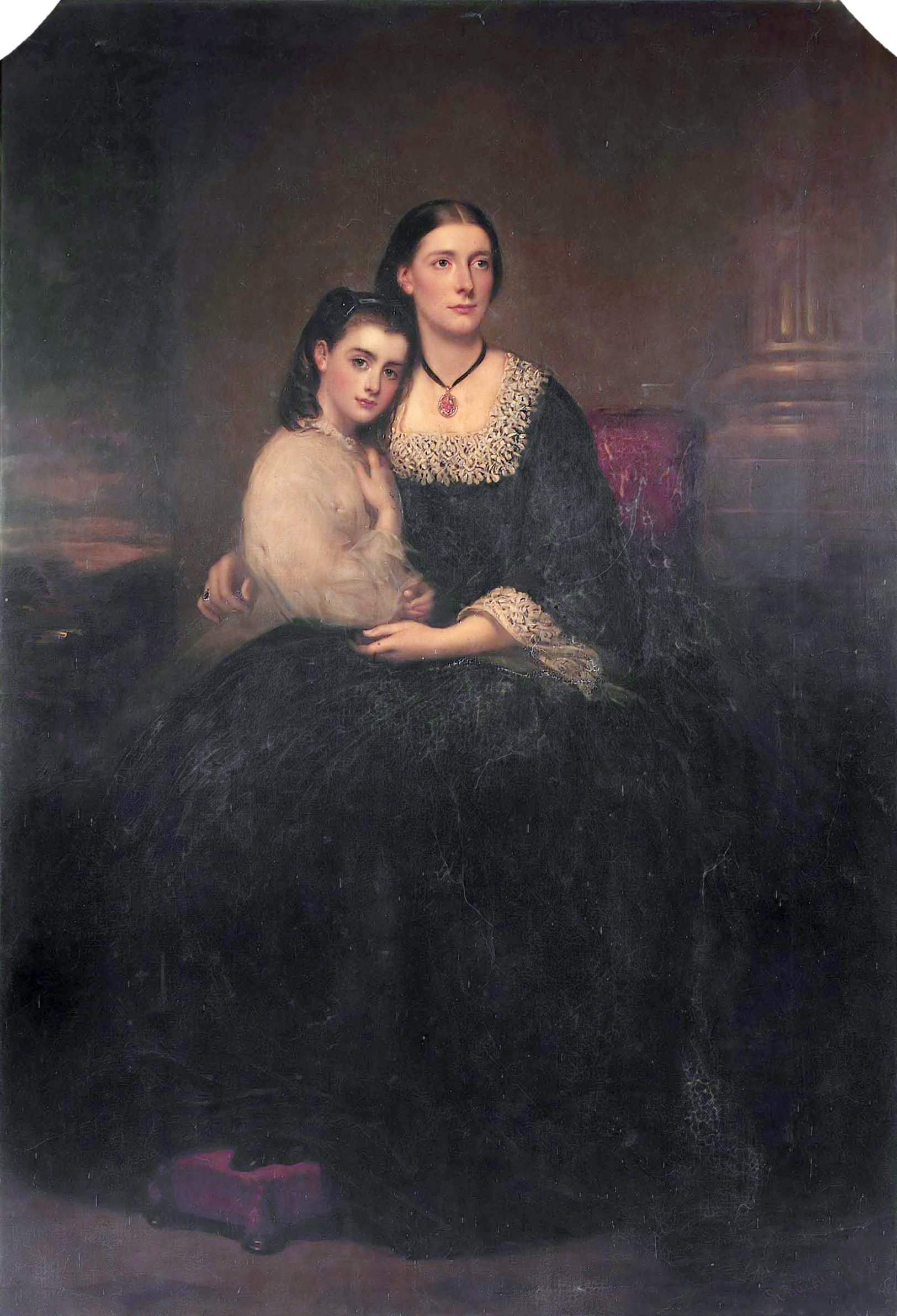
Emily, 1st Viscountess Hambleden, and her daughter (Richard Buckner)

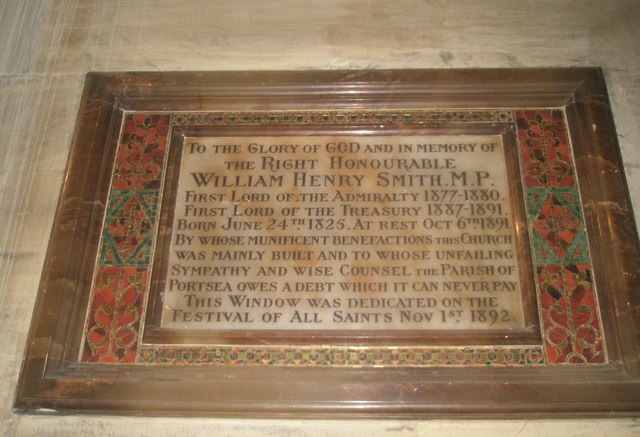
Memorial in St Mary's Portsea

== Bibliography ==
- Gilbert, W. S.; Sullivan, Sir Arthur (2002). Jones, Ephraim Hammett; Simpson, Carl (eds.). H.M.S. Pinafore in Full Score (New ed.). Mineola, New York: Dover Publications, Inc. ISBN 0-486-42201-1.
- Maxwell, Herbert Eustace (1898). "Smith, William Henry (1825-1891)" . Dictionary of National Biography. Vol. 54. pp. 157–160.
- Maxwell, Sir Herbert, Bart., M.P. (1894). Life of the Right Honourable William Henry Smith M.P. (New ed.). London: William Blackwood and Sons.
- Wilson, Charles (1985). First With the News: The History of W. H. Smith 1792-1972. London: Jonathan Cape. ISBN 0-224-02156-7.

Parliament of the United Kingdom
Preceded by John Stuart Mill	Member of Parliament for Westminster; 1868–1885	Succeeded by William Burdett-Coutts
Preceded by (new constituency)	Member of Parliament for Strand; 1885–1891	Succeeded by Frederick Smith
Political offices
Preceded by John George Dodson	Financial Secretary to the Treasury; 1874–1877	Succeeded by Hon. Frederick Stanley
Preceded by George Ward Hunt	First Lord of the Admiralty; 1877–1880	Succeeded by The Earl of Northbrook
Preceded by Marquess of Hartington	Secretary of State for War; 1885–1886	Succeeded by The Viscount Cranbrook
Preceded by Sir William Hart Dyke, Bt	Chief Secretary for Ireland; 1886	Succeeded by John Morley
Preceded by Sir Henry Campbell-Bannerman	Secretary of State for War; 1886–1887	Succeeded by Hon. Edward Stanhope
Preceded by The Marquess of Salisbury	First Lord of the Treasury; 1887–1891	Succeeded by Arthur Balfour
Preceded by Lord Randolph Churchill	Leader of the House of Commons; 1887–1891	Succeeded by Arthur Balfour
Party political offices
Preceded by Lord Randolph Churchill	Conservative Leader of the Commons; 1887–1891	Succeeded by Arthur Balfour
Honorary titles
Preceded by The Earl Granville	Lord Warden of the Cinque Ports; 1891	Succeeded by The Marquess of Dufferin and Ava
