= Richard Erdeswicke =

Richard Erdeswicke (1594-1640) was an English MP, whose public career was hampered by debt.

== Life ==
Erdeswicke was the son of the Staffordshire antiquary Sampson Erdeswicke by his second wife Mary (née Neale), daughter of Francis Neale of Keythorpe in Leicestershire. His family were staunchly recusant. He was still a minor when his father died and his wardship was acquired by Thomas Gerard, 1st Baron Gerard, who sold it back to Erdeswicke's mother. His mother borrowed money from his half-brother Sir Everard Digby to purchase Erdeswicke's wardship, which led to complications when Everard was executed for his part in the 1605 Gunpowder Plot and his estate confiscated by the Crown.

Despite his family's Catholicism, Erdeswicke was educated at Eton, Cambridge and the Inns of Court. He married Anne Orwell, while still a minor. His half-brother George Digby was a friend of George Villiers, 1st Duke of Buckingham and the influence of the king's favourite enabled Erdeswicke to pursue a public career when he came of age, despite his recusant associations. Erdeswicke's selection to represent Staffordshire in 1625 was probably due to a combination of the county's desire to curry favour with Buckingham, the influence of Digby's father-in-law Sir Walter Chetwynd, who had held the seat in 1614 and the sheriff Edward Stanford himself having a recusant background. He was not an active MP and his public career was short-lived, presumably because of debt. The estate he had acquired from his father had been heavily encumbered and the debts were increased securing his own wardship. In February 1628 he acquired a royal protection against being arrested for debt through Buckingham's 'favourable mediation. He sold Sandon to Digby, but this did not solve his problems and he was eventually imprisoned for debt in the Fleet Prison, where he died. He left one son Sampson (d. 1654).

Parliament of England
Preceded by Sir William Bowyer; Sir Edward Littleton	Member of Parliament for Staffordshire; With: Sir Simon Weston	Succeeded by Sir William Bowyer; Sir Simon Weston
