= Frederick Smith, 2nd Viscount Hambleden =

British politician (1868-1928)

Colonel The Right Honourable The Viscount Hambleden DL
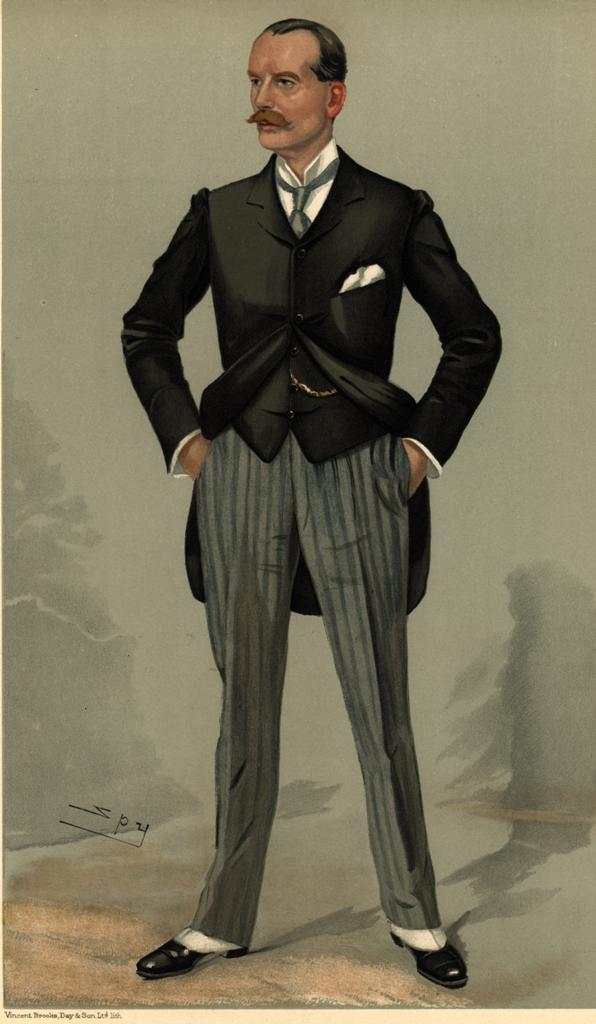
- "Head of the greatest publishing house in Christendom" — Smith as caricatured by Spy (Leslie Ward) in Vanity Fair, December 1904

Member of Parliament for Strand
- In office 1891–1910
- Preceded by: William Henry Smith
- Succeeded by: Walter Long

Personal details
- Born: 12 August 1868
- Died: 16 June 1928 (aged 59)
- Party: Conservative
- Spouse: Esther Georgiana Caroline Gore
- Children: 5
- Parents: William Henry Smith (father); Emily Smith (mother)
- Relatives: William Henry Smith (paternal grandfather); William Henry Smith (son); David John Smith (son); Arthur Gore, 5th Earl of Arran (father-in-law)
- Education: Eton College
- Alma mater: New College, Oxford
- Military career
- Allegiance: United Kingdom
- Branch: British Army
- Service years: 1885–1922
- Rank: Colonel
- Units: 2nd Buckinghamshire Rifle Volunteers (Eton College); Royal 1st Devon Yeomanry; Imperial Yeomanry; Royal Devon Yeomanry
- Conflicts: Boer War; World War I

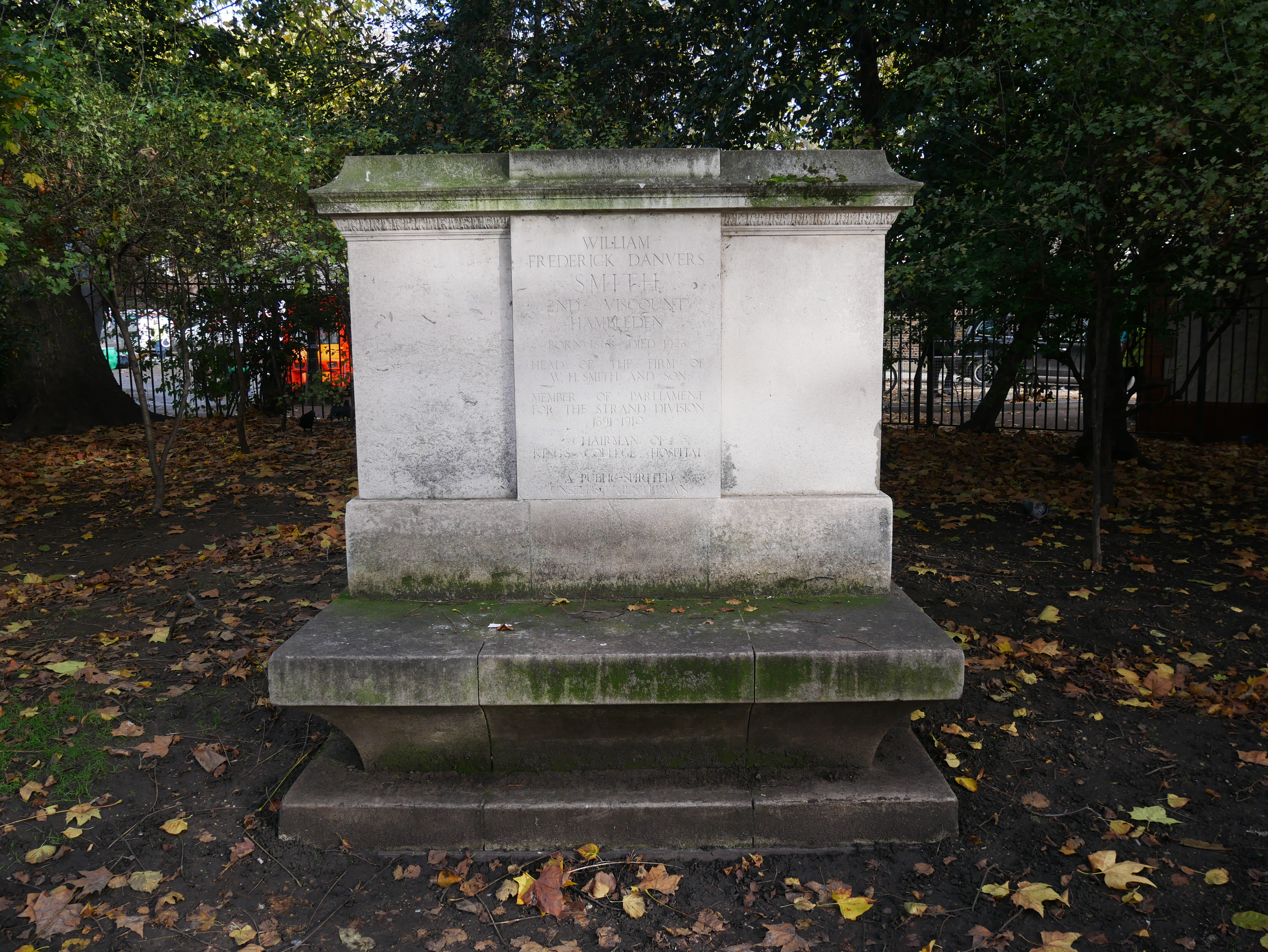
Monument to Smith in the gardens of Lincoln's Inn Fields, London

William Frederick Danvers Smith, 2nd Viscount Hambleden DL (12 August 1868 – 16 June 1928), known as Frederick Smith, was an English hereditary peer, businessman and politician. He studied at Eton and New College, Oxford.

== Life and career ==
Smith was involved in the management of the family business, W H Smith, which was founded by his grandfather, William Henry Smith. He inherited sole control of the business from his father in 1891 and passed it on to his son.

In 1891, he also succeeded his father William Henry Smith as Member of Parliament for the Strand constituency, holding the seat until January 1910. His rapid succession to the seat his father held in Parliament may have played a role in his being targeted for blackmail by the notorious poisoner Dr. Thomas Neill Cream, who (writing under an assumed name) claimed to have proof that Smith had poisoned a prostitute.

This was one of three known attempts at blackmail that may have been the real motive for Cream's string of poisonings in the Stepney and Lambeth areas of London from October 1891 to April 1892. They played a small role in the final arrest, prosecution and conviction of Cream at the Old Bailey in October 1892, and his execution the following month.

Smith was commissioned Lieutenant in the 2nd Buckinghamshire Rifle Volunteers (Eton College) in 1885, but resigned in 1887. In 1891 he was commissioned Second Lieutenant in the Royal 1st Devon Yeomanry. He was promoted Lieutenant in 1892, Captain in 1895, Major 10 February 1902, and Lieutenant-Colonel in 1914. He served with the Imperial Yeomanry during the Boer War. Smith was made Honorary Colonel of the Royal Devon Yeomanry Artillery in 1922.

He succeeded his mother, Emily Smith, as Viscount Hambleden following her death in 1913. He married Esther Georgiana Caroline née Gore, a daughter of Arthur Gore, 5th Earl of Arran. Smith was succeeded by their son, William Henry Smith. They had four other children: Edith Mabell Emily (1901–1973), James Frederick Arthur (b. 1906), David John (1907–1976) and Margaret Esther Lucie (1908–1980). Smith was the main sponsor of the Victoria County History from 1909 until 1931. In May 1902, he was the first person to receive the honorary freedom of the borough of Henley-on-Thames, "in recognition of his valuable services to the borough and his munificent donation to the building fund of the new Town hall".

Parliament of the United Kingdom
Preceded by William Henry Smith	Member of Parliament for Strand; 1891–1910	Succeeded by Walter Long
Peerage of the United Kingdom
Preceded by Emily Smith	Viscount Hambleden; 1913–1928	Succeeded by William Smith
