= Viscount Hambleden =

Viscountcy in the Peerage of the United Kingdom

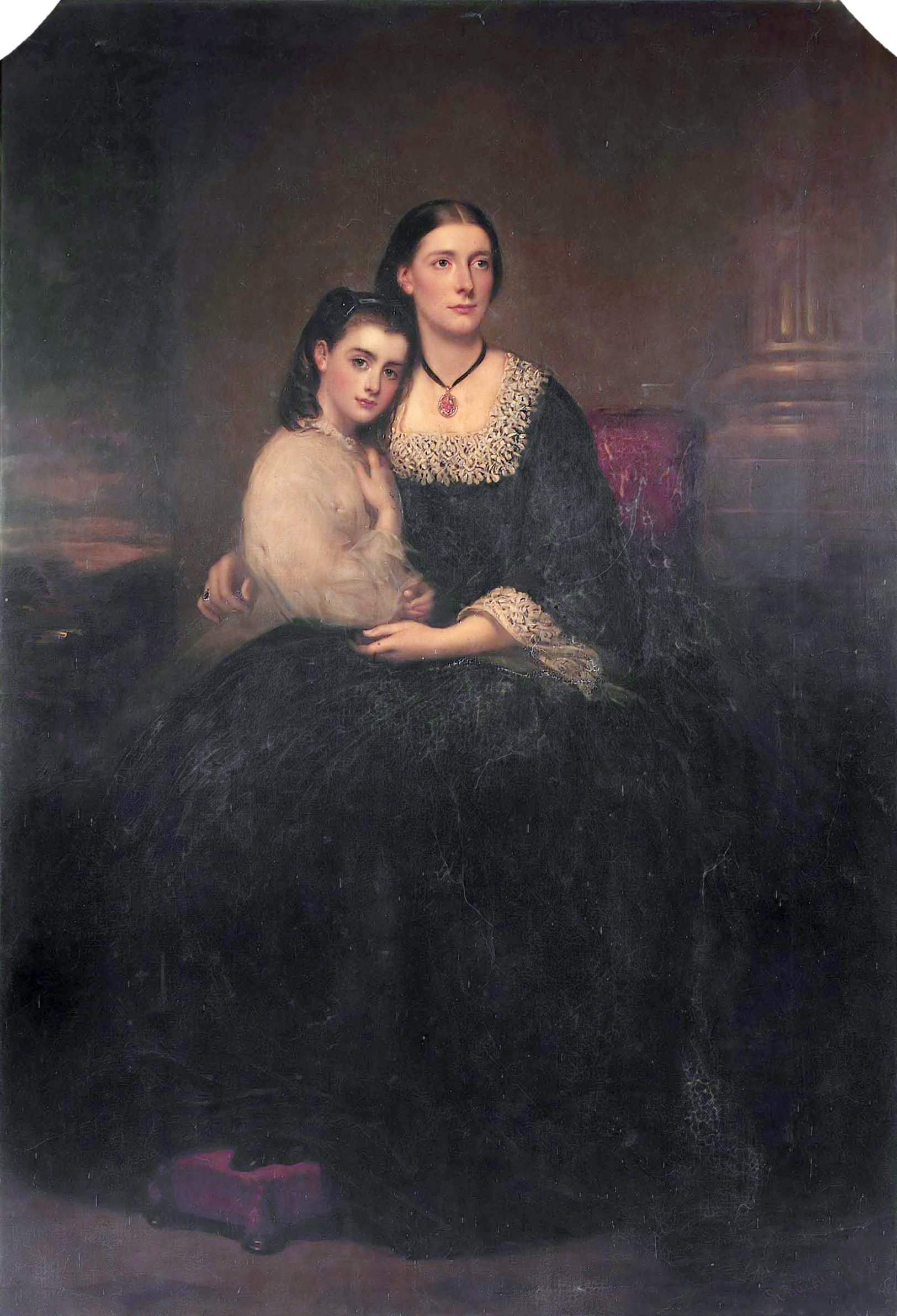
Emily, 1st Viscountess Hambleden, and her daughter (Richard Buckner)

Viscount Hambleden, of Hambleden in the County of Buckingham, is a title in the Peerage of the United Kingdom. It was created in 1891 (as Viscountess Hambleden) for Emily Danvers Smith, in honour of her deceased husband, the businessman and Conservative politician William Henry Smith. Both their son, the second Viscount, and grandson, the third Viscount, were involved in the management of the family business, the stationer and retailer W H Smith.

The title was created for Emily Smith and to the heirs male of her body.

As of 2017, the title is held by the 5th Viscount, who succeeded in 2012. Much of the family estate was sold in 2007, but the first wife of the late 4th Viscount, Maria Carmela Attolico di Adelfia, still lives in the Manor House at Hambleden, as of 2012.

== Viscounts Hambleden (1891) ==
Escutcheon of the Viscounts Hambleden

- Emily Danvers Smith, 1st Viscountess Hambleden (1828–1913)
- William Frederick Danvers Smith, 2nd Viscount Hambleden (1868–1928)
- William Henry Smith, 3rd Viscount Hambleden (1903–1948)
- William Herbert "Harry" Smith, 4th Viscount Hambleden (1930–2012)
- William Henry Smith, 5th Viscount Hambleden (b. 1955)

The heir presumptive is the present holder's brother Hon. Bernardo James Smith (b. 1957).

== Line of succession (selected) ==
- William Frederick Danvers Smith, 2nd Viscount Hambleden (1868–1928)
  - William Henry Smith, 3rd Viscount Hambleden (1903–1948)
    - William Herbert Smith, 4th Viscount Hambleden (1930–2012)
      - William Henry Smith, 5th Viscount Hambleden (b. 1955)
      - (1) Hon. Bernardo James Smith (b. 1957)
      - (2) Hon. Alexander David Smith (b. 1959)
      - (3) Hon. Nicolas Robin Bartolomeo Smith (b. 1960)
        - (4) Taro Smith (b. 1993)
        - (5) Kenji Smith (b. 1996)
      - (6) Hon. Lorenzo Patrick Harold Smith (b. 1962)
    - Hon. Richard Edward Smith (1937–2014)
      - (7) Christopher Richard Smith (b. 1975)
    - (8) Major Hon. Philip Reginald Smith (b. 1945)
      - (9) Thomas William Smith (b. 1976)
      - (10) James Edmund Philip Smith (b. 1983)
  - Lt.-Col. Hon. David John Smith (1907–1976)
    - Julian David Smith (1932–2015)
      - (11) Dickon Julian Henry Smith (b. 1972)
    - Antony Frederick Smith (1937-2021)
      - (12) James Antony David Smith (b. 1962)
      - (13) Philip Henry Smith (b. 1964)
    - (14) Peter Henry Smith (b. 1939)
      - (15) Charles Henry Smith (b. 1968)
    - (16) David Michael Smith (b. 1947)
      - (17) Jack Robert Smith (b. 1977)

== See also ==
- William Henry Smith
