= 1990 Birthday Honours (Queen Mother) =

British government recognitions

The British Birthday Honours 1990 included a number of honours and awards to celebrate the 90th Birthday of Queen Elizabeth the Queen Mother.

== Royal Victorian Order ==
=== Dame Grand Cross of the Royal Victorian Order (GCVO) ===
- Patricia, Dowager Viscountess Hambleden, DCVO.

=== Dame Commander of the Royal Victorian Order (DCVO) ===
- Frances Olivia Campbell-Preston, CVO.

=== Knight Commander of the Royal Victorian Order (KCVO) ===
- Major Arthur John Stewart Griffin, CVO.

=== Commander of the Royal Victorian Order (CVO) ===
- Major George Raymond Seymour, LVO.
- Charles Murray Kennedy St. Clair, Lord Sinclair, LVO.

=== Lieutenant of the Royal Victorian Order (LVO) ===
- Ian George Gill.

=== Member of the Royal Victorian Order (MVO) ===
- Captain Giles Anthony Caybourne Bassett, Irish Guards.

== Royal Victorian Medal ==
=== Royal Victorian Medal (Silver) ===
- Donald McCarthy
- Sergeant (Acting Pipe Major) John Frederick James Spoore, London Scottish.
