= Thomas Harwood (priest) =

English cleric, schoolmaster and antiquarian

Thomas Harwood D.D. (1767–1842) was an English cleric, schoolmaster and antiquarian.

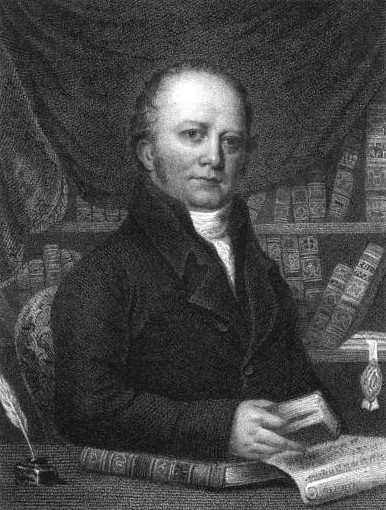
Thomas Harwood

== Life ==
Born on 18 May 1767 at Shepperton, Middlesex, a parish where his father and grandfather had been patrons and rectors, he went to Eton College on 18 November 1773, when only six years and a half old, and in September 1775 was admitted on the foundation. In 1784 he matriculated at University College, Oxford. In 1789 he was ordained deacon, and then entered Emmanuel College, Cambridge.

Headmaster of Lichfield grammar school from October 1791 till 1813, Harwood then moved within Lichfield to a house of his own. In 1800 he was appointed perpetual curate of Hammerwich, near Lichfield. He graduated B.D. at Cambridge in 1811, and in 1814 was presented, on his own nomination, to the rectory of Stawley, Somersetshire; but after two years there, he resigned the living in 1819, and returned to Lichfield. He was created D.D. of Cambridge in 1822, and for many years was a fellow of the Society of Antiquaries of London. He was presented in 1828 to the chapelry of Burntwood, which he served, together with Hammerwich, for the rest of his life.

Harwood died at Lichfield on 23 December 1842. In politics he was a Whig, and supported Catholic emancipation.

== Works ==
Harwood's works are:

- ‘The Death of Dion, a tragedy,’ in five acts and in verse, London, 1787, not acted.
- ‘The Noble Slave, a tragedy,’ in five acts and in verse, Bury St. Edmunds, 1788, 8vo. It was performed at Norwich theatre.
- ‘Annotations upon Genesis, with Observations, Doctrinal and Practical,’ London, 1789.
- ‘Sermons,’ 2 vols. 1794.
- ‘Alumni Etonenses; or a Catalogue of the Provosts and Fellows of Eton College and King's College, Cambridge, from the Foundation in 1443 to the year 1797, with an Account of their Lives and Preferments; collected from original MSS. and authentic biographical works,’ London, 1797.
- ‘The Sacred History of the Life of Jesus Christ, illustrative of the Harmony of the Four Evangelists,’ 1798.
- ‘Grecian Antiquities; or an Account of the Public and Private Life of the Greeks,’ London, 1801.
- ‘A Manual of Geography,’ 1804.
- ‘The History and Antiquities of the Church and City of Lichfield, containing its ancient and present state, civil and ecclesiastical,’ London, 1806.
- An edition of Sampson Erdeswicke's ‘Survey of Staffordshire … collated with manuscript copies and with additions and corrections,’ Westminster, 1820, and again, London, 1844.
- ‘Annotations, Ecclesiastical and Devotional: intended to illustrate the Liturgy and the XXXIX Articles of the United Church of England and Ireland; with an Historical Introduction,’ London, 1826.

== Family ==
Harwood married, in 1793, Maria, eldest daughter of Charles Woodward, and had a family of ten children.

== Notes ==
Attribution

This article incorporates text from a publication now in the public domain: Stephen, Leslie; Lee, Sidney, eds. (1891). "Harwood, Thomas". Dictionary of National Biography. Vol. 25. London: Smith, Elder & Co.
