= Sandon Hall =

Country mansion in Staffordshire, England

Coordinates: 52°51′21″N 2°3′55″W

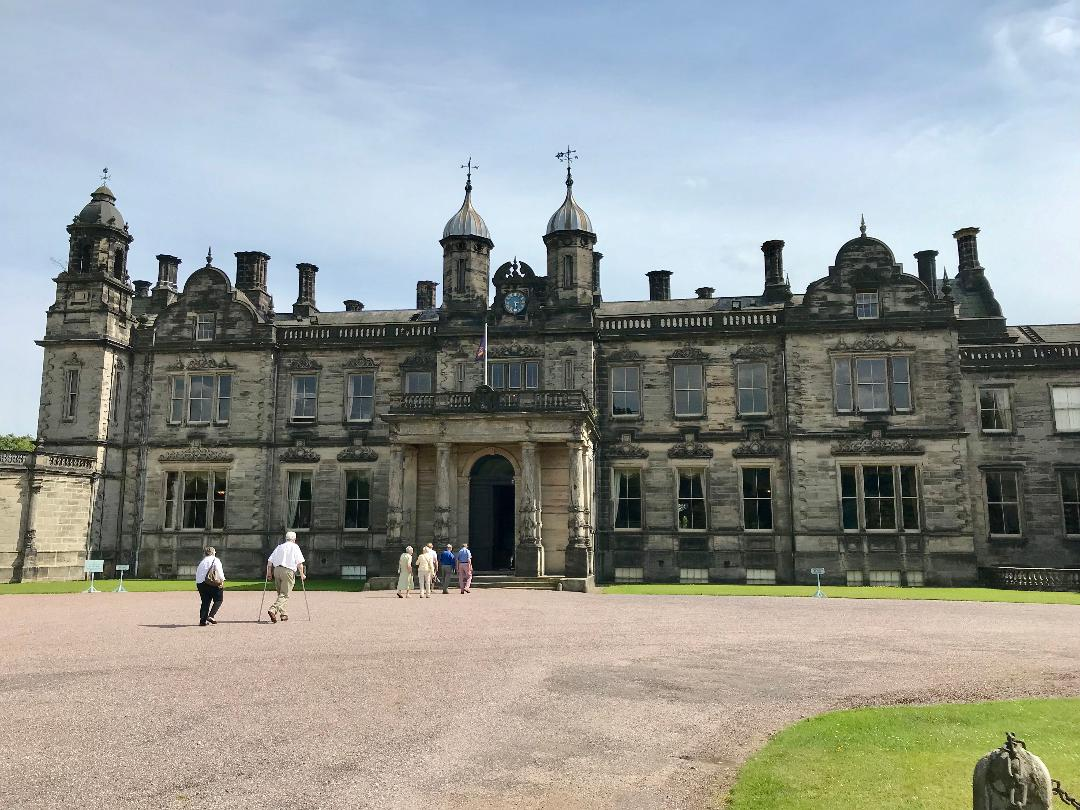
The present-day Sandon Hall, built 1852

Sandon Hall is a 19th-century country mansion, the seat of the Earl of Harrowby, at Sandon, Staffordshire, 5 miles (8.0 km) northeast of Stafford. It is a Grade II* listed building set in 400 acres (1.6 km^{2}) of parkland.

== Early manorial history ==
Before the Norman Conquest, Sandon was the property of Ælfgar, Earl of Mercia, but at the Conquest it fell into the king's hands, who bestowed it upon Hugh Lupus, Earl of Chester. From him it passed to William de Malbanc, of Nantwich, one of his barons. Adena, the great-granddaughter of William, gave it to Warren de Vernon, whose daughter Alditha conveyed it to Sir William Stafford, knight.

== Erdeswicke ==
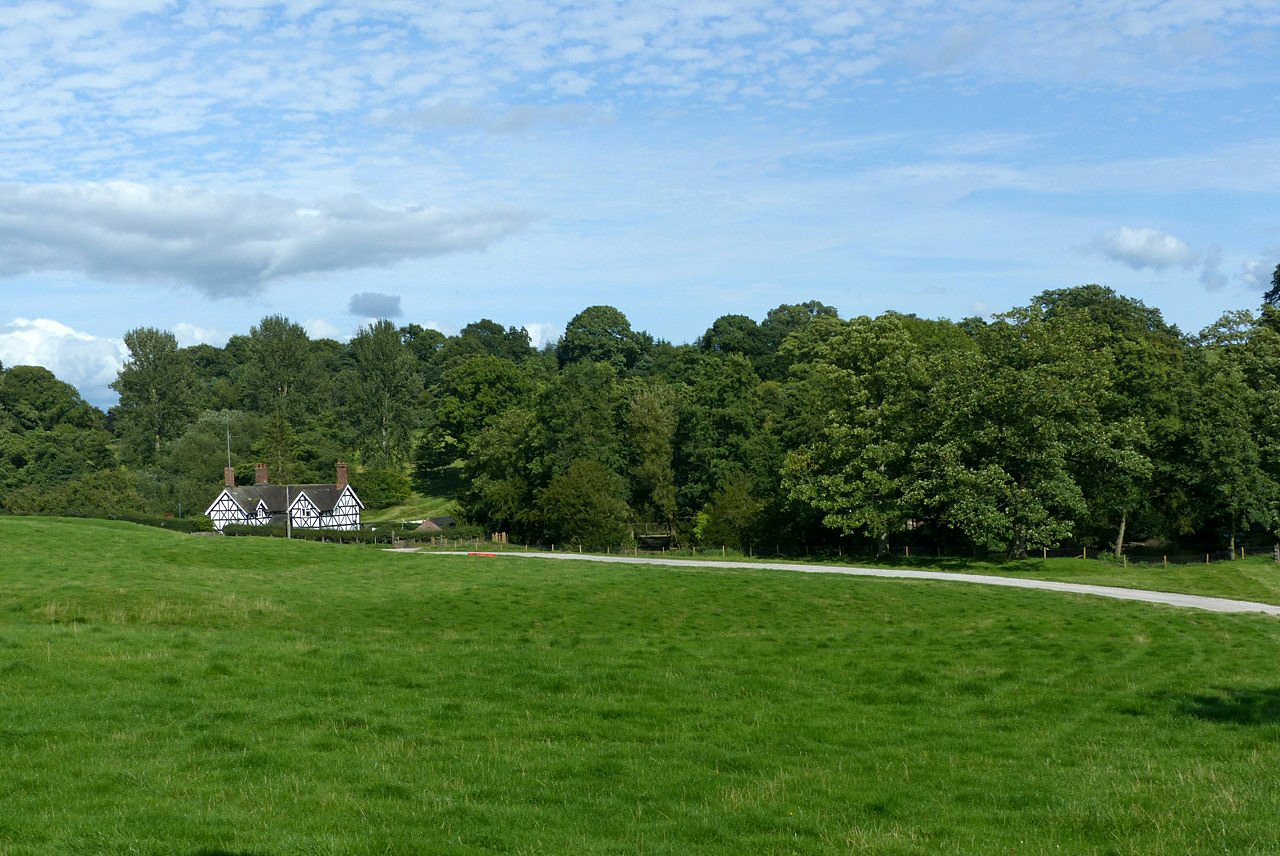
The site of Sandon Old Hall

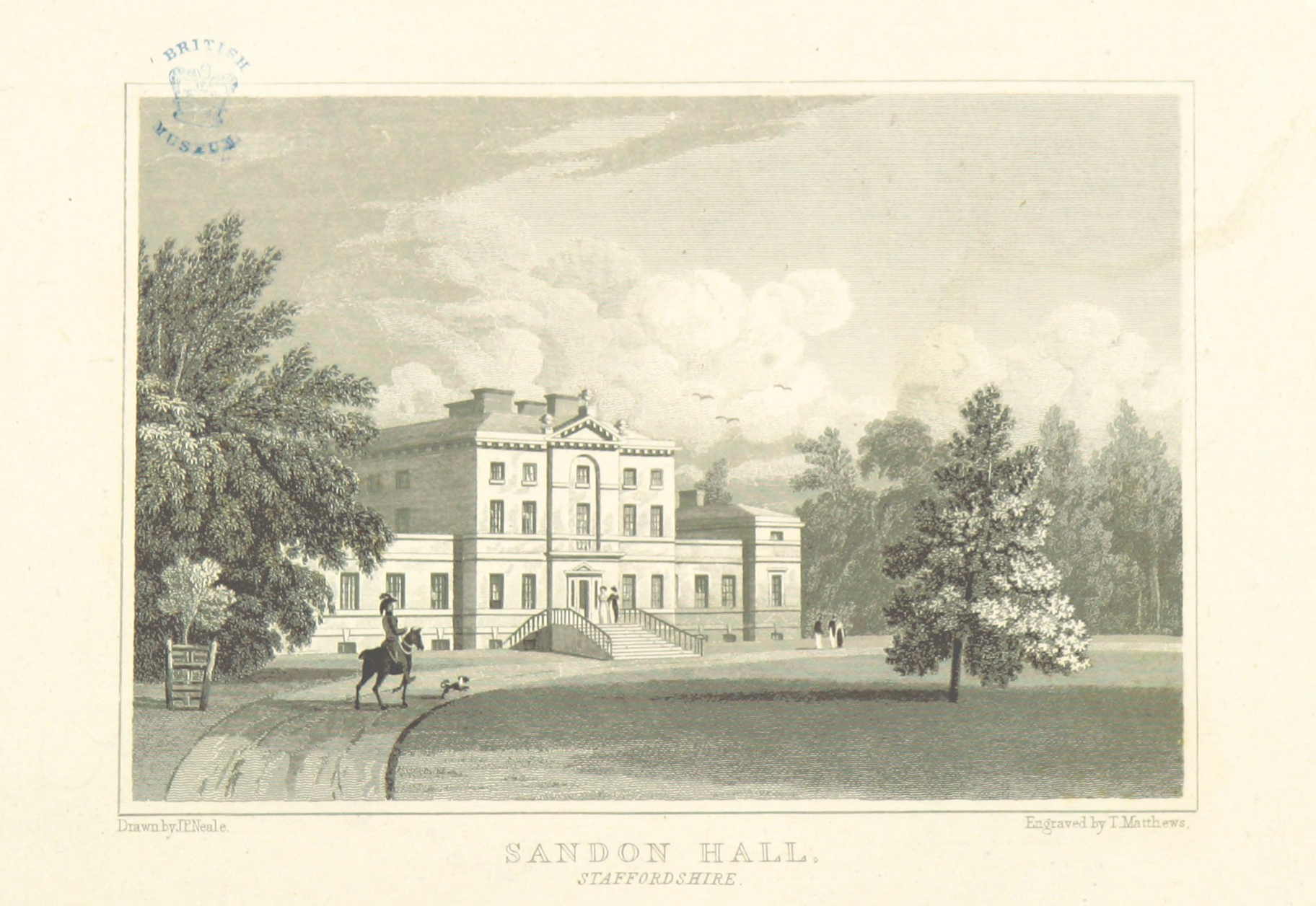
Sandon Hall in 1818

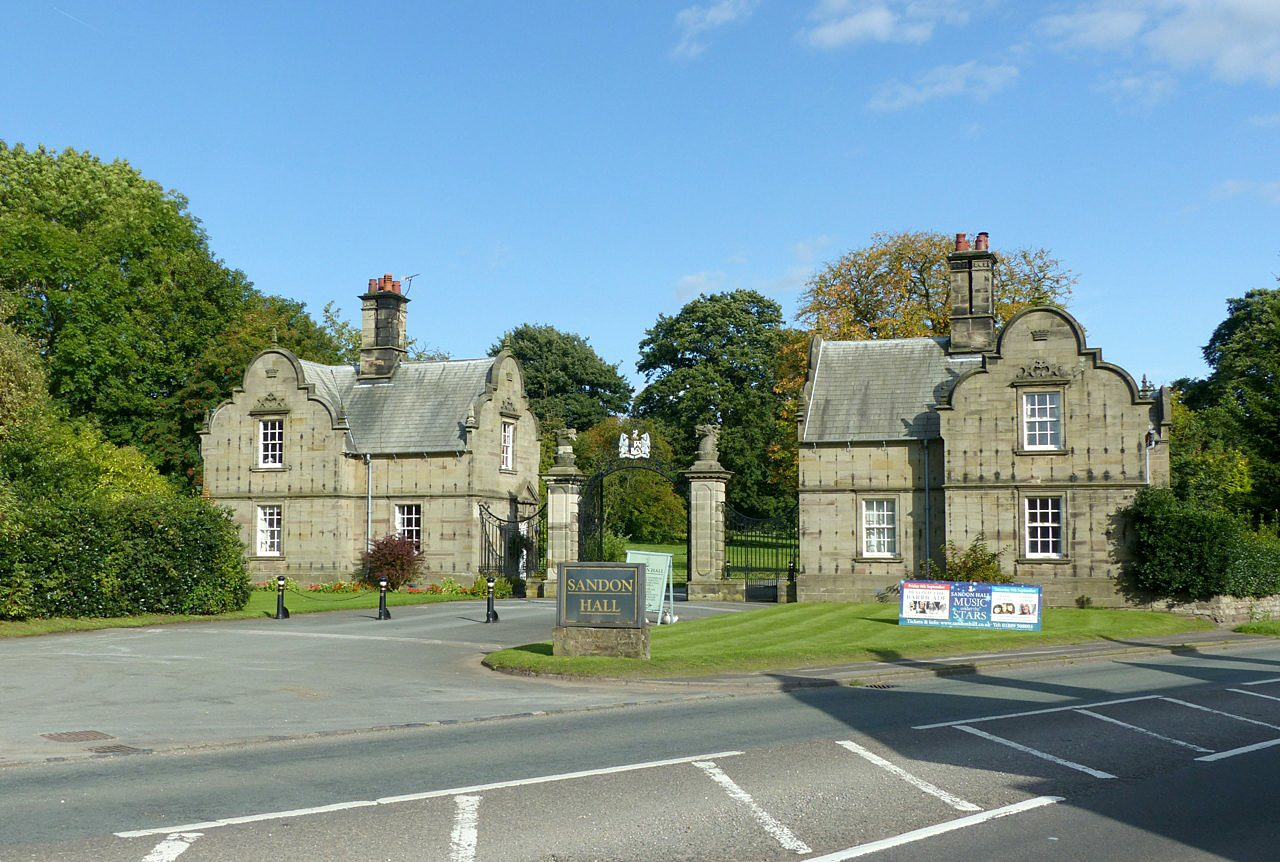
Stafford Lodges (1902) at the trance to the Sandon Estate

Margaret, daughter of one of the descendants of Sir William Stafford, carried the manor of Sandon by marriage to Thomas Erdeswicke in the 12th year of the reign of Edward III (1339). Thomas and Margaret had a son Thomas, whose four sons were Hugh, Robert, Sampson, and Henry. Hugh, Robert and Sampson all died without issue, but Henry had a son Hugh, who had issue another Hugh, and his sons were two brothers, Hugh and Sampson. Of these, Hugh Erdeswicke the elder brother died without issue: Sampson had issue Hugh, who was the father of Sampson Erdeswicke (the Staffordshire antiquary), who died in 1603. The tombs of the Erdeswickes are in Sandon parish church.

In 1593 the antiquary Sampson Erdiswicke married Mary Neale, widow of Everard Digby, Esquire (died 1592) of Tilton-on-the-Hill, Leicestershire, mother of that recusant Everard Digby who was executed in 1606 for his part in the Gunpowder Plot. Sampson and Mary Erdeswicke had three children: their heir was Richard Erdeswicke, M.P., who, to settle debts in the autumn of 1624, sold Sandon manor to his half-brother George Digby, Esq., of Sandon, although the purchase was not completed until 1631. Richard Erdeswicke died in Fleet debtors' prison and was buried in St. Brides, Fleet Street in July 1640. His son, named Sampson, died intestate in 1654.

== Hamilton ==
Jane, the surviving daughter and heiress of George Digby, Esq. of Sandon Hall, in 1660 married Charles Gerard, 4th Baron Gerard of Bromley (died 1667), and from them the manor house passed to their son Digby Gerard, 5th Baron Gerard (died 1684) (who married his kinswoman Elizabeth, daughter of Charles Gerard, 1st Earl of Macclesfield), and so to their daughter Elizabeth Gerard, duchess of James Hamilton, 4th Duke of Hamilton. A lawsuit concerning the estate was the pretext for a fatal duel between the 4th Duke and Lord Mohun in 1712, which led to the deaths of both men. The manor thereby descended to Archibald Hamilton, 9th Duke (1740–1819), grandson of the 4th Duke, for whom in 1769 the old moated manor-house was replaced by a new house built by Joseph Pickford of Derby.

== Ryder ==
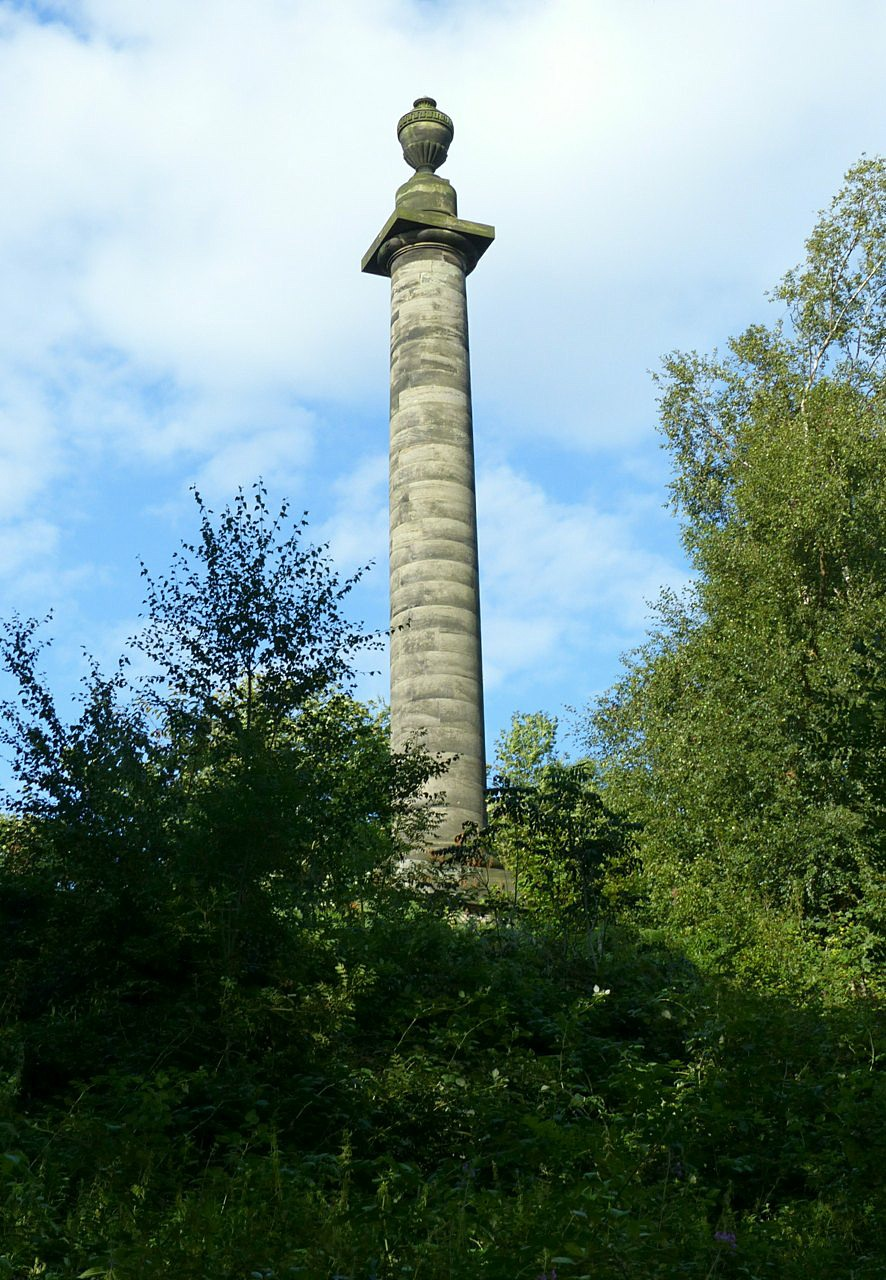
Pitt's Column, Sandon Park

The estate was purchased in 1776 by Nathaniel Ryder, 1st Baron Harrowby (1735–1803). The Hamiltons having torn down the interesting old home of the Erdiswickes, only to enjoy its replacement for less than a decade, the new owners found further causes for dissatisfaction, and retained the architect Samuel Wyatt to carry out large extensions and improvements. A flower-garden was created in 1781–1782 by the landscape gardener William Emes. But the innovations of Enlightenment could not escape the retribution of the offended spirit of Antiquity: the house was severely damaged by fire in 1848, and was then rebuilt in 1852 by Dudley Ryder, 2nd Earl of Harrowby to a neo-Jacobean design by architect William Burn.

In the park stands a Doric column erected in memory of William Pitt the Younger in 1806.

The current owners are Conroy Ryder, 8th Earl of Harrowby and Caroline Ryder, 8th Countess of Harrowby. They have renovated a public wing and fifty acres of gardens for weddings.

== See also ==
- Grade II* listed buildings in Stafford (borough)
- Listed buildings in Sandon and Burston
