= Sandon, Staffordshire =

Village in Staffordshire, England

Coordinates: 52.863°N 2.079°W

Sandon
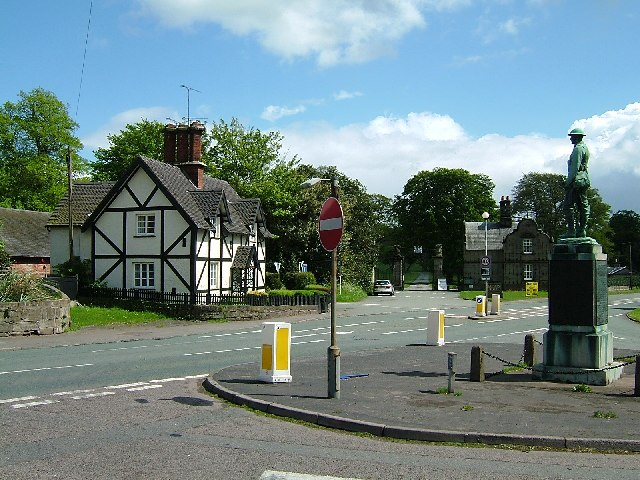
- Sandon village and war memorial

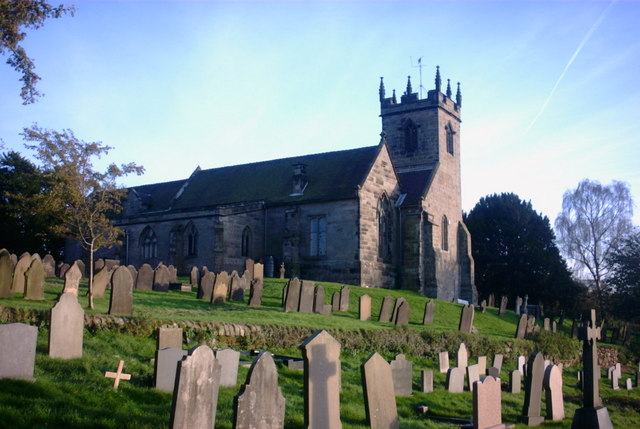
- All Saints' Parish Church

- Location within Staffordshire
- Population: 361 (2011)
- OS grid reference: SJ9429
- Civil parish: Sandon and Burston
- District: Stafford
- Shire county: Staffordshire
- Region: West Midlands
- Country: England
- Sovereign state: United Kingdom
- Post town: Stafford
- Postcode district: ST18
- Dialling code: 01889
- Police: Staffordshire
- Fire: Staffordshire
- Ambulance: West Midlands
- UK Parliament: Stone

Sandon is a village in the civil parish of Sandon and Burston, in the Stafford district, in the county of Staffordshire, England. It is about 4.5 miles (7 km) northeast of Stafford. The village is in the Trent Valley on the A51 road. On 6 September 1989 the parish was renamed from "Sandon" to "Sandon & Burston".

== Sandon Park ==
There is a rectangular moated site in Sandon Park, about 186 yards (170 m) northeast of the parish church. The site measures about 110 yards (100 m) by 87 yards (80 m) and the moat varies from 11 yards (10 m) to 16 yards (15 m) wide. It was the site of the parish's manor house, which was the home of the Erdeswick family from 1338 until the middle of the 17th century. The moat site is a scheduled monument.

In 1776 Nathaniel Ryder was ennobled as Baron Harrowby. He commissioned the architect Samuel Wyatt to transform the manor house into Sandon Hall and the landscape gardener William Emes to create a 400 acres (160 ha) park. Creating the park involved demolishing Sandon village, which was close to the house and parish church, and building a new village further away from the house and church.

In 1848 a workman on the roof of Sandon Hall accidentally set the building on fire, which caused such damage that it had to be demolished. The current Sandon Hall is a Jacobethan country house of nine bays built for Dudley Ryder, 2nd Earl of Harrowby in 1852. It was designed by the Scots Baronial architect William Burn — apart from the conservatory, which was added in 1864. Sandon Hall is a Grade II* listed building.

== Parish church ==
The Church of England parish church of All Saints was built in about 1200 and almost completely rebuilt about 1300. The north aisle was built in the 14th century, but was remodelled in 1851 as a family chapel for the Earls of Harrowby. The church was restored in 1923 under the direction of the architect W. D. Caroe. All Saints' is a Grade I listed building.

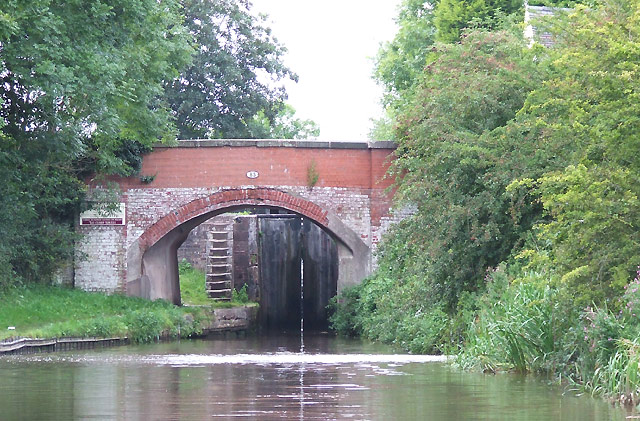
Bridge 83 and Sandon Lock on the Trent and Mersey Canal

== Economic history ==
The Trent and Mersey Canal passes through the area and was completed in 1777.

The North Staffordshire Railway opened the Stone to Colwich Line through Sandon in 1849. The London, Midland and Scottish Railway closed Sandon railway station in 1947 but the railway remains open as part of the West Coast Main Line.

== Amenities ==
Sandon has a public house, the Dog and Doublet Inn, that was designed by the architect Sir Guy Dawber and built in 1906.

Sandon has a village shop.

== See also ==
- Listed buildings in Sandon and Burston
