= Grade II* listed buildings in East Staffordshire =

There are over 20,000 Grade II* listed buildings in England. This page is a list of these buildings in the district of East Staffordshire in Staffordshire.

== East Staffordshire ==
Name	Location	Type	Completed (Note: The date given is the date used by Historic England as significant for the initial building or that of an important part in the structure's description.)	Date designated	Grid ref. (Note: The grid reference is based on the British national grid reference system, sometimes known as OSGB36, used by the Ordnance Survey.) Geo-coordinates	Entry number (Note: The "List Entry Number" is a unique number assigned to each listed building and scheduled monument by Historic England.)	Image
Church House	Abbots Bromley, East Staffordshire	House	Mid C20	10 January 1953	SK0794424630; 52°49′09″N 1°53′01″W	1038414	Upload Photo
Church of St Nicholas	Abbots Bromley, East Staffordshire	Parish Church	c. 1300	12 January 1966	SK0793524560; 52°49′07″N 1°53′01″W	1374461	Church of St Nicholas More images
The Butter Cross	Abbots Bromley, East Staffordshire	Village Cross	17th century	12 January 1966	SK0804224576; 52°49′07″N 1°52′56″W	1038424	The Butter Cross More images
Barton Hall	Barton-under-Needwood, East Staffordshire	House	Late 18th century	17 September 1952	SK1894218847; 52°46′01″N 1°43′15″W	1374405	Barton Hall
Church of St James	Barton-under-Needwood, East Staffordshire	Parish Church	1517	12 March 1964	SK1879218535; 52°45′51″N 1°43′23″W	1038545	Church of St James More images
5 Brookside Road	Barton-under-Needwood, East Staffordshire	House	Late Medieval	10 December 1958	SK1847218394; 52°45′46″N 1°43′40″W	1374402	Upload Photo
Lower Booth Farmhouse	Blithfield, East Staffordshire	Farmhouse	15th century	12 January 1966	SK0427027159; 52°50′31″N 1°56′17″W	1038401	Upload Photo
Main Gateway to Blithfield Hall with Flanking Walls	Blithfield Park, Blithfield, East Staffordshire	Gate	c. 1820	8 August 1985	SK0453623946; 52°48′47″N 1°56′03″W	1190043	Upload Photo
The Orangery, Blithfield Hall	Blithfield, East Staffordshire	Orangery	c. 1769	12 January 1966	SK0445723992; 52°48′48″N 1°56′07″W	1038399	Upload Photo
Claymills Pumping Station	Burton-on-Trent, East Staffordshire	Sewage Pumping Station	1886	3 January 1986	SK2629425873; 52°49′47″N 1°36′40″W	1038427	Claymills Pumping Station More images
Gates, Railings and Piers on West Side of Churchyard of Church of St Modwen	Burton-on-Trent, East Staffordshire	Gate	19th century	22 June 1979	SK2505922722; 52°48′05″N 1°37′47″W	1038710	Gates, Railings and Piers on West Side of Churchyard of Church of St Modwen
The Abbey (Burton Abbey Club)	Burton-on-Trent, East Staffordshire	Abbey	1004	24 March 1950	SK2510722601; 52°48′01″N 1°37′45″W	1213613	Upload Photo
181 Horninglow Street	Burton-on-Trent, East Staffordshire	House	Regency	24 March 1950	SK2520323354; 52°48′26″N 1°37′39″W	1038699	Upload Photo
182, Horninglow Street	Burton-on-Trent, East Staffordshire	House	Early 19th century	22 June 1979	SK2521523353; 52°48′26″N 1°37′39″W	1374342	Upload Photo
All Saints Vicarage	Denstone, East Staffordshire	Vicarage	1860-2	30 May 1985	SK0999940944; 52°57′57″N 1°51′09″W	1278479	Upload Photo
Church of All Saints	Denstone, East Staffordshire	Church	1949	30 May 1985	SK1003740901; 52°57′55″N 1°51′07″W	1230657	Church of All Saints More images
Lodge about 20m north of Triumphal Arch at Quixhill	Denstone, East Staffordshire	Lodge	Early 19th century	12 January 1966	SK1006441303; 52°58′08″N 1°51′06″W	1230718	Lodge about 20m north of Triumphal Arch at Quixhill More images
Lodge about 20m south of Triumphal Arch at Quixhill	Denstone, East Staffordshire	Lodge	Early 19th century	12 January 1966	SK1005641266; 52°58′07″N 1°51′06″W	1230589	Lodge about 20m south of Triumphal Arch at Quixhill More images
Triumphal Arch, Gates and Flanking Railings at Quixhill	Denstone, East Staffordshire	Gate	Early 19th century	12 January 1966	SK1005241286; 52°58′08″N 1°51′06″W	1230588	Triumphal Arch, Gates and Flanking Railings at Quixhill More images
Church of St Mary	Dunstall, East Staffordshire	Parish Church	1852-3	26 March 1986	SK1874020430; 52°46′52″N 1°43′25″W	1038486	Church of St Mary More images
Dunstall Hall and attached Orangery	Dunstall, East Staffordshire	Country House	Early 19th century	17 September 1952	SK1906020452; 52°46′53″N 1°43′08″W	1038487	Dunstall Hall and attached Orangery More images
Calwich Abbey Temple Flanking Bridges with Gates, Gate Piers and Railings	Calwich Park, Ellastone, East Staffordshire	Gate	1797	10 January 1953	SK1317743174; 52°59′09″N 1°48′19″W	1230741	Upload Photo
Church of St Peter	Ellastone, East Staffordshire	Church	1586	12 January 1966	SK1168043450; 52°59′18″N 1°49′39″W	1278444	Church of St Peter More images
Ellastone Old House	Upper Ellastone, Ellstone, East Staffordshire	House	Early to mid 18th century	10 January 1953	SK1173643273; 52°59′12″N 1°49′36″W	1230749	Ellastone Old House More images
Church of St Werburgh	Hanbury, East Staffordshire	Cross	Saxon	12 March 1964	SK1708427921; 52°50′55″N 1°44′52″W	1374435	Church of St Werburgh More images
Pair of Gate Piers and Seats in Terrace Garden South of Hoar Cross Hall	Hoar Cross, East Staffordshire	Gate Pier	c. 1600	1 November 1989	SK1234723047; 52°48′17″N 1°49′06″W	1374449	Pair of Gate Piers and Seats in Terrace Garden South of Hoar Cross Hall
Pair of Gatepiers and Gates to South Boundary of Terrace Garden at Hoar Cross Hall	Hoar Cross, East Staffordshire	Gate	c. 1700	1 November 1989	SK1234623007; 52°48′16″N 1°49′06″W	1038479	Upload Photo
Callowhill Hall	Kingstone, East Staffordshire	House	Late 17th century	10 January 1953	SK0497426388; 52°50′06″N 1°55′39″W	1374476	Callowhill Hall More images
Church of All Saints	Church Leigh, Leigh, East Staffordshire	Parish Church	Medieval	12 January 1966	SK0239035836; 52°55′12″N 1°57′57″W	1190204	Church of All Saints More images
Church View	Church Leigh, Leigh, East Staffordshire	House	C20	8 August 1985	SK0251935726; 52°55′08″N 1°57′50″W	1038374	Church View
Church of St Peter	Marchington, East Staffordshire	Parish Church	1742	12 January 1966	SK1379530728; 52°52′26″N 1°47′47″W	1190260	Church of St Peter More images
Marchington Hall	Marchington, East Staffordshire	House	c. 1690	10 January 1953	SK1346931011; 52°52′35″N 1°48′05″W	1374504	Marchington Hall
Woodroffe's Cottage	Marchington, East Staffordshire	Jettied House	Early 17th century	10 January 1953	SK1120629894; 52°51′59″N 1°50′06″W	1038342	Upload Photo
Old Hall Farmhouse	Picadilly, Mayfield, East Staffordshire	Farmhouse	1680	30 May 1985	SK1519346079; 53°00′43″N 1°46′30″W	1230785	Upload Photo
Old Hall Farmhouse, Garden Wall and Gate Piers	Middle Mayfield, Mayfield, East Staffordshire	Farmhouse	17th century	10 January 1953	SK1474644864; 53°00′03″N 1°46′54″W	1231004	Old Hall Farmhouse, Garden Wall and Gate Piers
Church of All Saints	Okeover Park, Okeover, East Staffordshire	Church	19th century	12 January 1966	SK1585148128; 53°01′49″N 1°45′54″W	1231030	Church of All Saints More images
Gates and railings enclosing south side of garden to west of Okeover Hall	Okeover Park, Okeover, East Staffordshire	Gate	c. 1740	10 January 1953	SK1568648102; 53°01′48″N 1°46′03″W	1231108	Upload Photo
Gates, Gate Piers, Steps and Walls to Kitchen Garden approx. 50 Yards North of Okeover Hall	Okeover Park, Okeover, East Staffordshire	Gate	Mid 18th century	30 May 1985	SK1579248247; 53°01′53″N 1°45′58″W	1278304	Upload Photo
Gates, piers and railings immediately north east of Okeover Hall	Okeover Park, Okeover, East Staffordshire	Gate	c. 1738	30 May 1985	SK1583048140; 53°01′49″N 1°45′55″W	1231116	Upload Photo
Inner gate piers, gates and railings to Okeover Hall	Okeover Park, Okeover, East Staffordshire	Gate	1756–59	30 May 1985	SK1586848161; 53°01′50″N 1°45′53″W	1231033	Inner gate piers, gates and railings to Okeover Hall More images
Okeover Hall	Okeover Park, Okeover, East Staffordshire	Country House	1745-9	10 January 1953	SK1580048118; 53°01′48″N 1°45′57″W	1231031	Okeover Hall More images
Outer gates and gate piers to Okeover Hall	Okeover Park, Okeover, East Staffordshire	Gate	c. 1740	30 May 1985	SK1612048153; 53°01′50″N 1°45′40″W	1277410	Outer gates and gate piers to Okeover Hall More images
Statue, sundial and steps approx. 30 yards north of Okeover Hall	Okeover Park, Okeover, East Staffordshire	Steps	1741	30 May 1985	SK1583648166; 53°01′50″N 1°45′55″W	1278305	Upload Photo
Temple of Pomona, Okeover Hall	Okeover Park, Okeover, East Staffordshire	Pavilion	c1737-48	30 May 1985	SK1583148296; 53°01′54″N 1°45′55″W	1231036	Temple of Pomona, Okeover Hall
Gate piers and courtyard walls to east of Wootton Lodge	Wootton Park, Ramshorn, East Staffordshire	Gate	17th century	10 January 1953	SK0964043792; 52°59′29″N 1°51′28″W	1231038	Upload Photo
Pair of pavilions to north east and south east corners of courtyard east of Wootton Lodge	Wootton Park, Ramshorn, East Staffordshire	Pavilion	17th century	10 January 1953	SK0963243774; 52°59′28″N 1°51′29″W	1278309	Upload Photo
Banks Farmhouse	Rocester, East Staffordshire	Farmhouse	Early 18th century	12 January 1966	SK0990838959; 52°56′53″N 1°51′14″W	1231926	Upload Photo
Cross approximately 40 Yards North of Church of St Michael	Rocester, East Staffordshire	Cross	13th century	12 January 1966	SK1117039394; 52°57′07″N 1°50′07″W	1231920	Cross approximately 40 Yards North of Church of St Michael More images
Church of St Paul	Shobnall, East Staffordshire	Parish Church	1874	24 March 1950	SK2390523462; 52°48′29″N 1°38′49″W	1288714	Church of St Paul More images
Sinai Park	Shobnall, East Staffordshire	Farmhouse	Mid 17th century	17 September 1952	SK2222123097; 52°48′18″N 1°40′19″W	1038484	Upload Photo
Church of St Mary	Stretton, East Staffordshire	Parish Church	1895-7	12 March 1963	SK2537426354; 52°50′03″N 1°37′29″W	1293648	Church of St Mary More images
Church of All Saints	Tatenhill, East Staffordshire	Chapel of Ease	1866-7	26 March 1986	SK1805522965; 52°48′14″N 1°44′01″W	1038436	Church of All Saints More images
Church of St Michael	Tatenhill, East Staffordshire	Parish Church	13th century	12 March 1964	SK2054422076; 52°47′45″N 1°41′48″W	1038433	Church of St Michael More images
The Old Rectory	Tatenhill, East Staffordshire	House	1999	17 September 1952	SK2055222101; 52°47′46″N 1°41′48″W	1038432	Upload Photo
Dog and Partridge Hotel	Tutbury, East Staffordshire	Coaching Inn	Late C15-Early 16th century	17 September 1952	SK2126628898; 52°51′26″N 1°41′08″W	1188498	Dog and Partridge Hotel More images
Bank House	Uttoxeter, East Staffordshire	House	Late 18th century	24 October 1950	SK0932033524; 52°53′57″N 1°51′46″W	1374326	Bank House More images
Dove Bridge	Uttoxeter, East Staffordshire	Road Bridge	15th century	13 September 1967	SK1055634465; 52°54′27″N 1°50′40″W	1237731	Dove Bridge More images
Parish Church of St Mary	Uttoxeter, East Staffordshire	Parish Church	14th century	24 October 1950	SK0932833485; 52°53′55″N 1°51′46″W	1038783	Parish Church of St Mary More images
The Manor House	Uttoxeter, East Staffordshire	House	Pre 1500	24 October 1950	SK0907033749; 52°54′04″N 1°52′00″W	1293560	The Manor House More images
25 Market Place	Uttoxeter, East Staffordshire	Timber Framed House	Medieval	8 January 1983	SK0923933372; 52°53′52″N 1°51′51″W	1372432	Upload Photo
Loxley Hall	Loxley Park, Uttoxeter Rural, East Staffordshire	House	Earlier than early 19th century	10 January 1953	SK0613232123; 52°53′12″N 1°54′37″W	1190360	Loxley Hall More images
Church of St Leonard	Wychnor, East Staffordshire	Parish Church	12th century	12 March 1964	SK1768816074; 52°44′31″N 1°44′22″W	1038440	Church of St Leonard More images
Church of St Peter	Yoxall, East Staffordshire	Parish Church	13th century	12 March 1964	SK1417019042; 52°46′08″N 1°47′29″W	1374422	Church of St Peter More images
Pear Tree Farmhouse	Yoxall, East Staffordshire	Farmhouse	Circa 14th century	28 October 1998	SK1423719305; 52°46′16″N 1°47′26″W	1038475	Pear Tree Farmhouse
Burton upon Trent war memorial	Burton upon Trent	War memorial	1922	22 June 1979	SK2497322594; 52°48′01″N 1°37′52″W	1288788	Burton upon Trent war memorial More images
