= St Peter's Church, Marchington =

Church in Staffordshire, England

Coordinates: 52.873856°N 1.796420°W

St Peter's, Marchington
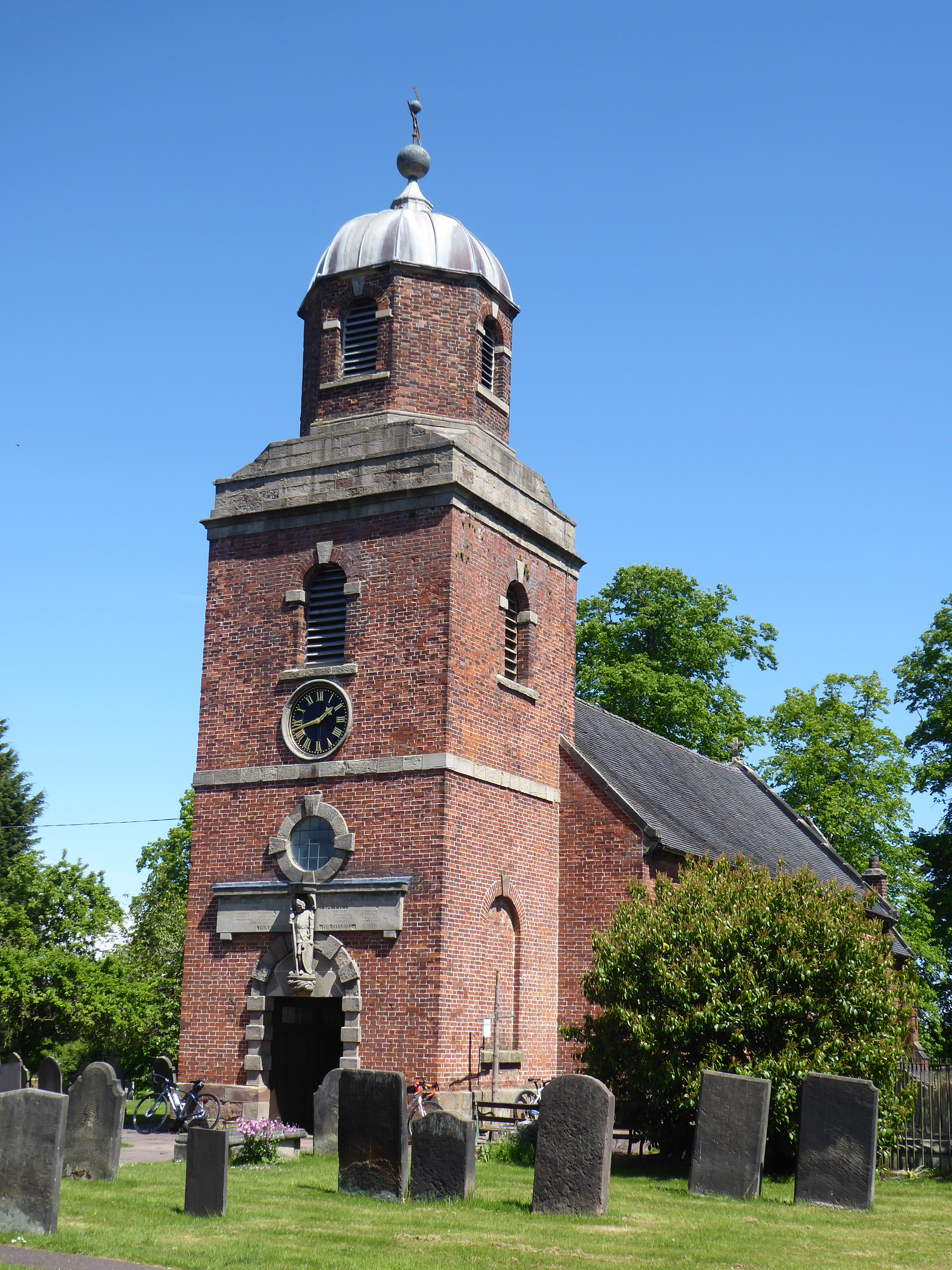
- St Peter's Church in 2019
- St Peter's, Marchington
- Denomination: Church of England
- Churchmanship: Anglican
- Website: St Peter's Church, Marchington

Administration
- Province: Province of Canterbury
- Diocese: Diocese of Lichfield

Clergy
- Vicar: Rev. Joe Cant

St Peter's Church is a Church of England church in Marchington, Staffordshire. It is the only church in the parish of St. Peter Marchington.

== History ==
The church was built in 1742 and was designed by Mark Parsons. A war memorial was added after the First World War.

== Today ==
St Peter's Church lies in the Deanery of Uttoxeter and the archdeaconry of Stoke-on-Trent. The Church is part of the Uttoxeter Area of parishes along with Bramshall, Checkley, Gratwich, Kingstone, Leigh, Marchington Woodlands, Stramshall, The Heath and Uttoxeter.

== See also ==
- Grade II* listed buildings in East Staffordshire
- Listed buildings in Marchington
