= Crakemarsh =

Coordinates: 52.926°N 1.863°W

- Hamlet
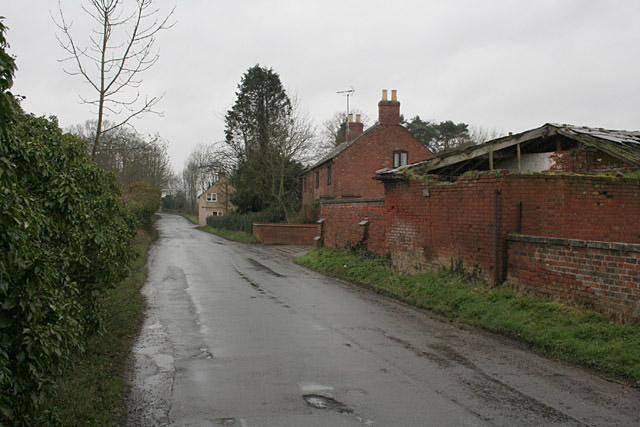

- Location within Staffordshire
- OS grid reference: SK0937
- Civil parish: Uttoxeter Rural
- District: East Staffordshire
- Shire county: Staffordshire
- Region: West Midlands
- Country: England
- Sovereign state: United Kingdom
- Post town: Uttoxeter
- Postcode district: ST14 5
- Dialling code: 01889 5
- Police: Staffordshire
- Fire: Staffordshire
- Ambulance: West Midlands

Crakemarsh is a small settlement in the civil parish of Uttoxeter Rural, in the East Staffordshire district, in Staffordshire, England, near the town of Uttoxeter.

The village is located close to the River Dove, approximately 0.5 miles (0.80 km) south of its confluence with the River Churnet.

The village has an entry in the 1086 Domesday Book under the name of Crachemers, and in the 1242 Book of Fees as Crakemers, both names meaning a marsh frequented by crakes.

== Crakemarsh Hall ==
Crakemarsh Hall was constructed around a staircase of a late 17th century manor house, thought to be the work of Grinling Gibbons, for Sir Thomas Cotton-Sheppard. Construction began in 1815 and was complete in 1820.

In the 1881 census, Tyrell William Cavendish is recorded as living at the hall, and again in the 1911 census with his wife Julia Florence Cavendish.

In 1912, Tyrell and Julia Cavendish, and her maid Ellen Mary Barber, travelled on the Titanic to visit Julia's father in Mamaroneck, New York. Tyrell Cavendish died when the ship sank and his body was later recovered by the Mackay-Bennett. Julia and Barber survived and returned to live at Crakemarsh Hall. Julia was a regular worshipper at Saint Michael and All Saints' church in Stramshall.

During the Second World War US troops were billeted at the hall.

Around 1948, Joseph Bamford rented premises at the hall before moving operations to Rocester. In the 1970s, JCB purchased the hall with intent to create an hotel for visitors. However, in December 1982 a fire damaged the building which was then left derelict. The Gibbons staircase had previously been removed and transferred to Wootton Lodge, also owned by the Bamford family.

The hall was demolished in 1998 but the North Lodge Gate House remains. In 2002, planning permission was granted with conditions for the construction of several residential properties.

== See also ==
- Listed buildings in Uttoxeter Rural
