= Listed buildings in Marchington =

Marchington is a civil parish in the district of East Staffordshire, Staffordshire, England. The parish contains 28 listed buildings that are recorded in the National Heritage List for England. Of these, three are listed at Grade II*, the middle grade, and the others are at Grade II, the lowest grade. The parish contains the villages of Marchington and Marchington Woodlands and the surrounding countryside. Most of the listed buildings are houses and cottages with associated structures, farmhouses and farm buildings, the earliest of which are timber framed. The other listed buildings include churches, memorials in a churchyard, a small country house, three mileposts, and a telephone kiosk.

== Key ==
Grade	Criteria
II*	Particularly important buildings of more than special interest
II	Buildings of national importance and special interest

== Buildings ==
Name and location	Photograph	Date	Notes	Grade
James House; 52.87419°N 1.80408°W	—	Late 16th to early 17th century	The house was remodelled and extended in the 18th century and restored in the 20th century. It has a timber framed core, it has been encased and extended in brick, and has a tile roof. There is a T-shaped plan, consisting of a hall range with two storeys and two bays, and a gabled cross-wing to the left with two storeys and an attic, a moulded first floor band, and a dentilled attic band. The windows are casements with segmental heads, and inside there are timber-framed partitions.	II
Woodroffe's Cottage; 52.86641°N 1.83494°W	—	Early 17th century	A timber framed house with a tile roof, two storeys and an attic, and a T-shaped plan, consisting of a front of three bays and a rear wing. The upper storey is jettied on moulded brackets, and has a moulded bressumer. The central doorway has an ogee head, and the windows are latticed casements.	II*
Christmas Cottage; 52.87217°N 1.81865°W		17th century	The cottage, which was later extended, is timber framed on a stone plinth, the extensions have applied timber framing, and the roof is thatched. There is one storey and an attic, the original part has two bays, the extension to the right also has two, and there is a long single-storey extension to the left. On the front is a gabled timber-framed porch with a thatched roof, the windows are casements, there are five dormers, with the roof sweeping over them, and the left extension has a five-light window.	II
Netherland Farmhouse; 52.87450°N 1.84731°W	—	17th century	The farmhouse was later extended. The original part is timber framed, the extension is in brick, and the roof is tiled. There is one storey and an attic, the original part has five bays, and the extension has two. The windows are casements, and there are gabled dormers with shaped and fretted bargeboards.	II
House occupied by Mr. Bagshaw, High Street; 52.87492°N 1.80171°W	—	17th century	The house is timber framed with repairs in brick and a tile roof. There are two storeys and an attic, and two bays. The central doorway has pilasters and a cornice hood, and the windows are casements.	II
St. Anne's Cottage; 52.87342°N 1.80829°W	—	Early 17th century	A pair of cottages later combined into one, it is timber framed on a sandstone plinth, and has a tile roof. There is one storey and an attic, and two bays. The windows are casements.	II
Houndhill Manor; 52.87096°N 1.79043°W	—	Mid to late 17th century	A farmhouse that was altered and extended later in the 17th century and in the 19th century. It is in red brick with stone dressings, and has a tile roof with coped verges on shaped kneelers. The original house has three storeys and an attic, a floor band and an ogee moulded cornice, the late 17th-century extension has two storeys and an attic, and the 19th-century part has a projecting three-storey porch with bands, moulded eaves and a cupola. The windows are mullioned, there are gabled dormers, and on the left gable end is a ball finial.	II
Gatepiers, gate and walls, Marchington Hall; 52.87627°N 1.80143°W		Late 17th century	Enclosing the garden at the front of the hall are coped brick walls. In the centre are rusticated stone gate piers with pineapple finials and wrought iron gates.	II
Marchington Hall; 52.87644°N 1.80132°W		c. 1690	The house, which was later expanded. is in red brick with stone dressings, quoins, and a tile roof with coped verges on kneelers. There are two storeys and attics, and two parallel ranges, a front of five bays, the outer pairs of bays gabled with ball finials, and between them is a moulded eaves cornice and a balustraded parapet. To the left is a 19th-century recessed one-storey four-bay wing, and a single-storey extension to the rear of it. Steps lead up to the central doorway that has a moulded surround, and a broken pediment containing a pineapple motif. The windows are cross windows with moulded surrounds, and above the ground floor windows is a continuous hood mould stepped over the doorway. At the rear, between the gables, is a clock with bells above.	II*
Thorn Tree Farmhouse; 52.87525°N 1.80575°W	—	Early to mid 18th century	A red brick farmhouse with floor bands and a tile roof. There are two storeys and an attic, two parallel ranges, a front of two gabled bays linked by a valley parapet, and a single-storey lean-to on the right. Some of the windows are casements with segmental heads, and others are sashes.	II
St Peter's Church; 52.87389°N 1.79642°W		1742	The chancel was rebuilt in the late 19th century. The church is built in red brick on a plinth, with stone dressings and a tile roof. The chancel is in Gothic style, and the rest of the church is Classical. The church consists of a nave, a chancel with a north vestry, and a west tower. The tower has two stages, and is surmounted by an octagonal cupola with a leaded roof, a ball finial, and a weathervane. The west doorway is round-headed and has a rusticated surround, a projecting corbel decorated with a dragon, and a statue of Saint George. Above it is an oculus, a band, and on the west side is a clock face with a moulded surround.	II*
Hall Croft Farmhouse; 52.87656°N 1.80279°W	—	Mid 18th century	The farmhouse is in brown brick with a tile roof. It has two storeys and an attic, and an L-shaped plan, with a front of two bays, and a rear wing with one storey and an attic. On the front is a gabled porch, and the windows are casements with segmental heads.	II
Stables northeast of Hall Croft Farmhouse; 52.87669°N 1.80245°W	—	18th century	The stables are in red brick with a tile roof, one storey, four bays, and a low extension to the right. It contains casement windows and boarded doors, all with segmental heads. On the left gable end are external wooden steps, and in the extension are stable doors. (Note: Street View in July 2011 shows that the stables have been converted for residential use.)	II
Sundial, Marchington Hall; 52.87672°N 1.80145°W	—	18th century (probable)	The sundial is in stone, and consists of a column with a square section surmounted by a ball finial and a weathervane.	II
Yew Tree Farmhouse, gate, railings and walls 52.87449°N 1.80350°W	—	Mid 18th century	A red brick farmhouse with a dentilled eaves course, and a tile roof with coped verges on shaped kneelers. There are three storeys and three bays. Steps lead up to the central doorway, which has fluted pilasters, a semicircular fanlight, a fluted frieze, and a cornice hood, and the windows are casements with wedge lintels. Partly enclosing the forecourt is a brick wall with a wrought iron gate and railings capped with urns.	II
Moatspring Farmhouse; 52.85984°N 1.84920°W	—	Mid to late 18th century	A red brick farmhouse that has a tile roof with coped verges. There are three storeys and a cruciform plan, with a main range and flanking wings. The windows are casements with segmental heads, and there is a lunette.	II
Field House; 52.87276°N 1.81127°W	—	Late 18th century	A red brick house with a moulded cornice, a coped parapet ramped down from the centre, and a hipped tile roof. There are two storeys, and a front of five bays, the two middle bays flanked by slightly projecting wings. The centre has a three-bay lean-to shelter and a single-storey porch, and the left wing is bowed. In the left wing is a French casement window, and the other windows are sashes.	II
Tetley House; 52.87647°N 1.80100°W	—	Early 19th century	The rebuilding of a 17th-century house, it is in red brick with dentilled eaves and a hipped tile roof. There are three storeys and three bays. The central doorway has a moulded surround, a rectangular fanlight, and a cornice hood. The windows are sashes with wedge lintels grooved as voussoirs, and raised keystones.	II
Francis Calvert Memorial and railings 52.87400°N 1.79645°W	—	c. 1831	The memorial is in the churchyard of St Peter's Church, and is to the memory of Francis Calvert. It is a double slab tomb, and is surrounded by wrought iron railings.	II
Thomas Pickering Memorial and railings 52.87380°N 1.79654°W	—	c. 1834	The memorial is in the churchyard of St Peter's Church, and is to the memory of Thomas Pickering. It is a double slab tomb, the slabs having moulded edges, and is surrounded by wrought iron railings.	II
The Old Vicarage; 52.87033°N 1.80850°W	—	Early to mid 19th century	The vicarage, later a private house, it is in red brick with a hipped slate roof. There are two storeys and an attic, and three bays. On the front is a porch, the windows are sashes with wedge lintels, and at the rear is a gabled dormer.	II
Milepost outside Lower Brook House; 52.87154°N 1.82528°W		19th century	The milepost is on the south side of the B5017 road. It is in cast iron, and has a triangular section and a chamfered top. On the top is "MARCHINGTON", and on the faces are the distances to Uttoxeter, Marchington, and Burton upon Trent.	II
St John's Church; 52.86429°N 1.83862°W		1858–59	The church is in stone and has a tile roof with crested ridge tiles. It consists of a nave, a south porch, a chancel with north and south chapels, and a northwest steeple. The steeple has a four-stage tower and a broach spire, a north door with a pointed arch, and a semi-octagonal projection to the east. The porch is in timber, and is gabled with shaped and fretted bargeboards.	II
Chawner Cottages and wall 52.87597°N 1.80156°W	—	1860	A row of former almshouses in red brick with stone dressings, and a shaped tile roof with coped verges on shaped kneelers. There is one storey and an attic, and three bays. In the centre is a projecting gabled porch with a segmental pointed arch and a returned hood mould, above which is an inscription and date. The doorways have segmental pointed heads and hood moulds stepped over blind shields. The windows are casements with lattice glazing and straight hood moulds. The front garden is enclosed by a low coped wall.	II
Milepost at N.G.R. SK 10353087; 52.87532°N 1.84813°W		Mid to late 19th century	The milepost is on the south side of the B5017 road. It is in cast iron, and has a triangular section and a chamfered top. On the top is "UTTOXETER", and on the faces are the distances to Uttoxeter, Marchington, and Burton upon Trent.	II
Milepost at N.G.R. SK 13113009; 52.86827°N 1.80688°W		Mid to late 19th century	The milepost is on the west side of the B5017 road. It is in cast iron, and has a triangular section and a chamfered top. On the top is "MARCHINGTON", and on the faces are the distances to Uttoxeter, Marchington, and Burton upon Trent.	II
Smallwood Manor; 52.86667°N 1.84964°W	—	1886	A small country house, later used as a school, designed by Robert William Edis in Elizabethan style. It is in red brick with yellow terracotta dressings and a tile roof. There are two storeys and an attic, and five bays. All but the right bay have shaped gables, and the middle bay and the bay to the right of it have semicircular pediments with finials. In the centre is a porch higher than the bays and flanked by octagonal turrets with shaped caps. The entrance is round-headed and is flanked by smaller round-headed arches with fanlights. The windows are mullioned and transomed with moulded surrounds.	II
Telephone kiosk 52.87577°N 1.80126°W	—	1935	A K6 type telephone kiosk, designed by Giles Gilbert Scott. Constructed in cast iron with a square plan and a dome, it has three unperforated crowns in the top panels.	II

== Notes and references ==
=== Sources ===
- Historic England, "James House, Marchington (1374502)", National Heritage List for England
- Historic England, "Woodroffe's Cottage, Marchington (1038342)", National Heritage List for England
- Historic England, "Christmas Cottage, Marchington (1038380)", National Heritage List for England
- Historic England, "Netherland Farmhouse, Marchington (1293828)", National Heritage List for England
- Historic England, "House occupied by Mr. Bagshaw, Marchington (1038341)", National Heritage List for England
- Historic England, "St. Anne's Cottage, Marchington (1190254)", National Heritage List for England
- Historic England, "Houndhill Manor, Marchington (1038343)", National Heritage List for England
- Historic England, "Gatepiers, gate and attached walls immediately South of Marchington Hall, Marchington (1190322)", National Heritage List for England
- Historic England, "Marchington Hall, Marchington (1374504)", National Heritage List for England
- Historic England, "Thorn Tree Farmhouse, Marchington (1190252)", National Heritage List for England
- Historic England, "Church of St. Peter, Marchington (1190260)", National Heritage List for England
- Historic England, "Hall Croft Farmhouse, Marchington (1374503)", National Heritage List for England
- Historic England, "Stables approximately 15 yards north-east of Hall Croft Farmhouse, Marchington (1038346)", National Heritage List for England
- Historic England, "Sundial approximately 20 yards north of Marchington Hall, Marchington (1038347)", National Heritage List for England
- Historic England, "Yew Tree Farmhouse with gate, railings and walls to forecourt, Marchington (1038383)", National Heritage List for England
- Historic England, "Moatspring Farmhouse, Marchington (1190272)", National Heritage List for England
- Historic England, "Field House, Marchington (1038345)", National Heritage List for England
- Historic England, "Tetley House, Marchington (1374505)", National Heritage List for England
- Historic England, "Francis Calvert Memorial and railings approximately 5 yards north of chancel of Church of St. Peter, Marchington (1038381)", National Heritage List for England
- Historic England, "Thomas Pickering Memorial and railings approximately 6 yards south of west tower of Church of St. Peter, Marchington (1038382)", National Heritage List for England
- Historic England, "The Old Vicarage, Marchington (1190323)", National Heritage List for England
- Historic England, "Milepost outside Lower Brook House, Marchington (1392731)", National Heritage List for England
- Historic England, "Church of St. John, Marchington (1374501)", National Heritage List for England
- Historic England, "Chawner Cottages and garden wall, Marchington (1038344)", National Heritage List for England
- Historic England, "Milepost at N.G.R. SK 10353087, Marchington (1038359)", National Heritage List for England
- Historic England, "Milepost at N.G.R. SK 13113009, Marchington (1038379)", National Heritage List for England
- Historic England, "Smallwood Manor, Marchington (1038378)", National Heritage List for England
- Historic England, "Telephone Kiosk, Marchington (1271151)", National Heritage List for England
- Historic England, Listed Buildings
- Pevsner, Nikolaus (1974), Staffordshire, The Buildings of England, Harmondsworth: Penguin Books, ISBN 0-14-071046-9
