= Listed buildings in Leigh, Staffordshire =

Leigh is a civil parish in the district of East Staffordshire, Staffordshire, England. It contains 20 buildings that are recorded in the National Heritage List for England. Of these, two are listed at Grade II*, the middle grade, and the others are at Grade II, the lowest grade. The parish contains the villages of Church Leigh, Lower Leigh, Upper Leigh, and Withington and smaller settlements, and is otherwise rural. Most of the listed buildings in the parish are houses, cottages, and farmhouses, and the others include a church, memorials in the churchyard, a school, and three mileposts.

== Key ==
Grade	Criteria
II*	Particularly important buildings of more than special interest
II	Buildings of national importance and special interest

== Buildings ==
Name and location	Photograph	Date	Notes	Grade
Church Cottages; 52.92075°N 1.96436°W	—	17th century	A pair of cottages that were later extended. The original part is timber framed, and the later part is red brick. There is one storey and an attic, three bays, and a single-storey extension to the right. The windows are casements with segmental heads, and there are two gabled dormers. Inside there is an inglenook fireplace with a timber bressumer.	II
Church View; 52.91889°N 1.96390°W	— Church View, Leigh	17th century	A timber framed house with brick infill on a stone plinth with a tile roof. Thee is one storey and an attic, three bays, and a later brick extension to the right. The windows are casements, and there are two dormers with the roof sweeping over them.	II*
Moor House Farmhouse; 52.92555°N 1.98622°W	—	17th century	The farmhouse was rebuilt in the 18th century, retaining some of its original timber framing. The rest is in red brick with a stepped eaves band, and a tile roof with coped verges on shaped kneelers. There are two storeys and an attic, and an L-shaped plan, consisting of a 17th-century rear wing, a parallel 19th-century rear wing, and a main range with four bays. The doorway has pilasters and an entablature, and the windows are casements with keystones and aprons.	II
Nobut Hall; 52.91994°N 1.94220°W	—	17th century	The farmhouse, which has been altered and extended, is timber framed on a sandstone plinth, the south front is roughcast, and the roof is tiled. There are two storeys, three bays, a stair wing on the north front, an east wing at right angles, and a single-storey brick extension on the left. The windows are casements, and the doorway has pilasters and a bracketed hood. Inside there is an inglenook fireplace.	II
Manor Farmhouse; 52.92380°N 1.97823°W	—	Late 17th century (probable)	The farmhouse is in red brick with stone dressings and a tile roof. There is one storey and an attic, and two bays. The central doorway has a massive stone lintel, on the front the windows are casements with rebated surrounds and hood moulds, there is one gabled dormer, and in the left gable end is a four-light window with chamfered mullions.	II
Brook Farmhouse, wall and gate piers 52.91993°N 1.97860°W	—	1694	The farmhouse was later extended and altered. It is in red brick on a stone plinth with stone dressings, quoins, and a tile roof with coped verges on shaped kneelers. The main range has two bays and a stair turret projecting from the centre, there is a wing projecting to the south at the west end, and an extension to the northeast corner. The main part has two storeys and an attic, a moulded band and a moulded eaves cornice, and the wing has two storeys and four bays. The central doorway has a moulded surround and a massive dated and initialled lintel, and the windows are casements with shaped keystones, some with segmental heads. Enclosing the garden is a coped brick wall and square gate piers with moulded caps.	II
Stone House Farmhouse; 52.91609°N 1.95600°W	Stone House Farmhouse, Leigh	1719	The farmhouse was extended in the 19th century. It is in stone with extensions in red brick, a band, coved eaves, and a tile roof with coped verges on kneelers. There are two storeys, roughly an L-shaped plan, three bays, and a rear wing. The central doorway has a moulded surround, a dated and initialled lintel, and a bracketed hood. The windows have moulded surrounds and contain casements with mullions.	II
Keeling family memorial 52.91971°N 1.96585°W	—	18th century	The memorial is in the churchyard of All Saints Church, and is to the memory of members of the Keeling family. It is a chest tomb in stone with slate panels on the ends and sides. The tomb has a moulded base, a moulded top, corner pilasters with gadrooned bases and half-pilasters with gadrooned bases.	II
Memorial south of south aisle 52.91976°N 1.96590°W	—	18th century	The memorial is in the churchyard of All Saints Church, and is a chest tomb in stone. It has a moulded base, a moulded top, panelled sides, and corner pilasters with bulbous bases.	II
Moor Farmhouse; 52.92617°N 1.98258°W	—	18th century	A red brick farmhouse with a band and a tile roof with coped verges. There are two storeys and an attic, and three bays. In the centre is a lean-to porch, and the windows are casements with segmental heads.	II
Park Hall; 52.92766°N 1.96055°W	—	18th century	A rendered house with a bands and a hipped tile roof. There are two storeys and an attic, three bays, and a lower two-storey recessed wing to the right. It has a central doorway, and the windows are casements.	II
Bridge, gate piers and gate, Park Hall; 52.92736°N 1.96061°W	—	18th century	The bridge crosses a moat, it is in stone, and consists of two segmental-headed arches. The gate piers are panelled and have oversailing caps, and the gates, which are in wrought iron, have a decorative surround and an overthrow.	II
The Old Rectory; 52.92093°N 1.96597°W	—	Mid 18th century	The rectory, later a private house, was remodelled in the 19th century. It is in red brick on a stone plinth, with stone dressings and a tile roof. There are two storeys and an attic, five bays, a main range, and two parallel rear ranges. In the centre is a gabled porch with a Tudor arch and decorative bargeboards, and a doorway with a scrolled keystone. To the left is a 10-light bay window with chamfered mullions and transoms. The other windows are sashes with fluted keystones.	II
Birchwood Park; 52.90234°N 2.00126°W	—	Early 19th century	Originally a hunting lodge, the farmhouse is in red brick with a hipped tile roof. There are three storeys, three bays, a low single-story projection to the left, and a low lean-to on the right, both with hipped roofs. The windows are casements with segmental heads.	II
Checkley Bank Farmhouse; 52.93616°N 1.96316°W	—	c. 1840	The farmhouse is in red brick with stone dressings, quoins, and a slate roof with coped verges. It is in Tudor style, and has two storeys and a T-shaped plan with a front of three bays. In the centre is a gabled porch with a four-centred arch and a hood mould. The windows have chamfered mullions, those in the ground floor with hood moulds. On the right gable is a ball finial.	II
All Saints Church; 52.91989°N 1.96569°W	All Saints Church, Leigh	1846	The church was rebuilt, incorporating part of the medieval tower, and is in Decorated style. It is in stone with a slate roof, and has a cruciform plan, consisting of a nave, north and south aisles, a south porch, north and south transepts, a chancel, and a tower at the crossing with an embattled parapet.	II*
Milepost outside Park View; 52.89371°N 1.99365°W		19th century	The milepost is on the north side of the B5027 Road. It is in cast iron and has a triangular plan and a chamfered top, On the top is inscribed "FRADSWELL PARISH" and on the sides are the distances to Bramshall, Uttoxeter, Milwich, and Stone.	II
The Old Boys School, Schoolhouse and privies 52.92192°N 1.96664°W	—	1856–57	The school, schoolmaster's house and privies were designed by G. E. Street. They are in red brick with decoration in blue brick, stone dressings, and a tile roof with crested ridge tiles. The house is to the left, it has an L-shaped plan with a projecting gabled wing. The schoolroom to the right also has an L-shaped plan and a projecting gable, and the privies are in the angle with the schoolroom. The house has two storeys, a stair turret, a doorway with a pointed head, and mullioned windows. In the gable end of the schoolroom is a four-light window with a pointed head, in the bay to the left is a porch flanked by fixed-light windows, and above is a gabled dormer.	II
Milepost at N.G.R. SK 02053322; 52.89649°N 1.97110°W		Mid to late 19th century	The milepost is on the north side of the B5027 Road. It is in cast iron and has a triangular plan and a chamfered top, On the top is inscribed "FIELD PARISH" and on the sides are the distances to Bramshall, Uttoxeter, Milwich, and Stone.	II
Milepost at N.G.R. SK 03453391; 52.90271°N 1.94887°W		Mid to late 19th century	The milepost is on the north side of the B5027 Road. It is in cast iron and has a triangular plan and a chamfered top, On the top is inscribed "FIELD PARISH" and on the sides are the distances to Bramshall, Uttoxeter, Milwich, and Stone.	II
