= Marchington Woodlands =

Village in Staffordshire, England

Coordinates: 52.855°N 1.828°W

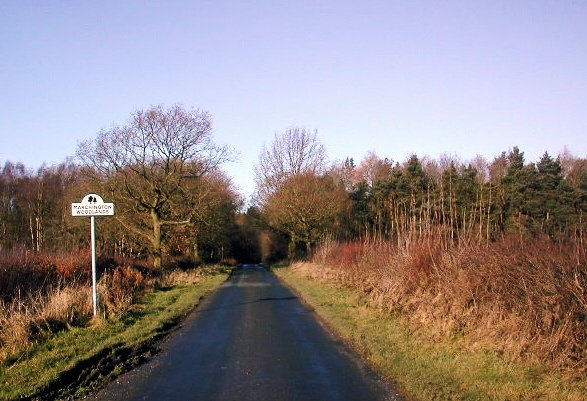
- One of the Roads into Marchington Woodlands

- Location within Staffordshire
- Population: 250 (2001)
- OS grid reference: SK116286
- Civil parish: Marchington
- District: East Staffordshire
- Shire county: Staffordshire
- Region: West Midlands
- Country: England
- Sovereign state: United Kingdom
- Post town: Uttoxeter
- Postcode district: ST14
- Dialling code: 01889, 01283
- Police: Staffordshire
- Fire: Staffordshire
- Ambulance: West Midlands
- UK Parliament: Burton

Marchington Woodlands is a village in the civil parish of Marchington, in the East Staffordshire district, in the county of Staffordshire, England. It has a church and a village hall. The local first school was closed in 1981 and the building was converted into a private home. Marchington Woodlands consists mostly of farms and cottages. it is often Referred to by locals as The Woodlands. It is located near Uttoxeter.

== History ==
Marchington Woodlands became a village in 1859 with the opening of the Parish church.

== Governance ==
Marchington Woodlands is part of the Crown ward in East Staffordshire and is represented by the Conservative Charles Hardwick. And the Dove ward in Staffordshire County council and is represented by Bob Fraser who is also Conservative.

Marchington Woodlands is part of the Burton constituency in the House of Commons. Prior to Brexit in 2020 it was part of the West Midlands constituency and was represented by 6 MEPs.

Marchington Woodlands became a parish in 1866, on 1 April 1934 the parish was abolished and merged with Marchington, Anslow, Hanbury, Newborough and Tatenhill. In 1931 the parish had a population of 273.

== Geography ==
Marchington Woodlands is set out and its spread out of an area of around 3 miles. There are 2 areas called Scounslow Green and Gorsty Hill. The area around Marchington Woodlands is Hilly and there are several forests.

=== Climate ===
Climate data for Staffordshire (1971–2000 averages)
Month	Jan	Feb	Mar	Apr	May	Jun	Jul	Aug	Sep	Oct	Nov	Dec	Year
Mean daily maximum °C (°F)	6.5 (43.7)	6.9 (44.4)	9.5 (49.1)	12 (54)	15.7 (60.3)	18.4 (65.1)	21.1 (70.0)	20.8 (69.4)	17.5 (63.5)	13.5 (56.3)	9.5 (49.1)	7.5 (45.5)	13.3 (55.9)
Mean daily minimum °C (°F)	1 (34)	1 (34)	2.5 (36.5)	3.5 (38.3)	6.2 (43.2)	8.9 (48.0)	11.1 (52.0)	10.9 (51.6)	9 (48)	6.4 (43.5)	3.3 (37.9)	1.8 (35.2)	5.5 (41.9)
Average rainfall mm (inches)	62.7 (2.47)	44.4 (1.75)	51.2 (2.02)	48.5 (1.91)	52.7 (2.07)	59.3 (2.33)	46.7 (1.84)	57.7 (2.27)	63.6 (2.50)	60.5 (2.38)	62 (2.4)	66.8 (2.63)	676 (26.6)

== Public services ==
Waste collection services are provided by East Staffordshire Borough Council. Water and sewage services are provided by South Staffordshire Water and the Sewage Treatment Works is in Uttoxeter. The distribution network operator for electricity is Central Networks, better known as E.ON UK.

Marchington Woodlands uses a Stoke-on-Trent (ST) postcode and the Postal Town is Uttoxeter. The nearest library is located in Uttoxeter.

Marchington Woodlands uses two telephone area codes, Burton upon Trent (01283) and Uttoxeter (01889).

The nearest police and fire stations are in Uttoxeter.

== Health ==
The village lies in the South Staffordshire NHS trust area. The village does not have its own doctor's surgery or pharmacy The nearest GP's surgeries can be found in Uttoxeter. The Queens Hospital at Burton-upon-Trent is the area's local hospital. It has an Accident and Emergency Department.

== Crime ==
In 2009 there was an average of 2.9 crimes per 1,000 people for the Bagot and Marchington Neighbourhood area. In 2010 the figure was down to 2.5 crimes per head. The most common type of crime is anti-social or Burglary behaviour. in January 2011 there were no reported crimes in Marchington Woodlands.

== Religion ==
Marchington Woodlands lies in the Anglican parish of Marchington Woodlands and the Roman Catholic parish of St Mary, Uttoxeter. In 2001 89% described themselves as Christian and 11% described themselves as Not-Religious.

=== St. John's church, Marchington Woodlands ===
The only place of Worship in Marchington Woodlands is St. John's church, which is a Church of England parish church.

== Education ==
Marchington Woodlands uses the Uttoxeter Middle school system

There was previously a primary school that closed in the 1981. Now students attend the primary school in Marchington. After students attend Oldfields Hall Middle School and then Thomas Alleyne's High School both of which are in Uttoxeter.

From 1937 to 2021 There was Private Preparatory school called Denstone College Preparatory School at Smallwood Manor which is the feeder school to Denstone College.

== Transport ==
There are no bus routes and all roads serving the village are single track roads.

The nearest bus routes are in Birch Cross. The nearest Railway station is Uttoxeter.

The nearest airports are East Midlands (21 miles) and Birmingham (29 miles).

== Media ==
The local newspapers covering the area are The Uttoxeter Advertiser and The Uttoxeter Post and Times; also on a wider area scale there is The Sentinel from Stoke-On-Trent and Burton Mail from Burton-On-Trent.

Marchington Woodlands receives both BBC West Midlands and ITV Central television. Local radio stations in the area include BBC Radio Derby and Capital East Midlands.
