= Burton upon Trent War Memorial =

War memorial in Burton, Staffordshire, England

Coordinates: 52°48′01.5″N 1°37′51.4″W

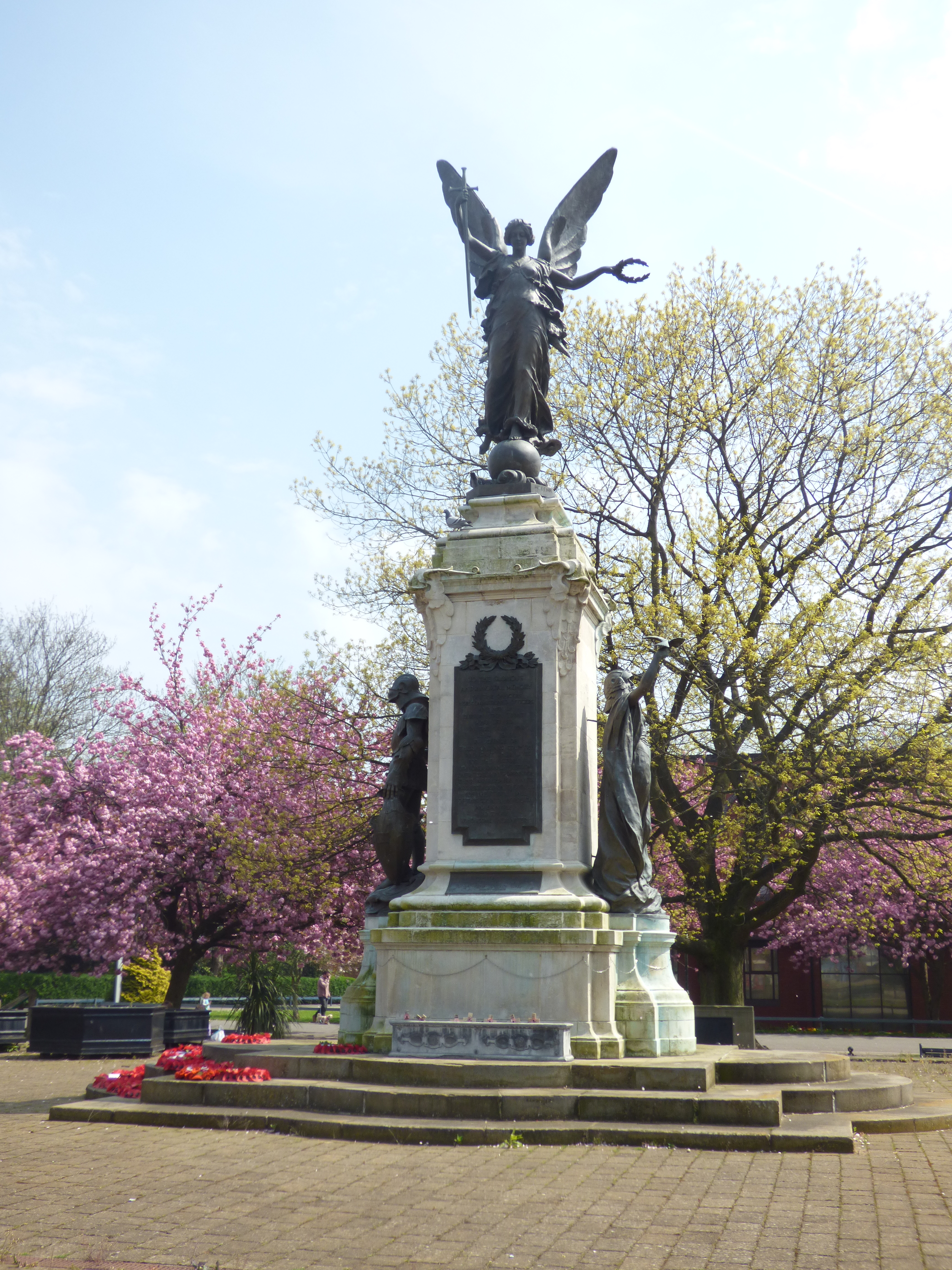
The front of the memorial

Burton upon Trent War Memorial commemorates those from the town of Burton upon Trent, Staffordshire, England, who were killed in the First and Second World Wars. The memorial was commissioned by the county borough of Burton upon Trent from the sculptor Henry Charles Fehr shortly after the end of the First World War. The finished memorial was unveiled by William Legge, 6th Earl of Dartmouth, on 2 August 1922. Its principal figure is a personification of Victory, standing atop a pedestal which is flanked by the smaller figures of Saint George and Peace. The memorial is a grade II* listed building.

== History ==
1922 unveiling

Councillor and mayor of the county borough of Burton upon Trent, George Hill, first suggested that the borough install a war memorial on 9 November 1918, shortly before the Armistice of 11 November 1918 which ended the First World War. The borough established a War Memorial Committee and a public subscription to raise funds. The subscription, which included sizable contributions from the local Bass and Worthington breweries, raised more than £22,000, of which £5,000 was allocated for the design and construction of the memorial and the remainder distributed to returning local war veterans.

The borough's town clerk had previously been town clerk of Hull, where the sculptor Henry Charles Fehr had been commissioned to produce a statue of Queen Victoria, erected in 1903. There was no design competition or invitation to tender, so it is possible that the clerk persuaded the borough to appoint Fehr directly. Fehr exhibited a number of designs at the Royal Academy War Memorials Exhibition in October 1919, which was attended by members of the Burton upon Trent War Memorial Committee. The committee selected one of the designs, featuring a figure of Victory flanked by Saint George and Peace, on 11 February 1920. A suggestion from the public to replace the flanking figures with depictions of a North Staffordshire Regiment soldier and a sailor were rejected by the committee. A contract with Fehr was signed on 25 March 1920 to a value of £4,630.

The memorial was unveiled on 2 August 1922 by William Legge, 6th Earl of Dartmouth, the Lord Lieutenant of Staffordshire. Many local firms gave their employees time off to attend the unveiling. The names of the local dead were not inscribed on the memorial but on panels within the town hall. After the Second World War a small bronze plaque was added to the memorial, extending its dedication to cover that conflict. Ownership of the memorial passed from the borough to East Staffordshire Borough Council when the latter body was established in 1974. On 22 June 1979 the memorial was granted statutory protection as a grade II* listed building. In 2000 the statue of Victory was removed temporarily for conservation, funded by a grant from the War Memorials Trust.

== Description ==
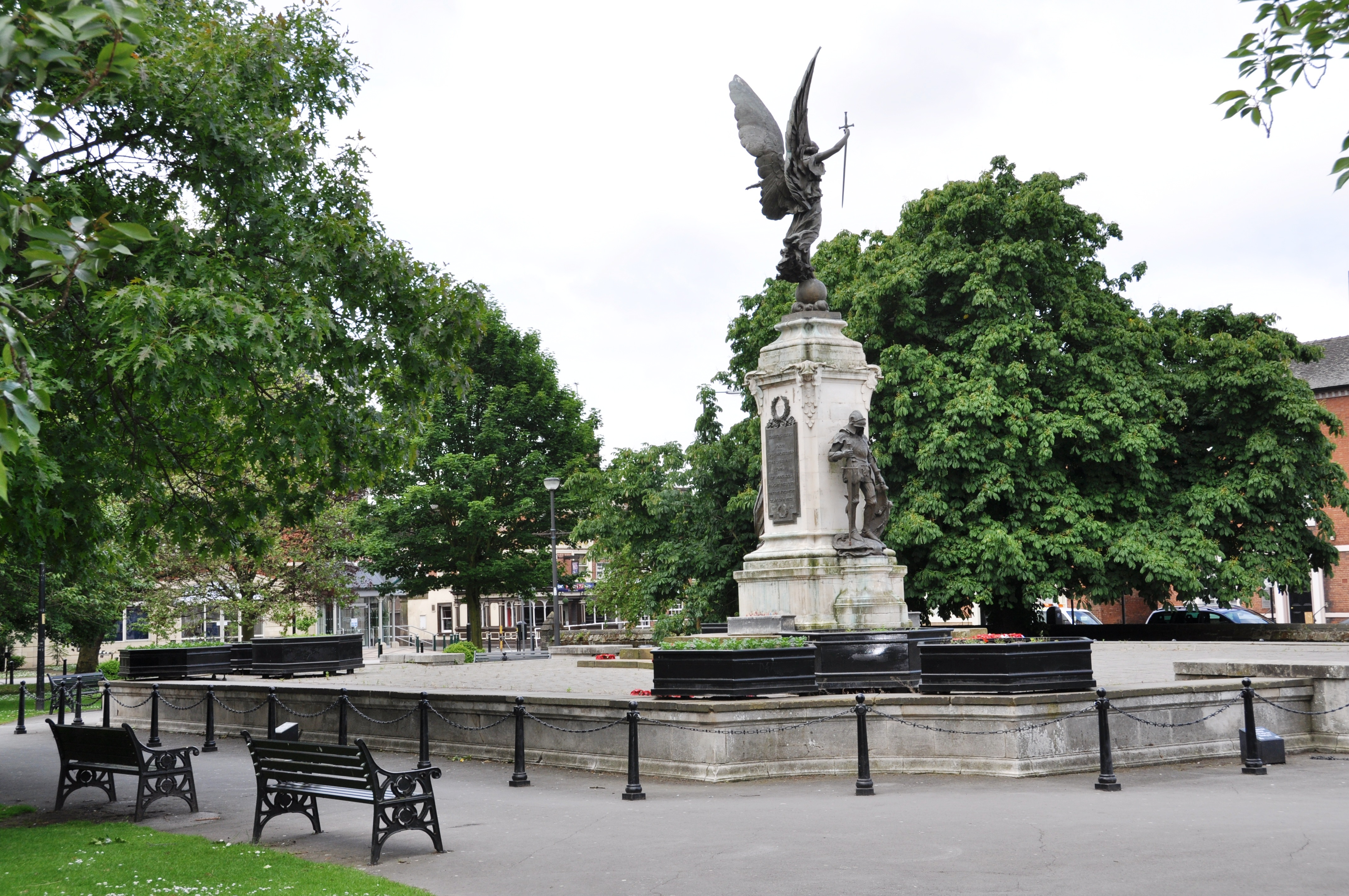
Rear of the memorial and the wider setting

The monument stands in the town's Memorial Gardens, off Lichfield Street, in front of Burton & South Derbyshire College. The principal focus is the winged figure of Victory atop a Portland stone pedestal; the goddess was depicted by Fehr in many of his other war memorials. Cast in bronze, she stands 2.25 metres (7 ft 5 in) tall and is shown stood atop a globe holding a downwards-pointing sword in her right hand and a laurel wreath in her left.

The pedestal measures 5.5 metres (18 ft) in height and 2.4 by 1.8 metres (7 ft 10 in × 5 ft 11 in) in cross section. ts top four corners contain carved representations of cherubs with winged helmets. The front and rear of the pedestal hold bronze plaques dedicating the memorial to the memory of the men who died in the First World War. The sides of the pedestal feature 1.8 metres (5 ft 11 in)–high bronze figures of Saint George and the goddess Peace. The armour-clad Saint George stands with his foot on a vanquished dragon, a sword in his right hand and shield in his left, while Peace holds a bird in her outstretched right hand. Saint George is depicted in a naturalistic manner similar to how he appears in Fehr's memorials in Leeds and Colchester. The memorial stands on a three-stepped stone base on top of a wider stone terrace, surrounded by a low metal chain fence.

== See also ==
- Grade II* listed buildings in East Staffordshire
- Grade II* listed war memorials in England
