= Marchington railway station =

Former railway station in Staffordshire, England

Marchington
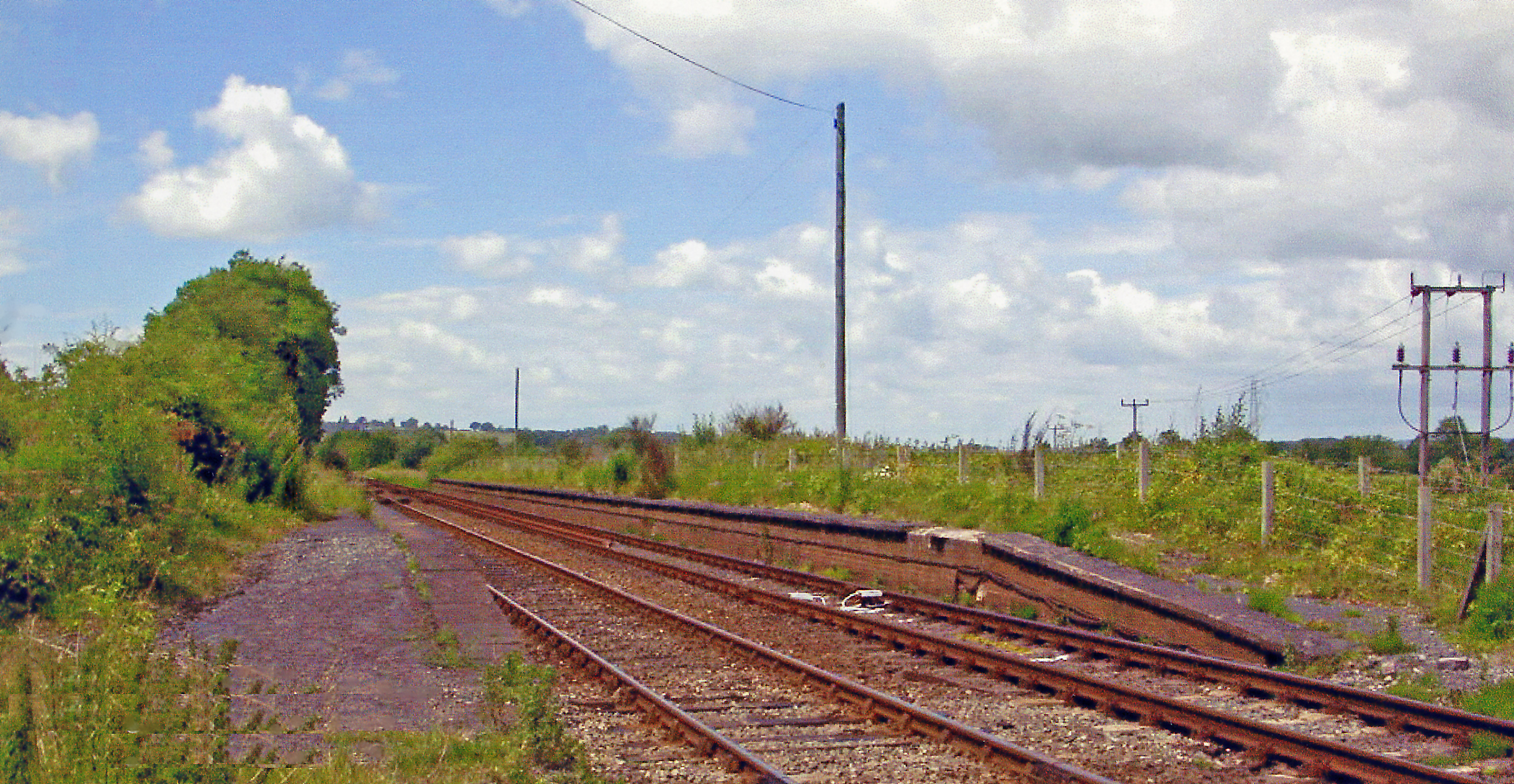
- The station in 2004.

General information
- Location: Marchington, East Staffordshire; England
- Coordinates: 52.8792°N 1.8021°W
- Grid reference: SK134313
- Platforms: 2

Other information
- Status: Disused

History
- Original company: North Staffordshire Railway
- Post-grouping: London, Midland and Scottish Railway

Key dates
- February 1854: Opened
- 15 September 1958: Closed
Location

Marchington railway station was a railway station in Marchington, Staffordshire which opened in 1854 and closed in 1958. It was on the Crewe to Derby Line.

== History ==
The station was opened by the North Staffordshire Railway. The opening date is unsure but the first record of the station in Bradshaw's is in February 1854. From 1862 it was also served by Great Northern Railway services on the route between Stafford and Grantham.

The station was closed by the British Transport Commission in 1958.

The platforms are still in place today, although overgrown, and the station master's cottage is now a private residence. Trains on the Crewe to Derby Line still pass through the station.

Preceding station	Historical railways	Following station
Uttoxeter Line open, station Open	North Staffordshire Railway Crewe to Derby Line	Sudbury Line open, station closed
