= Loxley Hall =

Country house in Staffordshire, England

Coordinates: 52.8864°N 1.9104°W

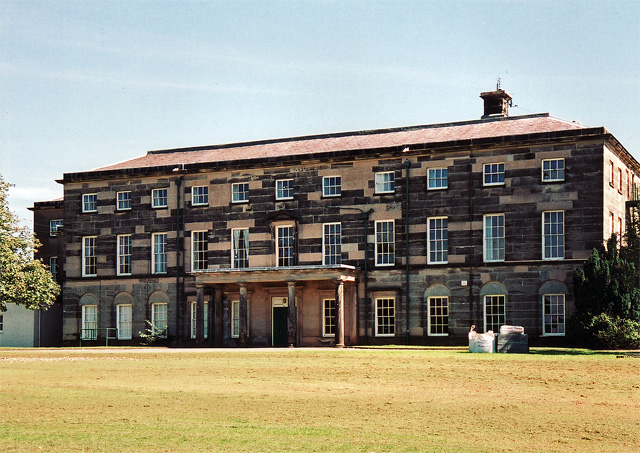

- Location within Staffordshire

General information
- Location: Uttoxeter, Staffordshire, England

Loxley Hall is an early-19th-century country house near Uttoxeter, Staffordshire, now occupied by a Staffordshire County Council special school for boys with challenging behaviour difficulties. It is a Grade II* listed building.

An early manor house on the site was owned by the Ferrers family and from the 14th century following the marriage of the Ferrers heiress, by a branch of the Kynnersley family (Sneyd-Kynnersley from 1815).

In the 18th century a substantial mansion was built on the site, the main entrance front to the south having eleven bays, the central three bays pedimented, and two storeys with dormers. The east wing was of five bays.

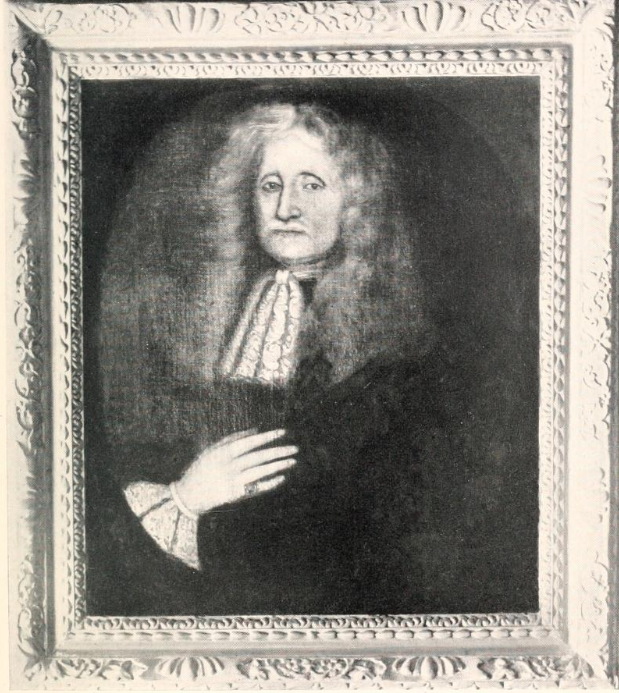
Thomas Kynnersley of Loxley Hall

Mary Kynnersley was born here in the 1700s. Thomas Kynnersley was her father. She married into European aristocracy becoming Baroness de Bode in the nobility of the Holy Roman empire. She lost a fortune in the French revolution and died in 1812 in Moscow.

Alfred Tennyson wrote the Locksley Hall poems after a mansion of the same name in Staffordshire, former country house of Thomas Kynnersley.

In the early 19th century the house was remodelled and enlarged. A third storey under a hipped roof was added and the east wing was extended to seven bays.

== See also ==
- Grade II* listed buildings in East Staffordshire
- Listed buildings in Uttoxeter Rural
