= Leigh railway station (Staffordshire) =

Former railway station in the England

Leigh
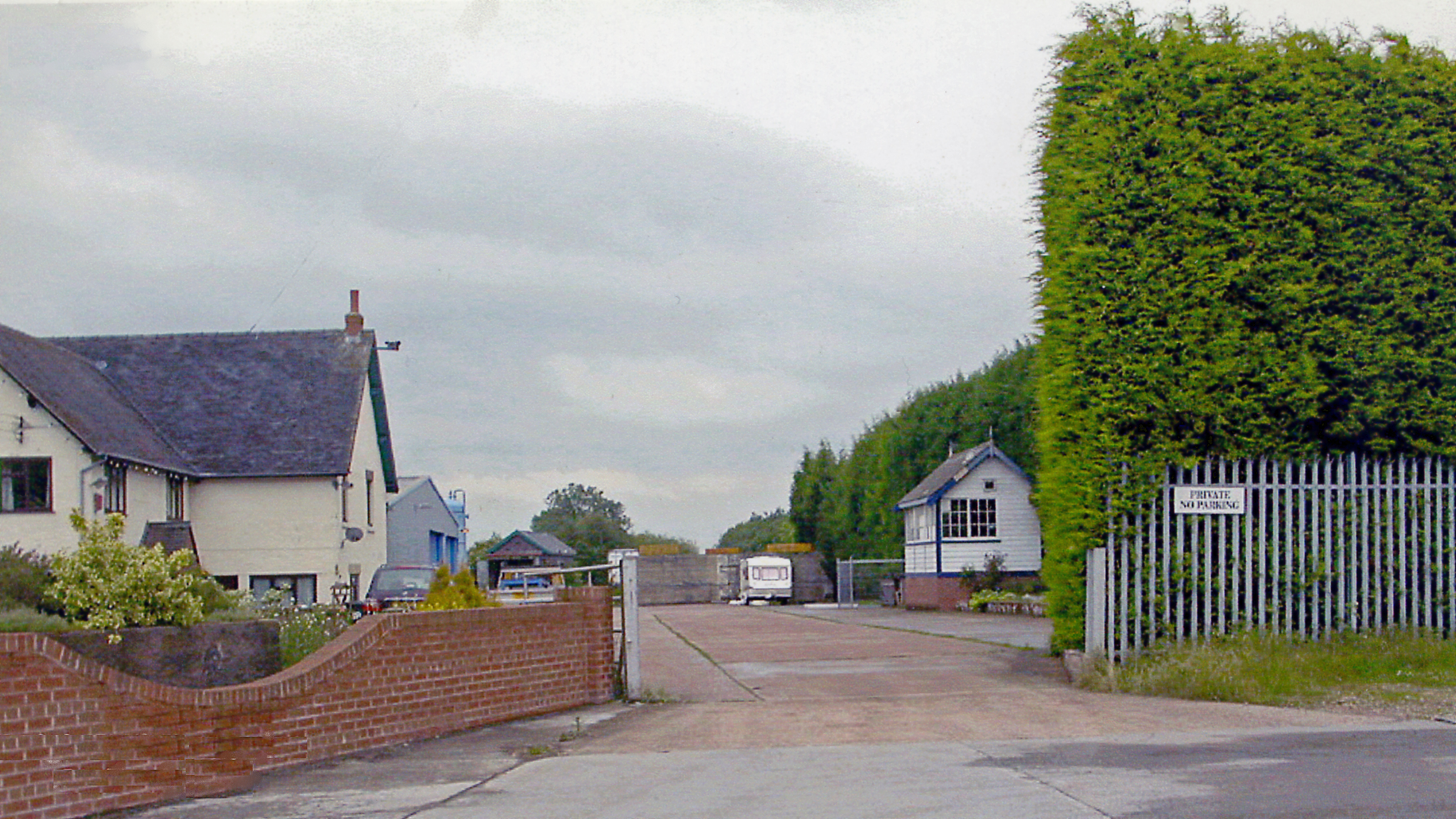

General information
- Location: Church Leigh, Staffordshire; England
- Coordinates: 52.9190°N 1.9794°W
- Grid reference: SK014357
- Platforms: 2

Other information
- Status: Disused

History
- Original company: North Staffordshire Railway
- Post-grouping: London, Midland & Scottish Railway

Key dates
- 7 August 1848: Opened
- 7 December 1964: Closed to goods traffic
- 7 November 1966: Closed to passengers
Location

Leigh railway station was a railway station that served the village of Leigh in the East Staffordshire district of Staffordshire, England.

The railway line between Stoke-on-Trent and Uttoxeter was opened by the North Staffordshire Railway (NSR) in 1848 and a station to serve the village of Church Leigh was opened at the same time.

The station remained open until 1966 but goods facilities had been withdrawn in 1964.

Preceding station	Historical railways	Following station
Cresswell; Line open, station closed	North Staffordshire Railway; Crewe to Derby Line	Bromshall; Line open, station closed
