= Soultz-sous-Forêts =

- Commune
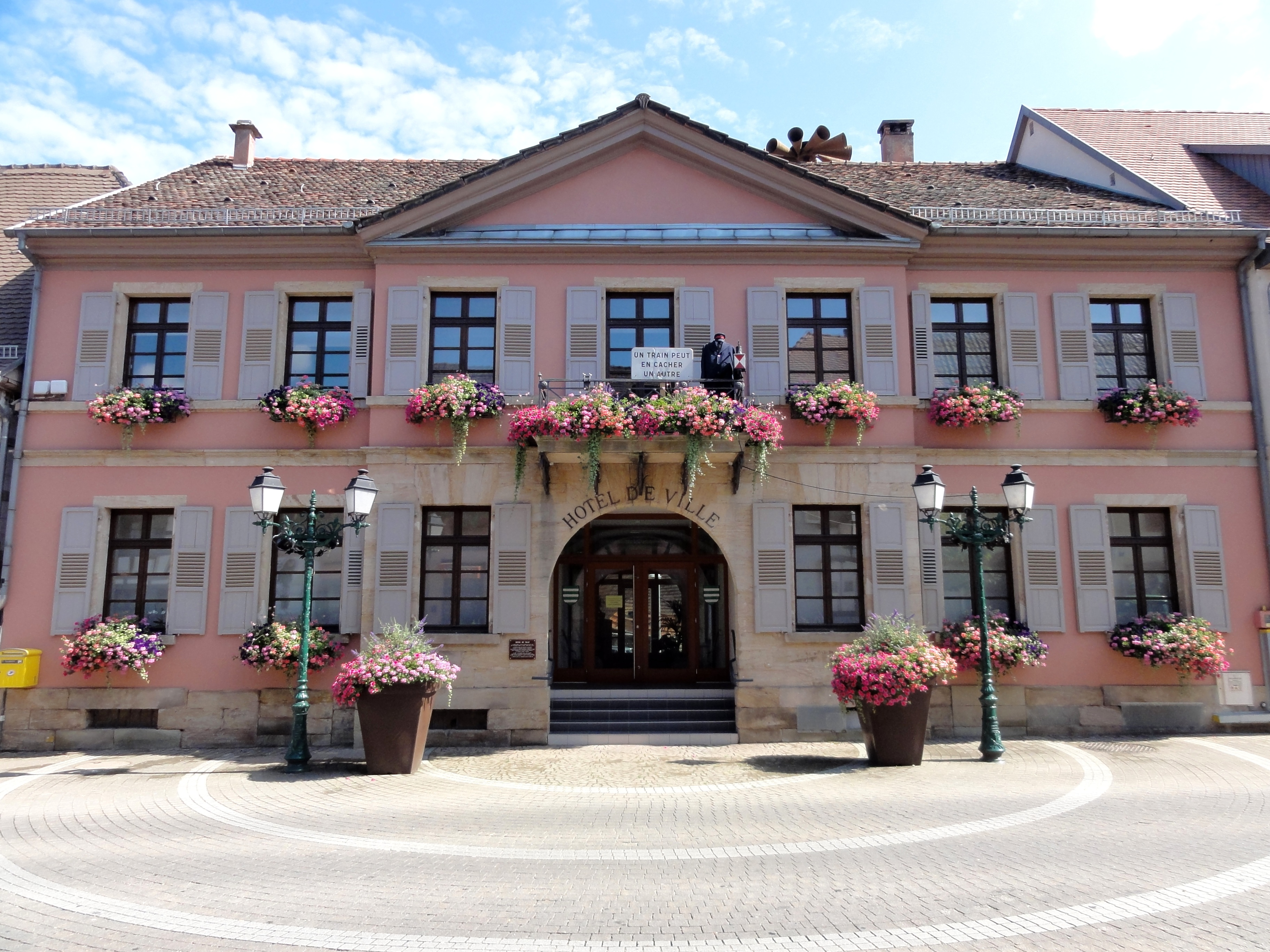
- The town hall in Soultz-sous-Forêts

- Coat of arms
- Location of Soultz-sous-Forêts
- Location within France Location within Grand Est
- Coordinates: 48°56′22″N 7°52′53″E
- Country: France
- Region: Grand Est
- Department: Bas-Rhin
- Arrondissement: Haguenau-Wissembourg
- Canton: Wissembourg

Government
  - Mayor (2020–2026): Christophe Schimpf
- Area^{1}: 15.15 km^{2} (5.85 sq mi)
- Highest elevation: 508 m (1,667 ft)
- Lowest elevation: 137 m (449 ft)
- Population (2023): 3,121
  - Density: 206.0/km^{2} (533.6/sq mi)
- Time zone: UTC+01:00 (CET)
  - Summer (DST): UTC+02:00 (CEST)
- INSEE/Postal code: 67474 /67250
- ^{1} French Land Register data, which excludes lakes, ponds, glaciers > 1 km^{2} (0.386 sq mi or 247 acres) and river estuaries.

Soultz-sous-Forêts (French pronunciation: [sults su fɔʁɛ]; German: Sulz unterm Wald) is a commune in the Bas-Rhin department in Grand Est in north-eastern France.

== The French revolution ==
In December 1788 Mary de Bode who had been born in England and her German born husband Baron de Bode arrived in Soultz-sous-Forêts. The Baron was given the fiefdom of Soultz-sous-Forêts by the Archbishop of Cologne (Maximilian Franz of Austria). Mary described Soultz-sous-Forêts as a land "flowing with corn and oil and wine."

They hoped that the French Revolution would not affect them, but at the end of 1794 the Baron and Baroness de Bode moved out of the town, before they mistakenly returned. They were lucky to make a quick escape over the mountains, but they left all their riches and five of their children behind them.

Clement, one of their sons, and his son tried unsuccessfully, for seventy years, to regain the rights and riches they lost in the 1790s. In June 1854, the case of the de Bode family was debated in the British Houses of Parliament after it was introduced by Montague Chambers, recommending that France should be obliged to award compensation.

== Population ==
Historical population
Year	Pop.	±% p.a.
1968	2,159	—
1975	2,208	+0.32%
1982	2,289	+0.52%
1990	2,185	−0.58%
1999	2,494	+1.48%
2007	2,762	+1.28%
2012	3,011	+1.74%
2017	3,177	+1.08%
2023	3,121	−0.30%
Source: INSEE

== Today ==
Soultz-sous-Forêts is the site of the European Hot Dry Rocks energy research project.

== Notable people ==
- George Abert, member of the Wisconsin State Assembly

== See also ==
- Communes of the Bas-Rhin department
