= Bromshall railway station =

Disused railway station in Staffordshire, England

Bromshall
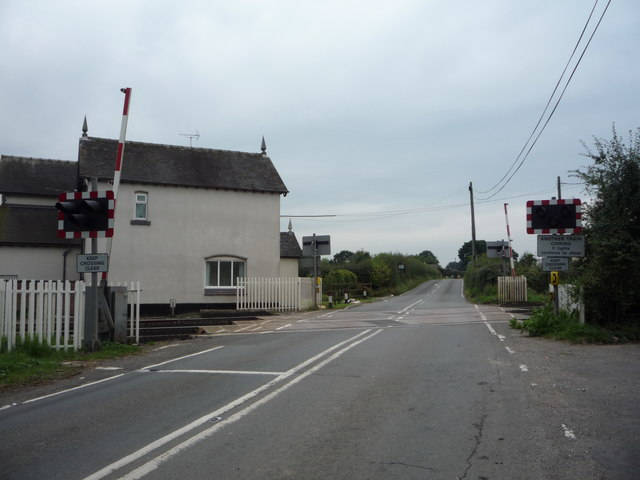
- Level crossing, near the former station

General information
- Location: Bramshall, East Staffordshire, England
- Coordinates: 52.8960°N 1.9204°W
- Grid reference: SK054331

Other information
- Status: Disused

History
- Original company: North Staffordshire Railway

Key dates
- 7 August 1848: Opened
- 31 December 1865: Closed to passengers
Location

Bromshall railway station served the village of Bramshall, in the East Staffordshire district of Staffordshire, England, between 1848 and 1865.

== History ==
The section of the Crewe to Derby Line between Stoke-on-Trent and Uttoxeter was opened by the North Staffordshire Railway (NSR) in 1848 and a station to serve the village of Bramshall (also known as Bromshall) was opened at the same time.

The station was never well used and, after only 17 years, the NSR withdrew the passenger service on the last day of 1865, although the goods facilities were retained.

In 1942, an ordnance storage depot was constructed nearby and new sidings laid to enable munitions produced at Cold Meece ordnance factory to be moved to Bromshall depot by rail. Between May and September 1942, a temporary station called Bromshall Crossing was opened on the site to allow construction workers to travel to and from work.

Preceding station	Historical railways	Following station
Leigh; Line open, station closed	North Staffordshire Railway; Crewe to Derby Line	Uttoxeter; Line open, station open
