= Mary de Bode =

British born baroness who lost her riches in the French Revolution

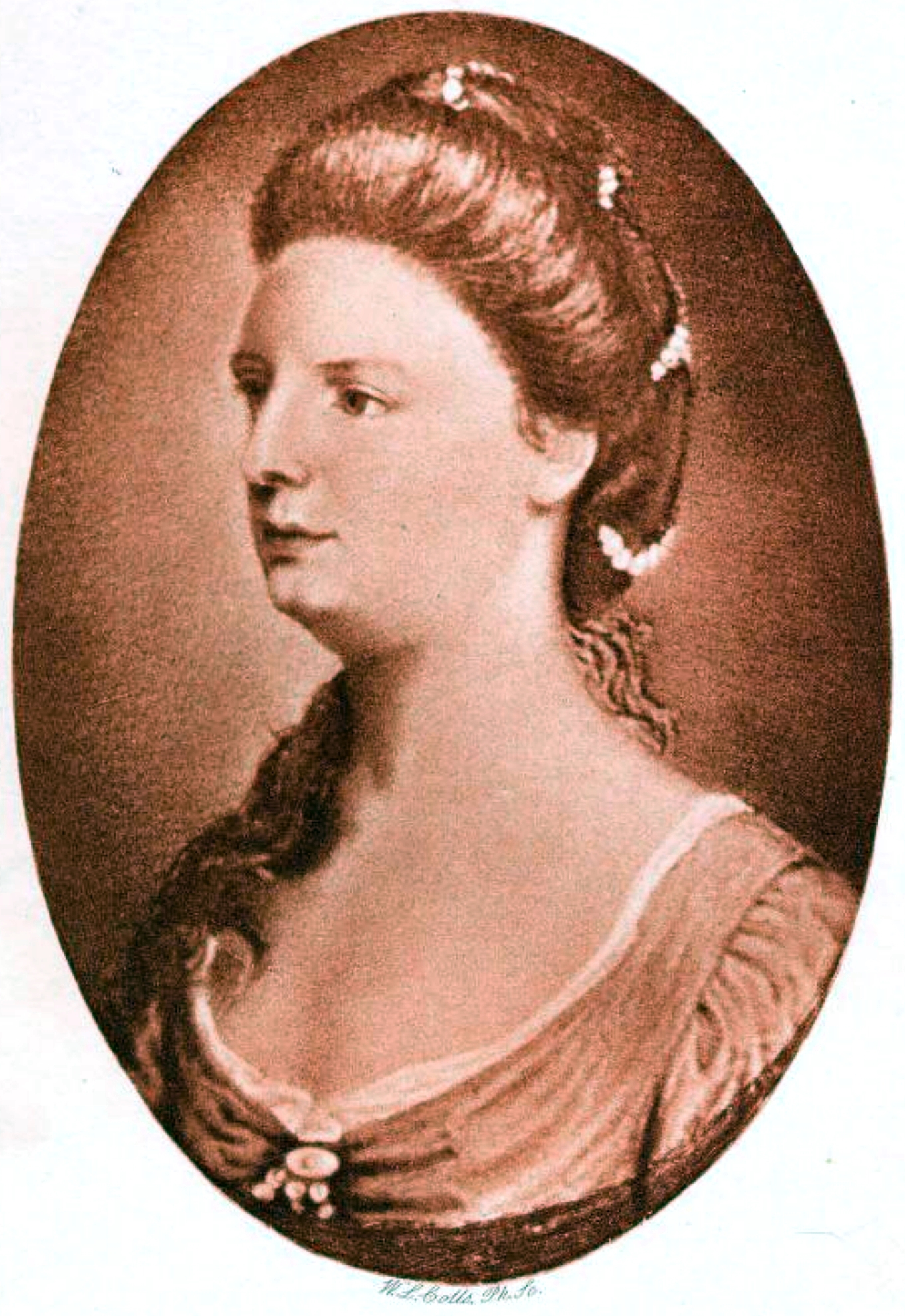

Mary de Bode born Mary Kynnersley was born in Loxley Hall, Staffordshire. She became a baroness by marriage. She became rich when her husband was given estates in north-west France, but her prospects were ruined by the French Revolution. She only escaped with her life and that of her family. Her British roots were the basis of an unsuccessful court case to receive compensation for their lost lands which ran for about 46 years.

== Life ==
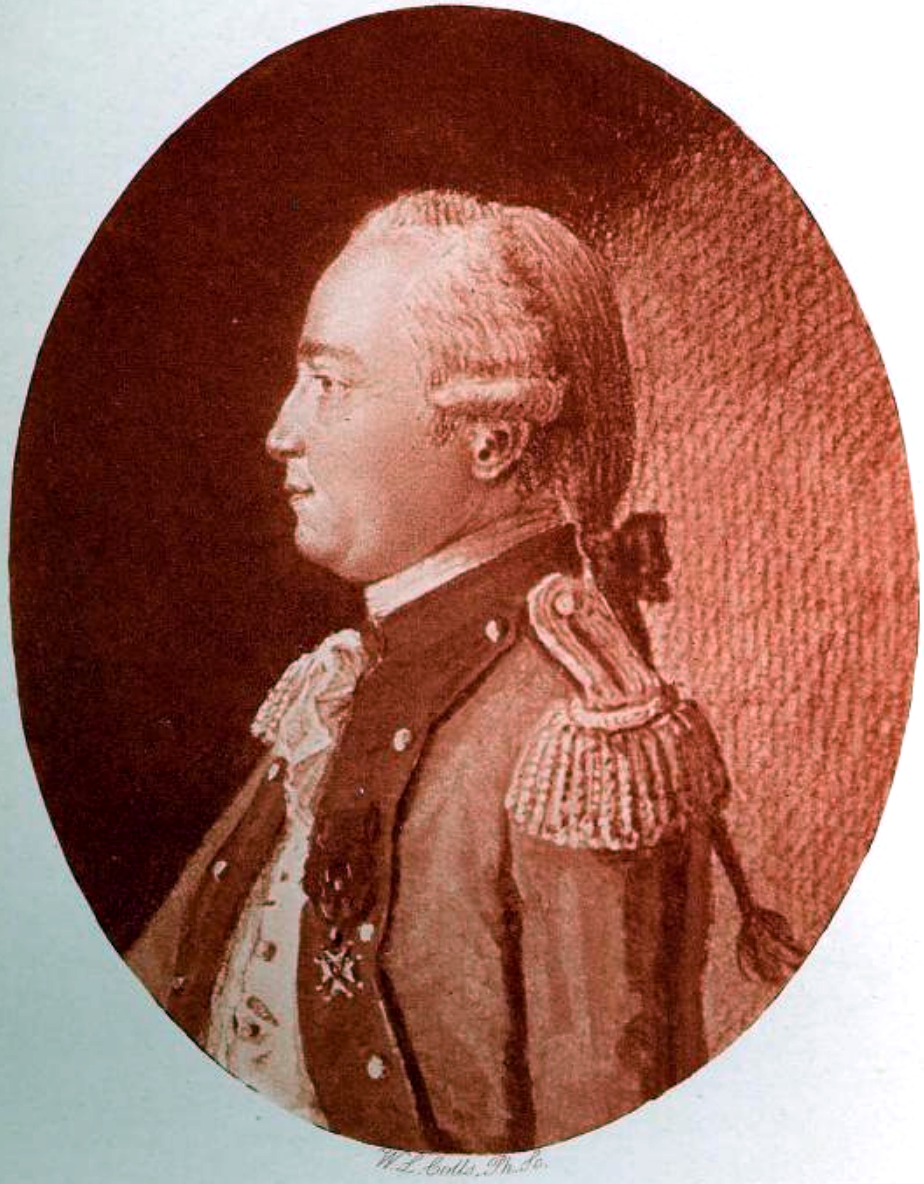
Charles Auguste Louis Frederick de Bode

She was the fourth daughter of Penelope Wheeler and Thomas Kynnersley, the owners of Loxley Hall. Her birth date is unknown but she married in 1775 at St Marylebone Church and at the French Embassy in London. Her husband was Auguste Louis Frederick de Bode, a baron in the nobility of the Holy Roman Empire. He had some notable ancestors but he was not rich. He was born in Germany and worked as a soldier in the Royal Deux-Ponts Regiment in the service of King Louis XVI of France. She had met him while in Flanders. He was a Catholic and she a member of the Church of England.

In 1777 she gave birth to their first child, Clement, in Staffordshire.

They believed that their futures were assured when the Baron was given the fiefdom of Soultz-sous-Forêts by the Archbishop of Cologne (Maximilian Franz of Austria). Soultz-sous-Forêts is a commune in the Alsace in north-eastern France. In December 1788 she and Baron de Bode arrived in Soultz-sous-Forêts. She described Soultz-sous-Forêts as a land "flowing with Corn and oil and wine." The Baroness wrote a large number of letters and she was fluent in French, German, Italian and English.

They hoped that the French Revolution would not affect them but at the end of 1794 the Baron and Baroness de Bode moved out of the town. They lived at different locations in Germany before they mistakenly returned. They were lucky to make a quick escape over the mountains. However they left all their riches and five of their children behind them. They were helped by the Baron's sister who was the abbess of Altenburg Abbey and, following her husband's death, she was eventually reunited with all of her children after transferring to Moscow and securing the patronage of Empress Catherine the Great.

== Death and legacy ==
She died in 1812 in Moscow. Her eldest son Clement, and afterwards his brother Henry, tried but failed for about 46 years to regain the rights and riches the family had lost in the 1790s. In June 1854 the case of the de Bode family was finally debated in the British Houses of Parliament after it was introduced by Montague Chambers recommending that France should be obliged to award compensation. The case was based on international treaties under which France had agreed to pay compensation to British subjects who had incurred losses during their revolution. However, despite the fact that Clement, Baron de Bode and his mother Mary were both born at her family home in Staffordshire, the case proved unsuccessful.

Both Clement and his younger brother Baron Henry, who in 1830 had moved from Russia to London to assist Clement with the case, became impoverished by their efforts, and both spent periods in debtors' prisons. Henry survived financially by becoming an inventor, most notably for inventing a new design for a ship's capstan. He died in 1855 and was buried in Highgate Cemetery.

William S. Childe-Pemberton wrote her biography The Baroness de Bode, 1775-1803 which was published in 1900.
