= Stramshall =

Village in Staffordshire, England

Coordinates: 52.91982°N 1.88089°W

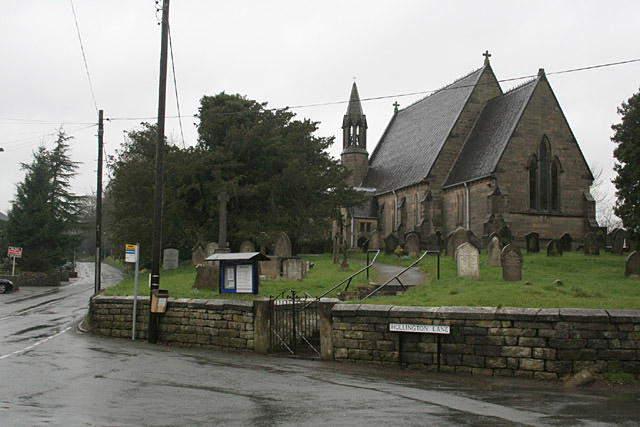
- Saint Michael and All Angels' parish church, Stramshall, Staffordshire.

- Location within Staffordshire
- OS grid reference: SK0735
  - London: 143 mi (230 km)
- Civil parish: Uttoxeter Rural
- District: East Staffordshire
- Shire county: Staffordshire
- Region: West Midlands
- Country: England
- Sovereign state: United Kingdom
- Post town: UTTOXETER
- Postcode district: ST14
- Dialling code: 01889
- Police: Staffordshire
- Fire: Staffordshire
- Ambulance: West Midlands
- UK Parliament: Burton

Stramshall is a village within the civil parish of Uttoxeter Rural, in the East Staffordshire district, in the county of Staffordshire, England.

== History ==
Stramshall has an entry in the Domesday Book of 1086 where it is recorded by the name Stagrigesholle. The manor was owned by the King and the main tenant was Alric who had owned the manor before the Norman Conquest.

The parish church of Saint Michael and All Saints' was built between 1850 and 1852 and was made a separate ecclesiastic parish in 1853.

The village hall in Stramshall was built in 1979 and is located in Vicarage Drive.

The decline of small scale farming in the area was accelerated by the 2001 foot and mouth outbreak and the closure of the cattle market in nearby Uttoxeter. The village has little commerce or industry within its boundary and acts as a dormitory settlement for the surrounding towns.

== Transport ==
The village is served by the 32 and 32X bus from Uttoxeter to Hanley, Stoke-on Trent. The nearest railway station is at Uttoxeter for the Crewe to Derby line and the nearest international airport is East Midlands Airport.

== Parish Council ==
Stramshall falls within the civil parish known as Uttoxeter Rural. The council meets once a month and they hold their meetings in the village halls of both Stramshall and the nearby village of Bramshall which they use alternately each month.

== Stramshall Football Club ==
Stramshall Football Club is an amateur club based in the Staffordshire area. It was founded in 2005 to raise funds to refurbish the local playing field and the team holds a Lads vs. Dads charity football game annually to help with this cause.The team plays in a yellow shirt with black sleeves, black shorts and white socks.

== See also ==
- Listed buildings in Uttoxeter Rural
