= Listed buildings in Uttoxeter Rural =

Uttoxeter Rural is a civil parish in the district of East Staffordshire, Staffordshire, England. It contains 25 buildings that are recorded in the National Heritage List for England. Of these, one is at Grade II*, the middle grade, and the others are at Grade II, the lowest grade. The parish contains the countryside around the market town of Uttoxeter It includes the villages of Bramshall and Stramshall and smaller settlements, and is otherwise rural. Most of the listed buildings are houses and farmhouses, The other listed buildings include churches, a country house and associated structures, watermills and mill houses, bridges, and mileposts.

For the listed buildings in the town of Uttoxeter, see Listed buildings in Uttoxeter.

== Key ==
Grade	Criteria
II*	Particularly important buildings of more than special interest
II	Buildings of national importance and special interest

== Buildings ==
Name and location	Photograph	Date	Notes	Grade
The Oaklands; 52.90186°N 1.91278°W	—	17th century	The house, which was later altered, is timber framed with some rendering, and has a tile roof. There are two storeys and an attic, and a T-shaped plan, with a main range, a gabled wing to the left, and a lower extension with one storey and an attic. The windows are casement window, in the extension are two dormers and a gabled porch, and there is a lean-to conservatory to the right.	II
Woodford Hall Farmhouse; 52.88307°N 1.82769°W	—	Late 17th century	The farmhouse is in red brick with stone dressings, and a tile roof with coped verges and ball finials. There are three storeys and an attic, a double pile plan, two gabled bays, and a service wing to the right with one storey and an attic and two bays. In the centre is a doorway with a segmental head and a fanlight. The windows are casements with hood moulds, and in the service wing are gabled dormers.	II
Caverswall Farmhouse; 52.88148°N 1.93984°W	—	Early to mid 18th century	A red brick farmhouse with eaves bands and a tile roof. There are two storeys and an attic, and three bays. On the front is a gabled porch, and to the left is a blocked doorway with a segmental head. The windows are casements, also with segmental heads.	II
Burndhurst Mill and House; 52.87777°N 1.93573°W		18th century	The watermill and the house to the left are in red brick with stone dressings and have tile roofs with coped verges. The house has two storeys, a projecting gabled wing to the right and a front of four bays. The windows are casements, those in the main part are mullioned. The mill has two storeys and an attic, a projecting two-storey gabled wing to the left, and three bays. The windows are casements, the windows in the upper floor and the doorways have segmental heads. In the west gable end is a cast iron waterwheel.	II
Dovecote, Loxley Hall; 52.88706°N 1.91004°W		18th century	The dovecote in the grounds of the hall is in red brick with a hipped slate roof, and has an octagonal plan. There are three stages, with a band and a moulded eaves cornice. The doorway in the middle stage is approached by external steps incorporating a kennel, the windows are casements, and all the openings have segmental heads.	II
Grange Farmhouse; 52.89671°N 1.90692°W	—	Mid to late 18th century	The farmhouse is in red brick with a dentilled eaves course and a tile roof. There are two storeys and an attic, three bays, and a single-storey gabled extension to the right. The windows are casements with segmental heads.	II
Lower Loxley Farmhouse; 52.88570°N 1.91654°W	—	Mid to late 18th century	A red brick farmhouse with dentilled eaves and a tile roof. There are two storeys and an attic, and a T-shaped plan, with a front of three bays, and a low single-storey extension to the right. The windows are casements with segmental heads.	II
Mill Farmhouse and mill 52.91962°N 1.89754°W	—	1771	The mill and farmhouse are in painted brick with tile roofs. The mill is the older, and has three storeys, one bay, and a single-storey wheelhouse. It contains various openings and a gabled projection with an open floor for hoisting. The house to the right dates from the 19th century, and has dentilled eaves, three storeys and three bays. On the front is a gabled timber porch, the windows are sashes, those in the ground floor with raised keystones.	II
Former coach house and stables, Crakemarsh Hall; 52.92638°N 1.86234°W	—	Late 18th century	The coach house and stables, later converted for residential use, are in red brick on a coped plinth, with dentilled eaves and hipped slate roofs. They have two storeys and casement windows with segmental heads, and form four ranges around a rectangular courtyard. The southeast front has a central carriage arch rising from an impost band, above which is a window and a pediment containing a clock.	II
Loxley Bank Farmhouse; 52.88007°N 1.90184°W	—	Late 18th century	A red brick farmhouse with a dentilled eaves course and a tile roof. There are three storeys and four bays. On the front is a porch with a hipped roof, and the windows are casements, those in the lower two floors with segmental heads.	II
Wallheath Farmhouse; 52.87211°N 1.89524°W	—	Late 18th century	The farmhouse is in red brick with dentilled eaves and a tile roof. There are three storeys, and an L-shaped plan with a front of three bays. In the centre is a porch with a hipped roof, to the right is a lean-to outhouse, and the windows are casements with segmental heads.	II
Far Lower Loxley Farmhouse; 52.88472°N 1.91838°W	—	Late 18th to early 19th century	The farmhouse is in red brick with stone dressings, dentilled eaves, and a tile roof. There are two storeys and three bays. The doorway has a bracketed hood, the windows in the left two bays are mullioned with two lights, and contain casements, and in the right bay they are casements with segmental heads.	II
Bridge near Burndhurst Mill; 52.87739°N 1.93608°W		Early 19th century	The bridge carries the A518 road over the River Blithe. It is in stone, and consists of a single segmental arch. The parapet is plain, it has a band, and ends in octagonal piers.	II
Bridge near Mill Farmhouse; 52.91893°N 1.89659°W	—	Early 19th century	The bridge carries a road over the River Tean. It is in stone, and consists of a single segmental arch. The bridge has a plain parapet and a parapet band, and it ends in rectangular piers.	II
Garden House; 52.88195°N 1.90809°W	—	Early 19th century (probable)	The building is constructed in 18th-century material from the remodelling of Loxley Hall. It is in red brick with ornamental stone dressings, one storey and three bays. There is a pediment broken by heraldic arms, and a central arched doorway that has a keystone with a grotesque head. This is flanked by two round-headed windows with projecting foliated aprons.	II
Loxley Hall; 52.88635°N 1.91027°W		Early 19th century	A country house, later used as a school, it is the remodelling of an earlier house. The building is in ashlar stone and plaster lined as ashlar, with a moulded eaves cornice, a low parapet, and a slate roof. There are three storeys and eleven bays, the middle five bays slightly recessed, and a two-storey one-bay link to a three-storey three-bay service wing with a single-storey six-bay extension. In the centre of the entrance front is a portico with four Tuscan columns and a doorway with a moulded architrave and a bracketed pediment. The windows are sashes, those in the outer bays of the ground floor in round-headed recesses.	II*
North Lodge; 52.92737°N 1.86204°W		Early 19th century	Originally a lodge to Crakemarsh Hall, it is in rendered brick and has a hipped slate roof. There is one storey, an octagonal plan, and a rectangular rear wing to the south. The windows are in round-headed panels, and in the rear wing is a blind window.	II
Springfields; 52.91942°N 1.89608°W	—	Early 19th century	A red brick house with dentilled eaves and a hipped slate roof. There are two storeys and five bays. On the front is a Tuscan porch, and a doorway with a rectangular fanlight and sidelights. The windows are sashes with shaped lintels.	II
St Lawrence's Church, Bramshall; 52.89637°N 1.91040°W		1835	The church is in stone with a slate roof and is in Gothic style. It consists of a nave and a chancel in one cell, and a west tower. The tower has three stages, a west door with a pointed head, and an embattled parapet. The windows are in Perpendicular style with Y-tracery.	II
Beamhurst Bridge; 52.92074°N 1.90806°W	—	Mid 19th century	The bridge carries the A522 road over the River Tean. It is in stone and consists of a single segmental arch. The bridge has a coped parapet with a moulded parapet band, and the abutments slope down to square end piers with pyramidal caps.	II
Milepost near Highfields Farm; 52.87760°N 1.88411°W		19th century	The milepost is on the southeast side of the B5013 road. It is in cast iron with a triangular plan, and a cambered top. On the top is inscribed "UTTOXETER", and on the sides are the distances to Uttoxeter, Abbots Bromley, Handsacre, and Lichfield.	II
St Michael's Church, Stramshall; 52.92010°N 1.88352°W		1850–52	The church is in stone with a tile roof and crested ridge tiles, and is in Early English style. It consists of a nave, a south porch, a chancel with a north vestry, and a southwest bell turret. The turret has three stages and a small stone spire, and the windows in the church are lancets.	II
Milepost at NGR SK04903333; 52.89744°N 1.92868°W		Mid to late 19th century	The milepost is on the north side of the B5027 road. It is in cast iron with a triangular plan, and a cambered top. On the top is inscribed "BRAMSHALL PARISH", and on the sides are the distances to Uttoxeter, Bramshall, Milwich, and Stone.	II
Milepost at NGR SK06363328; 52.89701°N 1.90697°W		Mid to late 19th century	The milepost is on the northwest side of the B5027 road. It is in cast iron with a triangular plan, and a cambered top. On the top is inscribed "BRAMSHALL PARISH", and on the sides are the distances to Uttoxeter, Bramshall, Milwich, and Stone.	II
Milepost at NGR SK06493206; 52.88598°N 1.90501°W		Mid to late 19th century	The milepost is in a lay by off the A518 road. It is in cast iron with a triangular plan, and a cambered top. On the top is inscribed "UTTOXETER", and on the sides are the distances to Uttoxeter, Weston and Stafford.	II
