= St Mary's, Stretton =

Coordinates: 52°50′3″N 1°37′28″W

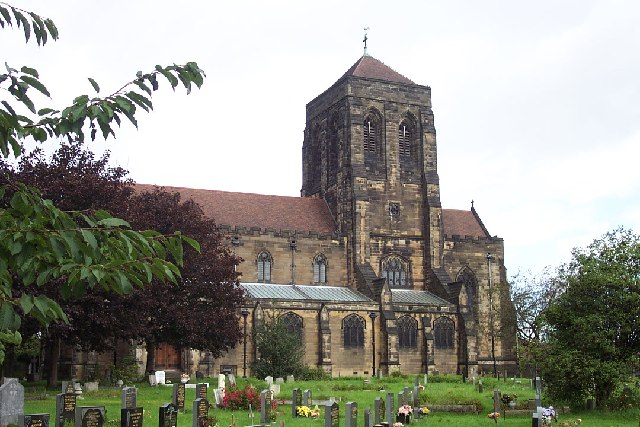
- St Mary's, Stretton
- Denomination: Church of England

Administration
- Province: Province of Canterbury
- Diocese: Diocese of Lichfield

Clergy
- Vicar: Rev Kim Thomas

St Mary's is the Church of England parish church for the village of Stretton, East Staffordshire, north of Burton upon Trent. It is part of the Diocese of Lichfield.

St Mary's church was paid for by John Gretton (1836-99) of Bladon House in Winshill, a native of Stretton and a director of the Burton brewers Bass, Ratcliff, and Gretton. The work was supervised by his son, John Gretton MP. The Victorian church replaced an earlier building in the village.

The church was designed by the eminent architects, Somers Clarke, Surveyor to St Paul's Cathedral and, (when he retired due to ill health), John Thomas Micklethwaite, Surveyor of the Fabric of Westminster Abbey.

(...) on an aisled, cruciform plan with a massive crossing tower. Built externally of Stanton stone and internally of Runcorn stone, it has a short chancel, a four-bayed nave, and north and south aisles, each with a porch at the west end. There is a chapel at the east end of the south aisle and two vestries along the north side of the chancel, one of them used in 1999 as a parish office and the other as a meeting room. The nave arcades and chancel arch are chamfered with moulded capitals on polygonal piers, and the nave and chancel ceilings have painted wooden panels. The church retains most of its original decorations and fittings: wooden rood screen and choir stalls carved in a mixed Arts and Crafts-Perpendicular style by J. E. Knox of Kennington; chancel floor inlaid with black and white marble; stone side-chapel arch carved by Robert Bridgeman of Lichfield; octagonal font of Frosterley Marble with elaborate wooden canopy, also carved by Knox; stained glass by Sir William Richmond in the east window of the chancel and in the south window of the side chapel; and altar fittings by William Morris. Most of the early 20th-century memorial windows in the aisles come from the Whitefriars studio in London. A bell was taken from the 1838 church for use as a call bell, and a further three bells installed in 1897 were recast as six in 1960.

A chronogram in the sanctuary gives the year of the consecration of the church - 1897.
