= Marchington =

Village in Staffordshire, England

Coordinates: 52.875°N 1.803°W

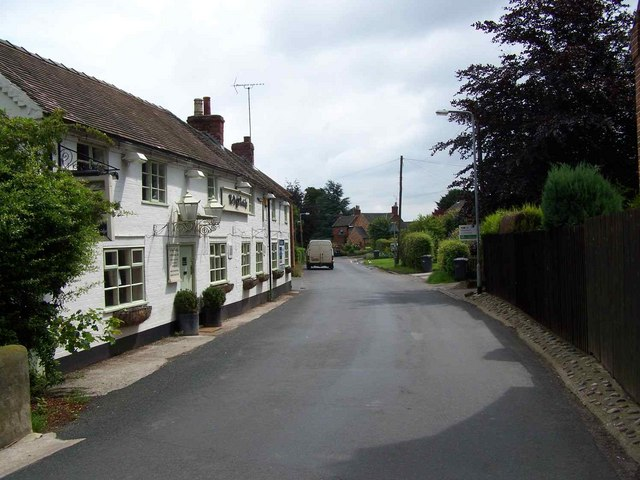
- Church Lane in Marchington

- Location within Staffordshire
- Population: 2,017 (2011)
- OS grid reference: SK132308
- Civil parish: Marchington
- District: East Staffordshire
- Shire county: Staffordshire
- Region: West Midlands
- Country: England
- Sovereign state: United Kingdom
- Post town: UTTOXETER
- Postcode district: ST14
- Dialling code: 01283
- Police: Staffordshire
- Fire: Staffordshire
- Ambulance: West Midlands
- UK Parliament: Burton

Marchington is a small village in East Staffordshire, England. It lies between the towns of Burton upon Trent and Uttoxeter. Marchington has a small community-run shop, a first school, two churches and two pubs. The population of the village was 1,127 at the 2001 census, increasing to 2,017 at the 2011 census.

== History ==
One of the earliest mentions of Marchington is in a manuscript held in the National Archives; A.D. 951. King Eadred to Wulfhelm, miles; grant of land at Marchington, Staffs. Later on Marchington is mentioned in the Domesday Book where it is listed amongst the lands given to Henry de Ferrers by the King. The land consisted of four and a half square leagues of woodland and meadow; 40 acres (160,000 m^{2}) of pasture and work for more than seven ploughs. It was worth one hundred shillings. The lands remained in the ownership of the de Ferrers family as part of the earldom of Derby until the failure of the rebellion of Robert de Ferrers, 6th Earl. After his death in 1279, his widow, Eleanor, failed in a legal case to prove that she had a dower interest in the land. The lands were then held by the king's brother, Edmund, Earl of Lancaster.

A railway station on the Crewe to Derby Line opened in 1848 but closed in 1958.

In 1941 a US army camp was built in Marchington. The vicarage became the headquarters and an officers' mess was built in Silver Lane. It became a prisoner-of-war camp in 1944 when the soldiers left for the D-Day invasion of Europe. The British Army was still using the camp until the 1960s but the land was finally sold in 1980.

=== 1984 air crash ===
Vickers Varsity 'G-BDFT' crashed on Sunday August 19 1984 near Marchington Gliding Club. It severed a 11kV electricity line on landing. 11 out of 14 passengers were killed. The three survivors were taken to Burton District Hospital.

== Demographics ==
According to the 2001 census for the parish of Marchington was 1,127, the parish also includes Marchington Woodlands, The parish had 547 males and 580 females. The area's ward (Crown) was over 97% White British with only 55 people from an ethnic minority.

== Geography ==
=== Geology and topography ===
Marchington is 270 feet (82 m) above sea level. Marchington lies adjacent to the River Dove which also marks the border between Staffordshire and Derbyshire. There is also a small brook in the village, towards the River Dove there is a flood plain. Toot Hill lies to the North West and Hound Hill to the East. The National Forest also lies nearby, to the south of the village.

=== Climate ===
Climate data for Staffordshire (1971–2000 averages)
Month	Jan	Feb	Mar	Apr	May	Jun	Jul	Aug	Sep	Oct	Nov	Dec	Year
Mean daily maximum °C (°F)	6.5 (43.7)	6.9 (44.4)	9.5 (49.1)	12 (54)	15.7 (60.3)	18.4 (65.1)	21.1 (70.0)	20.8 (69.4)	17.5 (63.5)	13.5 (56.3)	9.5 (49.1)	7.5 (45.5)	13.3 (55.9)
Mean daily minimum °C (°F)	1 (34)	1 (34)	2.5 (36.5)	3.5 (38.3)	6.2 (43.2)	8.9 (48.0)	11.1 (52.0)	10.9 (51.6)	9 (48)	6.4 (43.5)	3.3 (37.9)	1.8 (35.2)	5.5 (41.9)
Average rainfall mm (inches)	62.7 (2.47)	44.4 (1.75)	51.2 (2.02)	48.5 (1.91)	52.7 (2.07)	59.3 (2.33)	46.7 (1.84)	57.7 (2.27)	63.6 (2.50)	60.5 (2.38)	62 (2.4)	66.8 (2.63)	676 (26.6)

== Economy ==
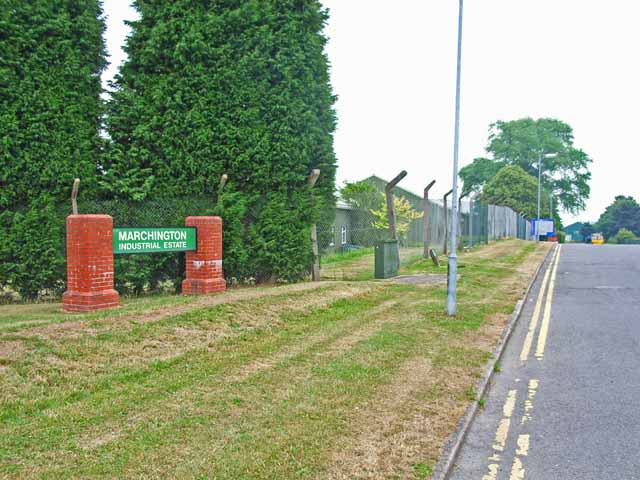
Marchington Industrial Estate

There is a large industrial estate to the south of the village with several businesses. The Industrial Estate previously housed the Home Office fleet of 'Green Goddess' fire tenders.

Today the majority of the residents work in nearby town such as Uttoxeter and Burton-on-Trent. However, some work further afield in Derby, Stoke-on-Trent and Birmingham.

== Governance ==
Marchington is the main settlement in Marchington Civil Parish which also includes Birch Cross and Marchington Woodlands

Marchington is part of the Crown ward in East Staffordshire and is represented by the Conservative Robert Hardwick. The village is in Dove ward under Staffordshire County council and is represented by Bob Fraser, who is also Conservative.

Marchington is part of the Burton constituency and is represented by the Conservative Kate Griffiths. Prior to Brexit in 2020 it was part of the West Midlands constituency in the European Parliament.

== Transport ==
Marchington has 2 bus Stops and is served by route 402.

The railway between Stoke-on-Trent and Derby runs to the north of Marchington but Marchington railway station closed in 1958. The nearest railway station is Uttoxeter.

The nearest airports are East Midlands 20 miles (32.2 km) and Birmingham 29 miles (46.7 km).

== Culture and recreation ==
There is a large playing field to the east of the village.

The village is home to two football clubs, The Bull's Head Marchington FC and Marchington Keep Fat Club (KFC), a veterans team, with an average age in the late forties. Both are based in the Bull's Head, Marchington KFC plays weekly indoor 5-a-side games, as well as outdoor 11-a-side whenever suitable opposition can be found. The team has also enjoyed tours to York, Liverpool and Spain.

Uttoxeter Cricket Club is a family focused club situated in the heart of the village and operates two senior teams that play on Saturday afternoons. They also play some Sunday friendly cricket.They offer competitive cricket at Under 8, Under 11, Under 13 and Under 15 levels. Boys and girls train on Friday evenings throughout the summer and they run the national ECB All Stars and Dynamos Cricket programmes. Coaching is delivered by qualified ECB coaches.

Marchington also has two tennis courts and a crown green bowling green run by the Marchington Tennis and Bowls Club for membership use.

Marchington also has a village hall on the square with an active calendar of shows, events and private bookings. Located in the heart of the village, Marchington Village Hall is available for parties, meetings, concerts, discos, plays, business meetings, with wheelchair access, a full size stage and a newly fitted catering kitchen. The hall has both an alcohol and music licence.

== Crime ==
During June 2011 there were 2 reported crimes in the village 1 being "other crime" and the other being anti-social behaviour, in May 2011 there were 5 reported crimes and in April there were 3. The most common type of crime is anti-social behaviour.

The nearest police station is in Uttoxeter although the Neighbourhood police station is Burton upon Trent, Marchington is part of Needwood Neighbourhood Policing Team which has 7 Police officers and 2 pcsos. The local Police force is Staffordshire Police.

== Health ==
Marchington lies in the South Staffordshire NHS Trust area. The village does not have its own doctor's surgery or pharmacy The nearest GP's surgeries can be found in Sudbury and Uttoxeter. The Queens Hospital at Burton Upon Trent is the area's local hospital. It has an Accident and Emergency Department. Out of hours GP services are also based at Queens Hospital, Burton.

== Public services ==
Waste collection services are provided by East Staffordshire Borough Council. Water services are provided by South Staffordshire Water and sewage services are provided by Severn Trent Water. The distribution network operator for electricity is Central Networks, better known as E.ON UK.

Marchington uses the Stoke-on-Trent (ST) postcode, there was previously a small sub-post office located inside the Village shop that closed in 2009 The nearest one is now in Uttoxeter, the Postal Town is also Uttoxeter. The nearest Library is located in Uttoxeter.

The nearest police and fire stations are in Uttoxeter. Marchington is part of Staffordshire Police, Staffordshire Fire and Rescue Service and West Midlands Ambulance Service.

== Education ==
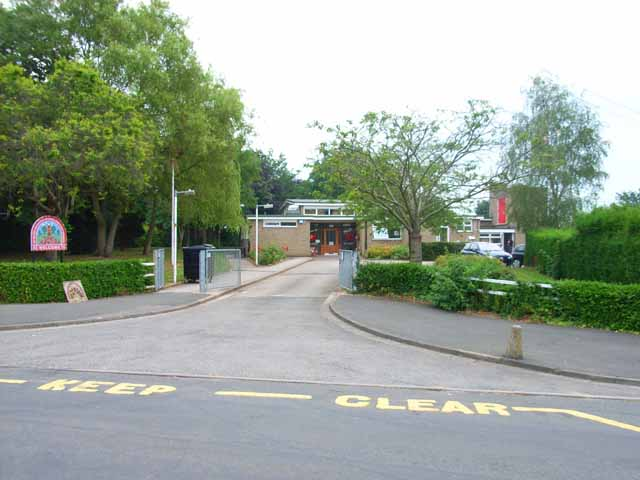
St Peters School

Marchington uses the Uttoxeter Middle School system and years 5–8 attend Oldfields Hall Middle School in Uttoxeter and the areas senior school is Thomas Alleyne's High School which is also in Uttoxeter.

The areas Further education colleges are Burton College and Stafford College.

=== St Peters School ===
Marchington has a small Primary School called St Peters CE Primary School which is used by children up to the age of 8.

The school was originally added in the mid-1830s . The school was damaged by the RAF Fauld explosion of 1944 when 4,000 tons of stored bombs exploded at nearby Fauld. The school was declared unsafe in 1948 and later demolished. The children were taught in an army hut until a new school was built in 1964.

== Religion ==
According to the 2001 census for the Crown ward 85% are Christian and 14% are non-religious with other making up 1%.

=== St Peter's Church ===
St Peter's is the local Parish Church and is a brick building dating from 1742. It is the only church in the parish of Marchington, St Peter. It is also blessed with a two stage tower that is surmounted by a rare octagonal cupola with a leaded roof, a ball finial, and a weathervane.

=== Methodist chapel ===
Marchington previously had a Wesleyan Methodist chapel on Bag Lane that opened in 1840 and closed in 1970. It is now in private ownership.

=== St Thomas A Becket Catholic Church ===
The village's Roman Catholic church on Hall road is a small stone building and is part of the Roman Catholic Archdiocese of Birmingham

== Media ==
The local newspapers covering the area are The Uttoxeter Advertiser and The Uttoxeter Post and Times.

Marchington receives both BBC West Midlands and BBC East Midlands plus ITV Central television. The area's BBC Local radio station is BBC Radio Derby Independent local radio includes Capital Mid-Counties, Hits Radio Staffordshire & Cheshire and Capital Midlands.

== Notable people ==
- John Owen (1827 in Marchington – 1901 in Twickenham) an English vicar and strong amateur chess master. He was vicar of Hooton, Cheshire from 1862 to his retirement in 1900. He played chess in British tournaments into the 1890s and performed strongly in several matches against top British players, who were essentially chess professionals.

== See also ==
- Listed buildings in Marchington
