= St John's Church, Marchington Woodlands =

Coordinates: 52.864262°N 1.838629°W

St. John's Church
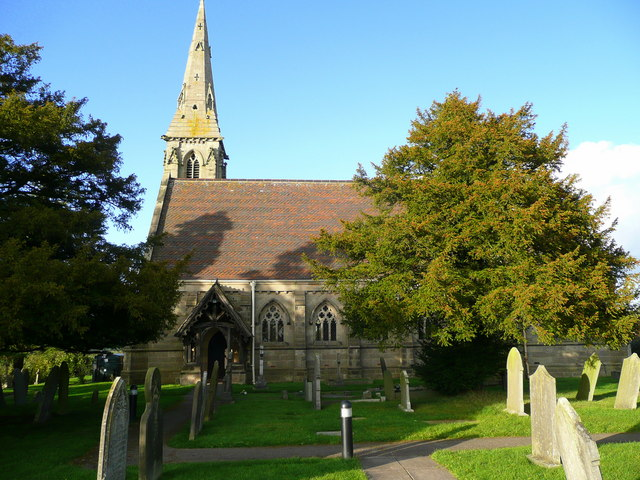
- Exterior of the church
- St. John's Church
- Denomination: Church of England
- Churchmanship: Anglican

Administration
- Province: Province of Canterbury
- Diocese: Diocese of Lichfield

Clergy
- Vicar: Rev. John Jukes

St. John's Church, Marchington Woodlands is a parish church in Marchington Woodlands, Staffordshire, United Kingdom. Built in 1859, this small country church is the only church within the parish of Marchington Woodlands.

== History ==
The church was built in 1859 and was designed by Mark Parsons.

== Churchyard ==
The churchyard contains the war grave of a World War I soldier of the Royal Field Artillery.

== Today ==
The church lies in the Deanery of Uttoxeter and the archdeaconry of Stoke-on-Trent in the Diocese of Lichfield.

== See also ==
- Listed buildings in Marchington
