= Dove Bridge =

Medieval bridge in Staffordshire-Derbyshire, England

Coordinates: 52°54′27″N 1°50′40″W

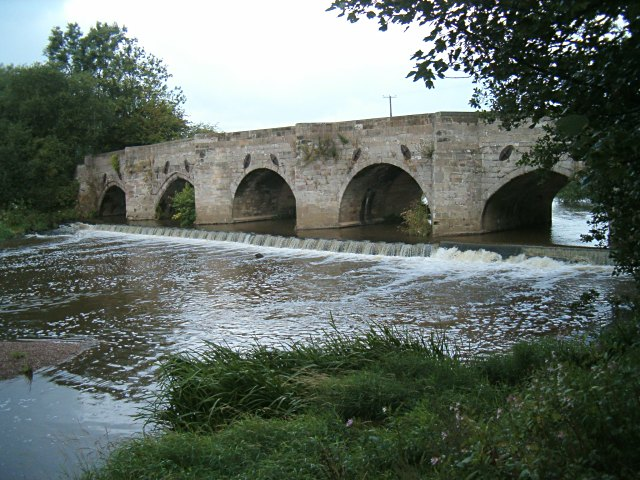
The southern (downstream) elevation of the bridge in 2006

Dove Bridge is a medieval bridge across the River Dove on the boundary of Staffordshire and Derbyshire in England. A river crossing has existed here since before the 1086 Domesday Book, on the road between Derby and Newcastle-under-Lyme. The current structure, a six-arch bridge, is thought to date from the 15th century, though it has been subject to later repairs and significant widening work in 1913. A larger replacement bridge was constructed in the 1970s and now carries the A50 dual carriageway. Dove Bridge is now only used by pedestrian and farm traffic.

== Description ==
The current bridge consists of six arches. The outer four arches are pointed and medieval in origin, the central two arches are rounded and later in style.

The bridge is constructed of sandstone blocks laid in regular courses. It rises slightly towards its centre. One of the older arches is ribbed, typical of Romanesque architecture. The cutwaters, located on both sides of the bridge between each arch, are triangular in cross section and rise to the full height of the deck. They are substantial and allow for large recesses at deck level for use as pedestrian refuges. The bridge spans 63 yards (58 m) and measures approximately 24 feet (7.3 m) between parapets. The parapets are relatively plain.

The bridge is a Grade II* listed building, first listed on 13 September 1967, and a scheduled monument.

== History ==
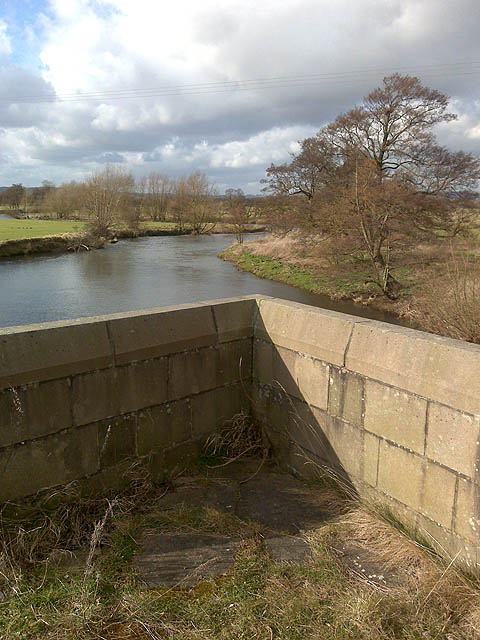
Looking north (upstream) from the bridge deck, showing the top of one of the cutwaters

The site is the location of an ancient crossing of the River Dove, forming the boundary between Staffordshire and Derbyshire. The bridge carried the road between Derby and Newcastle-under-Lyme. The site is recorded in the 1086 Domesday Book as "Dubridge" and by the 13th century was known as "Douebrigg". In the 4th year of the reign of Edward I (c. 1276) a jury presented findings to justices in Eyre that the merchants of Melbourne, Derbyshire, had for three years unjustly withheld the payment of tolls at the bridge, which affected the money available for repairs.

Edwyn Jervoise, an early 20th-century architectural historian, thought that the outer arches might date from the 14th century, though Historic England currently believe them to be 15th century. The central two arches are from a later rebuilding. This has potentially been dated to 1691 based on an engraving in the parapet and records of the Staffordshire Quarter Sessions which allocated £350 (equivalent to £75,366 in 2025) for work on the bridge between 1689 and 1691.

By the 17th century the maintenance of the bridge was partly funded by the income from agricultural land in Staffordshire. This included the 120 acres (49 ha) of Broad Meadow and Netherwood Meadow and 7 acres (2.8 ha) of enclosed land, which was formerly part of Broad Meadow. However revenues from this land were relatively low, at around £7 (equivalent to £1,470 in 2025) a year, as the locals refused to maximise revenue by allowing higher charges for grazing on the aftermath of the harvest. A decree of 24 October 1690 failed to secure a change in this practice. An inquiry of 10 May 1727 led to a decree by the charity commissioners. This led to enclosure of the land from 8 August each year, with all animals excluded and access granted at the end of August for grazing by horses (for a 7 shilling charge) and cows (for a 4 shilling charge). Some 300-400 cattle were grazed each year, greatly increasing income for the repairs. Later the rights to graze the aftermath were sold at auction, raising around £50 (equivalent to £8,814 in 2025) a year.

A hermitage was located at the bridge in the 17th century. Also during the 17th century freemason and alchemist Elias Ashmole participated in a ceremony at the bridge to attempt to invoke spirits. The bridge was visited by Daniel Defoe and the event recorded in his 1724–27 travelogue A Tour thro' the Whole Island of Great Britain. He notes that the locals referred to it as Dowbridge. Defoe reached the bridge on a journey from Derby to Uttoxeter and Ashbourne but his onward travel was prevented by rains that swelled the river and he instead returned to Derby to travel on to High Peak.

In the mid-19th century workmen found a large stag's horn, buried 6–7 feet (1.8–2.1 m) deep in the ground some 30 yards (27 m) downstream of the bridge. By 1858 the quarter sessions of Staffordshire and Derbyshire had agreed to share responsibility for maintenance of the bridge, which was administered by justices of the peace. Significant repairs were carried out in spring 1864 with stones protecting the river bed under the bridge replaced. In 1874 the western-most arch was rebuilt, though the original ribbed design was not replicated. During this period the parapet was also rebuilt a number of times.

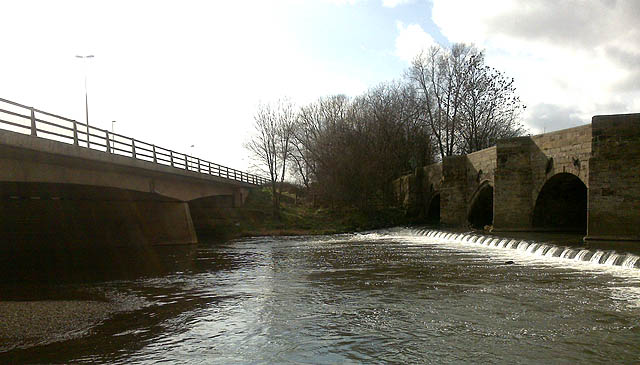
The Dove bridge (right) and its modern replacement

In 1913 a scheme to widen the bridge by 13 feet (4.0 m) on the upstream side was approved with an estimated cost of £4,800 (equivalent to £478,865 in 2025). These works were completed by around 1915. During the Second World War two type 24 pillboxes were constructed near the bridge, intended to defend the crossing in case of German invasion.

The road over the bridge came to be administered by the Department of the Environment, as part of the A50 trunk road. In 1975 the department awarded a £389,966 (equivalent to £3,028,842 in 2025) contract to Lehane, Mackenzie and Shand for the construction of a three-span replacement bridge to the south of the original structure. This was completed by late 1976, a second bridge was installed to the south as part of an upgrade to dual carriageway status completed in 1998. The medieval bridge was retained and now carries pedestrians, cattle and local farm traffic. Until at least the mid-20th century the River Tean joined the Dove upstream of Dove Bridge; it now joins immediately downstream of the new bridge.
