= Uttoxeter Rural =

- Civil Parish
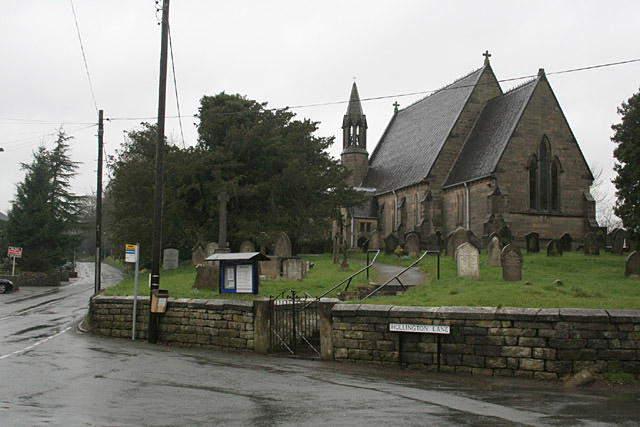
- Stramshall
- Interactive map of Uttoxeter Rural
- Coordinates: 52.904°N 1.906°W
- Sovereign state: United Kingdom
- Constituent country: England
- Region: West Midlands
- Administrative county: Staffordshire
- District: East Staffordshire

Government
  - Type: Civil Parish
  - Member of Parliament: Jacob Collier

Population ((2011))
  - Total: 1,635
- Time zone: UTC+0 (Greenwich Mean Time)
  - Summer (DST): UTC+1 (British Summer Time)
- Postcode: ST14 5
- Area code: 01889

Uttoxeter Rural is a civil parish in the borough of East Staffordshire, Staffordshire, England, comprising the villages of Stramshall and Bramshall. It is separate from the town of Uttoxeter, and surrounds it to the north, west and south.

The population was 1,617 at the 2021 census, a 2.7% increase since 2011.

Until 1974, there was a Uttoxeter Rural District that covered a larger area.

== Representatives ==
In East Staffordshire Borough Council Uttoxeter Rural is covered by the Abbey ward and is represented by Christopher Smith of the Conservative Party.

In Staffordshire County Council Uttoxeter Rural is part of the larger ward of the same name and is represented by Philip Atkins of the Conservative Party.

Uttoxeter Rural is considered a safe Conservative seat.

== Freedom of the Parish ==
The following people and military units have received the Freedom of the Parish of Uttoxeter Rural.

=== Individuals ===
- Thomas "Tom" Ollerenshaw: 6 June 2023.

== See also ==
- Listed buildings in Uttoxeter Rural
