= Leigh, Staffordshire =

Civil parish in Staffordshire, England

Coordinates: 52.919978°N 1.965834°W

Leigh
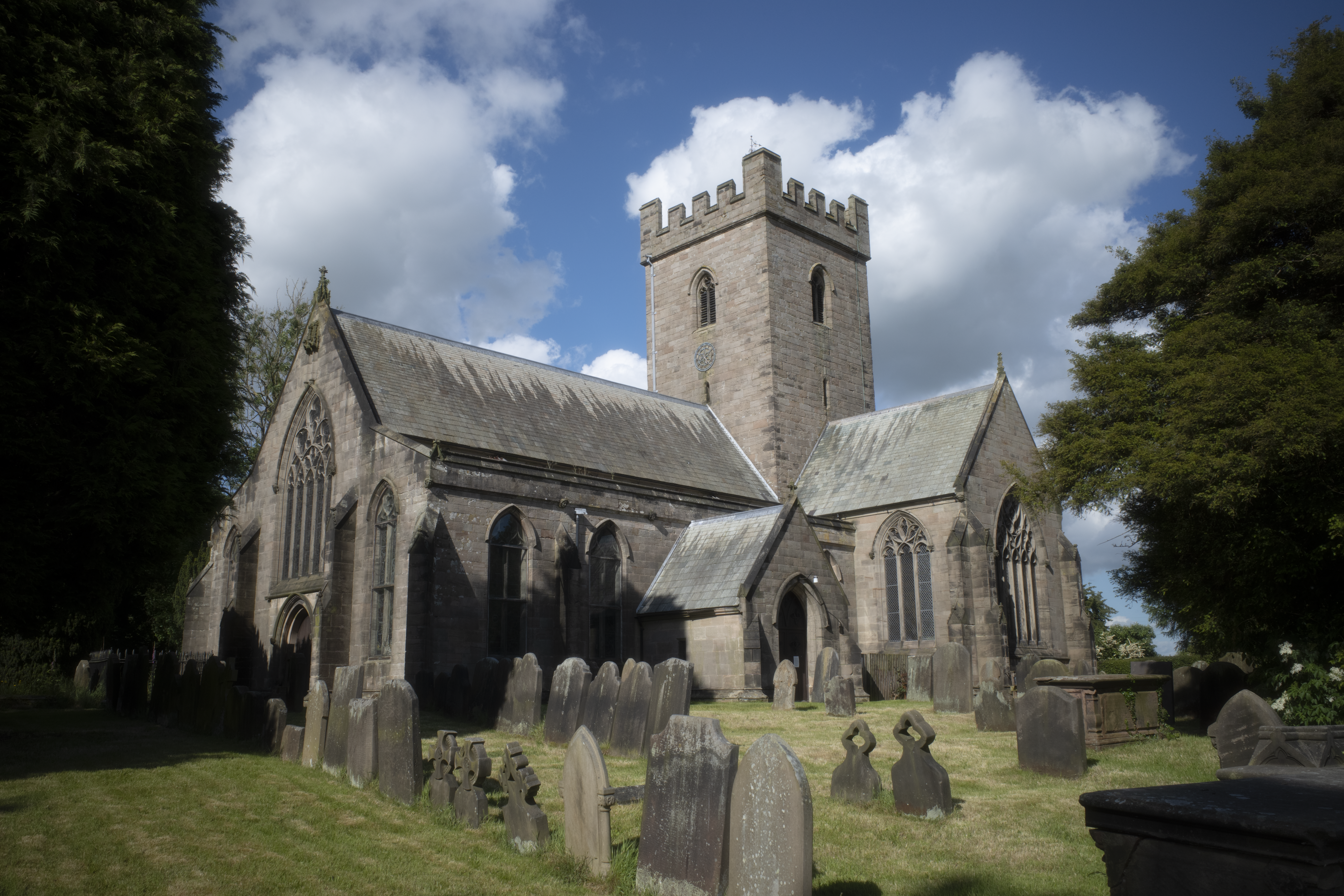
- All Saints Church, Church Leigh

- Location within Staffordshire
- Area: 29.46 km^{2} (11.37 sq mi)
- Population: 1,031
  - Density: 35/km^{2} (91/sq mi)
- OS grid reference: SK020350
  - London: 148 mi (238 km)
- Civil parish: Leigh
- District: East Staffordshire
- Shire county: Staffordshire
- Region: West Midlands
- Country: England
- Sovereign state: United Kingdom
- Post town: STOKE-ON-TRENT
- Postcode district: ST10
- Dialling code: 01889
- Police: Staffordshire
- Fire: Staffordshire
- Ambulance: West Midlands
- UK Parliament: Burton

Leigh is a civil parish in the borough of East Staffordshire in Staffordshire, England. The parish includes the village of Church Leigh, together with the settlements of Withington, Upper Leigh, Lower Leigh, Morrilow Heath, Middleton Green, Dodsley, Godstone, Nobut and Field.

Church Leigh is 6 miles (9.7 km) west of the town of Uttoxeter and 14 miles (23 km) north east of Stafford. The population of Leigh is around 1,031.

== Transport ==
Roads

Church Leigh lies 0.8 miles south of the A50 that runs from Warrington to Leicester and is dualled on this section (between Stoke-on-Trent and the M1 motorway). Leigh has 17 miles (27 km) of roads throughout the parish.

Rail

The nearest railway station is at Uttoxeter for the Crewe to Derby line on the national network.

Leigh railway station was opened by the North Staffordshire Railway in 1848 and was closed in 1966 as part of the Beeching Cuts.

Other

The nearest airport is East Midlands Airport between Derby, Loughborough and Nottingham.

== History ==
Church Leigh has an entry in the Domesday Book of 1086. In the great book Church Leigh is recorded by the name Lege. During the reign of Æthelred the Unready, the Mercian noble Wulfric Spot endowed Burton Abbey with extensive estates in Mercia, including Leigh. The Domesday Book documents the presence of Burton Abbey in Staffordshire as the owners of Legh, with the tenants consisting of one free man and 10 other holdings under villeinage. These holdings employed a total of 5 ploughs.

The monks cultivated the monastic lands in Leigh until 1178, when the ecclesiastical tie ended. At that time, the Abbot sold Leigh Church to Robert Fitz Ulviet for 5 marks, marking Fitz Ulviet as the first non-monastic lord of the manor. In the following years, the lords of the manor included Reginald de Legh in 1268, Philip de Legh in 1341, and Hugh de Legh in 1366. Through the marriage of Sir Thomas Aston to Elizabeth, co-heiress to Reginald de Legh, Leigh manor came under the ownership of the Aston family from Tixall, Staffordshire. The Astons resided in the old mansion, known as Park Hall, situated in Church Leigh. The senior branch held the Scots title Lord Aston of Forfar.

During the reign of King Henry V, a branch of the Bagots of Blithfield grew prominent in the region. Sir Hervey Bagot died in Field, Staffordshire in 1660 and was buried at Blithfield; his title being inherited by his eldest surviving son Edward.

According to the 1848 Tithe Survey of Leigh, there is a plot of land that was previously designated as the parish workhouse. This particular site was located across from the "Star Inn" in Church Leigh, where a residential house is presently situated.

== Notable people ==
- Sir Hervey Bagot, 1st Baronet (1591 - 1660) a high sheriff and Member of Parliament for Staffordshire. He was created 1st Baronet Bagot of Blithfield Hall in the Baronetage of England on 31 May 1627.
- Bagot family, who held land in Staffordshire, including Leigh.
- Sir William Aston (1613 in Leigh - 1671) a barrister, politician, soldier and a justice of the Court of King's Bench (Ireland).
- Ernald Lane (born 1836) an Anglican priest, Rector of Leigh, then a prebendary of Lichfield Cathedral until 1888 when he became Archdeacon of Stoke; also a rower who represented Oxford in the 1858 Boat Race.

== Localities ==
The civil parish of Leigh is centred on the clustered village of Church Leigh but has nine satellite hamlets, with Church Leigh being separated into Upper and Lower. Separating the first two from the others is a field buffer including the River Blithe which flows south, via the Blithfield Reservoir lake 5 miles (8.0 km) south to feed the River Trent at Alrewas, Staffordshire.

=== Withington ===
Withington is a linear settlement on five lanes that is separated to the west from Church Leigh by fields covering 300 m; its oldest farmhouse is a listed building, very well known for its pub.

=== Nobut ===
Nobut is one of the smallest hamlets; with Upper Nobut farm and Withington farm making up the majority of Nobut. Nobut lies 160 m west of Withington, primarily upon Nobut Road.

=== Upper Leigh ===
Upper Leigh is a linear settlement on five or six lanes that is separated to the south-east from Lower Leigh by fields covering 100 m; it has three listed buildings: Moor Farm, Moor House Farm and Manor Farm.

=== Lower Leigh ===
Lower Leigh is on a winding lane, separated from the village Primary School and recreation ground by less than 100 m, to its north-west. The middle of the parish's three bridges along the lanes over the River Blithe is close to the centre of Lower Leigh. Next to this bridge is the aptly-named Brook Farmhouse.

=== Morrilow Heath ===
This is the largest hamlet in area and population, and the most remote. To the south-west, it is on high ground and has a salient boundary as far as the source of the Sprink Brook.

=== Middleton Green ===
Middleton Green is small in population and less than 200 m north-east of Morrilow Heath and is 1 mile (1.6 km) south-west of Lower Leigh. Birchwood Park, an isolated farm, towards the Sprink Brook was historically a manor of sorts and is an architectural listed building, like the others in the parish which are non-ecclesiastical, at Grade II only. Big Wood, rises to the southern border here with extensive views over the rest of the village

=== Dodsley ===
This traditionally agricultural cluster of buildings includes a chapel, and is 0.5 miles (0.80 km) south of Lower Leigh.

=== Godstone ===
Just 300 m south of Dodsley, a traditional manor forms a linear settlement, the traces of which can be made out from the properties, The Orchard, Godstone House and Godstone Cottage, as well as Old Woodcutter, the main four buildings.

=== Field ===
Six farms make up a cluster which forms Field; the Sprink Brook discharges to the River Blythe at a point in the south of the hamlet.

== See also ==
- Listed buildings in Leigh, Staffordshire
