= ST postcode area =

Postcode area within the United Kingdom

Stoke-on-Trent
- Postcode area
- Coordinates: 52.978°N 2.144°W
- Country: United Kingdom
- Postcode area: ST
- Postcode area name: Stoke-on-Trent
- Post towns: 6
- Postcode districts: 21
- Postcode sectors: 90
- Postcodes (live): 17,581
- Postcodes (total): 22,575
- Statistics as at May 2020

The ST postcode area, also known as the Stoke-on-Trent postcode area, is a group of 21 postcode districts in England, within six post towns. These cover much of north and central Staffordshire (including Stoke-on-Trent, Stafford, Leek, Newcastle-under-Lyme, Stone and Uttoxeter), plus very small parts of Cheshire and Derbyshire.

== Coverage ==
The approximate coverage of the postcode districts:

Postcode district	Post town	Coverage	Local authority area(s)
ST1	STOKE-ON-TRENT	Hanley, Cobridge, Sneyd Green, Birches Head, Shelton	Stoke-on-Trent
ST2	STOKE-ON-TRENT	Bentilee, Abbey Hulton, Bucknall	Stoke-on-Trent, Staffordshire Moorlands
ST3	STOKE-ON-TRENT	Longton, Meir, Blurton, Weston Coyney	Stoke-on-Trent, Stafford, Staffordshire Moorlands
ST4	STOKE-ON-TRENT	Stoke, Fenton, Penkhull, Trentham	Stoke-on-Trent, Stafford
ST5	NEWCASTLE	Newcastle-under-Lyme, Keele, Chesterton	Newcastle-under-Lyme, Stafford
ST6	STOKE-ON-TRENT	Tunstall, Burslem, Smallthorne, Brown Edge	Stoke-on-Trent, Staffordshire Moorlands
ST7	STOKE-ON-TRENT	Kidsgrove, Talke, Talke Pits, Alsager, Mow Cop, Audley	Newcastle-under-Lyme, Cheshire East, Stoke-on-Trent, Staffordshire Moorlands
ST8	STOKE-ON-TRENT	Biddulph	Staffordshire Moorlands, Stoke-on-Trent
ST9	STOKE-ON-TRENT	Werrington, Endon	Staffordshire Moorlands, Stoke-on-Trent
ST10	STOKE-ON-TRENT	Cheadle, Church Leigh, Tean, Alton	Staffordshire Moorlands, East Staffordshire
ST11	STOKE-ON-TRENT	Blythe Bridge, Forsbrook, Caverswall	Staffordshire Moorlands, Stafford
ST12	STOKE-ON-TRENT	Barlaston	Stafford, Stoke-on-Trent
ST13	LEEK	Leek	Staffordshire Moorlands
ST14	UTTOXETER	Uttoxeter, Bramshall, Stramshall	East Staffordshire, Derbyshire Dales
ST15	STONE	Stone	Stafford, Staffordshire Moorlands
ST16	STAFFORD	Stafford	Stafford
ST17	STAFFORD	Stafford	Stafford, South Staffordshire
ST18	STAFFORD	Stafford	Stafford, South Staffordshire, East Staffordshire
ST19	STAFFORD	Penkridge, Rodbaston	South Staffordshire
ST20	STAFFORD	Stafford, Woodseaves, Norbury	Stafford
ST21	STAFFORD	Stafford, Eccleshall	Stafford

== Map ==
ST postcode area map, showing postcode districts in red and post towns in grey text, with links to nearby CW, DE, SK, TF, WS and WV postcode areas.

== See also ==
- Postcode Address File
- List of postcode areas in the United Kingdom
