= Bramshall =

Village in Staffordshire, England

Coordinates: 52.8968°N 1.9107°W

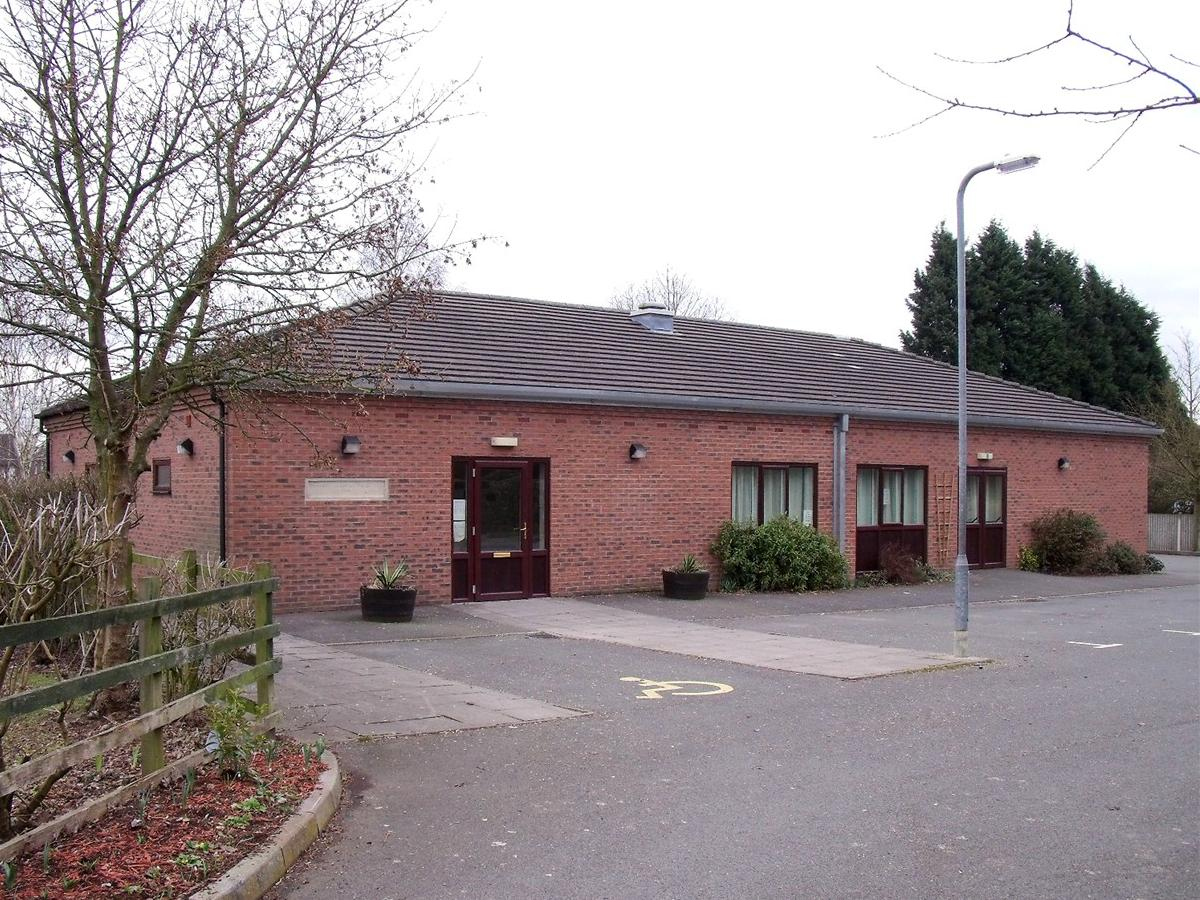
- Bramshall Parish Hall

- Location within Staffordshire
- Civil parish: Uttoxeter Rural
- District: East Staffordshire
- Shire county: Staffordshire
- Region: West Midlands
- Country: England
- Sovereign state: United Kingdom
- Post town: UTTOXETER
- Postcode district: ST14
- Dialling code: 01889
- Police: Staffordshire
- Fire: Staffordshire
- Ambulance: West Midlands
- UK Parliament: Burton

Bramshall is a village and former civil parish, in the East Staffordshire district, Staffordshire, England; it is now in the parish of Uttoxeter Rural. It lies to the west of Uttoxeter, with a new housing estate to the north of it.

== History ==
It was sometimes known as Broomshull or Bromshall; in the Domesday Book, it was referenced as Branselle, with an area to the south called Little Bromshall. It was a possession of the families of Stafford, Bagot and Erdeswyk. The sister and heiress of Robert III de Stafford (d.1193/4), of Stafford Castle was Millicent de Stafford, wife of Harvey I Bagot (d.1214). Whilst her elder son was the ancestor of the Earls of Stafford and the Dukes of Buckingham, her younger son was William Stafford of "Broomshull", ancestor of several other prominent Stafford lines, most notably Stafford of Hooke, Stafford of Southwick and Stafford of Grafton.

Although Bramshall is relatively old, much of it dates from the late 1990s when several new housing estates were built.

There was a military explosives storage area to the West of Bramshall, with 11 sheds approximately 75 feet by 200 feet, served by rail. It was used to store US explosives and was closed before 1971.

== Governance ==
Bramshall forms part of the following levels of governance:

- the Uttoxeter Rural civil parish
- the Abbey ward in East Staffordshire and is represented by the Conservative Colin Whittaker
- Uttoxeter Rural ward in Staffordshire County council and is represented by Philip Atkins, who is also Conservative
- the Burton constituency in the House of Commons.

On 1 April 1934, the parish was abolished and merged with Uttoxeter Rural, part also went to Uttoxeter.

== Public services ==
Water and sewage services are provided by South Staffordshire Water and the Sewage Treatment Works is in Uttoxeter. The distribution network operator for electricity is Western Power Distribution.

The nearest police and fire stations are in Uttoxeter. Bramshall is part of Staffordshire Police, Staffordshire Fire and Rescue Service and West Midlands Ambulance Service.

== Education ==
Bramshall uses the Uttoxeter middle school system. There are no schools or other educational institutions in the village and the nearest schools are all in Uttoxeter.

Primary school students usually attend St Mary's first school, middle school children attend Oldfields Hall Middle School and senior school children attend Thomas Alleyne's High School; all are in Uttoxeter. Also, some attend the Catholic school, St Joseph's, before going on to attend Painsley school in Cheadle.

The local further education colleges in the area are Burton College and Stafford College.

== Transport ==
Bromshall railway station was a stop on the Crewe to Derby Line and was the site of a junction with the Stafford and Uttoxeter Railway that closed to passengers in 1939. The Crewe to Derby line still passes through the village and the nearest station is now at Uttoxeter.

Chaserider bus service 841 operates six days per week, linking the village with Uttoxeter, Hixon, Weston and Stafford. Some journeys also run via Hopton and Salt.

The nearest airport is East Midlands.

== Media ==
The local newspaper covering the area is the Uttoxeter Echo.

Local radio stations include BBC Radio Stoke, Hits Radio Staffordshire & Cheshire and Capital Mid-Counties.

Bramshall is covered by the Central ITV and BBC West Midlands TV regions both broadcast from Sutton Coldfield transmitting station.

== See also ==
- Listed buildings in Uttoxeter Rural
