= Jo Bamford =

British heir and businessman (born 1977)

The Honourable Jo Bamford CBE
- Born: Joseph Cyril Edward Bamford; December 1977 (age 48)
- Education: Ampleforth College; University of Edinburgh
- Years active: 2002–present
- Known for: Wrightbus (owner)
- Board member of: JCB
- Parent(s): Anthony Bamford (father); Carole Bamford (mother)
- Relatives: Joseph Bamford (grandfather)

Joseph Cyril Edward Bamford (born December 1977) is a British businessman. He is the owner of Wrightbus, an electric bus manufacturer based in Ballymena, Northern Ireland.

He founded a green hydrogen investment fund in 2021 and subsequently became involved in a number of hydrogen-focused businesses. Bamford is also a board member of JCB, which was founded by his grandfather.

== Early life ==
Bamford was born in December 1977 to Anthony Bamford and Carole Bamford. His father spent his career working for the family business JCB, the British manufacturer of construction and farming equipment that was founded by his grandfather. His mother is the founder of Daylesford Organic, a farming and lifestyle business.

He was educated at Ampleforth College, then an all-boys Roman Catholic public school (i.e. independent boarding school), following in the footsteps of his father who also attended it. Bamford worked at his parents' businesses when he was home from Ampleforth. In an interview, Bamford stated he would often be "bolting together engines on the 6am shift for one and birthing lambs on the farm for the other." After Ampleforth College, he attended the University of Edinburgh, from which he graduated with an undergraduate Master of Arts (MA Hons) degree.

== Career ==
=== Fund manager and JCB (2002–2016) ===
After graduating from college, Bamford chose to pursue a career in finance in London instead of opting to join JCB. He secured his first financial role in the city at New Star Asset Management. New Star was still in its infancy having only been founded a year earlier and was the brainchild of John Duffield who had previously founded Jupiter Fund Management, later one of London's largest financial institutions. The Bamford family backed Jo's decision to join New Star by becoming early investors in the asset management firm. It was leaked to the press that Bamford had failed his first IMC exam. Bamford finished the year deciding to temporarily leave the UK to work abroad in Shanghai. It was stated that Bamford had become "tired" of the media attention he was receiving in the UK at the time and that played a major part in his decision.

Following his time as a fund manager and spending time in China, Bamford returned to JCB. It was the first time he had worked at the company after spending short periods there as a teenager while studying. His first role was as a product specialist for the skid-steer loader at JCB’s North American headquarters in Savannah, Georgia. Beginning in 2004, Bamford was managing director of the subsidiary, JCB Utility Products. According to Construction News, Bamford "broadened the appeal of the company’s utility product range to new industry sectors" while in the position. This included the launch of the JCB Workmax. In October 2011, Bamford was given an additional role as managing director of JCB Compact Products. The combined turnover of both businesses at the time was in excess of £150 million.

In 2011, Bamford partly funded the purchase of a 500 acre former BAE Systems-owned Woodford Aerodrome. Many different plans were touted for the site, a large section of the site was earmarked for housing, with developer Redrow plc. One former aerodrome building was converted to an aviation museum, Avro Heritage Museum. He and ex-business partner Harry Harvey parted ways after the deal, with Bamford believing Harvey had misrepresented parts of the deal.

In 2012, Bamford took Harvey to court in a dispute about a personal loan when the two purchased property from aerospace company BAE Systems. The two went into business together in 2011. They paired up to purchase the former military airfield 500-acre Woodford BAE Systems property. Harvey and Bamford formed a company together, called Avro Heritage. In 2012, Bamford filed a lawsuit against Harvey and Avro Heritage. The lawsuit was over a dispute about Harvey allegedly misrepresenting parts of the deal to Bamford when Bamford became a personal guarantor to the loan payments. The judge said that he felt both parties had been “driven by tactical maneuvering seeking to impose a cost burden by one upon the other.” The Sunday Times in December 2012 reported that the judge called Bamford’s claim “inappropriate.”

Bamford was promoted in 2014 to head of major contracts at JCB. He remained part of the senior management team at JCB until 2016, a year in which the company celebrated Joseph Bamford's centenary year with a bronze bust at the JCB headquarters.

=== Hydrogen businesses and Wrightbus acquisition (2017–present) ===
After working at JCB for over a decade, Bamford moved his focus to green energy. He formed Ryze in 2017, which aimed to create the UK's first network of hydrogen production plants. To advance hydrogen projects, Bamford started HYCAP, a hydrogen investment fund. He raised more than £200m in its first investment round. He is also the owner of Oxford-based Ryze Hydrogen Ltd, which produces hydrogen to fuel up his hydrogen-powered buses. Bamford said that his family provided half of the initial round of investment into HYCAP. The Irish Times has called him a "hydrogen evangelist"; he is an advocate for the adoption of hydrogen energy in transportation.

Since starting Ryze Hydrogen in 2019, Bamford has lobbied the UK government in favour of hydrogen-technology adoption. After “sustained lobbying” from Bamford, the Secretary of State for Transport announced a programme to convert public transportation in towns into all-electric hydrogen buses. According to Passenger Transport, Grant Shapps was “very, very keen that we push hydrogen” after meeting with Bamford about it.

The Northern Ireland-based bus manufacturer Wrightbus entered administration in September 2019. Directors at Wrightbus blamed low registrations of new buses as the cause, but the Department for the Economy later announced it was opening proceedings to disqualify 14 directors of Wrightbus, due to alleged unfit conduct. Bamford emerged as the preferred bidder for Wrightbus in early October, as he was already familiar with the company. Bamford's hydrogen company Ryze had signed a joint venture the year prior with Wrightbus, after winning a ten-year contract to convert London buses to run on hydrogen. Despite Bamford emerging as an ideal owner for Wrightbus, negotiations between Bamford and the previous owners saw much public wrangling in the press. Most of the disagreement was around the purchase price of the Wright family-owned Wrightbus factory and nearby land.

On 22 October 2019, Bamford announced the purchase of Wrightbus had been completed. Local MPs were both praised and criticised for their involvement in the process. Bamford and the local media suggested MP Ian Paisley played a key part in securing the future of Wrightbus in Northern Ireland. Jeff Wright, the previous owner of Wrightbus, called Paisley's involvement a “vote campaigning exercise.” Paisley wrote an Op-ed in the Belfast Telegraph thanking Bamford for investing in the company and ensuring the bus manufacturer would remain in Ballymena.

In 2021, Bamford sued an ex-business partner Joseph Manheim in the U.S. in a dispute over control of a company that the two started together. The business was designed to help wealthy, foreign investors get residence in the U.S. in 2017 when Bamford “was strapped for cash following disagreements with his father” in 2017. During the case numerous accusations were exchanged by both sides, with claims Manheim misused company funds and counterclaims that Bamford misused his email addresses for illegitimate personal reasons. It ended with the court denying Bamford’s request to take control of the company. The court also noted that Bamford tried to structure the company to minimise his UK tax bill, saying, “Bamford was interested in holding his interest through an entity rather than personally, which he believed would help minimise his taxes in the United Kingdom.” The court case, according to The Guardian, provided the public "an extraordinary insight into a world of extreme wealth and privilege within one of Britain’s most prominent industrial families."

Following Bamford's takeover, journalists began to speculate how many jobs could be saved in Ballymena. The administrator had reduced Wrightbus' employee count in 2019 from 1,200 down to just 56. The Irish News suggested that Wrightbus was already "personnel heavy" so the dramatic cut in employees was required. By the start of 2020, Wrightbus had regrown its employee base back to 400, and by August 2021 up to 900. Wrightbus continued to focus on hydrogen and battery solutions under Bamford's guidance, securing hydrogen bus contracts in Aberdeen and Birmingham in 2020.

Bamford's HydraB and Armstrong Capital Management entered into a joint venture in September 2022 and formed Hygen Energy. The joint venture aim is to build, fund and management hydrogen production facilities in the United Kingdom and Ireland.

The parent company of British Gas, Centrica, announced in late 2022 that it would be entering into a joint venture with Ryze Hydrogen. The two companies would together develop a hydrogen pathway with the aim of "kickstarting the UK hydrogen economy." Ryze Hydrogen, Hygen Energy and Northern Gas Networks then announced the development of a hydrogen production facility in Bradford, West Yorkshire. The facility will use renewable energy to power an electrolyser which will produce clean hydrogen.

In February 2024, Bamford's investment arm Hycap opened offices in Abu Dhabi, UAE, where it would also setup a hydrogen-focus complex in the region.

In June 2025, Bamford was awarded a CBE in the 2025 Birthday Honours.

== Boards of directors ==
Bamford has served on the board of directors of dozens of companies. Currently, he is on the board of directors for Bamelectrics Ltd., Nelelectrics Ltd., JCB Consumer Products Ltd., JCB Ltd., and J.C.B. Service.

He also served as a director at the following firms, but resigned: BHoldings Ltd., J.C. Bamford Excavators Ltd., J.C.B. Earthmovers Ltd., J.C.B. Sales Ltd., JCB Cab Systems Ltd., JCB Compact Products Ltd., JCB Heavy Products Ltd., JCB Landpower Ltd., JCB Materials Handling Ltd., JCB Power Systems Ltd., JCB Transmissions, JCB Power Products Ltd., JCB Finance (Leasing) Ltd., JCB Finance Ltd., Landpower Leasing Ltd., Lucas Love Ltd., RAJ Capital Ltd., Panholdco Ltd., and Panholdco 2 Ltd.

== Personal life ==
Bamford is said to be a fan of motor sport.

Jo Bamford is heir to a multi-billion pound family fortune. His father, Lord Bamford, "is one of the U.K.'s most successful industrialists", chairman of the UK's JCB Company, a manufacturer of excavators, earthmovers and farming equipment, with over 10,000 employees, founded by Joseph Cyril Bamford in 1945. The Bamford family is one of the biggest political financial backers behind former UK Prime Minister Boris Johnson.
