= Ellastone =

Village in Staffordshire, England

Coordinates: 52.98332°N 1.82867°W

- Location within Staffordshire
- Population: 300 (2021)
- OS grid reference: SK116429
- District: East Staffordshire
- Shire county: Staffordshire
- Region: West Midlands
- Country: England
- Sovereign state: United Kingdom
- Post town: Ashbourne
- Postcode district: DE6
- Police: Staffordshire
- Fire: Staffordshire
- Ambulance: West Midlands

Ellastone is a village in the East Staffordshire borough of Staffordshire, in the West Midlands of England. It is on the Staffordshire side of the River Dove and is directly opposite the village of Norbury in Derbyshire. It is between Uttoxeter and Ashbourne.

== Amenities ==
The village lies at the southern end of the Limestone Way trail and has a public house, and church.

== History ==
Ellastone is situated close to the River Dove, on the border between Derbyshire and Staffordshire. The village can be traced back to Anglo-Saxon times in documentation and it features in the Domesday Book, where it is listed as Edelachestone and Elachestone. The Ellastone Parish Register (1907) records the variant spellings, to be found in early medieval manuscripts, as: "Edelachestone, Elachestone, Ethelaxton, Ethelaston, Adlaxton, Athelaxton, Adelachestone, Adalacheston, Edelestone."

The earliest part of the Church of St Peter dates back to the 16th century, with the year 1586 displayed on the tower, but there has been a church on the site since at least 1163.

Ellastone was served by an railway station which was opened by the North Staffordshire Railway on the Ashbourne Line.

During World War II, the bridge over the River Dove was an important crossing point, guarded by two pill-boxes, one on each bank. Both are still visible today, however the box on the western side of the bridge is harder to spot but camouflage paint is still visible above the entrance.

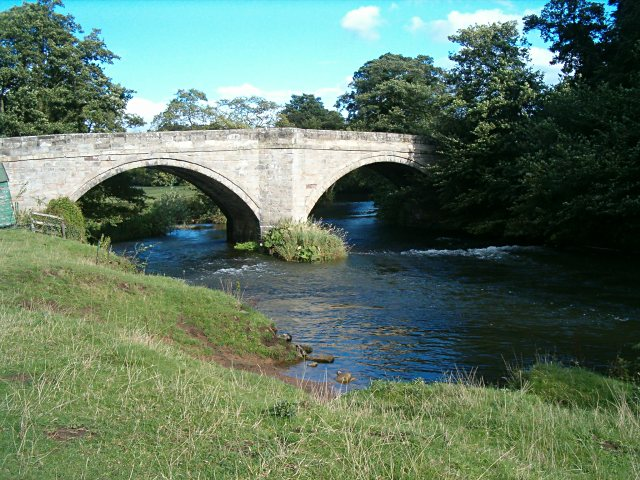
The nearby bridge over the River Dove to Norbury in Derbyshire.

Ellastone Old House, for some time the Bromley Arms Inn, dates from the 18th century and is situated close to the current pub, the Duncombe Arms.

== Ellastone parish ==
The wider parish of Ellastone originally had six townships: Ellastone; Calwich; Prestwood; Ramsor; Stanton and Wootton. Today Ellastone parish remains extensive, and includes the hamlets of Ramshorn, Wootton, and Prestwood. The Weaver Hills, about four miles north-west, lie just outside the parish.

Ellastone is situated in the now obsolete Hundred of Totmonslow. The Hundred had two major divisions and each had its own constable and Petty Sessions. The Petty Sessions for the South division were held at Ellastone

== Literary references ==
Ellastone features as 'Hayslope' in George Eliot's Adam Bede, published in 1859. It earned this recognition because the author's father spent the early part of his life in the village working as a carpenter...

"It was at Ellastone that Robert Evans, George Eliot's father, passed his early years and worked as a carpenter with his brother Samuel; and it was partly from reminiscences of her father's talk and from her uncle Samuel's wife's preaching experiences that the author constructed the very powerful and moving story of Adam Bede."

There is an "Adam Bede Cottage" in the village, so named because it was the family home of the Evanses, the family of "George Eliot" - Mary Ann Evans. Her uncle lived there during her lifetime and it is said that she did visit.

The Methodist references in Adam Bede fit this locality well. Primitive Methodist was born nearby at Mow Cop and the hamlet of Ramshorn (known as Ramsor in Methodist documents) at the western end of the Parish of Ellastone was very significant in the early history of Primitive Methodism. However the reality of the conversion of Hetty (a character in Adam Bede) is suspect in the light of early Primitive Methodist histories.

== Other points of historical interest ==
The ruined Calwich Abbey is also situated nearby. An abbey was first built on the site in 1148, however the latest hall, built in 1848, was demolished in 1935, leaving only the stable block which is visible today. The composer Handel was one of the abbey's guests on several occasions. As such it has been suggested that it may have inspired some of his most important pieces such as "Messiah" and the "Water Music".

Until demolition in 1935 there was a Wootton Hall built by Inigo Jones circa 1730, and formerly visited by the fleeing French political philosopher Rousseau. Arthur Mee notes that this visit was not entirely a happy one. The jibes of the London wits, poking fun at Rousseau's hiding out in the hills, reveal that the place was then known as "Wootton under Weaver", a place were "where God came never" - meaning that it was known as one of the least Christian places in England. Wootton Hall has since been rebuilt at a smaller size as the residence of the Hon. Johnny Greenall of the brewing family.

Also within the parish is Wootton Lodge, a 17th-century house with deer park. This is an imposing property which has served many notable owners, but which is now owned by the Bamford family (JCB).

== Notable people ==
- Walter Davenport Bromley (1787-1862) an English clergyman and art collector
- Anthony Scattergood (1611–1687) an English clergyman and scholar, baptised in Ellastone.
- Gilbert Sheldon (1598 in Stanton – 1677) the Archbishop of Canterbury from 1663 until his death.

== See also ==
- Listed buildings in Ellastone
