= Carole Bamford =

British businesswoman (born 1946)

The Right Honourable The Lady Bamford OBE
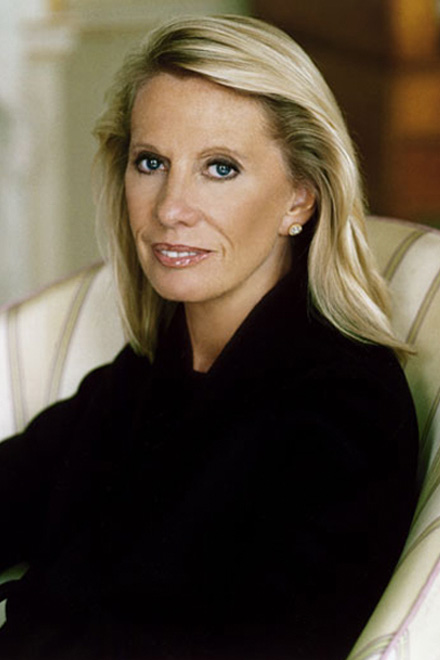
- Bamford in 2014
- Born: Carole Gray Whitt; April 1946 (age 80); Nottingham, England
- Other name: Carole Bamford
- Occupation: Businessperson
- Known for: Daylesford Farm, Bamford
- Spouse: Anthony, Lord Bamford (m. 1974)
- Children: 3, including Jo
- Website: www.carolebamford.com

Carole Gray Bamford, Baroness Bamford (née Whitt; born April 1946), is a British businessperson who founded the Daylesford Organic Farmshops chain and the Bamford brand of women's products.

== Personal life ==
Carole Bamford (née Carole Gray Whitt) was born in Nottingham. She is married to the billionaire industrialist Anthony, Lord Bamford. The family business has made significant donations to the Conservative Party, in particular during the 2010 general election.

She married Bamford in June 1974. They live on a 1500-acre estate near Chipping Norton in the Cotswolds. They have one daughter and two sons. Her son, Jo Bamford, is the heir to JCB and the owner of Wrightbus.

In the 2006 New Year Honours, Bamford was appointed OBE for her services to children and families.

== Business interests ==
=== Bamford brand ===
Bamford founded the first Bamford Haybarn spa at Daylesford Farm in the Cotswolds.

Bamford also supplies onboard amenity kits and skincare products to Cathay Pacific's first and business class cabins, as well as its network of premium lounges.

=== Daylesford ===
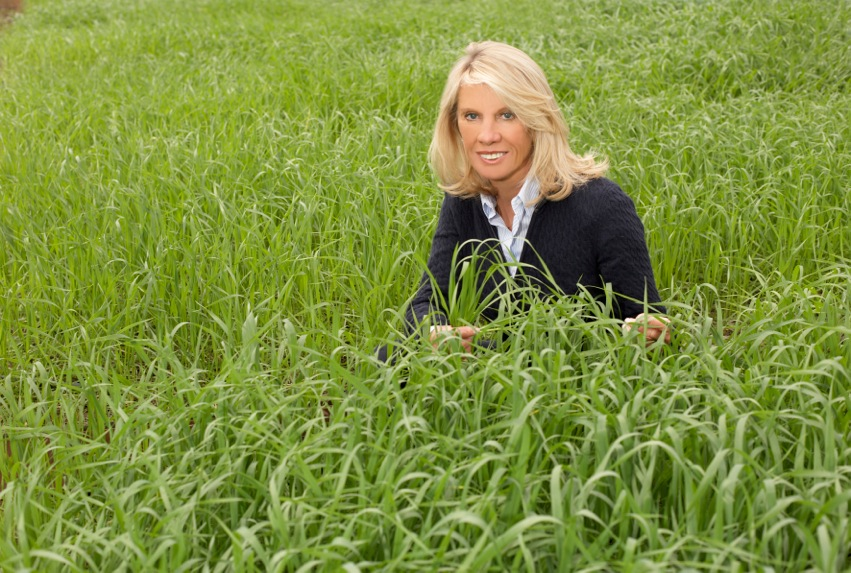
Bamford at Daylesford Farm in 2014

Bamford started converting the family's farms in Staffordshire and Gloucestershire to organic farming. This led to the opening of a farm shop and café in 2002 on the Daylesford House estate in Gloucestershire, and creation of an organic deer farm on the Wootton Lodge estate in Staffordshire.

At a trade event in 2012, Daylesford Farmshop at online retailer Ocado was awarded 'best organic retailer'.
