= Anthony Bamford =

British businessman (born 1945)

The Right Honourable The Lord Bamford DL HonFREng

Member of the House of Lords
- Lord Temporal
- Life peerage 3 October 2013 – 1 March 2024

Personal details
- Born: Anthony Paul Bamford; 23 October 1945 (age 81) Staffordshire, England
- Party: Conservative
- Spouse: Carole Whitt (m. 1974)
- Children: 3, including Jo
- Parent: Joseph Bamford (father)
- Education: Ampleforth College
- Alma mater: University of Grenoble
- Occupation: Businessman

Anthony Paul Bamford, Baron Bamford (born 23 October 1945), is a British billionaire businessman who is the co-chairman of J.C. Bamford Excavators Limited (JCB). He succeeded his father, Joseph Cyril Bamford, as chairman and managing director of the company in 1975, at the age of 30. He was knighted in 1990. Bamford has appeared in the Sunday Times Rich List, and in 2021 his net worth was estimated at US$9.48 billion.

== Early life and education ==
Bamford was born on 23 October 1945 to Joseph Bamford and Marjorie Bamford (née Griffin). He was educated at Ampleforth College, then an all-boys Roman Catholic public school (i.e. independent boarding school). He then studied at the University of Grenoble.

== Business career ==
In 1974, Bamford sued the then MP Jeffrey Archer for bankruptcy after Archer failed to repay a £172,000 loan. Archer had lost the money in a fraudulent share scam. Archer later repaid the money from his earnings as a novelist and Bamford subsequently withdrew the bankruptcy notice.

In 2000, JCB was fined £22 million by the European Commission for antitrust breaches. Bamford said the decision was "disappointing and wrong". A six-year legal battle ensued, which resulted in the European Court of Justice upholding the penalty.

Outside of business, Bamford is a well-known collector of early vintage Ferraris. He was once the owner of a 1954 Mercedes-Benz W196 Grand Prix car raced by the five-time world champion Juan Manuel Fangio of Argentina, and in August 2006, he expressed an interest in purchasing Jaguar Cars but backed out when he was told the sale would also involve Land Rover, which he did not wish to buy.

A few months before Bamford joined the House of Lords, he shut down a company he had owned that was registered in the British Virgin Islands. The company was called Casper Ltd. and was formed in 1994. Bamford was the sole shareholder. A spokesman for Bamford told The Guardian in 2016 that Casper Ltd. never owned any assets, had a bank account or engaged in any activity during its entire existence.

In 2014 Bamford was elected an Honorary Fellow of the Royal Academy of Engineering.

== Politics ==
Bamford is a major donor to the UK Conservative Party and to Reform UK. JCB and related Bamford entities giving Tory party £8.1m in cash or kind between 2007 and 2017.

He donated £1 million before the 2010 General Election, and Prime Minister David Cameron recommended him for a peerage that same year, however Bamford withdrew his name from consideration days before the members were announced. Between 2001 and 2010, JCB Research, a reportedly "obscure" and little known company that was incorporated by Bamford in 1961, donated over £4.5 million to Conservative politicians, although it was only reportedly worth £27,000 at the end of 2010.

In 2012, Bamford was later outspoken on the need for the UK Government to champion manufacturing in the UK and commissioned a report in 2012 on the subject which was sent directly to David Cameron.

In June 2016, Bamford wrote a letter in support of voting to leave the European Union to his employees. In October 2016, he led his company to leave the CBI over the organisation's anti-Brexit stance. JCB also donated £100,000 to Vote Leave, the official pro-Brexit group. In May 2021, Bamford rejected an invitation to rejoin the CBI, after previously having called it a "waste of time" that "didn't represent my business or private companies".

During the 2019 general election campaign, Bamford donated £3,935,984 to the Conservative Party.

In 2023 New Statesman named Bamford the 33rd most powerful right-wing political figure in the UK, writing that he "collects [both] cars and politicians".

In 2025, Bamford donated £200,000 each to both the Conservatives and Reform UK.

=== House of Lords ===
In August 2013, it was announced that Bamford was to be elevated to the House of Lords. On 3 October 2013, he was made Baron Bamford of Daylesford in the County of Gloucestershire and of Wootton in the County of Staffordshire. On 10 June 2014, he made his maiden speech in the Lords during a debate on the Queen's Speech. He spoke a further four times: once on manufacturing, once on Brexit, and twice on green hydrogen.

Lord Bamford retired from the House of Lords in March 2024.

== Personal life ==
Bamford owns mansions in several countries; in England, they include Daylesford House and Wootton Lodge. In 2004 Bamford bought Sloane House in Chelsea, London from oil trader Ely Calil for £45 million. Although he was linked to offshore tax havens in the Panama Papers through sole ownership of Casper Ltd., his spokesman said the company was inactive for its entire existence before being dissolved in 2012.

Bamford is married to Carole Whitt and they have 3 children, Joseph "Jo" Cyril Edward, George, and Alice. Jo Bamford is also a businessman who founded a green hydrogen investment fund after working at the family company. In 2019 Jo purchased Northern Irish company Wrightbus, which manufactures buses, including London's double-deckers.

Bamford is close to King Charles III as well as former prime ministers Tony Blair, David Cameron and Boris Johnson. He provided Daylesford House for Johnson's wedding party in July 2022, along with £23,853 towards costs.

With his wife, Bamford was invited to ride in the King's procession at Royal Ascot 2023.

== Tax investigation ==
In 2023, HM Revenue and Customs (HMRC) launched a probe into "alleged aggressive tax avoidance measures" by Bamford and his brother Mark. The inquiry concerns shares held offshore in Bermudan family trusts.

== Ghislaine Maxwell connection ==
In February 2025, US Attorney General Pam Bondi released files relating to convicted British sex trafficker Ghislaine Maxwell. Bamford and his wife were listed on the fourth page of Maxwell's contact book.

== Car collection ==
Bamford is a prolific car collector with an interest in rare vintage Ferraris. His car collection includes:

- Ferrari 250 GTO s/n 3767
- Ferrari 250 GTO s/n 4399
- Ferrari 250 Testa Rossa
- Ferrari F12tdf
- Aston Martin DBR2
- Aston Martin DB4 GT
- Porsche 911 992 GT2 RS
- Porsche 718 Cayman GT4 RS
- 1901 Darracq and Company London

== Arms ==
Coat of arms of Anthony Bamford
Escutcheon Gules a sword erect Proper pommel and hilt Or surrounded by a fess wavy Erminois in chief two cross crosslets fitchy Or. Supporters On either side a Dark Bay Horse with black point colouration Proper unguled Argent that to the dexter resting the interior hind hoof on a Stafford knot and that to the sinister resting the interior hind hoof on a horseshoe both Or. Motto Dum Rectus Securus

Business positions
Preceded by Joseph Bamford	Chairman of JCB; 1975–present	Incumbent
Orders of precedence in the United Kingdom
Preceded by The Lord Palumbo of Southwark	Gentlemen; Baron Bamford	Followed by The Lord Thomas of Cwmgiedd
