= Listed buildings in Ramshorn =

Ramshorn is a civil parish in the district of East Staffordshire, Staffordshire, England. It contains seven listed buildings that are recorded in the National Heritage List for England. Of these, one is listed at Grade I, the highest of the three grades, two are at Grade II*, the middle grade, and the others are at Grade II, the lowest grade. The most important building in the parish is Wootton Lodge, a country house, which is listed together with associated structures. The parish is otherwise mainly rural, and the other listed buildings are a farmhouse, and an associated coach house and stable.

== Key ==
Grade	Criteria
I	Buildings of exceptional interest, sometimes considered to be internationally important
II*	Particularly important buildings of more than special interest
II	Buildings of national importance and special interest

== Buildings ==
Name and location	Photograph	Date	Notes	Grade
Wootton Lodge; 52.99150°N 1.85889°W		c. 1600	A country house in stone with a moulded eaves cornice, a balustraded parapet, and a lead-covered roof. There are three storeys and a basement, and a front of five wide bays. The central bay projects, and balustraded steps lead up to a porch with coupled fluted Ionic columns surmounted by coupled obelisks and an entablature. The outer bays have full-height canted bay windows. On the sides are full-height bow windows. The basement windows are mullioned and elsewhere they are mullioned and transomed with moulded surrounds.	I
Unwin Farmhouse; 53.00549°N 1.87541°W	—	17th century	The farmhouse, which has been altered and extended, is in stone with quoins, and has a tile roof with coped verges and kneelers. There are two storeys, three bays, and a single-storey single-bay extension to the left. The windows are casements, those in the ground floor with hood moulds.	II
Gate piers and walls east of Wootton Lodge; 52.99140°N 1.85748°W	—	17th century	The gate piers and walls are in stone. The walls enclose the courtyard to the east of the house on the north, south and east sides. The north and south walls are about 6 feet (1.8 m) high and have moulded coping. In the centre of the east wall are gate piers with a square section and ball finials, and they are flanked by dwarf coped walls ramped down from the piers.	II*
Pavilions, Wootton Lodge; 52.99124°N 1.85795°W	—	17th century	The pavilions are similar, and are in stone with hipped tile roofs. They have two storeys and five bays. Each pavilion has a central doorway with a circular recessed panel above, cross windows in the ground floor with a continuous hood mould, and two-light mullioned windows in the upper floor.	II*
Gate piers and gates, Wootton Lodge; 52.99591°N 1.84410°W		18th century	The gate piers at the entrance to the drive are in stone and have a square section. They are rusticated, and each has a ball finial. Between them are wrought iron gates.	II
Gazebo and dovecote, Wootton Lodge; 52.99141°N 1.85946°W	—	18th century	The gazebo and dovecote is a building in stone with a tile roof and a roughly triangular plan. In the centre is a doorway, and on the sides are sash windows. Inside are square nesting boxes.	II
Coach house and stables, Unwin Farm; 53.00563°N 1.87524°W	—	Early 19th century	The coach house and stable are in stone with a tile roof. There are two storeys and three bays, the central bay gabled. In the middle is a carriage arch, and above it is a pitching hole with a keystone. Elsewhere there are doorways, one blocked, casement windows, a loft door, and the remains of steps.	II
