= Listed buildings in Ellastone =

Ellastone is a civil parish in the district of East Staffordshire, Staffordshire, England. It contains 33 buildings that are recorded in the National Heritage List for England. Of these, three are listed at Grade II*, the middle grade, and the others are at Grade II, the lowest grade. Historically, the most important building in the parish was Calwich Abbey, a priory that has been demolished and replaced by a country house, which is listed together with associated strictures in the surrounding parkland. The parish contains the village of Ellastone and the surrounding countryside. Here, most of the listed buildings are houses, cottages, farmhouses and farm buildings. The other listed buildings include a church, bridges, and two mileposts.

== Key ==
Grade	Criteria
II*	Particularly important buildings of more than special interest
II	Buildings of national importance and special interest

== Buildings ==
Name and location	Photograph	Date	Notes	Grade
St Peter's Church; 52.98822°N 1.82741°W		1586	The chancel is dated 1588, and the nave and north aisle were rebuilt in 1830. The church is built in stone with a tile roof and crested ridge tiles. It consists of a nave, a south porch, a north aisle, a chancel with a north chapel, and a west tower. The tower has three stages, diagonal buttresses, a west doorway, a three-light west window, an inscribed frieze, a sundial, a clock face on the west side, and an embattled parapet.	II*
Adam Bede's Cottage; 52.98801°N 1.82971°W	—	17th century (probable)	The house was extended and remodelled in the 19th century. It is roughcast on a sandstone plinth, and has a tile roof with fleur-de-lys crested ridge tiles. There is one storey and an attic, and an L-shaped plan, a two-bay range and a projecting 19th-century gabled wing on the right, and a further single-storey extension on the right. Both ranges contain canted bay windows with hipped roofs, and gabled dormers with shaped bargeboards. The doorway has a bracketed hood with decorative ironwork. Inside the house is an inglenook fireplace.	II
Cabin Knoll; 52.98995°N 1.79766°W	—	17th century	The house was remodelled and partly rebuilt in the 18th century. The original part is in stone, the later parts are in red brick, and the roof is tiled. There are three storeys and an L-shaped plan. The windows are casements, those in the middle floor with segmental heads.	II
Elms Farmhouse; 52.99157°N 1.83287°W	—	17th century	The farmhouse, which has been remodelled, has a timber framed core, refaced in painted brick, and a tile roof. There are two storeys and a T-shaped plan, consisting of a two-bay hall range, a two-bay parlour wing, and a single-storey extension. The windows are casements, some with segmental heads. Inside the farmhouse is a massive inglenook fireplace, and timber framed partitions.	II
Stone Cottage; 52.99055°N 1.83057°W	—	17th century	A stone farmhouse with a band, and a tile roof with coped verges on kneelers. There are two storeys and three bays. The porch is gabled, and the windows have two lights, chamfered surrounds and mullions, and contain casements. Inside there is an inglenook fireplace.	II
Ivy House, granary and dovecote 52.99125°N 1.83178°W	—	1667	The house was remodelled in about 1840, and is in stone with a tile roof. There are two storeys and a half-attic, and three bays, the central bay gabled. In the centre is a gabled porch that has square piers with moulded caps, and the door has a dated lintel. The windows have two lights and chamfered mullions, and contain casements with cast iron tracery and hood moulds. To the left is a low porch extension, and to the right are a recessed granary and a dovecote with external steps.	II
Church View; 52.98896°N 1.82786°W	—	1676	The house was later altered and extended. The main block is in stone and has a tile roof with coped verges on kneelers. There are two storeys and an attic, and two bays, and the windows are casements. To the left is an extension in sandstone and brick, with one storey and an attic, a tile roof, and a coped verge. There are sliding windows in the ground floor and in a gabled dormer. On the right is a single-storey brick extension with stone dressings. In the east gable end is a four-light window with chamfered mullions, and inside the house is a large inglenook fireplace.	II
Former cottage south of the Duncombe Arms public house 52.98603°N 1.82625°W	—	Late 17th or early 18th century	The cottage, later an outbuilding, is in stone with a tile roof. There are two storeys and three bays. It contains various doorways and windows.	II
Northwood Cottages; 52.99199°N 1.82162°W	—	Early 18th century (probable)	A terrace of four cottages that were remodelled in the 19th century, in stone with a tile roof. There is one storey and attics, and four gables on the front, the middle two larger. Some of the windows have retained their mullions.	II
Yew Trees and Yew Tree Gallery; 52.98703°N 1.82673°W	—	Early 18th century	A house incorporating a shop, it is in red brick with quoins, and a tile roof with coped verges on kneelers. There are two storeys, a main range of three bays, and a lower one-bay wing to the right. There are two doorways approached by steps and casement windows, all with segmental heads, and in the wing is a mullioned window.	II
Ellastone Old House; 52.98661°N 1.82653°W		Early to mid 18th century	A stone house, at one time an inn, on a moulded plinth, with floor bands, giant rusticated pilasters, a moulded eaves cornice, and a hipped tile roof. There are two storeys and an attic, five bays, a rear service wing, and a two-storey, three-bay extension to the left. Semicircular steps lead up to the central doorway that has Tuscan pilasters and a cornice. The two-light windows have moulded surrounds and chamfered mullions, and there is a gabled dormer. The extension contains garage doors, a stable door, and mullioned windows. To the left of the main range is a mounting block, and inside the house is an inglenook fireplace.	II*
Portobello Bridge; 52.98519°N 1.81258°W	—	18th century	The bridge crosses a mill race, and is in red brick with stone coping. The bridge consists of three semicircular arches, the central arch the largest. The coping forms a dwarf parapet, and there is an iron balustrade and a wooden rail.	II
Boathouse southeast of Portobello Bridge; 52.98509°N 1.81242°W	—	Late 18th century	The boathouse is in red brick with a parapet, corner pilasters, and corner finials. There are two storeys and a square plan, and it contains doorways with pointed heads, a doorway, and a rectangular opening.	II
Ellastone Bridge; 52.97881°N 1.82281°W		1777	The bridge carries the B5033 road over the River Dove. It is in sandstone, and consists of two wide segmental arches, flanked by similar shallower arches. The bridge has triangular cutwaters, hood moulds and keystones, a continuous string course, and a parapet with chamfered coping.	II
Calwich Abbey Temple, bridges gates, gate piers and railings 52.98576°N 1.80525°W	—	1797	A summer house and fishing lodge in stone, with a moulded eaves cornice, corner ball ornaments, a copper-covered dome, and a weathervane with a fish motif. There is a square plan, one storey, and a tetrastyle Doric portico with an inscribed oval plaque in the pediment. The doorway is flanked by round-headed niches, and the windows are sashes. On each side of the building is a cast iron hump-back bridge crossing a former mill race. The bridges have gates, rusticated gate piers and railings. On the southwest side are steps leading down to the water.	II*
Former cowhouse north of Dove Lane; 52.98252°N 1.82717°W	—	c.1800	The former cowhouse is in stone with a tile roof, and has one storey and a loft, and three bays. The openings include doorways and loft openings.	II
Wall, railings and pinnacles, Adam Bede's Cottage; 52.98805°N 1.82952°W	—	Early 19th century (probable)	The wall along the front of the garden is in stone and about 40 yards (37 m) long. Spaced along it are seven Gothic crocketed pinnacles. In the wall are two gateways, and a lower stretch of wall with cast iron fleur-de-lys railings.	II
Farm buildings north of Northwood Farmhouse; 52.99231°N 1.82102°W	—	Early 19th century	The farm buildings consist of cowhouses, stables, a granary and a cartshed. They are in stone with tile roofs, and form an L-shaped plan. The openings include doorways, stable doors, casement windows and windows with chamfered mullions.	II
Tower House; 52.98911°N 1.82784°W	—	Early 19th century	A pair of stone cottages with a tile roof, hipped to the right. There are two storeys and two bays. The doorways have rectangular fanlights with decorative glazing bars, and the windows are casements with picturesque cast iron tracery.	II
Ivies and three urns 52.99026°N 1.83098°W	—	Early to mid 19th century	The house, possibly incorporating earlier material, is in sandstone, and has a tile roof with fleur-de-lys ridge tiles, coped verges on kneelers, and a finial. There are two storeys and an attic, two parallel ranges, and three bays. The windows have chamfered mullions, and there is a gabled dormer. Inside there is an inglenook fireplace, and in the garden are three 18th-century inverted bell-shaped urns with concave bases, gadrooned bowls, and enriched rims.	II
Tit Bridge and causeway 52.98835°N 1.82343°W		Early to mid 19th century	The bridge carries the B5032 road over Tit Brook. It is in stone, and consists of a single semicircular arch with a plain parapet rising to a shallow apex, and continued for about 10 yards (9.1 m) to each side as a retaining wall to the road.	II
Hall Lodge; 52.99325°N 1.83593°W	—	c. 1840	The lodge, later a private house, is in stone, it has a pyramidal pantile roof surmounted by a spike, and is in Italianate style. There are two storeys, a main block with one bay and a lower one-bay wing. The windows are cross windows, and the upper floor in the main block has a balcony. In the wing is a porch with a round arch and a keystone, over which is a balustraded balcony.	II
Gate piers and walls, Hall Lodge; 52.99312°N 1.83581°W	—	c. 1840	The entrance to the drive is flanked by square rusticated stone gate piers with moulded caps and ball finials. Outside are coped walls about 20 feet (6.1 m) long with square end piers surmounted by ball finials. There is a gate in the left wall.	II
Calwich Abbey and garden steps 52.98683°N 1.80965°W		1849–50	A small country house on the site of a former priory. It is in stone with shaped quoins, moulded bands, a moulded eaves cornice, and slate roofs. The house has two storeys and four bays, and a lower service wing to the right. The windows have chamfered mullions, some also with transoms, and there are gabled dormers. At the rear of the house is an octagonal link, and stone steps lead down to the garden.	II
Former coach house and stable block, Calwich Abbey; 52.98686°N 1.80931°W		1849–50	The buildings are in stone with slate roofs and coped verges. The coach house is to the south, there are stable ranges on the east and west, and a wall with gate piers along the north, all surrounding a courtyard. In the centre of the south range is a cupola with a clock, a lead-covered concave-sided cap and a finial. Other features include segmental-headed coach arches, doorways with fanlights, gabled dormers with shaped and moulded coping, and a hipped louvre. The stone walls are coped, and the gate piers are square with moulded caps.	II
Farmyard complex, Calwich Home Farm; 52.98971°N 1.79920°W	—	Mid 19th century	The complex contains cowhouses, stables, a barn, and a horse engine shed. They are in stone, and have tile roofs with coped verges. The buildings form ranges around three sides of a courtyard. In the middle of the main range is a carriage arch over which is a square cupola with a pyramidal roof and a finial. At the rear is a five-sided horse engine house. The openings include doorways, windows, and vents, and there is an external fight of stone steps.	II
Stables and granary, Calwich Home Farm; 52.99002°N 1.79962°W	—	Mid 19th century	The stables and granary are in stone with a tile roof, and roughly a T-shaped plan. There is a central stable door and flanking windows, and external stone steps leading up to the granary.	II
Corner House; 52.98265°N 1.82705°W	—	Mid 19th century	A red brick house with stone quoins on the right side, and a tile roof. There are two storeys, a T-shaped plan, and a front of three bays. The central doorway is approached by steps, and has a shaped lintel grooved as voussoirs, and a raised keystone, and the windows are casements. The window above the doorway has a round head.	II
Dunscombe House; 52.98815°N 1.80770°W	—	Mid 19th century	A stone house with a slate roof, two storeys and three bays. The outer bays are gabled with bargeboards and a balustraded arch at the apex. In the centre is a gabled porch with coped verges on shaped kneelers. This is flanked by angled bay windows containing sashes with round arches, and the upper floor contains windows with chamfered mullions and sashes.	II
Milepost at N.G.R. SK 11484353; 52.98896°N 1.83046°W		Mid to late 19th century	The milepost is on the west side of Ribden Road. It is in cast iron and has a triangular plan and a chamfered top, On the top is inscribed "ELLASTONE" and on the sides are the distances to Leek, Ellastone, Rocester and Uttoxeter.	II
Milepost at N.G.R. SK 12574360; 52.98960°N 1.81432°W		Mid to late 19th century	The milepost is on the north side of the B5032 Road. It is in cast iron and has a triangular plan and a chamfered top, On the top is inscribed "ELLASTONE" and on the sides are the distances to Ellastone, Rocester, Uttoxeter, and Ashbourne.	II
