= Wootton Lodge =

Grade I listed gatehouse in the UK

Coordinates: 52°59′29″N 1°51′32″W

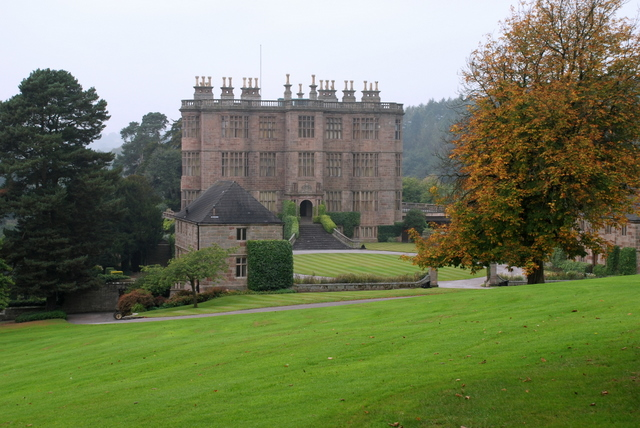
Wootton Lodge

Wootton Lodge is a privately owned 17th-century country house situated at Wootton near Ellastone, Staffordshire, England. It is a Grade I listed building.

== Architectural description ==
The impressive west entrance front has basements and three storeys topped by a balustraded parapet. Five main bays are flanked at north and south by three-sided angled bays, all windows being mullioned and transomed. The rear courtyard has a pair of matching pavilions which are Grade II* listed.

== History ==
The nearby Calwich Abbey estate, owned prior to the Dissolution of the Monasteries by the Priory of Kenilworth, was in 1543 granted by Henry VIII to John Fleetwood (High Sheriff of Staffordshire in 1548 and 1568), who converted the priory building into a house. Wootton Lodge was built about 1611 for Sir Richard Fleetwood Bt (High Sheriff in 1614), possibly by the architect Robert Smythson.

During the English Civil War the house was held for the Crown and was badly damaged during a Parliamentary siege. It was restored in about 1700 when a flight of balustrade entrance steps was added. Fleeing from Cromwell's army during the Civil War, one owner of Wootton Lodge took refuge in the coal cellar of Lower House at Prestwood. This had just been built by William Orpe, a member of one of Ellastone's oldest families, who had a strong connection with the nearby Croxden Abbey. The Orpes provided shelter for their Royalist friends. It was the home in 1800 of Thomas Wilson-Patten, who owned Oakamoor copper works.

During the 19th and 20th centuries the house was occupied by several tenants, including Granville, Dewes, Unwin and Heywood.

In the 1930s it was for four years the home of the British fascist leader Sir Oswald Mosley and his wife Diana Mitford.

In 1950, when great houses and their estates were being broken up due to heavy taxes and the lack of staff, the house was purchased by the then-famous war poet Major Alan Rook (of Skinner and Rook, wine merchants of Nottingham) to create two households: one for himself and his playwright partner Dennis Woodford, the other for his mother Dorothy Sophia Rook (in her youth one of the Brewills of Edwalton).

Latterly the estate was purchased and much improved by businessman J. C. Bamford and is still owned by his family.

Exterior shots of Wootton Lodge were used in the 1947 Technicolor film Blanche Fury, which starred Valerie Hobson and Stewart Granger.

== See also ==
- Grade I listed buildings in Staffordshire
- Listed buildings in Ramshorn
