= Wootton, Staffordshire =

Village in Staffordshire, England

Coordinates: 53.0033°N 1.8442°W

Wootton
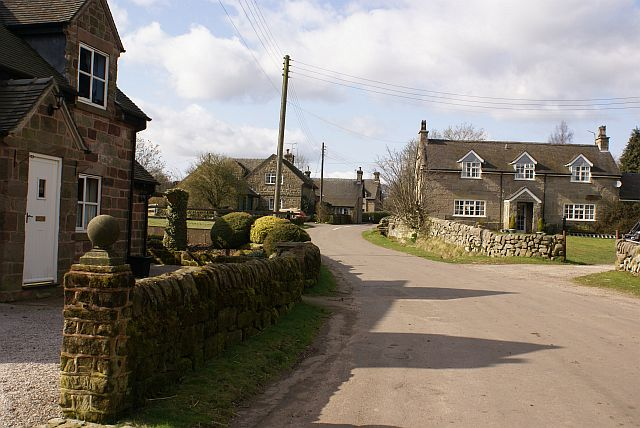
- Stone houses in Wootton

- Location within Staffordshire
- Population: 154 (2011)
- OS grid reference: SK1055345120
- Shire county: Staffordshire
- Region: West Midlands
- Country: England
- Sovereign state: United Kingdom
- Post town: Ashbourne
- Postcode district: DE6
- Police: Staffordshire
- Fire: Staffordshire
- Ambulance: West Midlands
- UK Parliament: Staffordshire Moorlands

Wootton is a village and civil parish in Staffordshire, England. The village is situated approximately 20 miles (30 km) east from Stoke-on-Trent and 20 miles (30 km) northwest from Derby.

== History ==
=== Toponymy ===
The name Wootton is thought to come from the Old English wudu meaning wood and tūn meaning an enclosure; farmstead; village or estate. This translates to Wood Farm/Settlement.

=== In Victorian times ===
In 1870-72 John Marius Wilson's Imperial Gazetteer described Wootton as

WOOTTON, a township in Ellastone parish, Stafford; 4½ miles W by S of Ashborne. Real property, £2,061. Pop., 185. Houses, 40. W. Hall was built by Inigo Jones; was the residence of Rousseau in 1766; and belongs now to the Bromleys.

— John Marius Wilson, Imperial Gazetteer of England and Wales, A. Fullarton, 1872

=== Industry ===
In early reports Wootton was predominantly a farming village, with over 60% of males engaged in agriculture. Even to this day there remains a large farming culture, with still around 25% of the working population engaged in agriculture. The rest of the population are spread out between working in service industries or in managerial/professional occupations.

== Notable Establishments ==
- Wootton Hall, the house where Rousseau stayed, was demolished in the 1930s.
- Wootton Lodge, the privately owned 17th century house, is a grade I listed building in the parish owned by the Bamford family. During the English Civil War the house was held for the Crown and was badly damaged during a Parliamentary siege. It was restored in about 1700 when a flight of balustraded entrance steps was added.
- Alton Towers Resort is a popular holiday amusement park with hotels and an indoor water park, located 4 miles (6.5 km) away from Wootton. The resort attracts 2.7 million visitors annually. The resort encloses an area known as "Slain Hollow", reputed to be the site of a battle between King Ceolred of Mercia and King Ina of Wessex in 716 AD.

== In poetry ==
A rich poetic description of the area around Wootton is The vales of Wever, a loco-descriptive poem (1797) by John Gisborne, written as a present to his host after staying at Wootton Hall. It shows the influence of Erasmus Darwin, who also wrote similar topographic poetry on the district, and it was admired by many poets including Wordsworth.

== Transport ==
Wootton is located about 1.5 miles off the B5032 Uttoxeter to Ashbourne road, and is served by the 409 bus service between those two towns, which stops at Ellastone village. The nearest railway station is in Uttoxeter around 8 miles (12.5 km) away which has regular trains to Crewe and Derby.
