= Joseph Bamford =

English businessman (1916–2001)

Joseph Bamford CBE
- Bamford in 1971
- Born: Joseph Cyril Bamford; 21 June 1916; Uttoxeter, Staffordshire, England
- Died: 1 March 2001 (aged 84); London, England
- Education: Stonyhurst College
- Occupation: Businessman
- Years active: 1945–2001
- Known for: J.C. Bamford Excavators (JCB)
- Successor: Anthony Bamford
- Spouse: Marjorie Griffin (m. 1941)
- Children: Anthony Bamford; Mark Bamford
- Relatives: Jo Bamford (grandson)

Joseph Cyril Bamford (21 June 1916 – 1 March 2001) was a British businessman. He was the founder of J.C. Bamford Excavators Limited (JCB), a manufacturer of heavy equipment.

== Biography ==
Joseph Bamford was born into a recusant Catholic family in Uttoxeter, Staffordshire, which owned Bamfords Ltd, an agricultural engineering business.

His great-grandfather Henry Bamford was born in Yoxall and had built up his own ironmongers business, which by 1881 employed 50 men, 10 boys and 3 women. Bamfords International Farm Machinery became one of the country's major agricultural equipment suppliers, famous for its balers, rakes, hay turners, hay wufflers, mangold cutters, and standing engines, which were exported all over the world. The company eventually ceased trading in 1986.

After attending Stonyhurst College, he joined the Alfred Herbert company in Coventry, then the UK's largest machine-tool manufacturer, and rose to represent the firm in Ghana. He returned home in 1938 to join the family firm, but in 1941 was called up by the RAF to serve in World War II. Working in supply and logistics, he returned to the African Gold Coast to run a staging post for USAF planes being ferried to the Middle East.

=== JCB ===
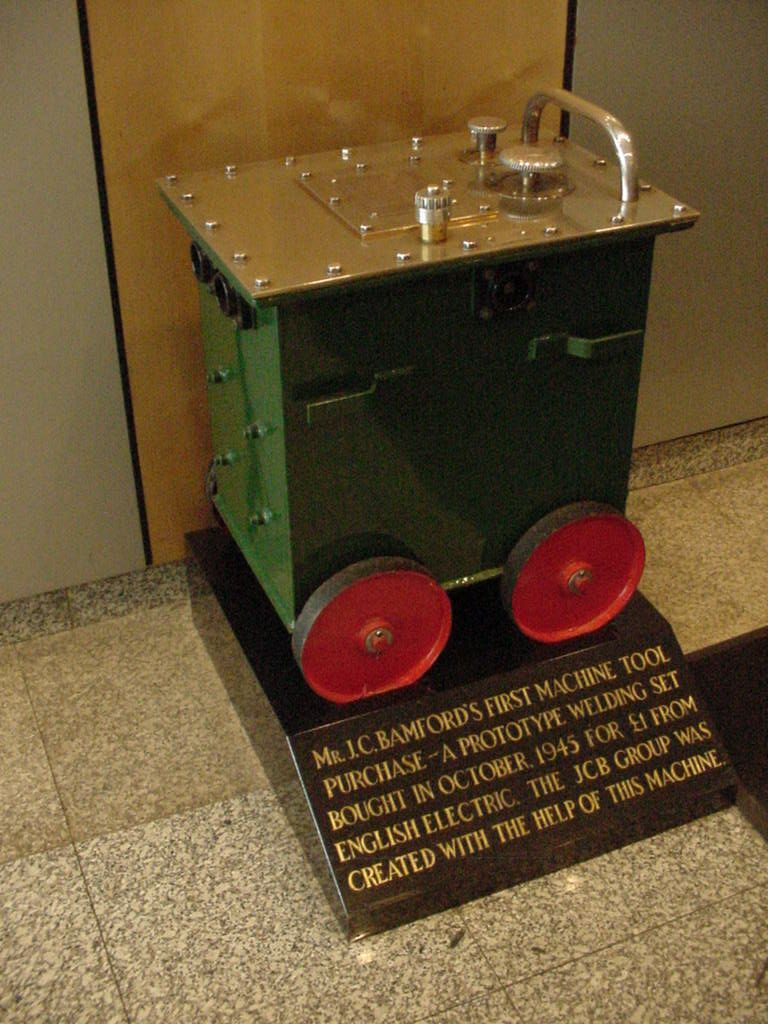
Bamford's first welding set

Upon his return home in 1944, Bamford initially worked for English Electric developing electric welding equipment in Stafford. A short return stint with the family firm proved too stifling, and his uncle Henry released him, saying he thought Joe had "little future ahead of him." After selling Brylcreem for a short while, in October 1945 Bamford rented a 10 by 15 ft (3 by 5 m) lock-up garage for 30 shillings (= £1.50) a week, and made a farm trailer from scrap steel and war surplus Jeep axles, using a prototype electric welder bought for £2-10s (= £2.50). He opened for business on the day his first son, Anthony, was born, and sold the trailer for £45 and a cart, which he also repaired and sold for another £45.

Having no interest in taking over rival businesses, his philosophy of: "Focus on what you do best, be innovative, and re-invest in product development and the latest manufacturing technologies;" resulted in a series of market-leading innovations:

- 1948 – introduced the first hydraulic tipping trailer in Europe
- 1950 – moved to an old cheese factory in Rocester where the workforce totalled six
- 1951 – began painting his machinery yellow
- 1953 – brought out his breakthrough product, the backhoe loader
- 1957 – brought out the "hydra-digga", incorporating the excavator and the major loader as a single all-purpose tool which was useful for both the agricultural as well as construction industry, which JCB grew with
- 1991 – brought out the JCB Fastrac high speed agricultural tractor.

In 1958, he bought ten motorscooters with the number plates JCB1 to JCB10, to get their number plates to transfer to his firm's vehicles.

With exports to the United States beginning, profits increased from 1960 onwards. JCB won seven Queen's Awards for Exports as its sales spread to more than 130 countries around the world, while Bamford himself was appointed a CBE for Services to Export in 1969. In 1993, he became the first British citizen to be honoured in the Association of Equipment Manufacturers Hall of Fame, and remained the only British inductee until his son Anthony was inducted in 2008.

=== Marketing ===
What made Bamford different from many engineers was that he was also a marketeer. Bamford personally demanded to know daily from his staff how many "JCB Yellow" vehicles were off the road awaiting spares. Bamford created an image that JCBs were there to work, and if an owner-operator's machine was down, then Bamford wanted to know about it—which gained him 95% of the owner-operator market in the UK.

Bamford placed a 12 V socket into the cab of his vehicles, and delivered the first 100 personally, arriving in his Rolls-Royce with number plate JCB1. One of the first Learjets in Europe was purchased to fly in non-UK customers (the fleet has since got larger), who were met by another European first, a stretched Cadillac with the same number of seats as the jet. Bamford also conceived the "dancing diggers," whose 1999 display in Las Vegas stopped the gamblers.

=== Personal life ===
A non-smoking teetotaller, who was so careful with his money that he claimed his wife still made their own curtains, Bamford worked from 09:00 until 23:00 every day. He saw his role in life to be like the Nonconformist Cadbury and Lever families. He built Rocester along the lines of Bournville and Port Sunlight into an effective marketing home for the company, and an efficient production centre and a virtual "home" for his employees. He saw no need to recognise trade unions. The Rocester works were surrounded by 10,000 acres (40 km^{2}) of landscaped grounds in which his company's employees could shoot, fish, swim, and sail.

Bamford paid more than fair wages, which rose regularly, and annual bonuses based on reports of individual worth. In 1967 Bamford stood on a farm cart and handed out personal cheques totalling £250,000. This extraordinary focus in return gave unprecedented levels of workforce flexibility, with the average JCB employee through the strike-dominated 1970s and early 1980s, being seven times more productive than the average British manufacturing worker.

=== Retirement ===
In 1975, Bamford left his wife Marjorie (née Griffin – married 1941), handed over the business to their two sons Anthony and Mark, and set up home with his secretary, Jayne Ellis, in Switzerland as tax exiles. He continued to design both boats and diesel engines. Bamford was awarded the honorary degree of a Doctor of Technology from both Loughborough University in 1983 and Keele University in 2000.

His grandson, Jo Bamford, briefly worked at JCB before moving into the hydrogen energy sector.

Bamford died in a London clinic on 1 March 2001. At his death, JCB was the largest privately owned engineering company in Britain, employing 4,500 people and manufacturing 30,000 machines a year in 12 factories on three continents. It had revenues of £850m in 1999, earned from 140 countries.

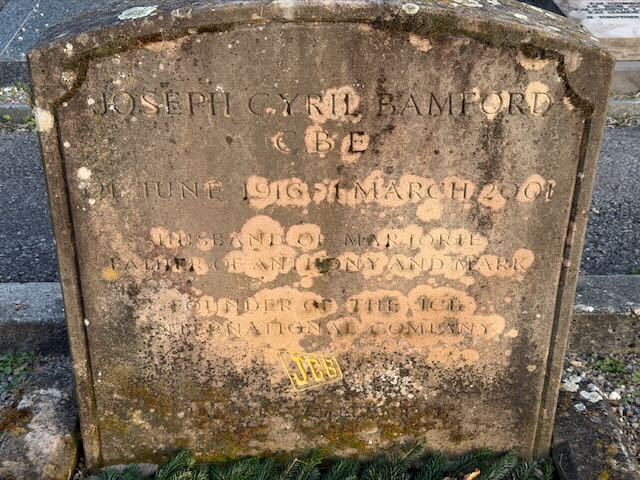
Grave of Joseph Cyril Bamford, founder of JCB company, located in Glion, Switzerland

He is buried in the cemetery of Glion, Switzerland, where his headstone is simply marked with the logo of the company he founded.

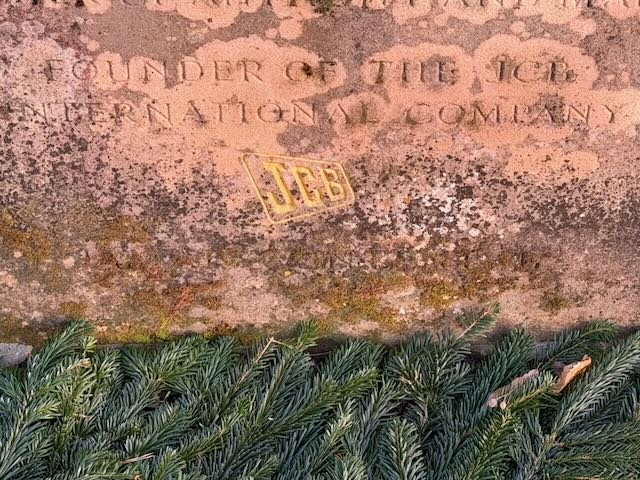
Grave of Joseph Cyril Bamford, founder of JCB company, located in Glion, Switzerland

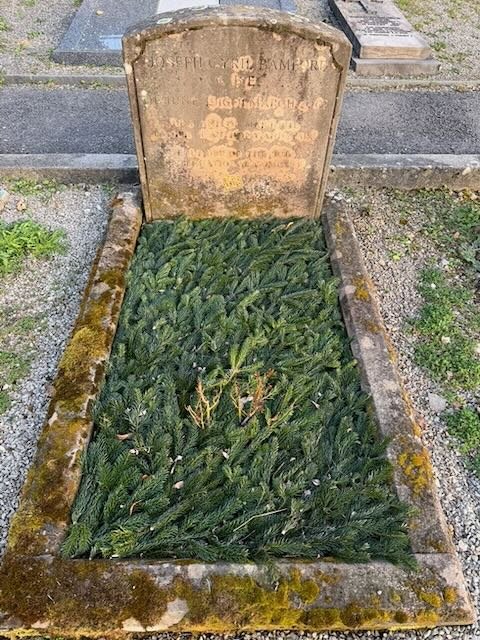
Grave of Joseph Cyril Bamford, founder of JCB company, located in Glion, Switzerland

His portraits by Lucinda Douglas-Menzies and Leslie Smithers (whilst he was still the head of his JCB empire) are in the National Portrait Gallery.
