= JCB Fastrac =

Medium to large tractor manufactured by JCB

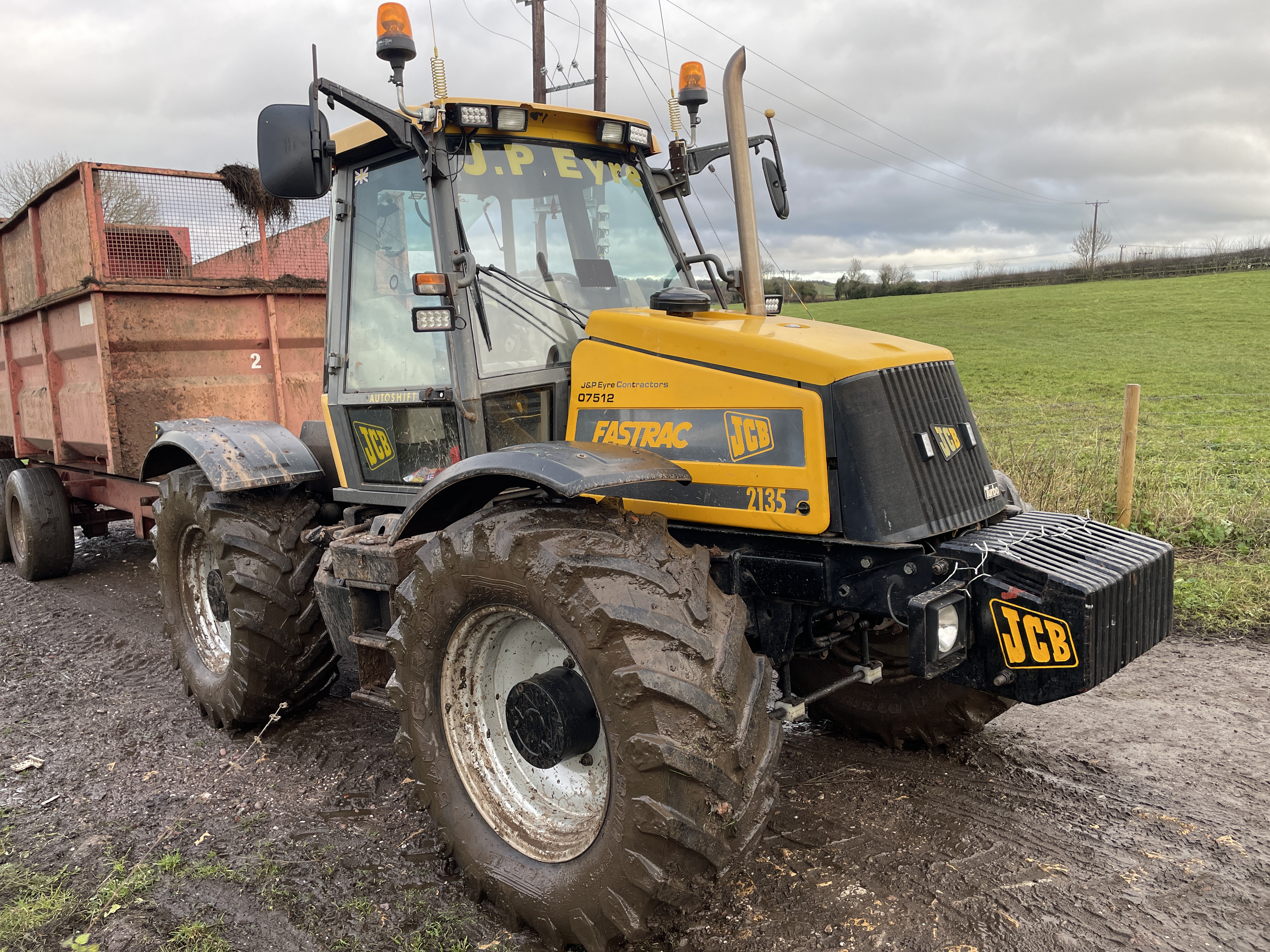
- Fastrac 2135

Overview
- Manufacturer: JCB
- Production: 1991–present

The JCB Fastrac is a high-speed agricultural tractor series manufactured by JCB Landpower, part of the JCB group.

Production began in 1991, with continual development to the present day. Generally the maximum speed of most models is 65 km/h (40 mph), but slower (40 km/h) and faster (80 km/h) versions are produced.

== Design ==
=== Engine ===
All models have six-cylinder diesel engines. Initially supplied by Perkins Engines then Cummins, the current supplier is AGCO Power and FPT.

=== Gearbox ===
Three different gearboxes have been fitted to the Fastrac in production.

- The first type has evolved over several years.
1. On introduction of the Fastrac this style of gearbox had 18 forward gears (6×3) and 6 reverse (6×1). These were organised as 6 manual gears in each of 3 ranges (Low, Medium and High). The range box also selected reverse giving 6 reverse gears with speeds similar to medium in forwards. All gear changes were made with the use of a dry clutch.
2. This gearbox then had a 2-speed powershift section added after the dry clutch and before the 6-speed gearbox. This resulted in 36 forward gears (2×6×3) and 12 reverse (2×6×1).
3. Following this the 2-speed powershift section was changed to 3-speed version. Giving 54 forward gears (3×6×3) and 18 reverse gears (3×6×1)
4. The latest version of this gearbox a wet clutch replaced the dry clutch still with 54 forward and 18 reverse gears.
- The second type fitted to 4000, 6000, 8000 Fastrac models features a CVT (IVT) hydrostatic power-split gearbox which is one of the most advanced tractor gearboxes available.
- The third type developed most recently and fitted to 7000 Series and 3000 Xtra machines has a wet main clutch, a six-speed powershift section and a four-speed range box. As reverse is at the front of the powershift section the reverse gears are spread throughout the speed range. This arrangement gives 24 forward gears (2×3×4) and 12 reverse gears (1×3×4). Note that the top three reverse gears are not available for use.

=== Four wheel drive ===
All models are selectable four-wheel drive. The rear axle is driven as standard and drive to the front axle selected by the driver, through a hydraulically controlled clutch. This clutch is sprung on to give four-wheel drive and hydraulically disengaged to give two-wheel drive.

=== Axles ===
Most Fastrac axles have a central differential and epicyclic gearing reduction units built into the hub ends, where the wheel bolts.

The 7000 Series rear axle has a central differential and has in-board epicyclic gearing reduction units.

=== Axle locking differentials ===
A standard locking differential is provided in the rear axle of all machines.

100, 1000, 2000 and 4000 Series machines have a Detroit No-Spin-style differential lock in front axle.

3000, 7000 and 8000 Series machines have a driver-controlled clutch pack engaged locking differential.

=== PTO ===
A two-speed power take-off (PTO) is standard at the rear and a factory option at the front. Depending on the model either speeds of 1000/540 or 1000/750 are available.

=== Suspension ===
Multi-link suspension is fitted between the chassis and both the front and rear beam axles.

The front suspension on most machines uses four links, a panhard rod and anti-roll bar. On the 4000 series a V-link is used at the front.

The rear suspension uses two lower link and a V-link on top plus an anti-roll bar.

Hydropneumatic suspension is used on the rear of all models and on the front of the 4000 and 7000 series Fastrac. This is similar to that used on some Citroën cars.

=== Front axle steering ===
1000, 2000 and 4000 Series Machines

These Fastrac machines have hydrostatic steering similar to most agricultural tractors with only a hydraulic link between the steering wheels and the front wheels. This limits the maximum speed of these models to 50 km/h (31 mph), except now in Germany where 60 km/h (37 mph) is allowed.

100, 3000, 7000, 8250, 8280 and 8310 Series Machines

These machines have mechanical power steering similar to a large truck. This system gives a mechanical link between the steering wheel and the front wheels. Generally these machines have had a maximum speed of 65 km/h (40 mph) except some 100 and 3000 series machines having a maximum speed of 75 km/h (47 mph).

8290 and 8330 Machines

These machines have dual circuit hydrostatic steering allowing legal speeds over 60 km/h.

An automatic Global Positioning System-controlled steering system using a (Differential GPS) is available for the 3000, 4000, 7000 and 8000 series machines.

=== Rear axle steering ===
Rear wheel steering (four-wheel steering) is available as an option on 2000 and 4000 series machines. The electronic system has 5 modes of operation, and only allows four-wheel steering below 20 km/h (12 mph).

- Two-Wheel Steer
- Proportional
- True Track
- Delay Mode
- Crab Steer

=== Brakes ===
All models are fitted with large diameter external disc brakes at both front and rear individually on each wheel. An anti-lock braking system (ABS) is fitted on some models, depending on the maximum vehicle speed and legal requirements.

=== Auxiliary hydraulics ===
An auxiliary hydraulic system (hydraulic drive system) is standard on all machines. It is used to control the front and rear linkages and through quick connectors at the front and rear of the tractor to control and power implements.

=== Three-point hitch ===
A three-point hitch is standard at the rear of the machine and on option on front.

=== Rear trailer hitch ===
There are several types available depending on the country the machine is built for.

- Pick-up hitch
- PTO drawbar
- Rockinger ladder
- Grand Piton
- 80 mm ball coupling

=== Cab ===
Traditionally the cab has been centrally mounted. Some models, the 7000 series and latter 8250, have the cab mounted at the rear of the tractor. The most recent Fastrac iteration, the 4000 series tractors, have forward sloping cabs, similar to those on combine harvesters. All cabs have a full-size passenger seat and an air suspensioned driver's seat.

== Models produced ==
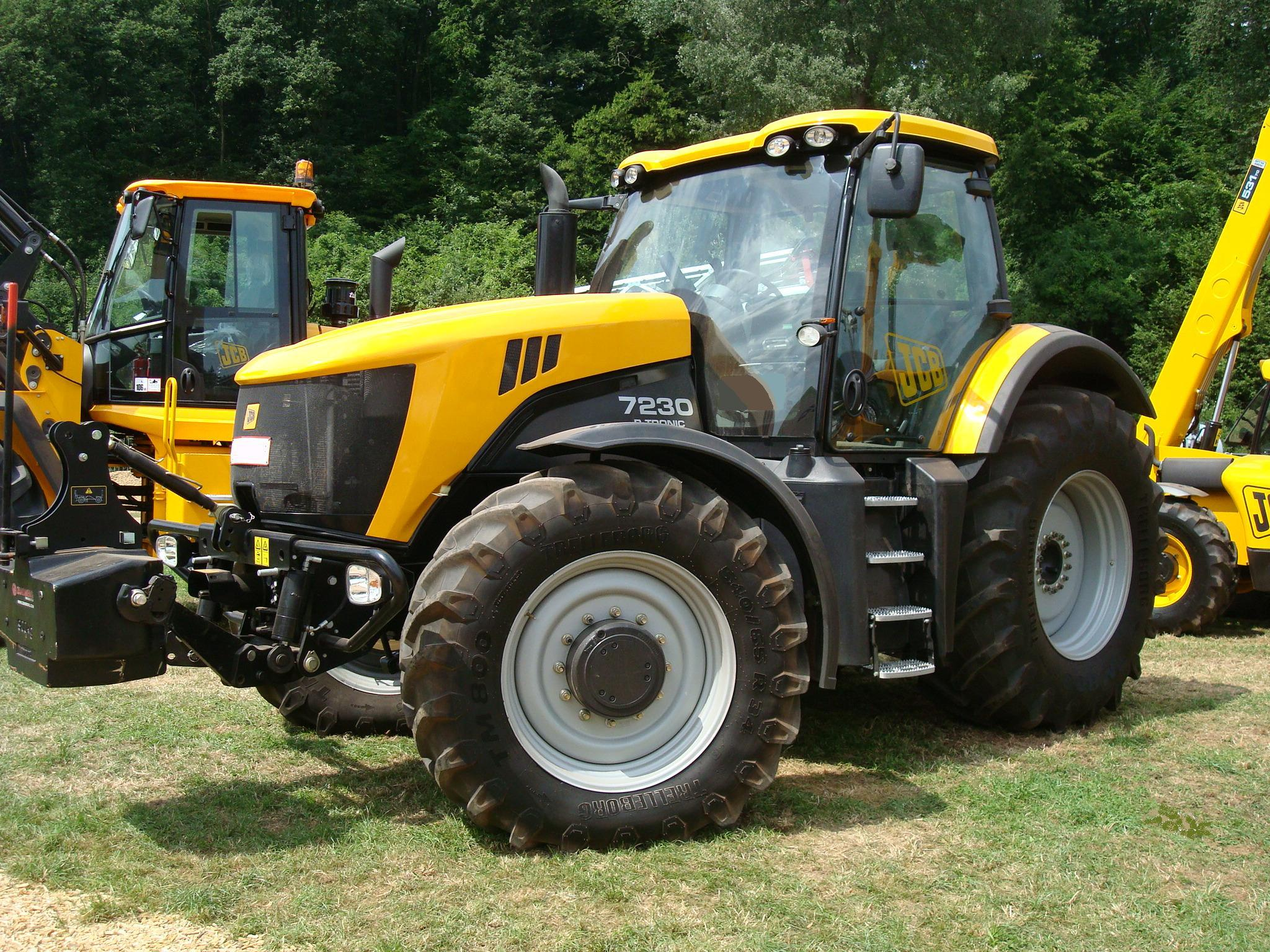
JCB 7230

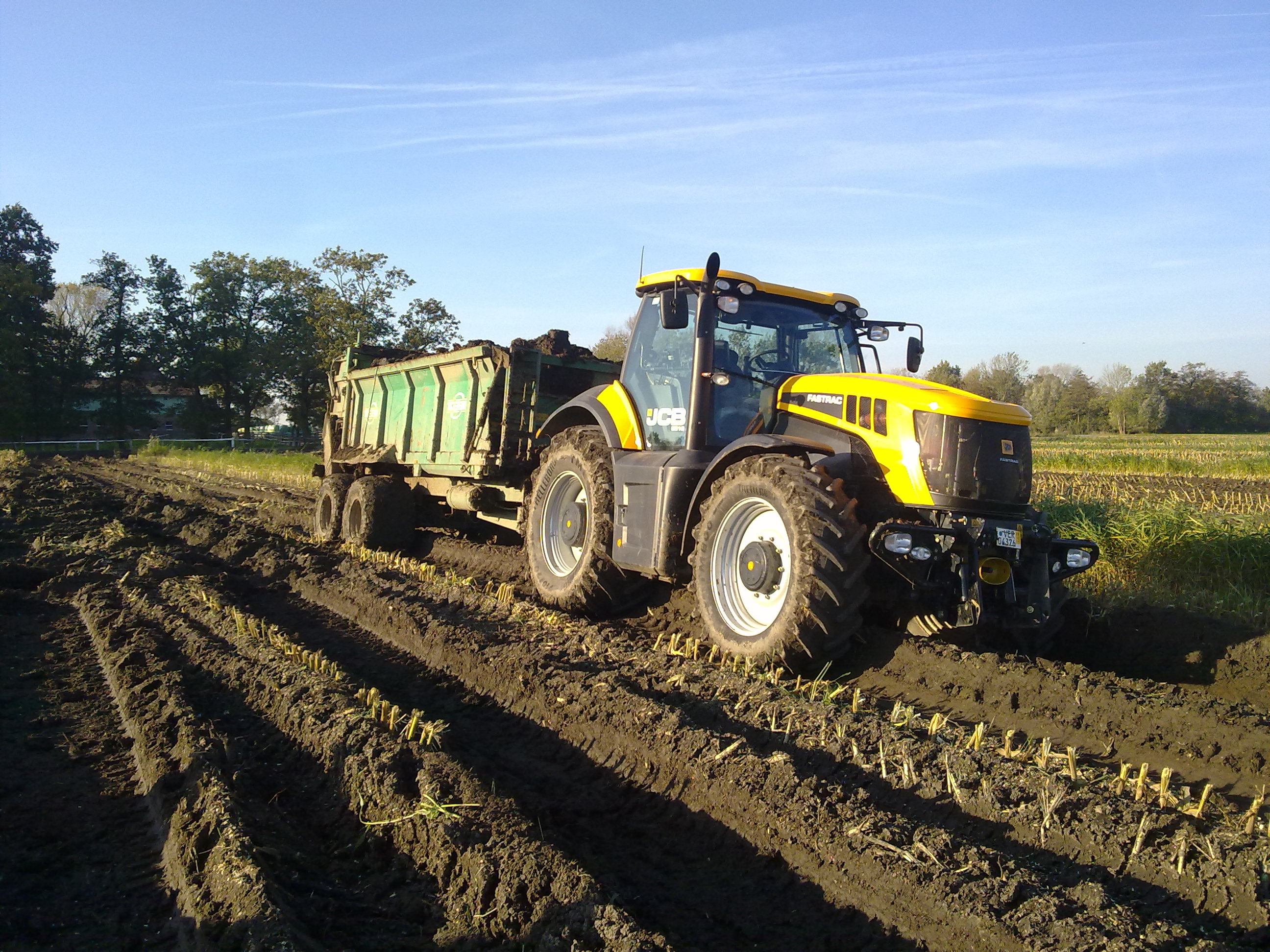
Fastrac 8310 with a muck spreader

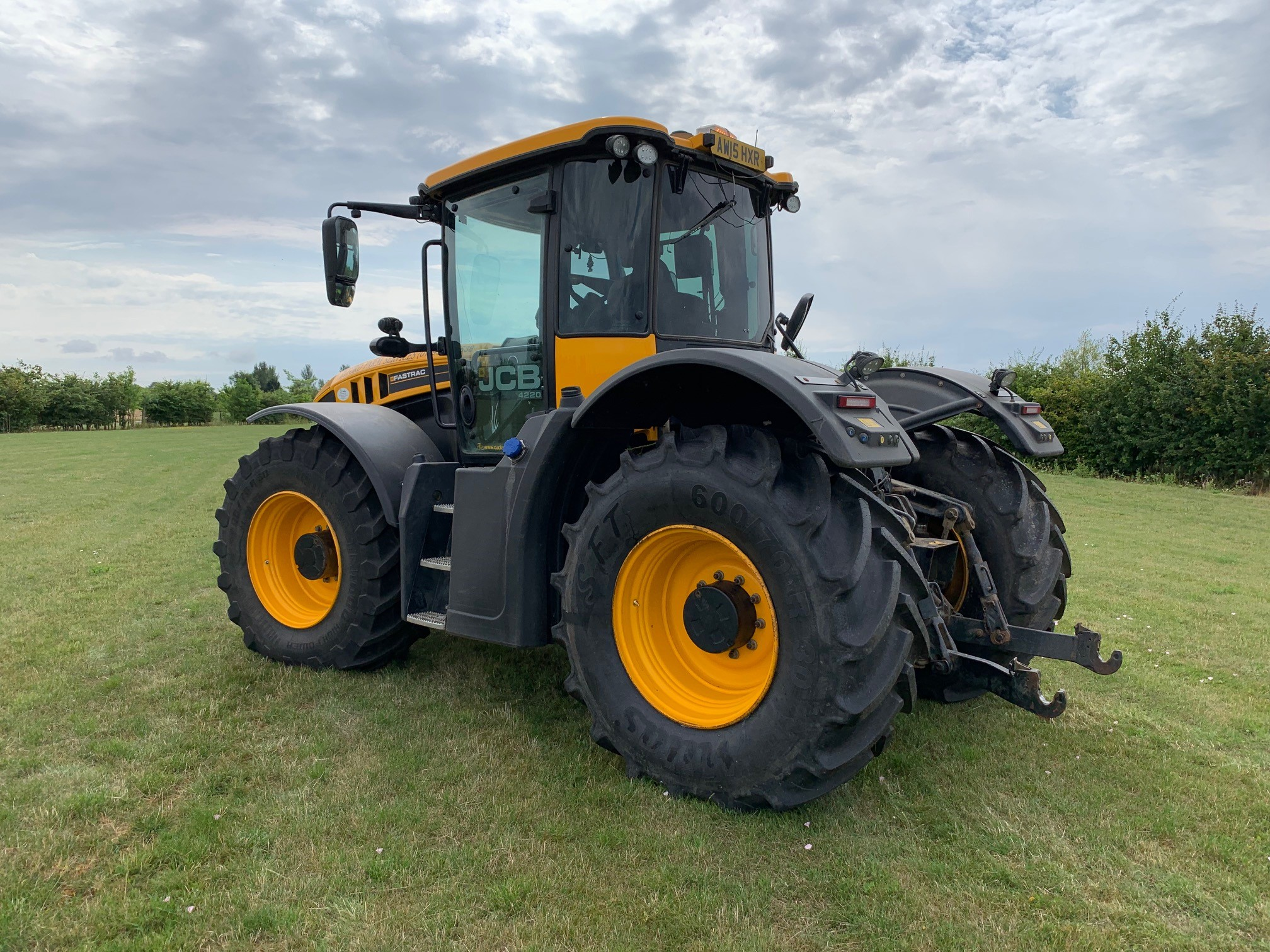
A 2015 JCB Fastrac 4220

This is not intended to be a complete list but includes the main models produced.

- 125 and 145 (Discontinued) – The first models produced in 1991. Fitted with Perkins 6L engines
- 135 and 155 (Discontinued) – Updated 125 and 145 models
- 185 (Discontinued) – The first machine to use the Cummins 5.9L engine
- 1115 and 1135 (Discontinued) – The first smaller Fastrac with hydrostatic steering
- 2115 and 2135 (Discontinued) – Updated 1115 and 2135 models
- 2150 (Discontinued)- Larger 2000 series machine (No 4WS option)
- 3155 and 3185 (Discontinued) – Upgraded machines developed from the 155 and 185
- 3190 and 3220 (Discontinued) – Machines fitted with Cummins 5.9L engines using electronic fuel injection
- 3200 and 3230 (Discontinued) – Machines fitted with Cummins 6.7L engines using electronic fuel injection
- 8250 (Discontinued) – The only Fastrac fitted with a CVT gearbox and an 8.3L Cummins engine
- 2155 and 2170 (Discontinued) – Updated 2000 series with 6.7L Cummins engines
- 7170, 7200 and 7230 (Discontinued) – A range of machines with a 6×4 gearbox and 6.7L Cummins engines
- 7270 (Discontinued) – A 270 hp 7000 series machine fitted with a 6.7L Cummins engine, launched at SIMA 2009
- 3200 and 3230 Xtra (Discontinued) – The 3000 series machines are now fitted with the 6×4 gearbox and Cummins 6.7L engine.
- 8280 and 8310 (Discontinued) – Machines fitted with AGCO SISU Power 8.4L engines and CVT gearbox
- 3200 and 3230 Xtra (Discontinued) – The 3000 series machines shown at Agritechnica 2011 with SISU 7.4L Engines and 6x4 gearbox
- 4160, 4190 and 4220 Models, now in production, fitted with AGCO SISU Power 6.6L T4f and StV engines, CVT gearbox and Four-Wheel Steer
- 8290 and 8330 Models – Machines fitted with AGCO SISU Power 8.4L T4f and StV engines and CVT gearbox
- 6260 and 6300 Models - Machines fitted with 6.7-litre FPT engines and ZF CVT gearbox

== World's fastest tractor ==
JCB currently holds the world record for the Fastest Tractor (Modified), this was achieved on 23 October 2019 by driver Guy Martin, averaging 217.570 km/h (135.19 mph) over two timed kilometres, with a top speed of 153.771 mph (247.47 km/h), in Elvington, North Yorkshire.

== Feature in media ==
A JCB Fastrac was chosen by BBC's Top Gear host Jeremy Clarkson. It was driven on the show around the Top Gear Test Track by The Stig, in a time of 2:57.4, making it the fastest of the three featured tractors, but also currently the fifth-slowest-ever lap time.

A JCB Fastrac appeared in news coverage of the JCB Dieselmax land speed record car, pushing it to its 30 mph starting speed.

In 2019 a Channel 4 documentary was aired on the production of a modified 1000 horse power JCB Fastrac, in an attempt to break the Guinness World Records entry for the world fastest modified tractor. The tractor designed to be capable of in excess of 150 mph, and achieving 153.771 mph (247.47 km/h) on its official record attempt.
