= Calwich Abbey =

Priory and two country houses in England

- Location within Staffordshire
- Interactive map of Calwich Abbey

Monastery information
- Other name: Calwich Priory
- Order: Benedictine
- Established: c.1130
- Disestablished: 1532

Site
- Location: near Ellastone, Staffordshire, England
- Coordinates: 52.9868°N 1.8097°W
- Public access: Yes

Calwich Abbey, previously Calwich Priory, was in turn the name of a medieval Augustinian priory and two successive country houses built on the same site near Ellastone, Staffordshire.

== Calwich Priory ==
It was founded circa 1130 as a satellite cell of Kenilworth Priory and was dedicated to St Margaret. In 1349 it became independent from Kenilworth with the right to elect its own prior. It was always a small and relatively poor establishment. After the death of the prior in 1530 only one canon remained in residence and in 1532 the house was suppressed and handed over to Rocester Abbey for disposal. By 1543 the property had been acquired by the Fleetwood family, who converted the priory buildings into a dwelling house.

== Calwich Abbey country house ==
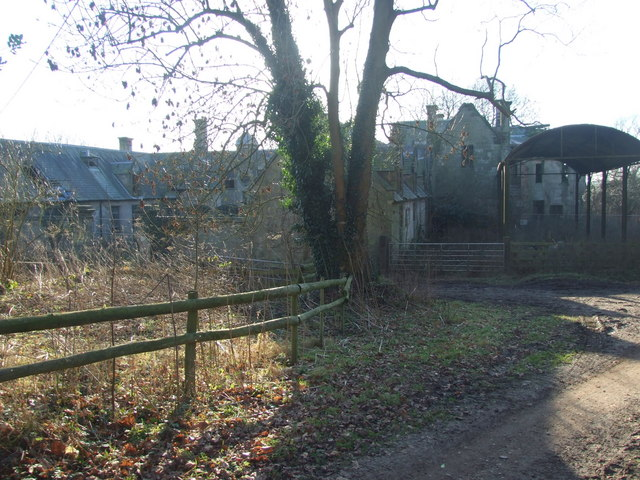
Derelict stable block, Calwich Abbey

The estate was purchased from the Fleetwoods by Bernard Granville. He demolished the priory house and built a new house nearer the stream which he turned into a lake. Granville died childless in 1775, bequeathing the property to his nephew, the Reverend John D'Ewes, who assumed the surname Granville on inheriting the estate. He also left the estate in 1826 to a nephew, Court D'Ewes, who similarly adopted the surname Granville. This house hosted visits by Erasmus Darwin, Handel, Anna Seward and the philosopher, Rousseau.

The estate was then acquired by the Duncombe family in the 1840s, who rebuilt the house in 1849–50 on higher ground in a Jacobean style by architect William Burn. It was constructed of ashlar with slate roofs in two storeys to an irregular floor plan.

Much of the house was demolished in 1927. The remaining building and stables, although Grade II listed, is in a derelict state. A fishing temple, built next to the river, survives.

In May 2015 Calwich Abbey Estate was offered for sale and in June 2015 it was announced that it had been bought by Garrick Sayers for £2 million.

== See also ==
- Listed buildings in Ellastone
