= JCB (heavy equipment manufacturer) =

British multinational equipment manufacturer

J.C. Bamford Excavators Limited
- Trade name: JCB
- Type: Private limited company
- Industry: Heavy equipment Agricultural machinery
- Founded: October 23, 1945; 81 years ago
- Founder: Joseph Cyril Bamford
- Headquarters: Rocester, Staffordshire, England
- Key people: Anthony Bamford (Chairman); Graeme Macdonald (Chief Executive)
- Products: Backhoes; Excavators; Dumpster; Forklift trucks Loaders; Telescopic handlers Tractors; Diesel engines Diesel generators Axles and Gearboxes
- Revenue: £5.3 billion (2023)
- Net income: £838 million (2023)
- Number of employees: c. 10,000 (2023)
- Website: www.jcb.com

J.C. Bamford Excavators Limited, commonly known as JCB, is a British multinational private company that produces equipment for construction, agriculture, waste handling, and demolition. It was founded in 1945 and is based in Rocester, Staffordshire, England.

The word "JCB" has come to be used colloquially as a generic description for mechanical diggers and excavators, and the word appears in the Oxford English Dictionary, although it is still held as a trademark.

== History ==
Joseph Cyril Bamford Excavators Ltd. was founded by Joseph Cyril Bamford in October 1945 in Uttoxeter, Staffordshire, England. He rented a lock-up garage 3.7 by 4.6 m (12 by 15 ft). In it, using a welding set which he bought second-hand for £1 from English Electric, he made his first product, a tipping trailer from war-surplus materials. The trailer's sides and floor were made from steel sheet that had been part of air raid shelters. On the same day as his son Anthony was born, he sold the trailer at a nearby market for £45 (plus a part-exchanged farm cart) and at once made another trailer. At one time he made machines in Eckersley's coal yard in Uttoxeter. The first trailer and the welding set have been preserved.

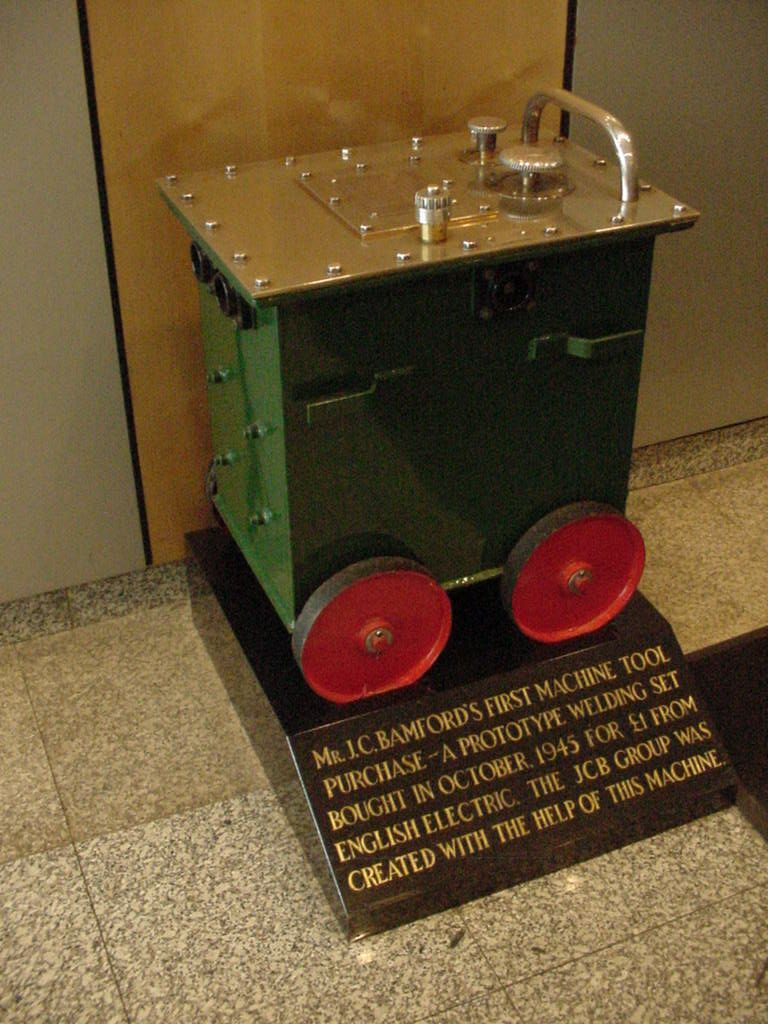
JCB's first welding set

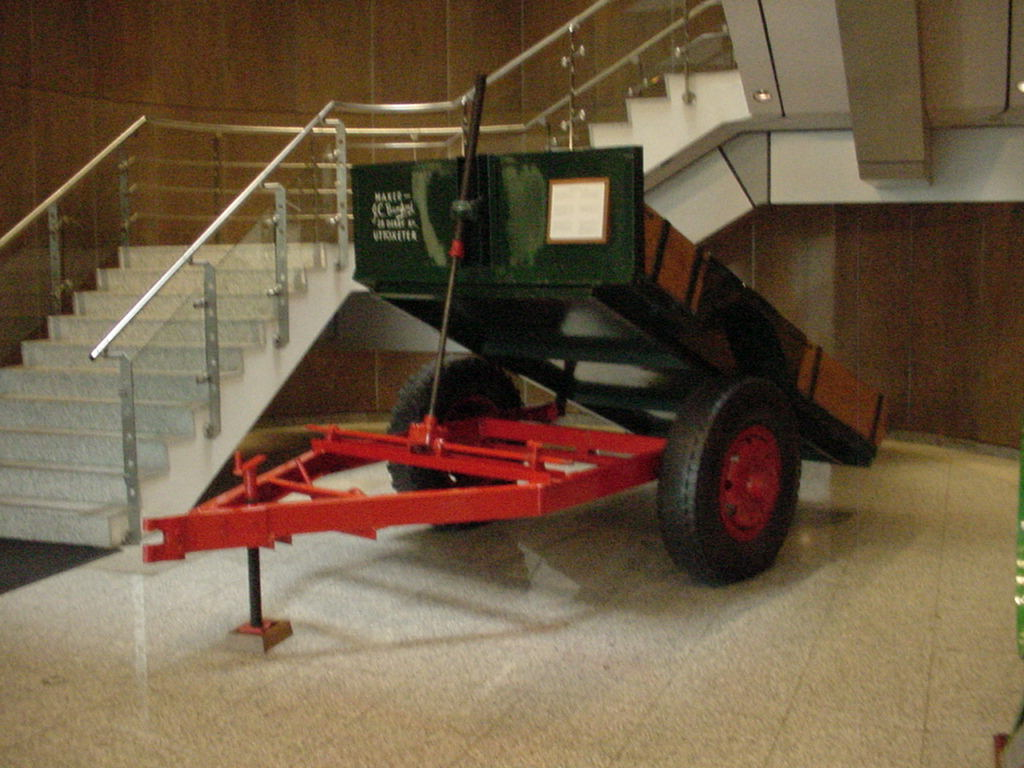
The first product JCB made (a farm trailer)

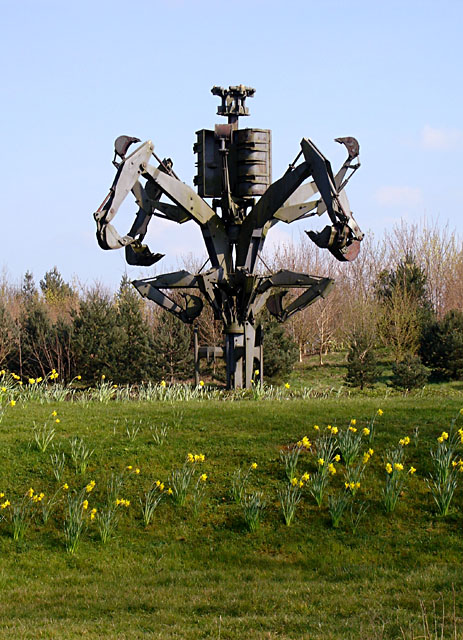
The Fossor (1979) by Walenty Pytel, made from parts of JCB machines, at the headquarters in Rocester

In 1948, six people were working for the company, and it made the first hydraulic tipping trailer in Europe. In 1950, it moved to an old cheese factory in Rocester, still employing six. A year later, Bamford began painting his products yellow. In 1953, he developed JCB's first backhoe loader, and the JCB logo appeared for the first time. It was designed by Derby Media and advertising designer Leslie Smith. In 1957, the firm launched the "hydra-digga", incorporating the excavator and the major loader as a single all-purpose tool useful for the agricultural and construction industries.

By 1964, JCB had sold over 3,000 3C backhoe loaders. The next year, the first 360-degree excavator was introduced, the JCB 7.

In 1975, Anthony Bamford, Bamford's son, was made chairman of the company, at the age of 30.

In 1978, the Loadall machine was introduced. The next year, the firm started its operation in India. In 1991, the firm entered a joint venture with Sumitomo of Japan to produce excavators, which ended in 1998. Two years later, a JCB factory was completed in Pooler near Savannah, Georgia, in the US, and in 2012 a factory was opened in Brazil.

In 2005, JCB bought a company, purchasing the German equipment firm Vibromax. In the same year, it opened a new factory in Pudong, China. Planning of a new £40M JCB Heavy Products site began following the launch of an architectural design competition in 2007 managed by RIBA Competitions, and by the next year, the firm began to move from its old site on Pinfold Street in Uttoxeter to the new site beside the A50; the Pinfold Street site was demolished in 2009. During that year, JCB announced plans to make India its largest manufacturing hub. Its factory at Ballabgarh, Faridabad in Haryana was to become the world's largest backhoe loader manufacturing facility. Although JCB shed 2,000 jobs during the Great Recession, in 2010 it rehired up to 200 new workers.

In 2013, JCB set up its fourth manufacturing facility in India. In 2014, it was reported that three out of every four pieces of construction equipment sold in India was a JCB, and that its Indian operations accounted for 17.5% of its total revenue. JCB-based memes have also become prevalent in India.

JCB began manufacturing 20-30 tonne excavators in Solnechnogorsky District in Russia in 2017. Due to trade sanctions imposed following the 2022 Russian invasion of Ukraine, JCB suspended its operations in Russia in March 2022.

JCB's turnover in 2023 was £6.5bn with profit before tax of £805.8m. Oxford Economics found that JCB contributes "£2.8bn to national GDP, £739m to the Exchequer and 41,200 jobs overall to the UK economy".

In 2026, it was added to the UN human rights database of businesses who are contributing to Israel's illegal occupation of Palestine. Selling machines to Israel both for military purposes and demolition of civilian homes. The company challenged their inclusion in this list claiming it is not their responsibility how their equipment is used after they have sold it because it is sold through a third party distributor. ^{[19]}

In September 2026, George Bamford - youngest child of Anthony Bamford - was named joint chairman of the company, positioning him as successor to his father.

== Products ==
Video of a JCB backhoe loader excavating mud to a truck

JCB began producing tipping trailers before quickly developing retrofit accessories for other machinery. This included the Major Loader - a kit to add a front loader and rear backhoe to a Fordson Major tractor.

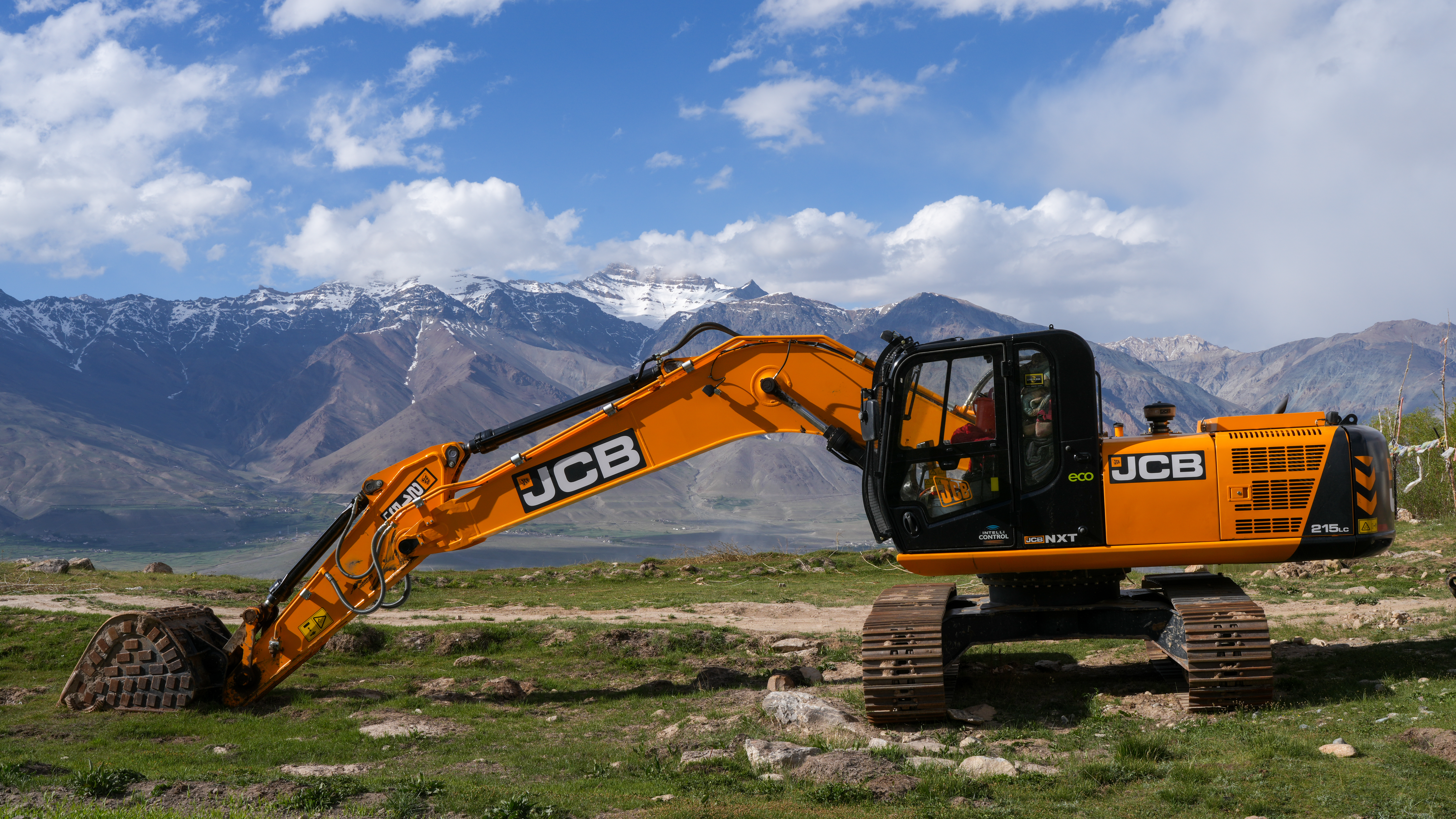
JS215LC tracked excavator in the Himalayas (elev. 3,770 m (12,370 ft))

As the company grew, it started to produce self-propelled machinery, most notably the backhoe loader. As of 2026 the company produces a wide range of agricultural and construction machinery including tracked and wheeled hydraulic excavators, telescopic handlers, wheeled loading shovels, compaction rollers, articulated dump trucks and aerial work platforms.

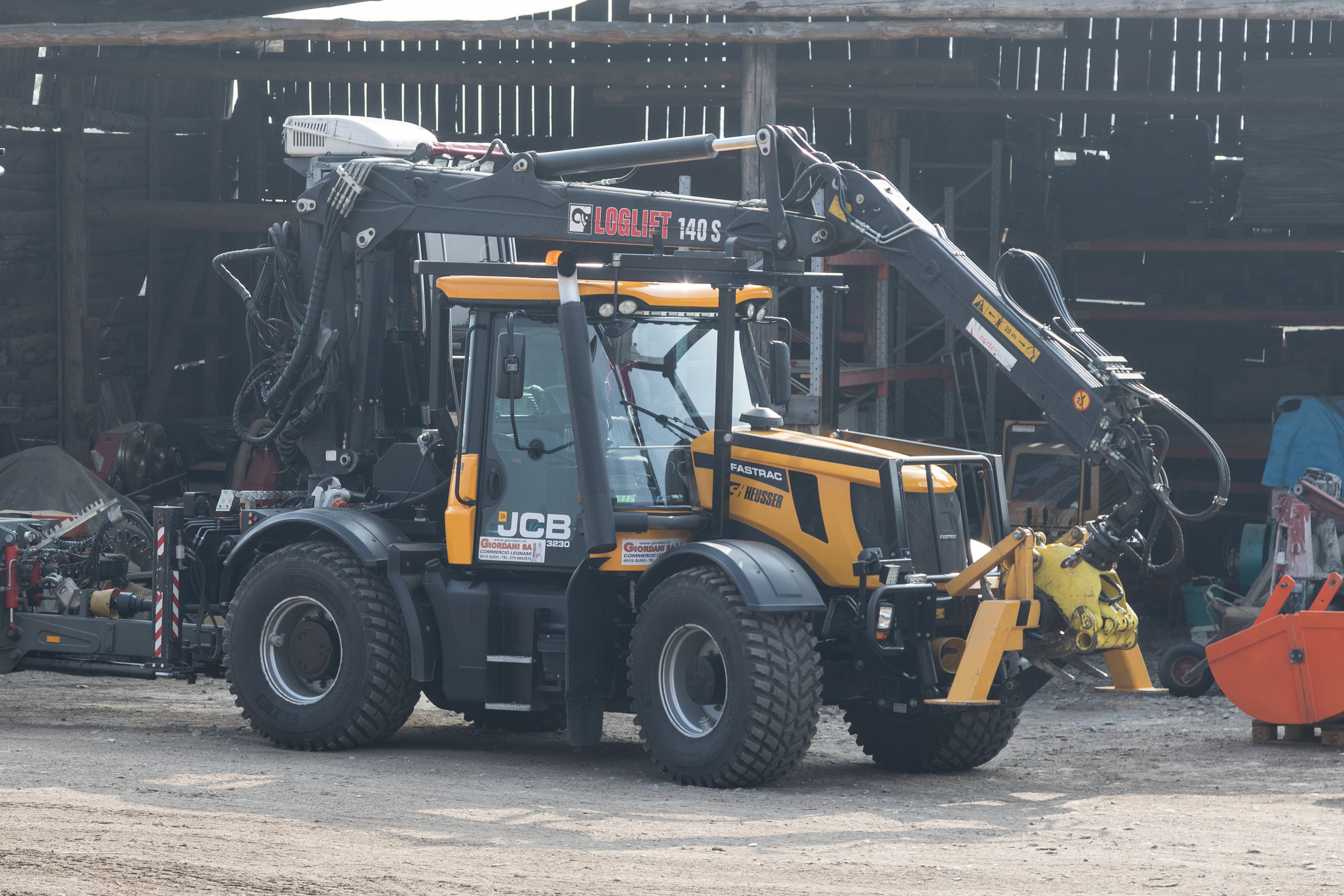
JCB Fastrac 3230

The JCB Fastrac range of tractors entered production in 1990. It was notable for featuring full suspension, making it capable of driving at speeds of up to 75 km/h (40 mph) on roads. This was increasingly important to farmers as mechanisation saw larger estates farmed by fewer people, with crops and implements hauled longer distances between farmsteads and remote fields.

The firm offers a range of modified machines for military engineering applications, as well as the purpose-designed JCB HMEE.

JCB licenses a range of rugged feature phones and smartphones designed for construction sites. The design and marketing contract was awarded to Data Select in 2010, which then lost the exclusive rights in 2013.

JCB make a hydrogen combustion engine which aims to be cost effective by reusing parts from the company's Dieselmax engines. By January 2025, the engines had been approved for commercial sale in many parts of Europe.

JCB Insurance Services is a fully owned subsidiary of JCB that provides insurance for customers with funding from another fully owned subsidiary, JCB Finance.

== Land Speed Records ==
=== JCB GT ===
The JCB GT is a series of dragsters developed as a marketing tool for display at automotive events and supporting displays by the Dancing Diggers. The first GT was built in 1988. Superficially resembling the company's backhoe loaders, the GT features an aluminium chassis; loader and backhoe arm, with a fibreglass exterior shell. In 2014 it was recognised as the world's fastest backhoe by Guinness World Records after achieving 72.58 mph (116.81 km/h) at the Supercheap Auto Bathurst 1000 in Australia.

=== JCB Dieselmax ===
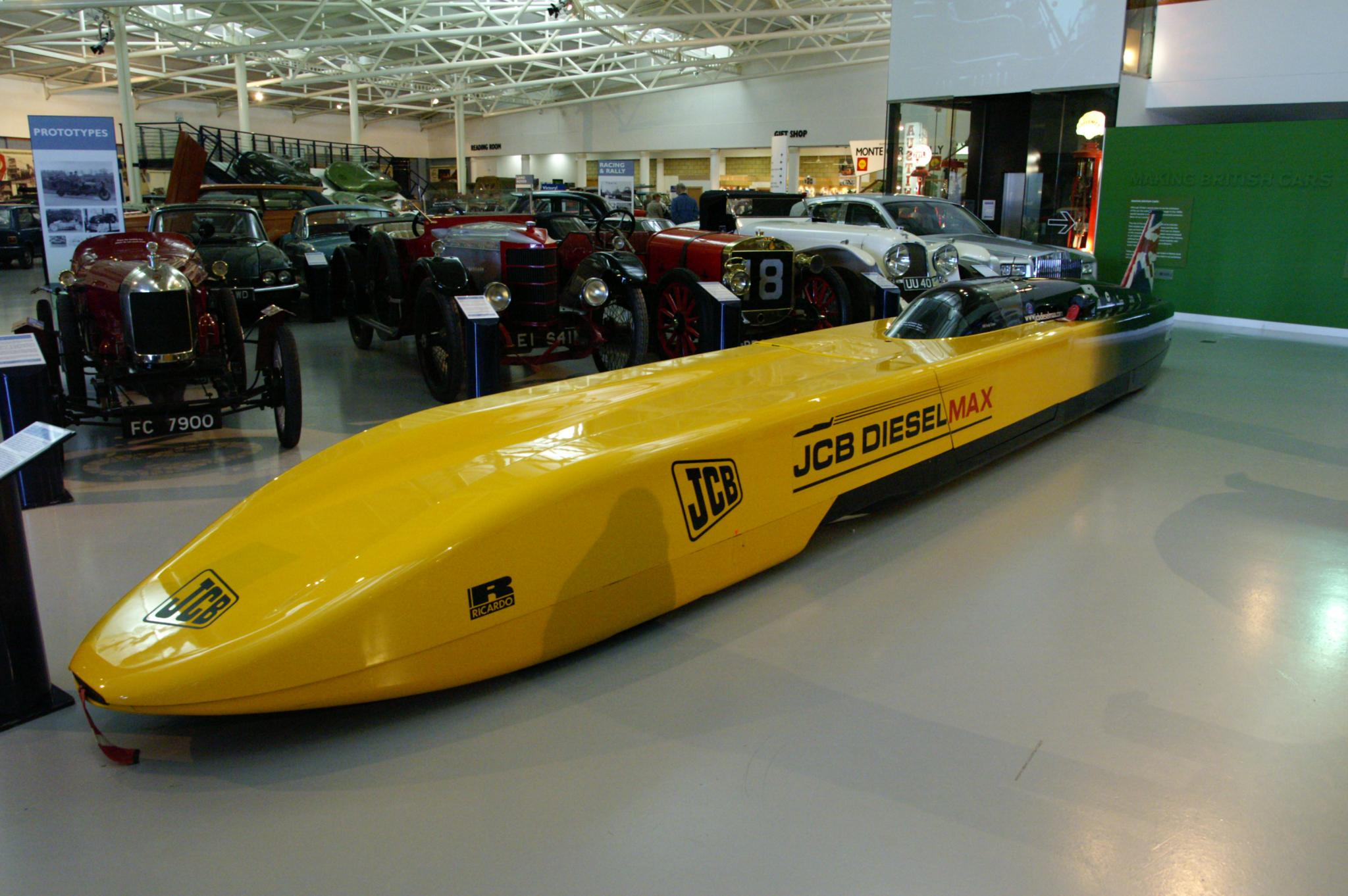
JCB Dieselmax on display at the Heritage Motor Centre

In April 2006, JCB announced that they were developing a diesel-powered land speed record vehicle known as the 'JCB Dieselmax'. The car is powered by two modified JCB 444 diesel power plants using a two-stage turbocharger to generate 750 bhp (560 kW), one engine driving the front wheels and the other the rear wheels.

On 22 August 2006, the Dieselmax, driven by Andy Green, broke the diesel engine land speed record, attaining a speed of 328.767 mph (529.099 km/h). The following day, the record was again broken, this time with a speed of 350.092 mph (563.418 km/h).

=== JCB Hydromax ===
In May 2026, JCB announced plans to try to set a new land speed record using a car powered by hydrogen. JCB has been developing hydrogen engines to reduce emissions. Called the Hydromax, the car has two four-cylinder engines, totalling 800 hp (600,000 W). In order to reduce the car's height, to improve acceleration, the engines are slanted and the car is more aerodynamic and lighter than the Dieselmax.

On 11 August 2026, Green drove the car on the Bonneville Salt Flats, successfully setting a new land speed record for hydrogen vehicles of 653.9 km/h (406.3 mph).

=== Fastrac ===
JCB created the fastest tractor in the world in 2019, with it reaching 135.191 mph.

== Political donations ==
Anthony Bamford donated £100,000 to Vote Leave, the pro-Brexit group, in 2016, and wrote to JCB's 6,500 staff explaining why he supported the UK leaving the EU.

In 2017, a Reuters study of JCB group accounts found that between 2001 and 2013, JCB paid £577M to JCB Research, an unlimited company that does not have to file public accounts, who have made significant donations to the Conservative Party. Between 2007 and 2017, JCB and Bamford entities donated £8.1m in cash or kind to the party. Between 2019 and 2021 JCB donated a further £2.5m. In 2025 it was reported that JCB were donating to the Conservatives and Reform.

== Controversies and criticism ==
=== Violation of EU antitrust law ===
JCB was fined €39.6M in December 2000 by the European Commission for violating European Union antitrust law. The fine related to the company creating barriers within the single market and on occasions fixing retail prices. JCB appealed the decision, with the European Court of First Instance upholding parts of the appeal and reducing the fine by 25%. JCB appealed to the European Court of Justice but this was rejected in 2006, with the court increasing the reduced fine by €864,000.

=== Involvement in Israeli settlements ===
On 12 February 2020, the United Nations published a database of business enterprises conducting activities related to Israeli settlements. JCB was included due to "the supply of equipment and materials facilitating the construction and the expansion of settlements and the wall, and associated infrastructures". The international community considers the settlements to be in violation of international law. In October 2020, the British government investigated a complaint submitted by charity Lawyers for Palestinian Human Rights that JCB's sale of equipment to Israel did not comply with human rights guidelines set by the Organisation for Economic Co-operation and Development. JCB said it had no “legal ownership” of its machinery once sold to Comasco, its sole distributor of JCB equipment in Israel. The complaint was in part upheld.

=== Tax havens ===
Ethical Consumer researched JCB in support of the launch of Palestine Action and found that JCB Service, the main JCB holding company, is owned by Dutch company Transmissions and Engineering Netherlands BV. JCB has subsidiaries in jurisdictions considered to be tax havens, in Singapore, the Netherlands, Hong Kong, Delaware and Switzerland.

=== Covid loan ===
JCB received a £600M Covid Corporate Financing Facility loan in 2020, despite its holding company being in the Netherlands and having reported a record £447M profit in the previous year. Its chief executive Graeme Macdonald said: “Although not a public company, we are eligible for CCF because of our contribution to the UK economy.”

== Media gallery ==
JCB at EXCON 2025, BIEC
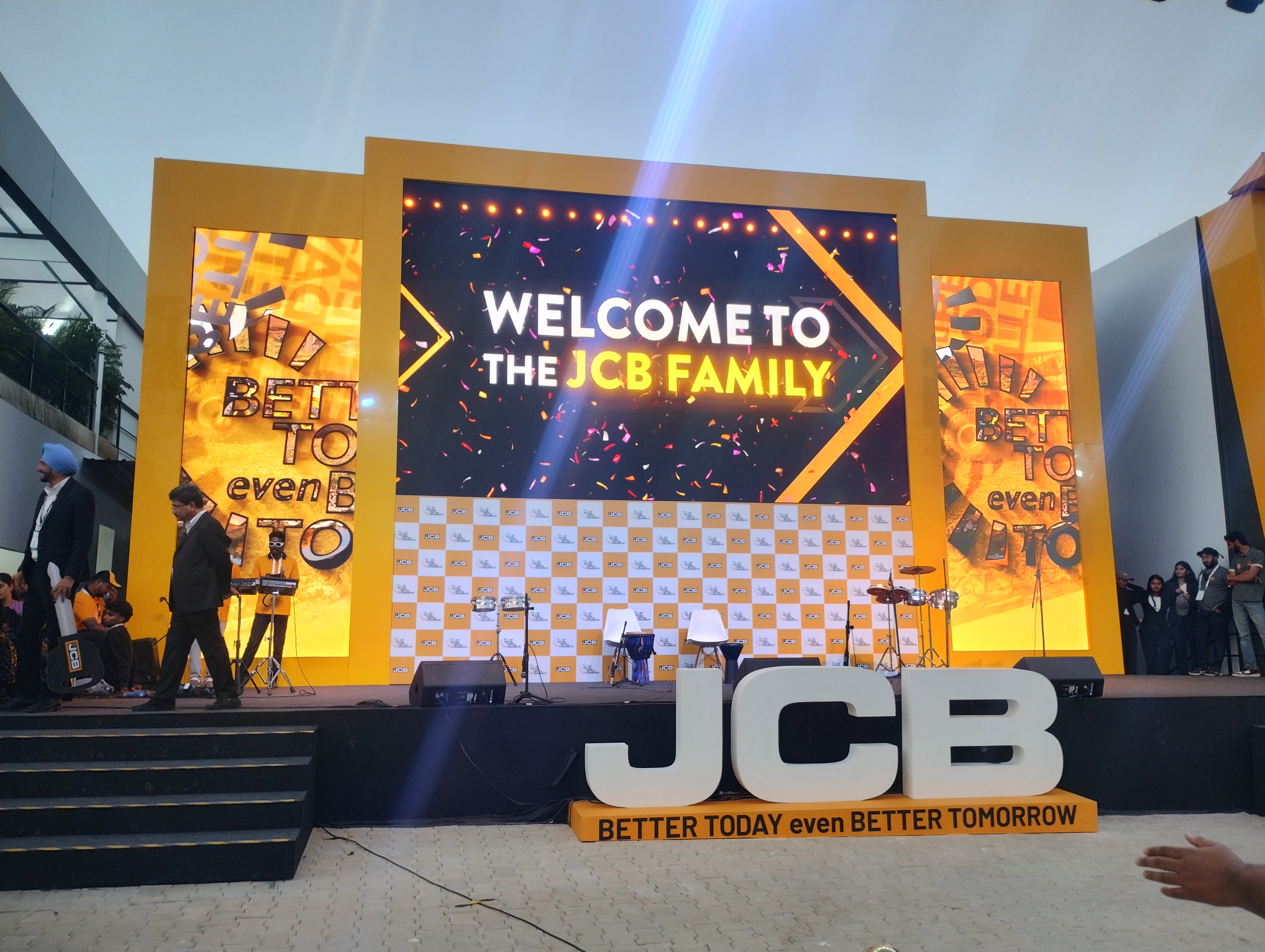

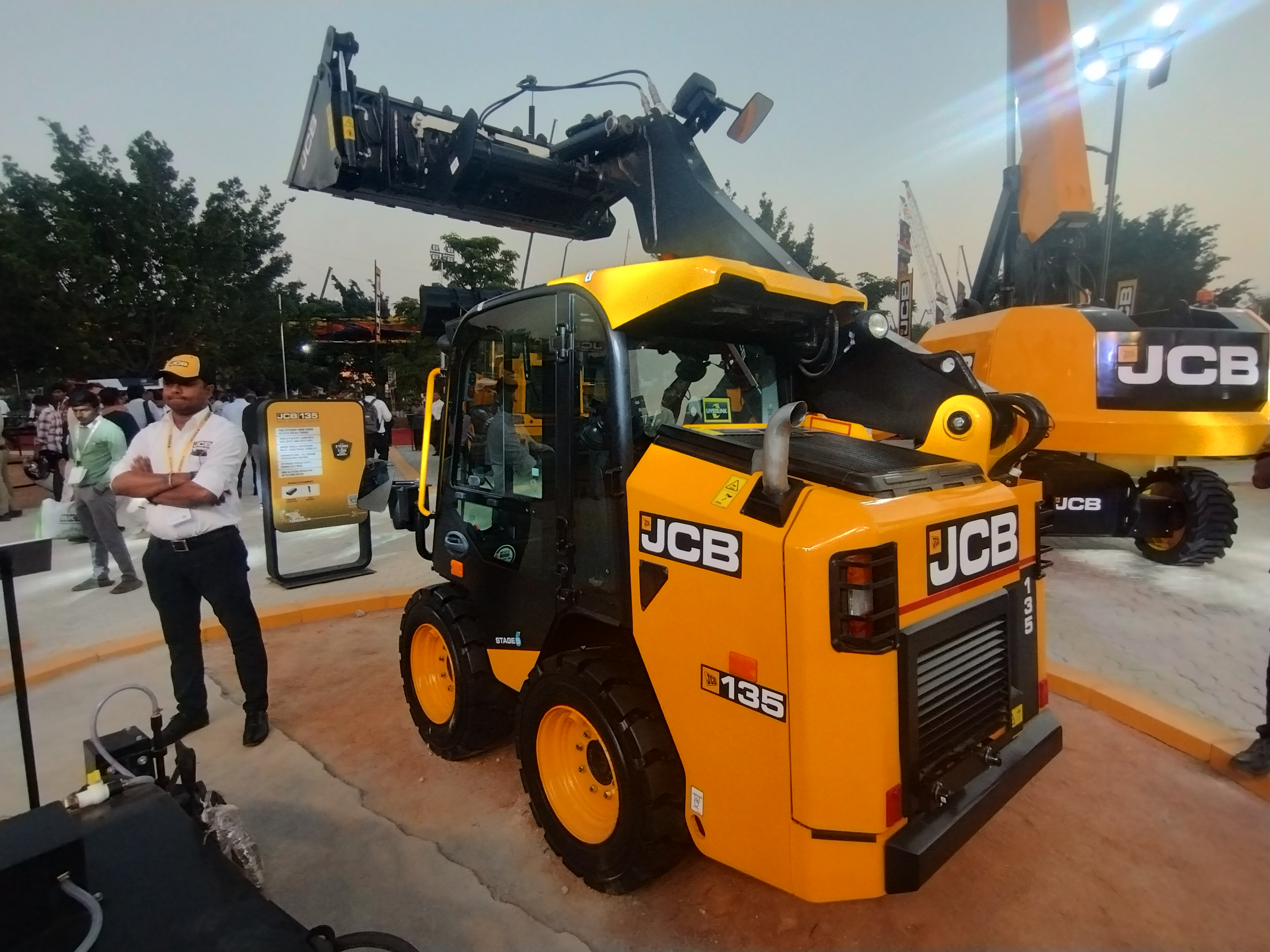

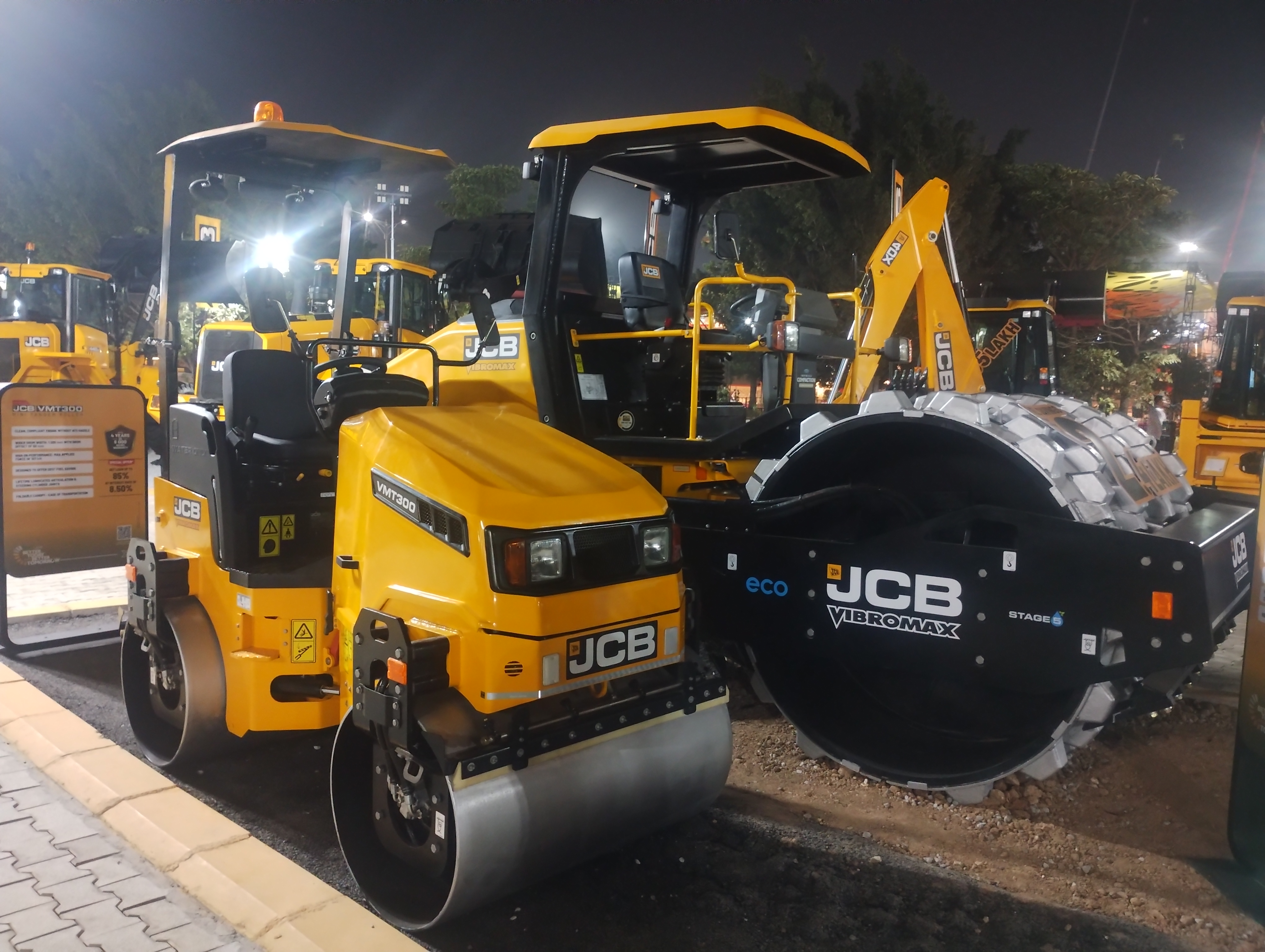

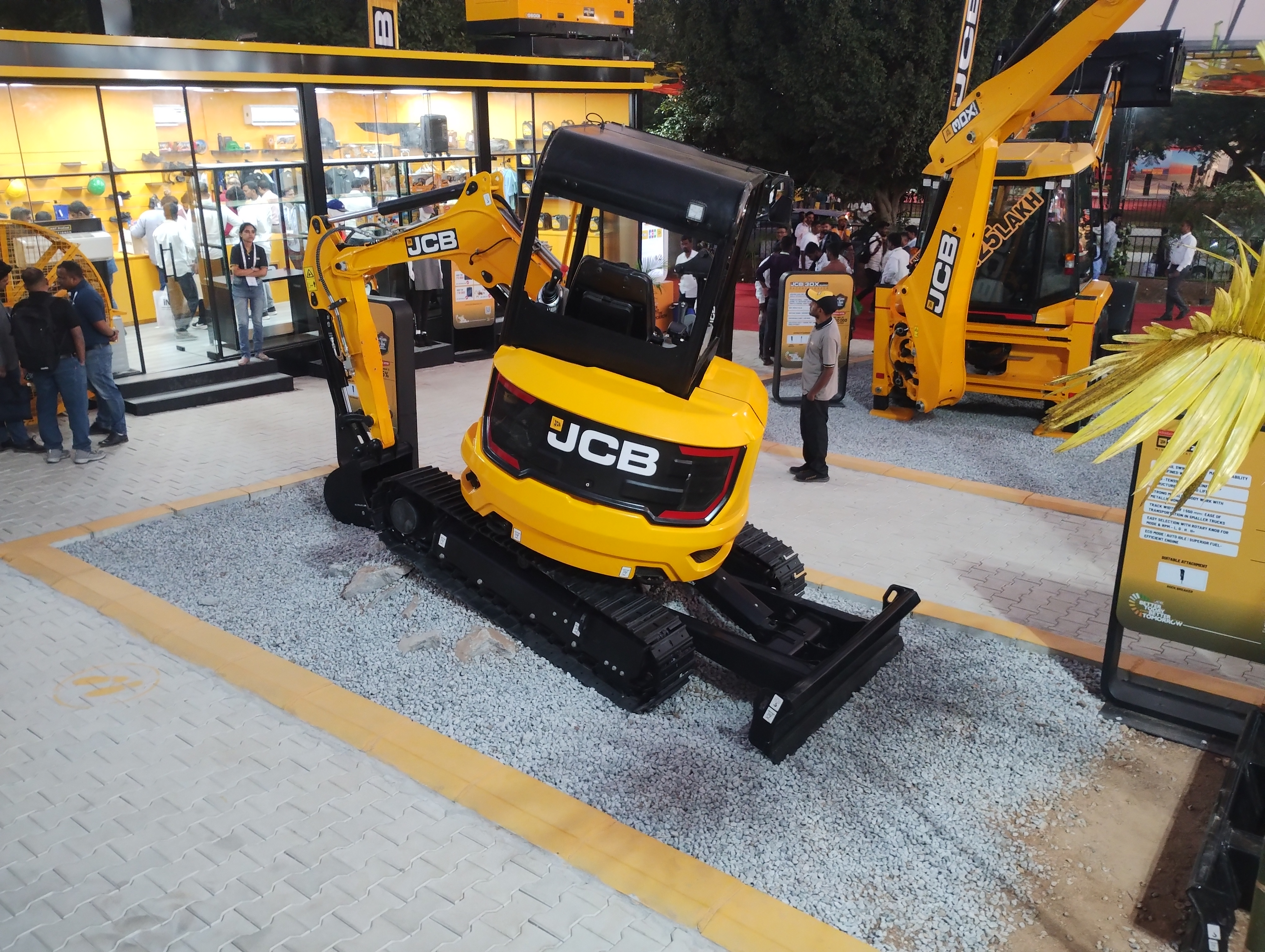

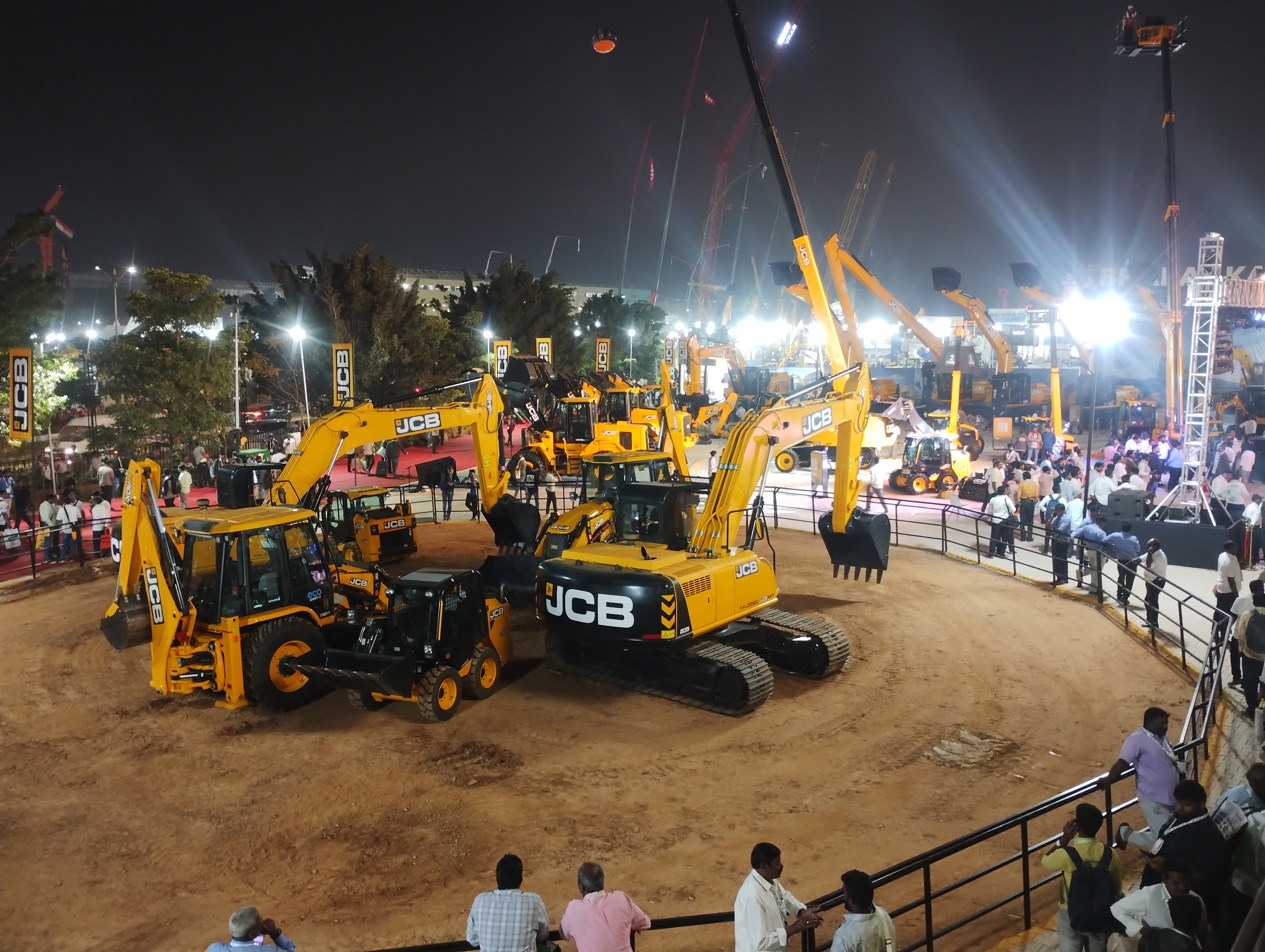
JCB merchandise at EXCON 2025, BIEC
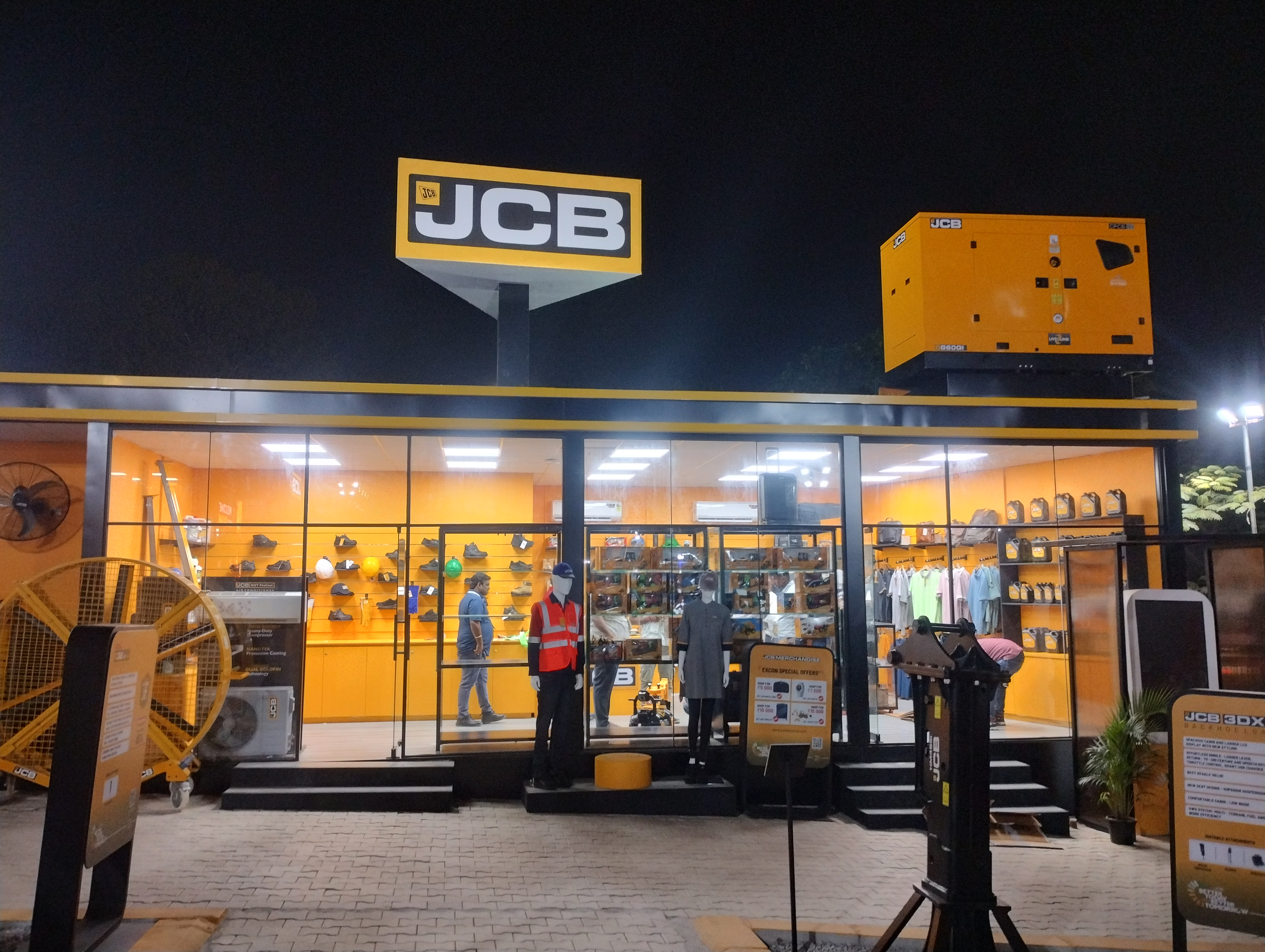

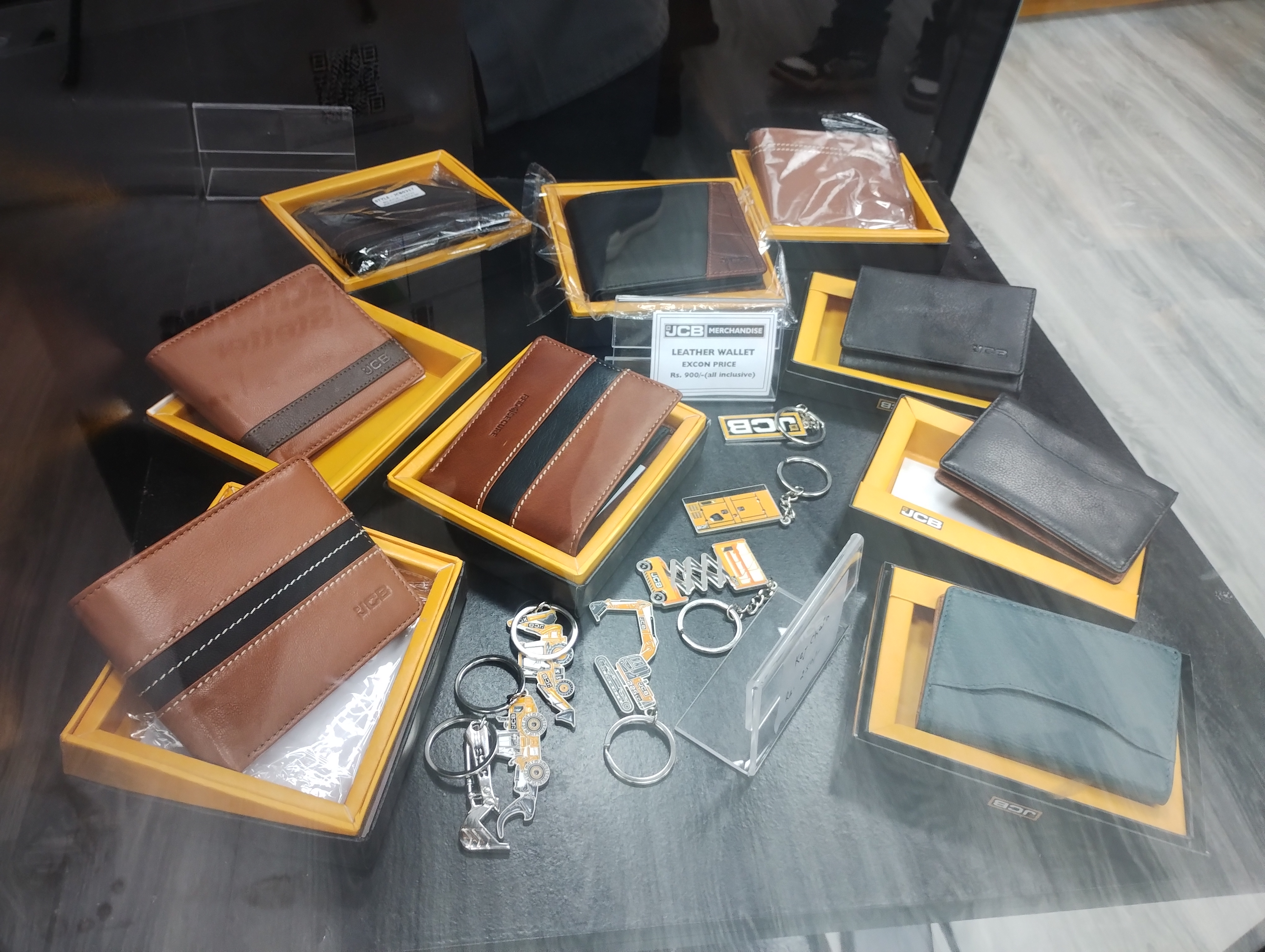

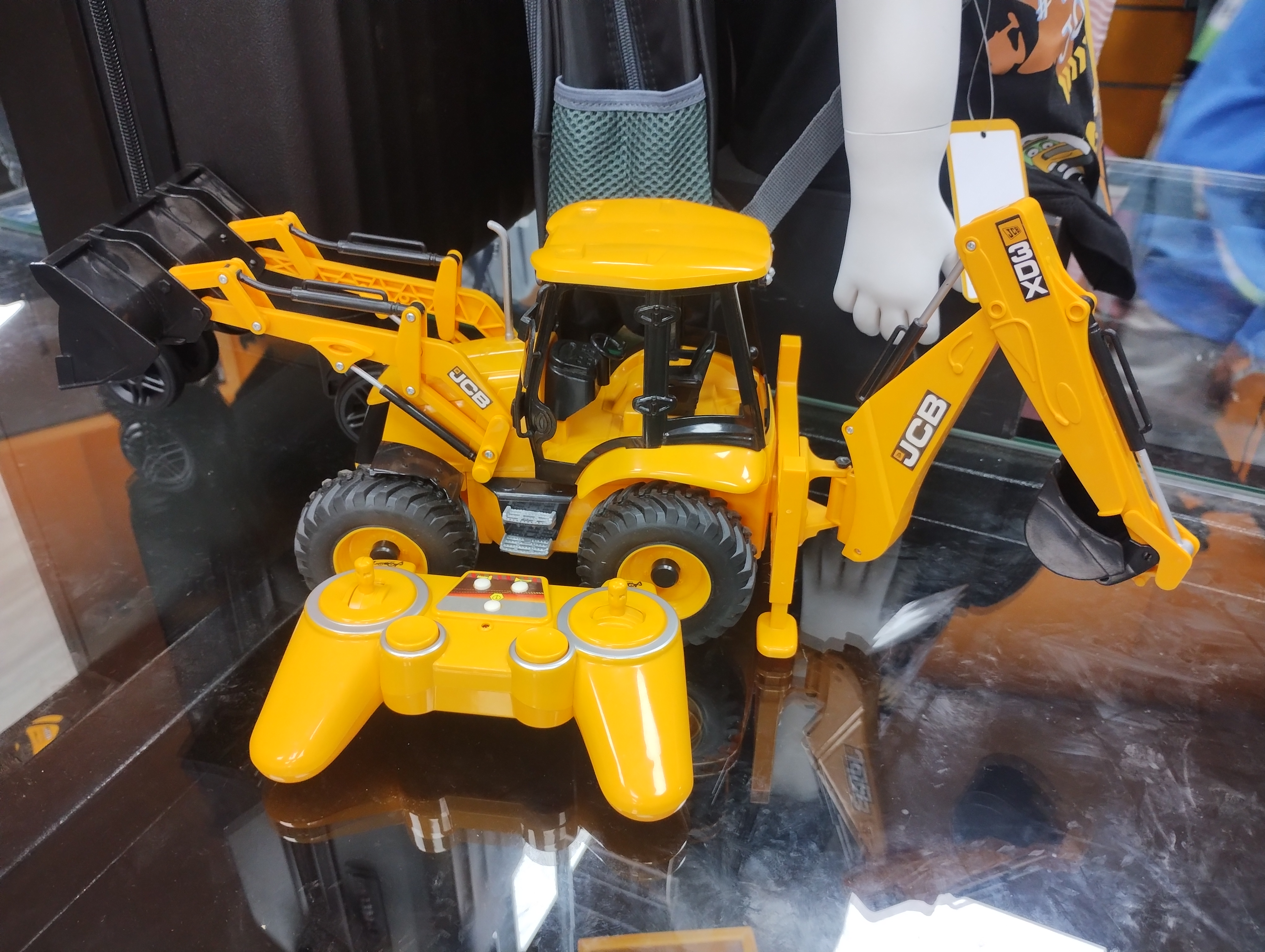

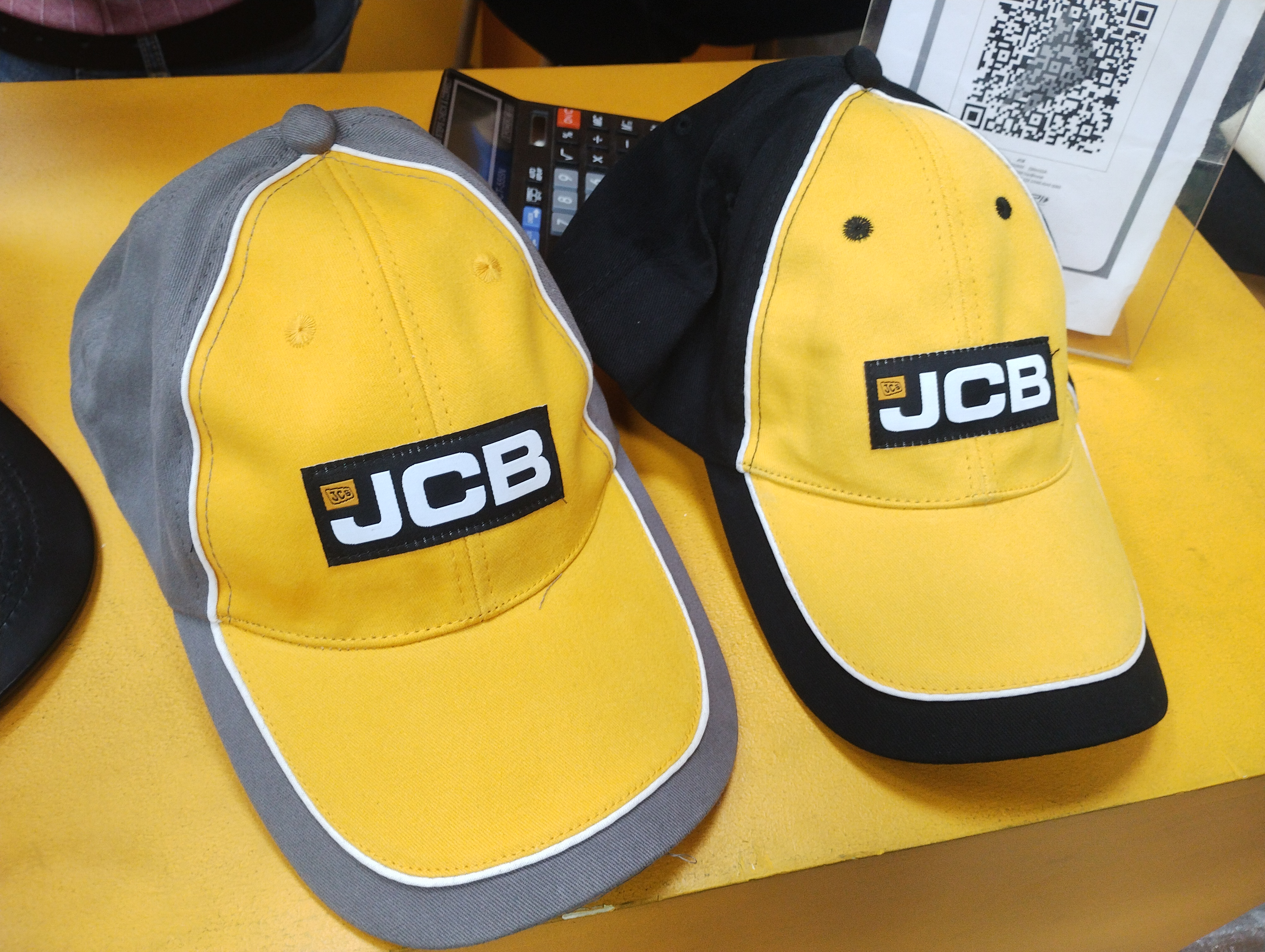

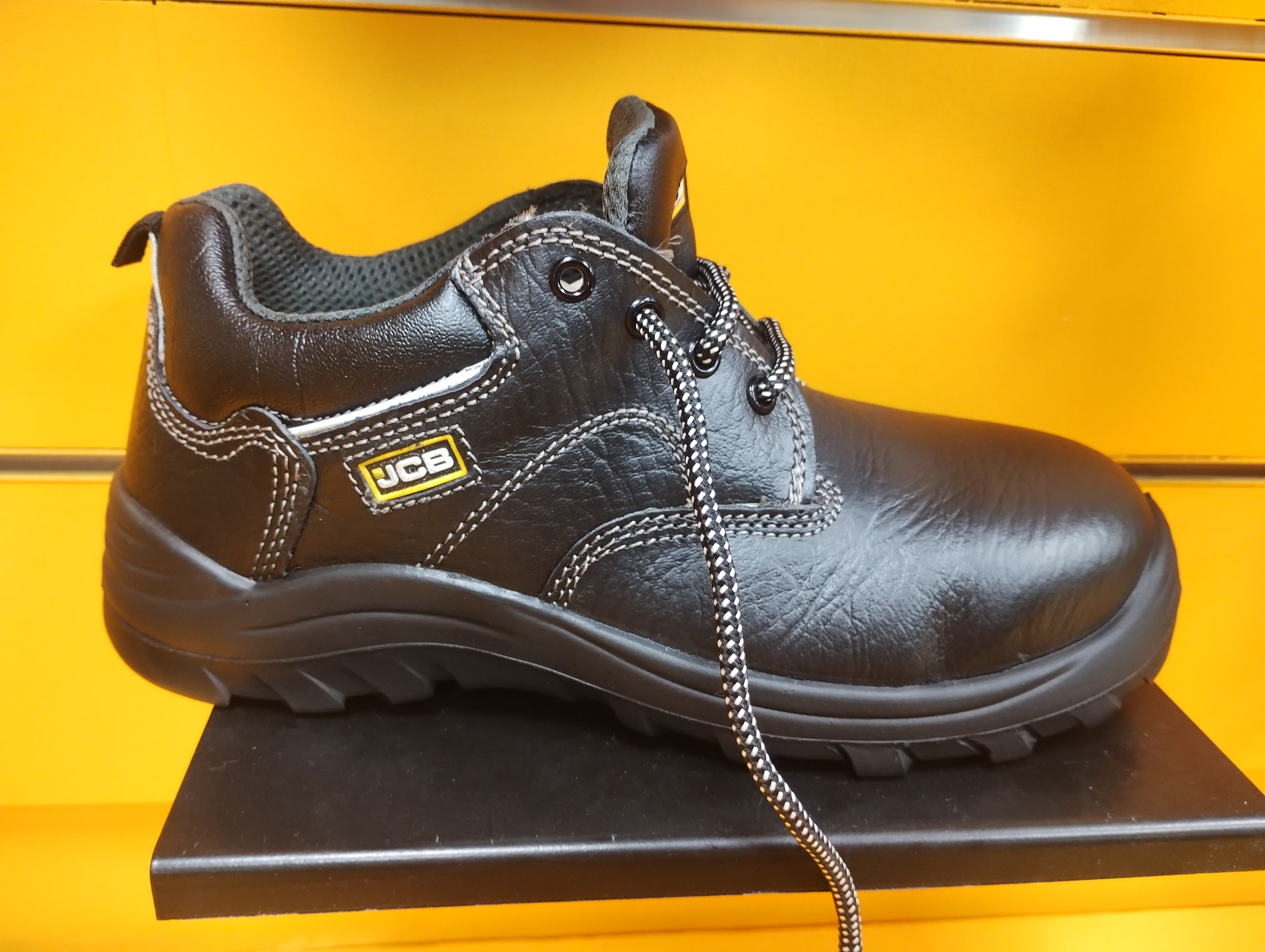
