= List of Derbyshire County Cricket Club grounds =

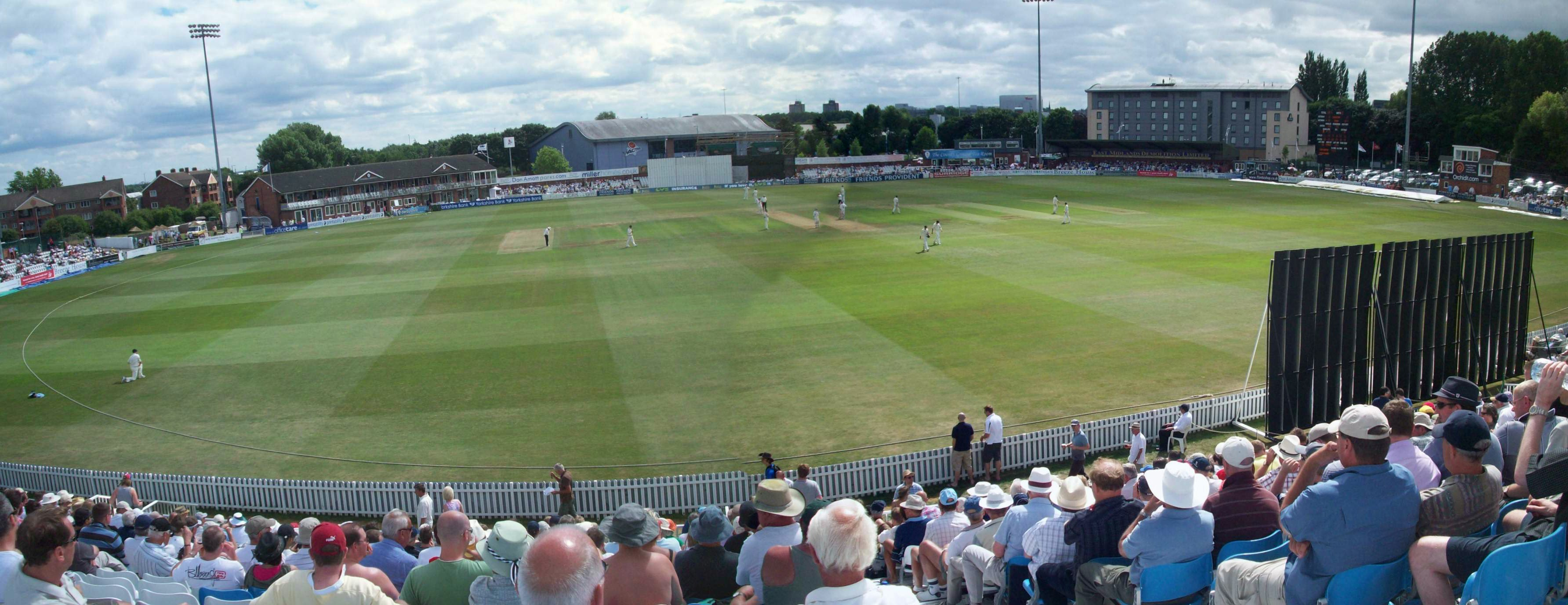
The County Ground in Derby was first used in 1871 and has staged the vast majority of Derbyshire's games.

Derbyshire County Cricket Club is one of the 18 member clubs of the English County Championship, representing the historic county of Derbyshire. The club was established on 4 November 1870 and has competed in first-class cricket since 1871, List A cricket since 1963 and Twenty20 cricket since 2003.^{[A]} Unlike most professional sports, in which a team usually has a single fixed home ground, county cricket clubs have traditionally used different grounds in various towns and cities within the county for home matches, although the use of minor "out grounds" has diminished since the 1980s. The Derbyshire team have played first class, List A, or Twenty20 home matches at twenty-five different grounds. This includes grounds in Burton upon Trent, Knypersley, Leek, Cheadle and Checkley, all of which are not actually located in Derbyshire, but in the adjoining county of Staffordshire.

The county's debut home game in first-class cricket was played at the County Ground in Derby against Lancashire. The venue has also been known as the Racecourse Ground, as it had previously been used for horse racing, and also served as the original home ground of Derby County Football Club, which was formed as an offshoot of the cricket club in 1884. The County Ground has remained the cricket club's primary ground, hosting the majority of home matches, and also played host to the club's first home fixture in Twenty20 cricket against Nottinghamshire in 2003. Queen's Park in Chesterfield, however, staged the club's first home game in List A cricket against Essex in 1964. Queen's Park was first used by the county in 1898 and has continued to be a regular venue for Derbyshire matches, staging over 400 first-class games.

Between the Second World War and 2019, the county only used four new venues for first-class matches. In the late 1940s Abbeydale Park in Dore, a suburb of Sheffield, hosted two matches. Dore had been part of Derbyshire until 1934 but due to boundary changes was actually in the county of Yorkshire by the time Derbyshire played there, and the ground has subsequently hosted Yorkshire CCC home matches. Derbyshire played two first-class matches at the Bass Worthington Ground in Burton upon Trent in the 1970s and one at the Town Ground in Heanor in 1987. Several other grounds have been used for matches in the shorter forms of cricket since the 1980s, including Highfield in Leek. In 2020, a number of designated home games were played at the opponents' grounds during the 2020 COVID-19 pandemic, as the County Ground was being used as an ECB biosecure training camp for the touring Pakistan team.

== Grounds ==
Below is a complete list of grounds used by Derbyshire County Cricket Club for first-class, List A and Twenty20 matches. Statistics are complete through to the end of the 2020 season. Only matches played by Derbyshire CCC at the grounds are recorded in the table. Matches abandoned without any play occurring are not included.

Name	Location	First-class			List A			Twenty20		
Name	Location	First	Last	Matches	First	Last	Matches	First	Last	Matches
County Ground	Derby	17 August 1871 v Lancashire	14 September 2020 v Middlesex	793	18 May 1969 v Essex	23 June 2019 v Australia A	334	19 June 2003 v Nottinghamshire	23 August 2019 v Northamptonshire	75
The Recreation Ground	Wirksworth	13 July 1874 v Kent	no other matches to date	1	–	–	0	–	–	0
Saltergate	Chesterfield	3 August 1874 v Lancashire	30 August 1875 v United North of England Eleven	2	–	–	0	–	–	0
Recreation Ground	Long Eaton	7 July 1887 v Lancashire	no other matches to date	1	–	–	0	–	–	0
Queen's Park	Chesterfield	30 June 1898 v Surrey	29 June 2025<b lancashire]]	406	21 May 1966 v Essex	12 June 2016 v Yorkshire	82	15 June 2008 v Yorkshire	20 July 2019 v Yorkshire	13
North Road	Glossop	13 July 1899 v Lancashire	12 May 1910 v Lancashire	14	–	–	0	–	–	0
Miners Welfare Ground	Blackwell	21 June 1909 v Hampshire	21 June 1913 v Northamptonshire	7	–	–	0	–	–	0
The Town Ground	Burton upon Trent	7 August 1914 v Leicestershire	2 June 1937 v Lancashire	13	–	–	0	–	–	0
The Park	Buxton	20 June 1923 v West Indians	9 August 1986 v Lancashire	45	17 August 1969 v Somerset	10 August 1986 v Lancashire	9	–	–	0
Rutland Recreation Ground	Ilkeston	25 July 1925 v Nottinghamshire	26 May 1994 v Nottinghamshire	93	10 June 1970 v Hampshire	29 May 1994 v Nottinghamshire	16	–	–	0
Ind Coope Ground	Burton upon Trent	18 June 1938 v Gloucestershire	2 July 1980 v Leicestershire	38	6 July 1969 v Gloucestershire	5 September 1976 v Worcestershire	5	–	–	0
Abbeydale Park	Sheffield	20 July 1946 v Sussex	5 July 1947 v Kent	2	–	–	0	–	–	0
Bass Worthington Ground	Burton upon Trent	28 June 1975 v Oxford University	23 June 1976 v Cambridge University	2	–	–	0	–	–	0
Trent College Ground	Long Eaton	–	–	0	6 July 1975 v Kent	1 July 1979 v Northamptonshire	5	–	–	0
Station Road	Darley Dale	–	–	0	7 September 1975 v Hampshire	no other matches to date	1	–	–	0
Town Ground	Heanor	4 July 1987 v Hampshire	no other matches to date	1	11 July 1976 v Somerset	3 July 1989 v Glamorgan	8^{[B]}	–	–	0
Tunstall Road	Knypersley	–	–	0	7 July 1985 v Worcestershire	15 July 1990 v Leicestershire	3	–	–	0
Highfield	Leek	–	–	0	18 May 1986 v Warwickshire	9 June 2013 v Essex	5	26 June 2011 v Warwickshire	no other matches to date	1
Tean Road Sports Ground	Cheadle	–	–	0	12 July 1987 v Glamorgan	no other matches to date	1^{[C]}	–	–	0
Repton School Ground	Repton	–	–	0	3 July 1988 v Middlesex	no other matches to date	1	–	–	0
Four Trees	Checkley	–	–	0	18 August 1991 v Glamorgan	no other matches to date	1	–	–	0
Trent Bridge^{[D]}	Nottingham	1 August 2020 v Nottinghamshire	no other matches to date	1	–	–	0	13 September 2020 v Nottinghamshire	no other matches to date	1
Riverside Ground^{[D]}	Chester-le-Street	22 August 2020 v Durham	no other matches to date	1	–	–	0	–	–	0
Headingley Cricket Ground^{[D]}	Leeds	–	–	0	–	–	0	31 August 2020 v Lancashire	20 September 2020 v Yorkshire	2

== Notes ==
A. First-class cricket matches are designed to be contested over multiple days, with each team permitted two innings with no limit to the number of overs in an innings. List A matches are intended to be completed in a single day and restrict each team to a single innings of between 40 and 60 overs, depending on the specific competition. Twenty20 matches restrict each team to a single innings of 20 overs.

B. The Derbyshire Cricket Board played one List A match at the Town Ground in 2000. The Derbyshire Cricket Board is a separate organisation from Derbyshire County Cricket Club and its matches are not included in the totals.

C. Minor Counties North played one List A match at Tean Road in 1973. The match was against Derbyshire, but Minor Counties North were officially the home team. Only the List A match played at the ground by Derbyshire in which they were the home team is recorded in the table.

D. Derbyshire played a number of designated home games at opponents' grounds in 2020 due to the COVID-19 pandemic, as their home ground was being used for international matches.
