= List of Staffordshire County Cricket Club grounds =

Staffordshire County Cricket Club was established on 24 November 1871. It has since played minor counties cricket from 1895 and played List A cricket from 1971 to 2005, using a different number of home grounds during that time. Their first home minor counties fixture in 1895 was against Northamptonshire at the County Ground, Stoke-on-Trent, while their first home List A match came 76 years later against Glamorgan in the 1971 Gillette Cup at Trentham Road, Stoke-on-Trent.

The 38 grounds that Staffordshire have used for home matches since 1895 are listed below, with statistics complete through to the end of the 2014 season.

== Grounds ==
=== List A ===
Below is a complete list of grounds used by Staffordshire County Cricket Club when it was permitted to play List A matches. These grounds have also held Minor Counties Championship and MCCA Knockout Trophy matches.

Name	Location	First	Last	Matches	First	Last	Matches	First	Last	Matches	Refs
Name	Location	List A			Minor Counties Championship			MCCA Trophy			Refs
Gorway Ground	Walsall	only match: 2 May 2000 v Somerset Cricket Board		1	22 July 1912 v Durham	19 August 2007 v Norfolk	27	2 June 1991 v Oxfordshire	24 May 1998 v Oxfordshire	5	(Note: A combined Minor Counties cricket team played one List A matches here against Warwickshire in the 1986 Benson & Hedges Cup, and Lancashire in the 1997 Benson & Hedges Cup. Only the List A match played at the ground by Staffordshire is recorded in the table.)
Highfield	Leek	only match: 4 May 2005 v Surrey		1	5 July 1920 v Durham	20 August 2006 v Cambridgeshire	23	12 June 2005 v Hertfordshire	15 July 2012 v Wiltshire	12	(Note: Derbyshire played five List A matches here between 1986–2013, while a combined Minor Counties team played two List A matches here in the 1995 Benson & Hedges Cup. Only the List A match played at the ground by Staffordshire is recorded in the table. Derbyshire have also played one Twenty20 match here against Warwickshire in the 2011 Friends Life t20.)
Knutton Road	Wolstanton	only match: 1 May 2001 v Worcestershire Cricket Board		1	2 August 1920 v Cheshire	8 August 1966 v Lancashire Second XI	45	6 June 1999 v Leicestershire Cricket Board	20 June 2004 v Northumberland	5	
Lichfield Road	Stone	30 June 1973 v Dorset	5 May 2004 v Lancashire	12	28 July 1948 v Buckinghamshire	15 August 2010 v Norfolk	44	22 May 1983 v Bedfordshire	4 May 2014 v Oxfordshire	3	(Note: A combined Minor Counties cricket team played one List A match here against Lancashire in the 1992 Benson & Hedges Cup. Only the List A matches played at the ground by Staffordshire are recorded in the table.)
Trentham Road	Stoke-on-Trent	15 May 1971 v Glamorgan	25 June 1975 v Leicestershire	2	18 August 1954 v Northumberland	3 August 2014 v Bedfordshire	42	2 June 1985 v Buckinghamshire	17 June 2012 v Suffolk	8	(Note: A combined Minor Counties cricket team played four first-class matches here against touring international sides between 1959–1972. Minor Counties North played one List A match here against Lancashire in the 1975 Benson & Hedges Cup, while Minor Counties East also played one List A match here against Northamptonshire in the 1976 Benson & Hedges Cup. Only the List A matches played at the ground by Staffordshire are recorded in the table.)
Ind Coope Ground	Burton-upon-Trent	24 June 1987 v Warwickshire	22 June 1988 v Surrey	2	2 June 1988 v Hertfordshire	19 June 1991 v Cambridgeshire	4	–	–	0	(Note: Derbyshire played 38 first-class matches here 1938–1980. Derbyshire played five List A matches here between 1969–1976. Only the List A matches played at the ground by Staffordshire are recorded in the table.)

=== Minor Counties ===
Below is a complete list of grounds used by Staffordshire County Cricket Club in Minor Counties Championship and MCCA Knockout Trophy matches.

Name	Location	First	Last	Matches	First	Last	Matches	Refs
Name	Location	Minor Counties Championship			MCCA Trophy			Refs
County Ground	Stoke-on-Trent	3 June 1895 v Northamptonshire	17 August 1936 v Durham	77	–	–	0	(Note: Five first-class matches were played here. An England XI played the touring Australians in 1886 and 1886, a Staffordshire XI played the Australians in 1890, while a combined Minor Counties cricket team later played the touring South Africans in 1912 and 1929.)
Aston Lower Grounds	Birmingham	only match: 28 June 1897 v Northamptonshire		1	–	–	0	(Note: Aston Lower Grounds were located in the adjacent county of Warwickshire. Two first-class matches were played here when a London United Eleven played a United North of England Eleven in 1879, and an England XI played the touring Australians in 1884.)
The Chuckery	Walsall	28 May 1900 v Yorkshire Second XI	20 August 1902 v Durham	3	–	–	0	
Danescourt	Wolverhampton	25 June 1900 v Northumberland	4 July 1995 v Northumberland	35	–	–	0	
Oldfields Ground	Uttoxeter	21 August 1905 v Bedfordshire	10 August 1970 v Durham	21	–	–	0	(Note: J Bamford's XI played three first-class matches here between 1907–1909.)
Haden Hill Park	Haden Hill	23 July 1923 v Norfolk	18 August 2013 v Norfolk	7	only match: 4 June 1983 v Cheshire		1	
Sandwell Park	West Bromwich	15 June 1927 v Lincolnshire	6 July 2014 v Northumberland	8	–	–	0	
Michelin Ground	Stoke-on-Trent	13 June 1928 v Lincolnshire	22 August 1951 v Northumberland	29	–	–	0	(Note: A combined Minor Counties cricket team played one first-class match here against the touring Australians in 1953.)
The Hough	Stafford	27 July 1932 v Cambridgeshire	18 July 1955 v Durham	9	–	–	0	
Greyhound Way	Stoke-on-Trent	only match: 26 July 1937 v Durham		1	–	–	0	
Tunstall Road	Knypersley	12 June 1946 v Yorkshire Second XI	29 August 2014 v Hertfordshire	28	28 June 2009 v Bedfordshire	8 May 2011 v Cheshire	2	(Note: Derbyshire played three List A matches here between 1985–1990.)
Collins Hill	Lichfield	26 August 1946 v Durham	17 July 1978 v Northumberland	3	–	–	0	
Broomfield	Smethwick	29 August 1949 v Durham	23 June 1982 v Shropshire	3	–	–	0	
Newford	Norton le Moors	6 June 1956 v Durham	1 July 1992 v Suffolk	7	only match: 30 June 1991 v Northumberland		1	
Goodyear Ground	Wolverhampton	25 July 1956 v Yorkshire Second XI	15 May 1957 v Shropshire	2	–	–	0	
Boon Hill Road	Bignall End	20 May 1959 v Cheshire	21 June 1990 v Norfolk	8	–	–	0	
Great Chell Cricket Club Ground	Great Chell	10 August 1964 v Lancashire Second XI	3 July 1967 v Norfolk	4	–	–	0	
The Sid Jenkins Ground	Little Stoke	26 May 1965 v Durham	25 June 1973 v Northumberland	4	–	–	0	
Castlecroft Road	Wolverhampton	only match: 15 June 1966 v Durham		1	–	–	0	
Clayton Lane	Newcastle-under-Lyme	4 July 1966 v Norfolk	10 July 1985 v Northumberland	4	–	–	0	
Tean Road Sports Ground	Cheadle	30 June 1969 v Norfolk	22 July 1973 v Cheshire	5	–	–	0	(Note: Minor Counties North played a List A match here against Derbyshire in the 1973 Benson & Hedges Cup, while Derbyshire played a List A match here against Glamorgan in the 1987 Refuge Assurance League.)
Swynnerton Park	Stone	21 June 1972 v Durham	17 July 1974 v Northumberland	4	–	–	0	
St Edward's Hospital Ground	Cheddleton	30 June 1974 v Cheshire	30 June 1976 v Durham	2	–	–	0	
Kent Hills Ground	Audley	3 July 1974 v Lincolnshire	18 July 1979 v Lincolnshire	2	29 April 2009 v Suffolk	23 May 2010 v Shropshire	2	
Bass Worthington Ground	Burton-upon-Trent	27 August 1975 v Durham	29 May 1986 v Hertfordshire	8	–	–	0	(Note: Derbyshire played two first-class matches here in 1975 and 1976 against Oxford University and Cambridge University.)
Deansfield	Brewood	18 July 1977 v Northumberland	24 July 2000 v Hertfordshire	19	–	–	0	
Willow Lane	Meir Heath	28 May 1992 v Suffolk	25 July 1993 v Lincolnshire	2	only match: 16 June 1991 v Shropshire		1	
The Morris Ground	Cannock	12 June 1996 v Norfolk	19 August 2012 v Cambridgeshire	6	–	–	0	
Deer Park	Dunstall	–	–	0	only match: 21 June 1998 v Nottinghamshire Cricket Board		1	(Note: The Derbyshire Cricket Board played one List A match here against Wales Minor Counties in the 1999 NatWest Trophy, as well as playing a single MCCA Knockout Trophy match against Shropshire in 1998. Only the MCCA Knockout Trophy matches played by Staffordshire at the ground are recorded in the table.)
Hints Road	Tamworth	only match: 30 June 2002 v Bedfordshire		1	only match: 20 May 2001 v Derbyshire Cricket Board		1	
Dennis Viollet Avenue	Stoke-on-Trent	26 June 2011 v Hertfordshire	9 June 2013 v Cumberland	3	–	–	0	
Stourbridge Road	Himley	–	–	0	only match: 19 May 2013 v Berkshire		1	
