= Listed buildings in Checkley =

Checkley is a civil parish in the district of Staffordshire Moorlands, Staffordshire, England. It contains 58 listed buildings that are recorded in the National Heritage List for England. Of these, one is listed at Grade I, the highest of the three grades, four are at Grade II*, the middle grade, and the others are at Grade II, the lowest grade. The parish contains the villages of Checkley, Fole, Hollington, Upper Tean, and Lower Tean and the surrounding countryside. Most of the listed buildings are houses and associated structures, cottages, farmhouses and farm buildings. The other listed buildings include churches and related structures, a country house and associated items, bridges, a tape weaving factory, mileposts, and a folly.

== Key ==
Grade	Criteria
I	Buildings of exceptional interest, sometimes considered to be internationally important
II*	Particularly important buildings of more than special interest
II	Buildings of national importance and special interest

== Buildings ==
Name and location	Photograph	Date	Notes	Grade
St Mary's Church; 52.93838°N 1.95989°W		12th century	The church was altered in the 13th and 14th centuries, and largely rebuilt in the 17th century. It is built in yellow sandstone and has lead-covered roofs. The church consists of a nave with a clerestory, north and south aisles, a south porch, a chancel, and a west tower. The tower has five stages, and has buttresses, a blind round-arched west window, a string course with gargoyles, and a plain parapet with small crocketed corner pinnacles. The parapets of the aisles and clerestory are embattled, and the east windows has five lights. The south doorway dates from about 1300, and has three orders of columns.	I
Tean Hall, Upper Tean; 52.95338°N 1.98636°W		1613	The house is in two parts, and both parts have tile roofs. The older part to the right, is timber framed, and has two storeys and an attic, and three bays, the right bay projecting and gabled. The windows are of varying types, and in the left bay is a dated gabled dormer. The left part was added in the early 18th century, and is in Baroque style. It is in red brick with stone dressings on a moulded plinth, with giant pilaster strips, a moulded cornice, and a hipped roof. There are two storeys and an attic, and two bays, the left bay projecting. The windows are sashes with raised keystones, and there are two gabled dormers.	II*
2 Hollington Road, Upper Tean; 52.95331°N 1.98463°W	—	17th century	The house has a timber framed core, it was refronted in the 19th century, and is roughcast on a plinth with a tile roof. There are two storeys and two bays. The central doorway has an ornate gabled porch, and the windows are small-pane casements, those in the upper floor with gablets and wavy bargeboards. On the left side is exposed timber framing.	II
Blythe House; 52.93776°N 2.00268°W	—	17th century	The farmhouse was largely rebuilt in the 18th century and extended in the 19th century. It is in red brick on a 17th-century chamfered sandstone plinth, and has a tile roof with verge parapets on the left. The doorway and the windows, which are casements, have segmental heads. The farmhouse also includes double doors to a dairy with a loft door above, and a stable door. In the left gable end are external steps leading to a loft door.	II
Fole Farmhouse; 52.93409°N 1.93673°W	—	17th century	The farmhouse was extended in the 18th century and refaced in the 19th century. The 17th-century material in the left gable is in stone, and the rest of the farmhouse is in red brick. The roof is tiled and has verge parapets. There are two storeys and an L-shaped plan. The doorway has a moulded surround and a cornice, most of the windows are sashes with wedge lintels, and in the left gable are chamfered mullioned windows.	II
Goldhurst Farmhouse; 52.95202°N 1.95627°W	—	17th century	Most of the farmhouse dates from the late 18th century, and there were later alterations. It is in red brick with a dentilled eaves course, and has a tile roof with coped verge parapets. There are three storeys and five bays. On the front is a gabled porch with a round-headed entrance. The windows in the top floor are casements, in the lower floors they are tripartite sashes with segmental heads, and in the left gable end is a chamfered mullioned window.	II
Hall Green Farmhouse; 52.94674°N 1.98184°W	—	Mid 17th century	The farmhouse, which was altered in the 19th century, is timber framed and mostly roughcast, and has a tile roof. There are two storeys and an attic, a front of three bays, the outer bays gabled, and a later rear wing. The central doorway has a hood, and the windows are casements. In the apices of the gables are small diamond-shaped windows, and the gables on the sides have exposed timber framing.	II
Yard Farm House, Hollington; 52.94668°N 1.91237°W	—	17th century	The farmhouse, which was altered in the 20th century, is in Hollington sandstone and has a tile roof. There are two storeys and three bays. On the front is a gabled porch, and the windows have chamfered mullions, those in the left gable end each with four lights.	II
The Cottage and adjoining unit, Lower Tean; 52.94423°N 1.97942°W	—	1691	A house, later divided into two units, it was altered in the 20th century. The house is in red sandstone, partly rendered, and has a tile roof with verge parapets. There are two storeys and an attic, and three bays. The doorway has a Tudor arched head and an inscribed and dated lintel. The windows are casements, and there are two gabled dormers.	II
Rectory Farmhouse; 52.93640°N 1.95953°W	—	Late 17th or early 18th century	The farmhouse, which was later extended and altered, is in red brick on a moulded stone plinth, with quoins, a floor band, a moulded eaves band, and a tile roof that has a verge parapet on the left with a ball finial on the kneeler. There are two storeys and an attic, a front of five bays, and a lower two-storey extension on the right with a dentilled eaves course and two bays. The doorway has a moulded pediment, the original windows were cross casements, one has been replaced by a sash window, and there is a dormer with a hipped roof.	II
Fole Bridge; 52.93182°N 1.93418°W		Early to mid 18th century	The bridge carries Fole Lane over the River Tean. It is in stone, and consists of a single semicircular arch. The bridge has a parapet band, a plain parapet that is cambered over the span, and at the ends are circular piers.	II
14, 14A and 16 High Street, Upper Tean; 52.95357°N 1.98774°W	—	18th century	Two houses in red brick with tile roofs. Nos. 14 and 14A to the right have two storeys, and four bays, the left bay gabled. There are two doorways and casement windows, all with segmental heads, and in each of the right two bays is a gabled dormer. No. 16 is taller and gabled, with two storeys and an attic and two bays. In the ground floor is a small shop front and a separate doorway to the right, and the windows are casements with moulded raised keystones.	II
37 High Street, Upper Tean; 52.95353°N 1.98565°W	—	Mid 18th century	The house is in painted rendered brick, with a band, and a tile roof with verge parapets. There are two storeys and an attic, and a front of three bays. The windows are casements with segmental heads.	II
Brooklands, Upper Tean; 52.95474°N 1.98789°W	—	Mid 18th century	A house that was extended in the 19th century, it is in red brick, with an eaves cornice and a tile roof. There are two storeys and an attic, a front of two bays, and the extension at the rear has four bays. On the front is a gabled porch, and the windows are casements with raised keystones.	II
Footbridge over River Tean; 52.94414°N 1.98012°W		18th century (possible)	The footbridge over the River Tean consists of solid stone slabs on four stone piers. The piers are chamfered on the angles, and corbelled out at the tops.	II
Manor Farmhouse; 52.93790°N 1.95927°W	—	18th century	A red brick farmhouse with a cogged eaves course and a tile roof. There are two storeys and three bays. The doorway has a moulded surround, and the windows are casements with segmental heads.	II
Mill Farmhouse, Fole; 52.93256°N 1.93447°W	—	Mid 18th century	The farmhouse is in red brick, and has a tile roof with stone coped parapets on corbelled kneelers. There are two storeys and an attic, and two bays. The windows are cross casements, and above the doorway is a blind window; all have wedge lintels.	II
Wall and piers, Rectory Farmhouse; 52.93659°N 1.95949°W	—	18th century	The wall is to the northwest of the farmhouse, and is in red brick with moulded stone coping. The piers are about 2 metres (6 ft 7 in) high, and each pier has stepped-in coping, and an urn finial with festoons and gadrooning.	II
Churchyard wall and gates, St Mary's Church; 52.93816°N 1.96002°W	—	18th century (possible)	The churchyard wall is in stone, and has two entrances. It is ramped up on the north side to piers between which is an overthrow and a gate, both in wrought iron. The south entrance has octagonal piers dating from the 19th century, and between them are wrought iron gates.	II
The Cross Cottage, Hollington; 52.94657°N 1.91273°W		Mid 18th century	The house is in Hollington sandstone and has a tile roof with verge parapets. There are two storeys, and the house is in two parts, each with one bay. The front of the left part is largely obscured by the adjacent building, and it contains casement windows. The right part has three-light mullioned windows, the window in the ground floor with a wedge lintel, and to its left is a round-arched doorway.	II
Stables and Coach House, Heath House; 52.95163°N 1.96123°W		18th century	The stables and coach house were largely rebuilt in the 19th century. They are in red brick with a dentilled eaves course and hipped tile roofs. The buildings form a U-shaped plan open to the south, and contain carriage doors and small-paned casement windows, all with segmental heads. On the north range is a gablet, a clock and a cupola.	II
White Hart, Upper Tean; 52.95377°N 1.98824°W		18th century	The public house is in red brick on a sandstone plinth, with corbelled eaves and a tile roof. There are two storeys and an attic, and front of four bays, the third bay projecting and gabled. The fourth bay is wider, and also gabled. The windows are a mix of sashes and casements, most with wedge lintels, and some with raised keystones.	II
31A and 33 High Street, Upper Tean; 52.95354°N 1.98623°W	—	Late 18th century	A pair of red brick shops, with a tile roof and a verge parapet at the left end. There are three storeys and four bays. In the ground floor are two doorways, each flanked by two shop windows. The upper floors contain casement windows, those in the middle floor with segmental heads.	II
Bank House and Bank Cottage, Lower Tean; 52.94357°N 1.97309°W	—	Late 18th century	A house that was altered in the 19th century, and divided into two units. It is in red brick with an eaves band, and has a tile roof with coped verge parapets on corbelled kneelers. There are two storeys and an attic, and a complex H-shaped plan, consisting of a double parallel range linking to an L-shaped range facing the road. Most of the windows are sashes, there is a semicircular bay window with a conical roof, and hipped dormers, and the range facing the road has segmental-headed casement windows.	II
Church View Cottage; 52.93887°N 1.96016°W	—	Late 18th century	A red brick house with a tile roof, two storeys, and three bays. The doorway has a moulded surround, a frieze, and a hood, and the windows are casements, those in the ground floor with segmental heads.	II
Row of five memorials 52.93815°N 1.95966°W	—	Late 18th century	The memorials are in the churchyard of St Mary's Church. They are all chest tombs in stone, and all have pilasters.	II
Hall Yard Buildings, Upper Tean; 52.95332°N 1.98602°W	—	Late 18th century	A mill, later converted into shops, the building is in red brick with a dentilled eaves course and a tile roof. There are three storeys, and the gable end faces High Street. The buildings contains shop windows, doorways, and casement windows, those in the lower two floors with segmental heads.	II
New Tean Hall Mill, Upper Tean; 52.95346°N 1.98699°W		Late 18th century	The tape weaving factory and warehouse was built by J. & N. Philips, it was extended on a number of occasions, and is constructed in red brick with Welsh slate roofs. Part of the building runs along the south side of High Street. The block to the left is the earliest, it has two storeys, eleven bays, two of which are pedimented and contain a clock. Behind the pediment is a cupola containing a bell, the windows are casements, and the right two bays are angled and contain an elliptical-arched carriage entrance. To the rear at right angles, and added in 1822, is a long wing of four storeys, 27 bays long and five bays wide, and there are later wings at the rear. On High Street, to the right, and built in 1884, is a block with four storeys and eight bays. The middle two bays are flanked by pilasters, and are pedimented with a datestone. The outer bays also have pilasters and each contains a round-headed doorway.	II*
The Rectory; 52.93878°N 1.95975°W	—	Late 18th century	The rectory, which was extended in the 19th century, is in brick with a cogged eaves course and a tile roof. There are two storeys and an attic, the original part has a symmetrical front of three bays, and the extension to the right has one bay and two storeys without an attic. The doorway has a moulded surround, the windows are sashes with segmental heads, and there are three gabled dormers.	II
Yewtree, Lower Tean; 52.94512°N 1.97754°W	—	Late 18th century	The house is in red brick with a floor band, a dentilled eaves band, and a tile roof. There are two storeys, three bays, and a single-storey extension to the right. The doorway, the windows, which are casements, and the blind window above the doorway, have segmental heads.	II
35 High Street, Upper Tean; 52.95350°N 1.98596°W	—	Early 19th century	A house, later a shop, it is in red brick on a stone plinth, with a cornice and a hipped tile roof. There are three storeys and four bays. In the ground floor is a full-length 20th-century shop front with a recessed doorway, and the upper floors contain sash windows with wedge lintels.	II
10–16 Uttoxeter Road, Lower Tean; 52.94537°N 1.97871°W	—	Early 19th century	A house that was later extended and divided, it is in red brick, partly rendered, and has a tile roof. There are two storeys and two blocks, the later block recessed and to the left. The right block has three bays. The windows, which are casements, and the doorway to the right, have wedge lintels. The later block has four bays, three-light windows with segmental heads in the inner bays, and small windows and doorways with segmental heads and fanlights in the outer bays.	II
Hall Green House, Uttoxeter Road; 52.94690°N 1.97992°W	—	Early 19th century	A red brick house with a tile roof, two storeys, two bays, and a lean-to at the rear. The windows are sashes with wedge lintels, and the entrance is in the lean-to.	II
Hey Bridge; 52.94191°N 1.97473°W		Early 19th century	The bridge carries a road over the River Tean, and is in red brick. It consists of two round arches, and has deep stone parapets with round coping that are splayed to ramps.	II
Hollington House; 52.94840°N 1.91393°W	—	Early 19th century	A farmhouse in Hollington sandstone, with a chamfered eaves band, and a tile roof with verge parapets. There are two storeys and an attic, and three bays. The doorway has a fanlight and a flat hood, and the windows are sashes with wedge lintels.	II
Light Oaks Farmhouse; 52.96792°N 1.93572°W	—	Early 19th century	The farmhouse is in red Hollington sandstone, with a moulded and dentilled eaves course, and a tile roof. There are two storeys and an attic, a T-shaped plan, and a front of three bays. The doorway has a fanlight, and the windows are casements.	II
Stables, Lightoaks Farm; 52.96822°N 1.93513°W	—	Early 19th century	The stables are in red Hollington sandstone, with a chamfered eaves band, and a tile roof. There are two storeys and three bays divided by buttresses. The building contains five stable doors, with an opening above each, and two windows. There is an extension at each end.	II
Milepost in front of Hall Yard Buildings; 52.95342°N 1.98595°W		Early 19th century	The milepost is in the south side of High Street, Upper Tean. It is in cast iron, and has a triangular plan, with a sloping top, and a round-headed panel above that. The panel is inscribed with the distances to London and Liverpool, on the sloping top is "CHECKLEY PARISH", and on the sides are the distances to Newcastle and Uttoxeter.	II
Milepost at Green Park; 52.93774°N 1.95310°W		Early 19th century	The milepost is in the south side of the A522 road near Checkley. It is in cast iron, and has a triangular plan, with a sloping top, and a round-headed panel above that. The panel is inscribed with the distances to London and Liverpool, on the sloping top is "CHECKLEY PARISH", and on the sides are the distances to Newcastle and Uttoxeter.	II
Tean Bank Cottage, Lower Tean; 52.94378°N 1.97276°W	—	Early 19th century	The cottage, which was later extended, is in red brick with a tile roof. There are two storeys, two bays, and a single-storey two-bay extension on the left. The doorway and the windows, which are sashes, have wedge lintels.	II
The Cross House, Hollington; 52.94688°N 1.91258°W	—	Early 19th century	The house is in Hollington sandstone, and has a tile roof with verge parapets. There are two storeys, a front of three bays, and a single-bay extension to the right. The doorway has a cornice, and the windows are casements.	II
Walled garden, Heath House; 52.95300°N 1.96108°W	—	Early 19th century (probable)	The garden to the north of the hall has walls of red brick with stone coping. The walls have sides of about 150 metres (490 ft) by 100 metres (330 ft), and there are raised piers at the angles.	II
Woodruff Memorial; 52.94678°N 1.91278°W	—	Early 19th century	The memorial is in the churchyard of St Mary's Church and is to the memory of Thomas Woodruff. It is a pedestal tomb in stone, and has a plinth and a moulded cornice. On the sides are inscriptions.	II
Balustrading, steps, piers and gates, Heath House; 52.95091°N 1.96054°W	—	c. 1830	In front of the orangery is a sunken garden flanked by balustrades and a low wall designed by James Trubshaw. Within the walls are piers surmounted by urns. There are steps between the levels, and at the entrance are cast iron decorative piers, urns, poppyhead rails, and gates.	II
Planting trough to orangery (north), Heath House; 52.95105°N 1.96063°W	—	c. 1830	The planting trough, designed by James Trubshaw, is in stone. It is in the form of a cusped quatrefoil with five circular basins on a low moulded plinth.	II
Planting trough to orangery (south), Heath House; 52.95094°N 1.96038°W	—	c. 1830	The planting trough, designed by James Trubshaw, is in stone. It is in the form of a cusped quatrefoil with five circular basins on a low moulded plinth.	II
North Lodge, Heath House; 52.95371°N 1.96111°W	—	1830–31	The lodge, designed by James Trubshaw, is in sandstone and has a pyramidal slate roof, two storeys, and three bays. The central doorway has Tuscan columns and half-columns, a frieze, and a segmental head. The windows are casements with segmental heads.	II
Northwest Lodge, Heath House; 52.95279°N 1.96856°W		1830–31	The lodge, designed by James Trubshaw, is in sandstone and has a pyramidal slate roof. There is a single storey, a square plan, and front of three bays with a deep central recess flanked by pilasters. The windows are casements, and at the rear is a later lower brick extension.	II
Piers and railings, Northwest Lodge, Heath House; 52.95281°N 1.96868°W	—	1830–31	Designed by James Trubshaw, the railings, which are in wrought iron, enclose the garden in front of the lodge in an arc, and also form a quadrant to the right of the driveway. There are six piers, four flanking the carriage and pedestrian driveways, and two at the ends of the railings. The piers are in stone and have domed cappings.	II
Orangery, wall and sheds, Heath House; 52.95105°N 1.96046°W		1831	The orangery, designed by James Trubshaw, is in yellow sandstone on a plinth, and between the bays are Ionic half-columns, at the angles are pilasters, and above is a deep frieze with lions' heads corbels, a dentilled cornice and a blocking course. In the centre of the cornice is a raised step with a statue of a girl with a dog, and the roof is glazed, hipped and curved. The openings have round heads, moulded imposts, and console keystones, and they contain French casement windows. The entrance is at the rear. The orangery is flanked by screen walls containing panels and ending in piers. At the rear of the walls are lean-to potting sheds with mullioned windows and slate roofs.	II*
31 High Street, Upper Tean; 52.95358°N 1.98645°W		Early to mid 19th century	A house and shop in painted rendered brick, with a sill band, a dentilled cornice, and a tile roof. There are two storeys and two bays. In the left bay is an early 19th-century shop front with a recessed doorway between two small-pane windows, flanked by pilasters, over which is a frieze and a cornice. The windows are sashes with moulded surrounds on brackets.	II
Heath House; 52.95062°N 1.96212°W		1836	A country house in stone on a moulded plinth, with bands, and slate roofs with coped verge parapets and gables, some of which are shaped. The house is in Tudor style, it has two and three storeys, an H-shaped plan, and at the rear is an L-shaped service wing. The entrance front has five bays, the central bay rising to a three-storey tower that has an octagonal parapet with pinnacles, and behind which is a four-storey octagonal stair tower. In the ground floor is a porte-cochère with a Tudor arch, a balustrade and turret pinnacles, and above it is a semicircular oriel window. The windows are casements with mullions and transoms. The garden front has five bays and two canted bay windows, and the longer north front has nine bays, and leads to the two-storey service wing.	II*
Dovecote, Rectory Farmhouse; 52.93667°N 1.95935°W	—	Mid 19th century	The dovecote is in red brick with a dentilled eaves course and a pyramidal tile roof. It has a square plan, and on two faces are blind three-light windows in Perpendicular style. At the top is a landing stage with a lead-covered pyramidal roof.	II
Dutch Barn, Heath House; 52.95176°N 1.96025°W	—	Mid 19th century (probable)	The Dutch barn is in red brick with stone dressings, and has a tile roof. There are five bays separated by three-stage piers, and the gable ends contain a full-height Gothic arch.	II
The Temple at SK 031399; 52.95684°N 1.95421°W		1850s	A folly constructed out of material from the verandah of the earlier Heath House after it was demolished. It is built in sandstone, it is in Classical style, and has a circular plan. On a stepped plinth are eight unfluted Ionic columns carrying a plain frieze, a cornice, and a dome.	II
St John's Church, Hollington; 52.94677°N 1.91298°W		1859–61	The church, designed by G. E. Street, is built in Hollington sandstone and has a tile roof. It consists of a nave and chancel in one unit, a round apse at the east end, and a north porch. At the west end is a large buttress and a bellcote on the gable. The windows have pointed trefoiled heads, and the east window has three lights.	II
Churchyard wall, St John's Church, Hollington; 52.94682°N 1.91280°W	—	1859–61 (probable)	The wall, which encloses the churchyard, is Hollington sandstone and has pitched coping. On the south side the wall is splayed where it contains double timber panelled gates and an overthrow.	II
Dovecote, Heybridge Farm; 52.94440°N 1.97715°W	—	c. 1863	The dovecote is in red brick on a plinth, with stone quoins, bracketed eaves, and a steep tile pyramidal roof with a wrought iron weathervane. It has a square plan, four storeys, and a cornice on corbels with nesting boxes. The dovecote contains a cart entry over which is a stone band.	II
