= William Whysall =

English cricketer (1887–1930)

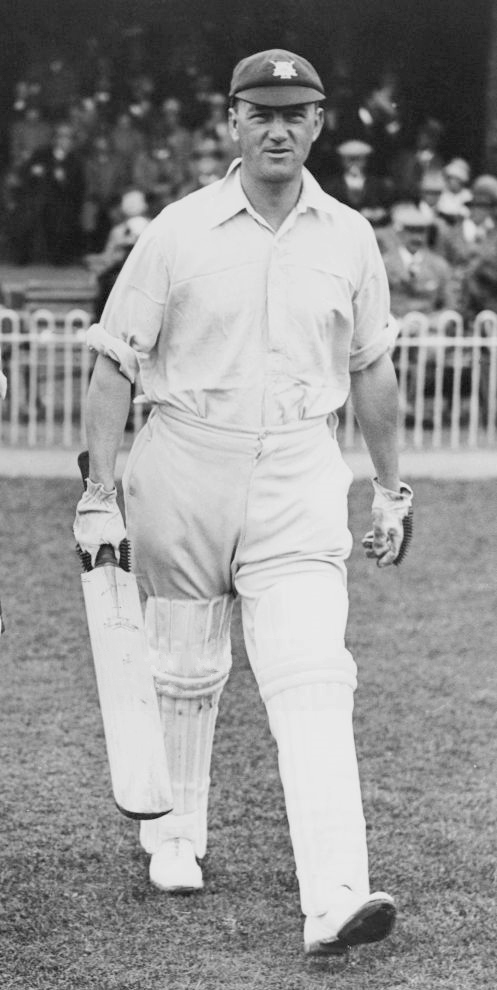
- "Dodger" Whysall in 1926

Personal information
- Full name: William Wilfrid Whysall
- Born: 31 October 1887; Woodborough, Nottinghamshire
- Died: 11 November 1930 (aged 43); Nottingham
- Batting: Right-handed
- Bowling: Right-arm medium
- Role: Batsman

International information
- National side: England
- Test debut (cap 223): 16 January 1925 v Australia
- Last Test: 16 August 1930 v Australia

Domestic team information
- Years: Team
- 1910–1930: Nottinghamshire
- 1923–1929: Players
- 1926–1927: North

Career statistics
Competition	Test	First-class
Matches	4	371
Runs scored	209	21,592
Batting average	29.85	38.76
100s/50s	0/2	51/103
Top score	76	248
Balls bowled	16	201
Wickets	0	6
Bowling average	–	33.33
5 wickets in innings	–	–
10 wickets in match	–	–
Best bowling	0/9	3/49
Catches/stumpings	7/–	317/15
- Source: CricketArchive, 16 November 2022

William Wilfrid Whysall (31 October 1887 – 11 November 1930), generally known as "Dodger" Whysall, was an English professional cricketer who played for Nottinghamshire County Cricket Club from 1910 to 1930, and in four Test matches for England from 1925 to 1930. He was born at Woodborough, Nottinghamshire, and died in a Nottingham hospital.

Whysall was a right-handed opening batsman who played in 371 first-class matches. He scored 21,592 career runs at an average of 38.76 runs per completed innings with a highest score of 248 as one of 51 centuries. Whysall was a noted slip fielder and an occasional wicket-keeper. He held 317 career catches and completed 15 stumpings. He rarely bowled but, as a right arm medium pace bowler, he took six first-class wickets with a best return of 3/49.

== Career ==
=== Early matches ===
Dodger Whysall is first recorded on 18 June 1908 in a one-day single innings match at Trent Bridge. Aged 20, he was playing for Nottinghamshire Club and Ground against Leicestershire Club and Ground and scored 25*. He played in several matches for Nottinghamshire's Second XI during the next two seasons, most of them in the Minor Counties Championship.

Whysall made his first-class debut on 18 August 1910 when he played for Nottinghamshire against Derbyshire in a County Championship match at the Miners Welfare Ground in Blackwell. He opened the batting with George Gunn and they shared a first wicket partnership of 100. Whysall scored 50 on debut and Gunn made 51. Nottinghamshire were all out for 261 and dismissed Derbyshire for 246. In the second innings, Whysall was out for 9 as Nottinghamshire reached 89/3 at close of play on the second day. The third day's play was rained off and the match was drawn.

At the end of the 1910 season, J. N. Pentelow, the editor of Cricket: A Weekly Record of the Game, wrote that Whysall was one of eleven new first-class players who were "likely to make names for themselves in the future". Apart from one innings of 57 in 1911, Whysall achieved little until July 1913 when he scored 97 against Gloucestershire at Trent Bridge. The report in Cricket says he hit ten boundaries and was "distinctly unlucky in skying the ball when only three short of his hundred". Whysall finally achieved his maiden century in the opening match of the 1914 season when Nottinghamshire played Marylebone Cricket Club (MCC) at Lord's on 6–8 May. Batting at number four in the order, Whysall joined Garnet Lee at 134/2 and they built a third wicket partnership of 175 in just 95 minutes. Whysall made 112 including one six, a five and twelve fours.

Whysall made 43 first-class appearances from 1910 to 1914, all for Nottinghamshire, and was becoming a more regular choice for the county team when World War I began on 4 August 1914. He was playing in a County Championship match at The Oval that day, against Surrey.

=== County cricket (1920–1930) ===
After the war ended, Whysall did not play in the 1919 season. He returned on 5 June 1920 when he was in the Nottinghamshire team for a County Championship match against Yorkshire at Headingley. He had scores of 19 and 7 in the match. Nottinghamshire won the toss and batted first but were all out for 215. Yorkshire scored 324 all out in reply, Wilfred Rhodes making 167 not out. Nottinghamshire were dismissed for 157 in the second innings and Yorkshire made 50 without loss to win by 10 wickets.

Through the early 1920s, Whysall made steady progress and, having scored 928 runs in the 1920 season, he made over 1,000 in each of the next ten with a highest total of 2,716 in 1929, when Nottinghamshire won the County Championship. He scored 1,852 runs in 1924, including six centuries, at the substantial average of 46.30 and, for his performances that season, he was chosen as a Wisden Cricketer of the Year in 1925. He was selected for the England tour of Australia in the winter of 1924–25. According to Wisden, Whysall was worth his place on the strength of his batting alone but in fact his wicket-keeping was the decisive factor, although he was not a specialist in the position, so he toured as Bert Strudwick's deputy.

Whysall was awarded two benefits by Nottinghamshire. The first in 1926 centred on a match against Yorkshire at Trent Bridge. The second, in 1931, was for his family after his early death.

In the winter of 1928–29, Whysall went to Jamaica with Sir Julien Cahn's XI and played in three first-class matches.

=== Test cricket ===
On the 1924–25 tour, Whysall played in three Tests. He scored 75 at the Adelaide Oval and 76 at the Melbourne Cricket Ground.

He was recalled to the England team for the decisive match of the 1930 series against Australia. The move was not a success. Whysall scored only 13 and 10, and was criticised for his lack of mobility in the field, as England lost by an innings.

== Death ==
Less than three months after his final Test, Whysall slipped on a dance floor and injured his elbow. Septicaemia set in and, despite a blood transfusion, he died in hospital on 11 November 1930.
