= Town Ground =

Town Ground may refer to:

== Cricket grounds ==
- Town Ground, Coalville
- Town Ground, Heanor
- Town Ground, Kettering
- Town Ground, Peterborough
- Town Ground, Rushden
- Town Ground, Worksop

It is also a former name of the Bass Worthington Ground in Burton-on-Trent.

== Football grounds ==
- Town Ground (Nottingham)

== Suburbs ==
- Town Ground, Honiara
