= Hollington, Staffordshire =

Village in Staffordshire, England

Coordinates: 52°56′58″N 1°55′08″W

Hollington
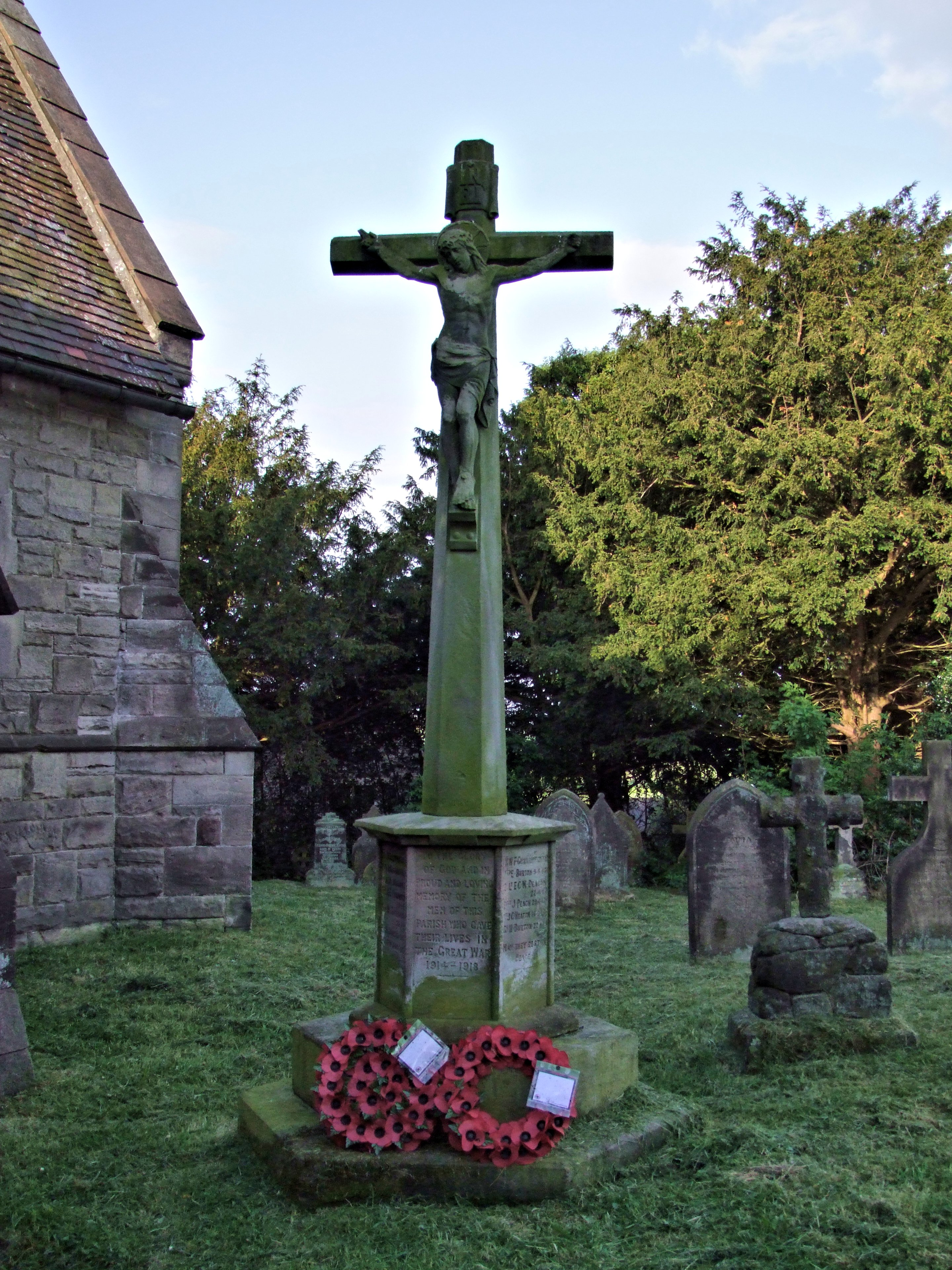
- Hollington War Memorial

- Location within Staffordshire
- Civil parish: Checkley
- District: Staffordshire Moorlands
- Shire county: Staffordshire
- Region: West Midlands
- Country: England
- Sovereign state: United Kingdom
- Post town: Stoke-on-Trent
- Postcode district: ST10
- Police: Staffordshire
- Fire: Staffordshire
- Ambulance: West Midlands
- UK Parliament: Stoke-on-Trent South

Hollington is a village in the civil parish of Checkley, in the Staffordshire Moorlands district in Staffordshire, England. There are several villages of this name, including Hollington, Derbyshire, a few miles to the east in the county of Derbyshire.

The village has a church, village hall and two pubs, The Star and The Raddle. The village shop closed in 1992.

== Local area ==
The village is situated on the south eastern corner of high ground, with a ridge extending to the south and deep valleys to the north, and enjoys beautiful views.

The nearest towns are the market towns of Cheadle to the north west, and Uttoxeter to the south east. The hamlet of Great Gate lies one mile to the north east.

It is close to Croxden Abbey and an ancient Roman road runs through the village from Rocester and Derby (Roman Derventio) in the east, and onwards to the north west through the village of Upper Tean. The Derbyshire section of the road is called Long Lane.

The nearest railway station is at Uttoxeter for the Crewe to Derby line and the nearest airport is East Midlands Airport.

== Sandstone production ==
Two quarries in the village, known as Ground Hollow, produce a Triassic new red sandstone, one of a notable pink-red colour with white flecks and the other of white colour. The pink-red stone is known as Hollington stone which has been widely used in the construction of ecclesiastic and civic buildings, and stately homes.

=== Notable buildings using Hollington stone ===
- Alton Towers
- Coventry Cathedral
- Drayton Manor
- Trentham Hall
- Walsall Town Hall
- Warwick Castle

It has been used in restorations of Lichfield, Worcester and Hereford Cathedrals, and Covent Garden Market.

== Church ==
The Church of St John the Evangelist is in the Parish of Croxden-with-Hollington and the Diocese of Lichfield. The church is part of the Dove and Churnet Benefice, which is served by a single vicar and also includes All Saints' Church, Denstone, St Giles Church, Croxden, and St Michael's Church, Rocester.

The church was designed by George Edmund Street in the Victorian Gothic Revival style. Construction was completed in early 1861 and the church is Grade II listed. Street also designed All Saint's Church, Denstone.

== See also ==
- Listed buildings in Checkley
