= Uttoxeter Road =

British cricket ground

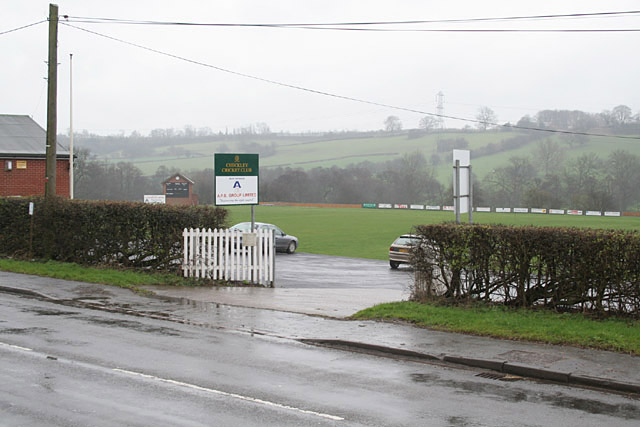

Ground information
- Location: Checkley, Staffordshire
- Coordinates: 52.9418°N 1.9685°W
- Establishment: c. 1924

Team information
Derbyshire	(1991–1993)
- As of 27 January 2013; Source: Ground profile

Uttoxeter Road (also known as Four Trees) is a cricket ground located along the Uttoxeter Road between the villages of Lower Tean and Checkley in Staffordshire. Completely surrounded by countryside, it is the home of Checkley Cricket Club.

The ground first appears on maps in 1924. Although located in Staffordshire, it was Derbyshire who used the ground for two List A matches, one in the 1991 Refuge Assurance League against Glamorgan and another against Hampshire in the 1993 AXA Equity & Law League. In the first match, Derbyshire made 251 all out from 39 overs, with Alan Warner's 51 the highest score of the innings. Daren Foster returned best figures for Glamorgan, with figures of 3/30. Despite a century by Matthew Maynard, who scored 101, Glamorgan fell 29 runs short of their target, with Ewan McCray taking the best figures of the innings with 4/49. The second match was abandoned without a ball bowled.

== See also ==
- List of cricket grounds in England and Wales
