= 1985 John Player Special League =

- Administrator: Test and County Cricket Board
- Cricket format: Limited overs cricket (40 overs per innings)
- Tournament format: League
- Champions: Essex (3rd title)
- Participants: 17
- Matches: 136
- Most runs: 663 Bill Athey (Gloucestershire)
- Most wickets: 26 Kevin Curran (Gloucs)/Norman Gifford (Warwicks)

The 1985 John Player Special League was the seventeenth competing of what was generally known as the Sunday League. The competition was won for the third time by Essex County Cricket Club.

Rain affected most rounds of the Sunday League that season with many abandoned, (27 no results, 20% of fixtures) and shortened matches. On 7 July at Knypersley, Derbyshire established a league record by hitting 18 sixes in their score of 292-9 from 40 overs. In the final round of matches on 15 September Essex beat Yorkshire at Chelmsford to retain the Sunday League. Sussex finished second and Hampshire finished third.

Essex had a great record in that season's three one-day competitions. Also winning the NatWest Trophy and finishing runners up in the third competition Benson and Hedges Cup.

== Standings ==
Team	Pld	W	T	L	N/R	A	Pts	R/R
Essex (C)	16	9	1	3	2	1	44	5.026
Sussex	16	10	0	5	0	1	42	5.065
Hampshire	16	8	0	4	2	2	40	5.225
Derbyshire	16	8	0	5	2	1	38	4.980
Northamptonshire	16	7	1	4	2	2	38	5.118
Gloucestershire	16	8	0	8	0	0	32	5.263
Leicestershire	16	5	1	5	4	1	32	4.408
Warwickshire	16	7	0	7	0	2	32	5.460
Yorkshire	16	6	0	6	1	3	32	5.263
Kent	16	6	0	7	1	2	30	4.790
Somerset	16	5	0	6	2	3	30	4.875
Middlesex	16	5	0	7	3	1	28	4.657
Nottinghamshire	16	6	0	8	1	1	28	5.178
Glamorgan	16	4	1	7	2	2	26	4.544
Lancashire	16	3	2	6	2	3	26	4.873
Worcestershire	16	5	0	9	1	1	24	5.346
Surrey	16	4	0	9	3	0	22	5.349
Team marked (C) finished as champions. Source: CricketArchive

== See also ==
- Sunday League
