= Burton-on-Trent CC Ground =

Cricket ground in Staffordshire, England

Coordinates: 52°48′54″N 1°37′7″W

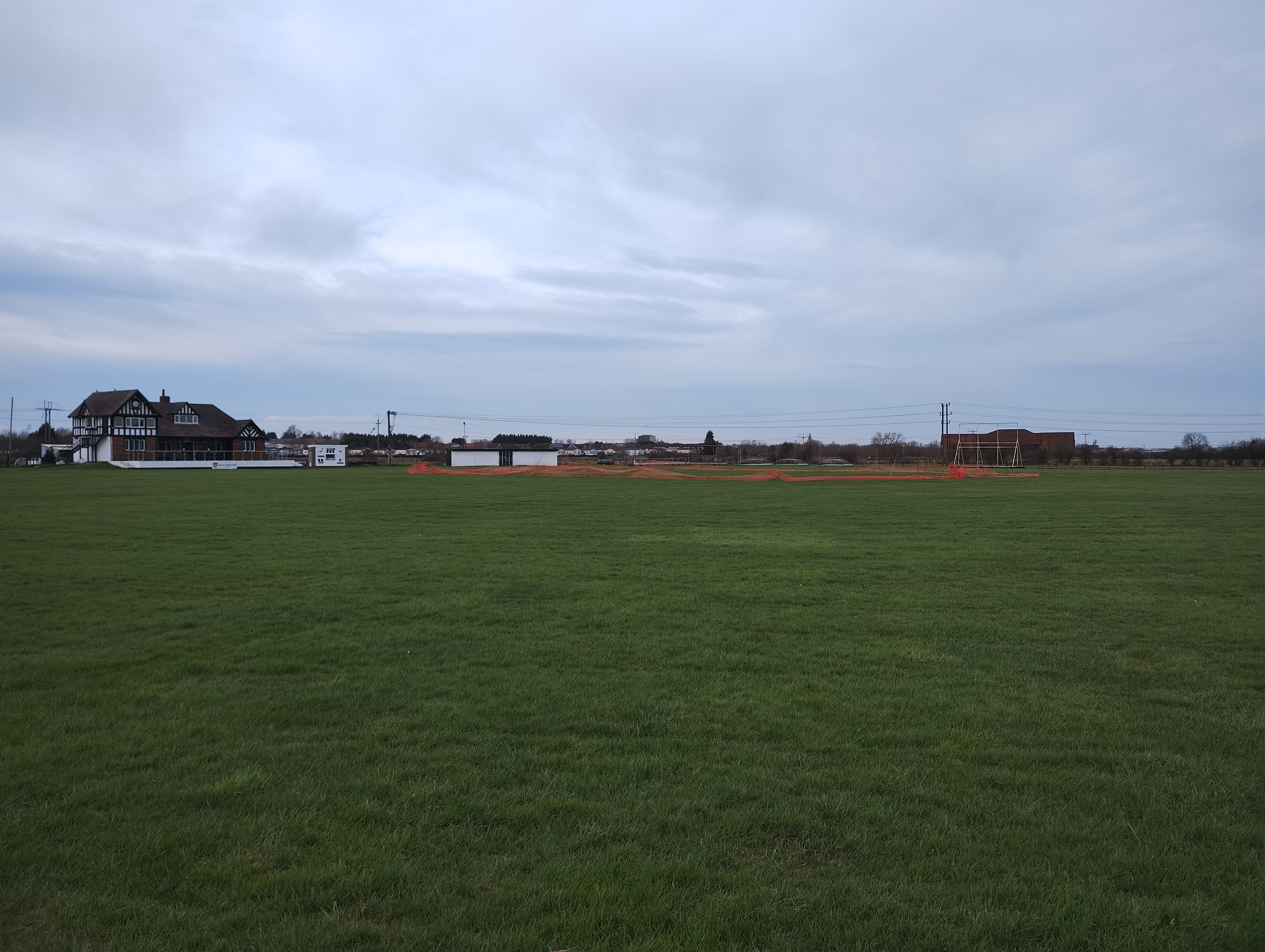
- Interactive map of Burton-on-Trent CC Ground

Ground information
- Location: Burton upon Trent, Staffordshire

Team information
Derbyshire	(1914–1937)

Burton-on-Trent Cricket Club Ground is a cricket ground in Burton, England used by Derbyshire CCC for 13 first-class matches between 1914 and 1937. The ground also hosted two ICC Trophy matches - Canada v Hong Kong in 1982 and East Africa v Malaysia in 1986.

Game Information:

Game Type	No. of Games
County Championship Matches	13
limited-over county matches	0
Twenty20 matches	0

Game Statistics: first-class:

Category	Information
Highest Team Score	There have been no instances of a team making 500 runs in an innings on this ground
Lowest Team Score	Cambridge University (107 against Derbyshire) in 1976
Best Batting Performance	Brian Bolus (151 Runs for Derbyshire against Oxford University in 1975
Best Bowling Performance	Srinivasaraghavan Venkataraghavan (8/77 for Derbyshire against Oxford University) in 1975
