= River Tean =

River in Staffordshire, England

Coordinates: 52.9068°N 1.8441°W

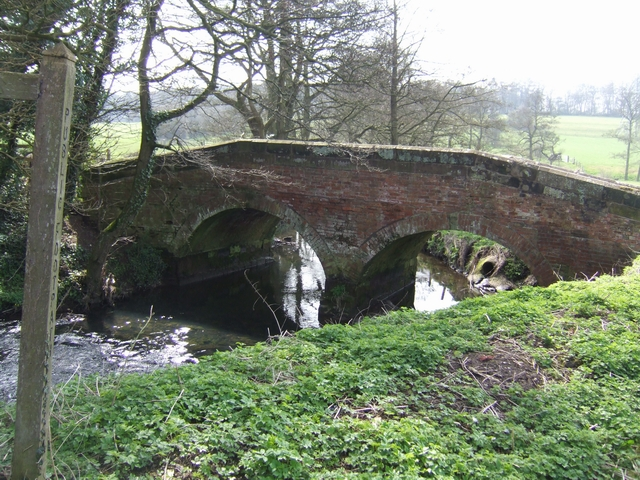
Hey Bridge, a grade II listed mid-19th-century bridge over the river Tean

The River Tean is a small river in the English county of Staffordshire.

== Description ==
This short river is a tributary of the River Dove; running 14.6 miles (23.5 km) south-east from its source at Dilhorne to its confluence with the Dove east of Uttoxeter.

The following settlements are located along the river

- Dilhorne (source)
- Cheadle
- Tean
- Checkley
- Fole
- Beamhurst
- Spath
- Uttoxeter (confluence with the River Dove)

Water levels are measured at two locations, Upper Tean and Leasows Farm north of Uttoxeter.

== Pollution ==
The river is subject to pollution from a range of diffuse and point sources, including sewage discharge, urban development and poor livestock management. Environment Agency data shows that in 2023, the river was polluted by Severn Trent Water on 106 occasions, totaling 335 hours of continuous discharge. Discharges along the river had steadily decreased between 2020 and 2022 but increased in 2023. Historic and ongoing pollution has led to a complete kill of a four mile stretch of the river below the Severn Trent Water sewage treatment plant at Checkley. Published Event Duration Monitoring (EDM) data shows that raw sewage discharges from the Combined Sewer Outfalls (CSO) are increasing in frequency, even during dry periods.

== Angling ==
At least one angling club operates along the river, which supports populations of grayling and brown trout, with lesser numbers of river chub, common dace and Perch. Stretches of the river are suitable for fly fishing.
