= Station Road, Darley Dale =

Cricket ground in Derbyshire, England

Coordinates: 53°09′26″N 1°35′57″W

Station Road
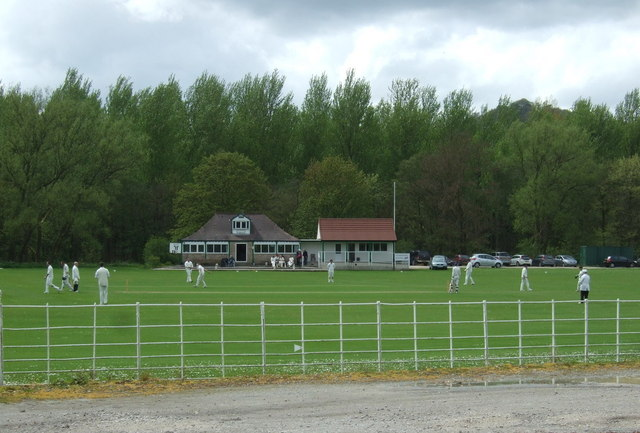
- The ground in 2014
- Interactive map of Station Road

Ground information
- Location: Darley Dale, Derbyshire
- Country: England
- Home club: Darley Dale
- County club: Derbyshire
- Establishment: 1863

Team information
Derbyshire	(1975)
Derbyshire Women	(2013)
- As of 21 July 2016; Source: CricketArchive

Station Road is a cricket ground in Darley Dale, Derbyshire, England, which has hosted only one top-class match: the 1975 John Player League match between Derbyshire and Hampshire. The away side won by 70 runs thanks to fifties from Barry Richards and Gordon Greenidge, and Thomas Mottram and John Rice taking five and four wickets respectively.
