= St Mary's and All Saints' Church, Checkley =

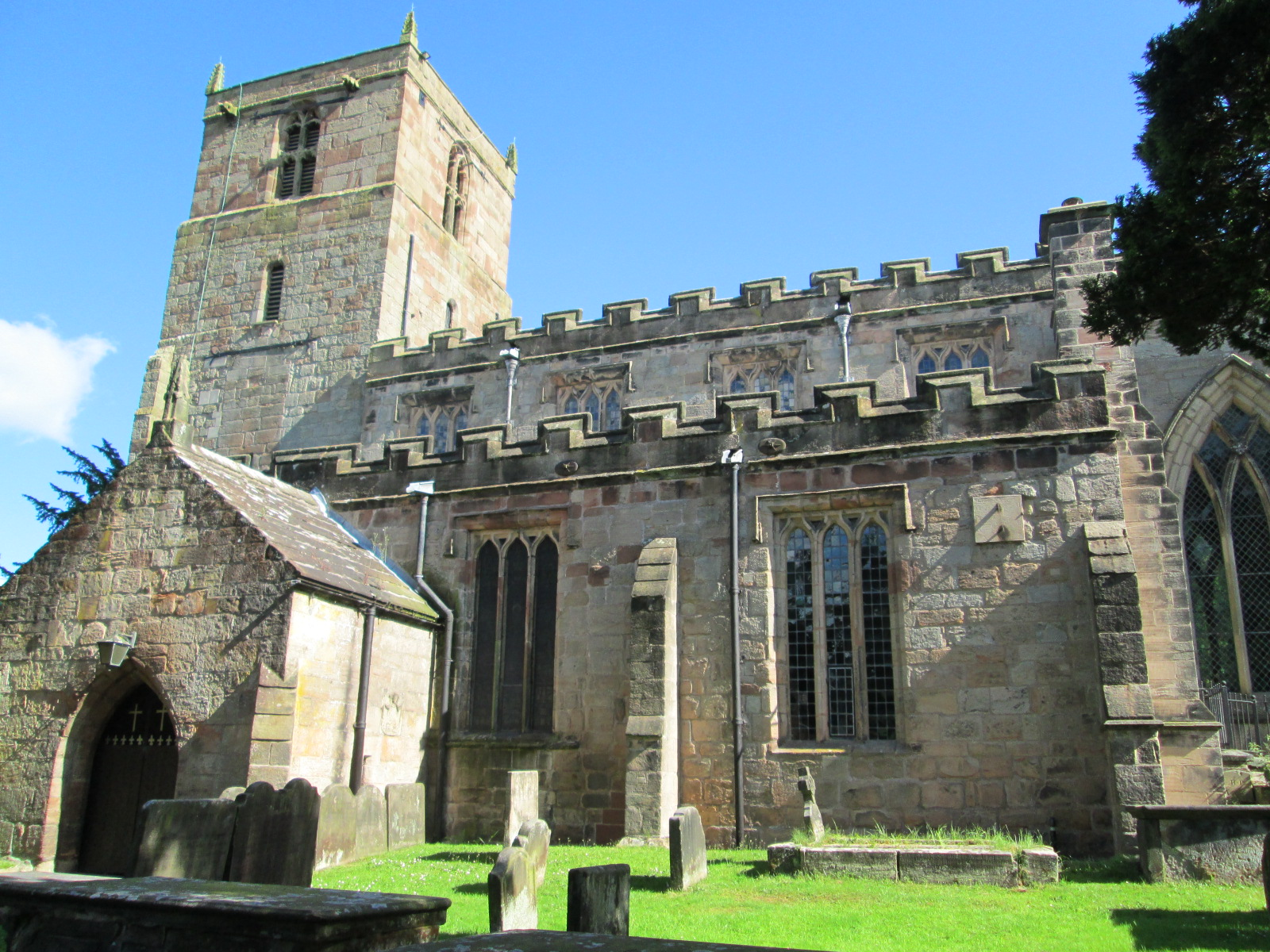
- The tower and nave, seen from the south
- St Mary's and All Saints' Church, Checkley
- 52°56′18″N 1°57′35″W
- OS grid reference: SK 028 379
- Location: Checkley, Staffordshire
- Country: England
- Denomination: Church of England
- Website: http://www.checkleychurch.co.uk/

Architecture
- Heritage designation: Grade I
- Designated: 3 January 1967

Administration
- Diocese: Diocese of Lichfield
- Deanery: Uttoxeter Deanery

St Mary's and All Saints' Church is an Anglican church in the village of Checkley, Staffordshire, England. It is a Grade I listed building. The oldest parts of the building are 12th-century, with later medieval and 17th-century work.

== Description ==
The lower storey of the tower is 12th-century, the later upper part being in Perpendicular style. The south door, protected by a porch, is of about 1300.

The nave has four bays, and the clerestory windows above are 17th-century. The north arcade is 13th-century, and the round-arched north aisle windows are 17th-century. The south arcade is taller than the north arcade; although parts are of the 12th century, it was later remodelled. The pointed chancel arch is early 13th-century.

The chancel, of four bays, is late 13th-century; the pointed five-light east window and three-light side windows have intersecting tracery. The glass in the chancel is 14th-century.

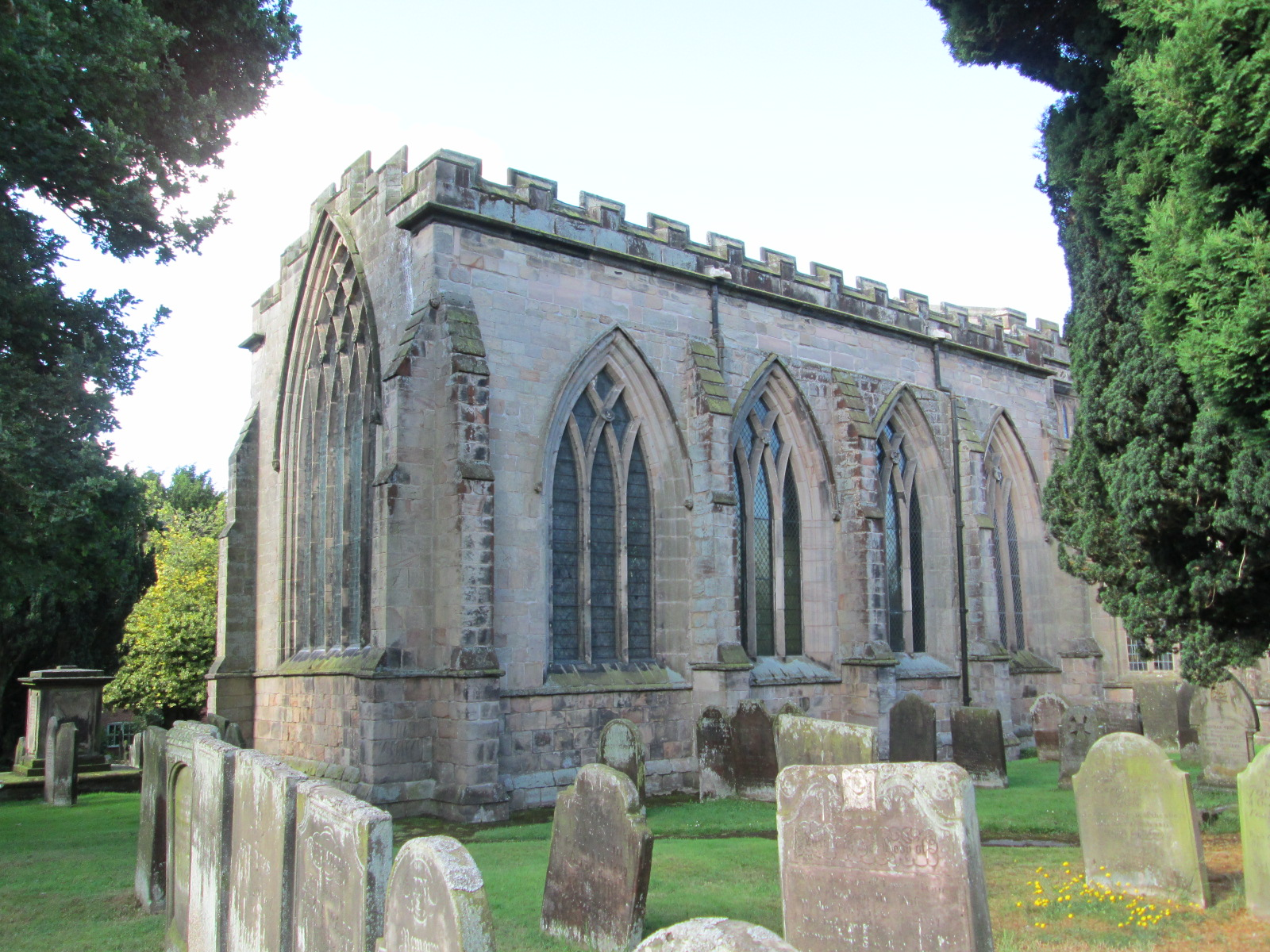
The chancel, showing the east and north windows

The font is a cylindrical bowl on a shaft, both 12th-century. The bowl is decorated with low relief carvings: there is a Lamb of God on an altar, with panels around the bowl containing irregular patterns of triangles.

=== Anglo-Scandinavian stone crosses ===
In the churchyard, south of the church, are three early medieval stone crosses; they are close together and are thought to be standing in or near their original positions. There is a tradition that the crosses were erected in memory of three bishops killed in a battle near the village. They are regarded as among the finest Anglo-Scandinavian crosses in Staffordshire.

They each have a tapering, rectangular section, each being part of a longer cross-shaft. The southern cross (height 1.6 metres (5.2 ft)) and central cross (height 1.35 metres (4.4 ft)) are decorated on all four sides; there are full-length human figures and plaitwork patterns, on panels separated on the southern cross with curved divisions, on the central cross with straight divisions. The northern cross (height 1.43 metres (4.7 ft)) is undecorated.

== See also ==
- Grade I listed churches in Staffordshire
