= The Heath House =

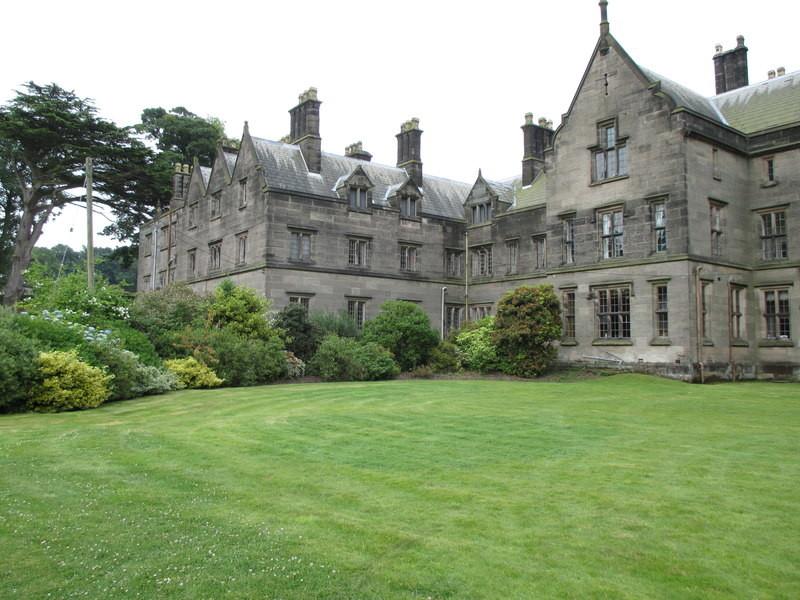
- Interactive map of the The Heath House area

General information
- Type: Mansion
- Architectural style: Gothic Revival
- Location: England
- Inaugurated: 1836

The Heath House is a Gothic Revival mansion and estate located near the village of Tean in Staffordshire, England.

== History ==
The current house was first constructed in 1836 for John Burton Philips of J. & N. Philips textiles (previously a High Sheriff of Staffordshire) and his wife, Joanna. However, the Philips family first bought the estate in the 1680s, and the current house replaced an existing Georgian mansion. The architect was Thomas Johnson of Lichfield. Notable guests who have visited The Heath House over the years include Florence Nightingale, who came to the house after the Crimean War. The Heath House was requisitioned for the Red Cross during World War II, and was used as an auxiliary hospital for military personnel. After the war the property was returned to the Philips family. The house is a Grade II* listed building.

== Television appearances ==
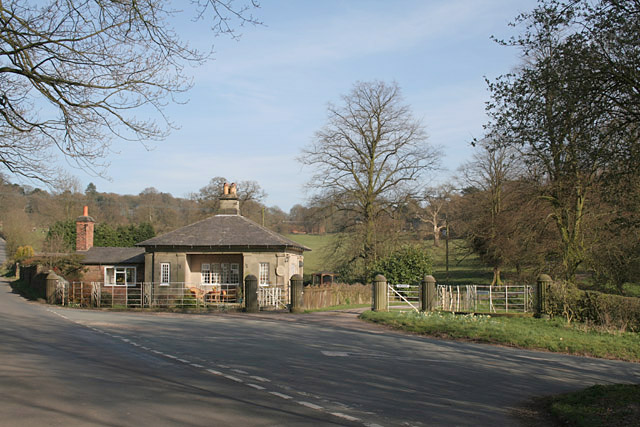
The Front lodge

In March 2010 and September 2011, The Heath House was the subject of a Channel 4 television programme presented by hotelier Ruth Watson as part of her Country House Rescue series.

On 19 January 2011, it was featured as one of four different houses to be shown on the ITV1 television show May The Best House Win. Family representative Ben Philips showed the guests around it.

Heath House has also been used as a location in:

- The Hound of the Baskervilles (Jeremy Brett, 1987)
- Agatha Christie: They Do It with Mirrors (1991)
- BBC adaptation of Tim Pears' novel In a Land of Plenty (1991).

== See also ==
- J. & N. Philips
