= Derby Road Ground =

Cricket ground in Wirksworth, Derbyshire, England

Coordinates: 53°04′29″N 1°34′45″W

- Interactive map of Derby Road Ground

Ground information
- Location: Wirksworth, Derbyshire
- Country: England
- Home club: Wirksworth and Middleton
- County club: Derbyshire
- Establishment: 1866 (first recorded match)

Team information
Derbyshire	(1874)
- As of 15 August 2010; Source: Ground profile

Derby Road Ground is a cricket ground in Wirksworth, Derbyshire. The first recorded match on the ground was in 1866, when Wirksworth played an All England Eleven. Derbyshire played a single first-class match on the ground against Kent in 1874.

In local domestic cricket the ground is the home of Wirksworth & Middleton Cricket Club.
