= Longton Cricket Club Ground =

Cricket ground in England

Coordinates: 52°58′16″N 2°09′13″W

Ground information
- Location: Stoke-on-Trent, Staffordshire
- Establishment: 1954 (first recorded match)

Team information
| Staffordshire | (1954-present) |
| Minor Counties | (1959-1960, 1969 & 1972) |
| Minor Counties North | (1975) |
| Minor Counties East | (1976) |
- As of 14 August 2010; Source: Ground profile

Longton Cricket Club Ground is a cricket ground in Stoke-on-Trent, Staffordshire. The first recorded match on the ground was in 1954, when Staffordshire played Northumberland in the grounds first Minor Counties Championship match. From 1954 to present, the ground has hosted 40 Minor Counties Championship matches and 7 MCCA Knockout Trophy matches.

A combined Minor Counties team has used the ground for 4 first-class matches, the first of which came in 1955 against the touring South Africans. The last first-class match held on the ground came in 1972 and saw the Minor Counties play the touring Australians.

The ground has held List-A matches. Staffordshire have played two List-A matches at the ground against Glamorgan in the 1971 Gillette Cup and Leicestershire in the 1975 Gillette Cup. Minor Counties North played a single List-A match at the ground in the 1975 Benson and Hedges Cup against Lancashire. Minor Counties East used the ground for a single List-A match against Northamptonshire in the 1976 Benson and Hedges Cup.

In local domestic cricket, Longton Cricket Club Ground is the home ground of Longton Cricket Club who play in the North Staffordshire and South Cheshire League.
