= Park Road, Buxton =

Cricket ground in Buxton, Derbyshire, England

Coordinates: 53°15′35″N 1°55′16″W

Park Road ground in the 1960s

Park Road is a cricket ground in Buxton, Derbyshire, England. It is the home ground of Buxton Cricket Club, and was formerly used by the Derbyshire County Cricket Club first XI between 1923 and 1986. The first First-class match on the ground was in June 1923, when Derbyshire faced the touring West Indians. The ground’s biggest claim to fame came in 1975, when the second day’s play of the County Championship match against Lancashire was wiped out due to snow. Derbyshire generally played one County Championship match at Buxton every year from 1930 to 1976, but have only played there four times since. The most recent first-class match was in August 1986 against Lancashire, who have provided the opposition for 26 of the 48 first-class games at the ground. The ground also hosted ten Derbyshire List A fixtures between 1969 and 1986.

Game information:

| Game type | No. of games |
|---|---|
| County Championship Matches | 44 |
| limited-over county matches | 10 |
| Twenty20 matches | 0 |

Game statistics: first-class:

| Category | Information |
|---|---|
| Highest team score | There have been no team scores of more than 500 on this ground |
| Lowest team score | Lancashire (36 against Derbyshire) in 1954 |
| Best batting performance | Clive Lloyd (167 runs for Lancashire against Derbyshire in 1975 |
| Best bowling performance | Cliff Gladwin (9/119 for Derbyshire against Lancashire) in 1947 |

Game statistics: one-day:

| Category | Information |
|---|---|
| Highest team score | Warwickshire (236/8 in 40 overs against Derbyshire) in 1974 |
| Lowest team score | Somerset (99 in 39.3 overs against Derbyshire) in 1969 |
| Best batting performance | Alan Hill (120 runs for Derbyshire against Northamptonshire in 1976 |
| Best bowling performance | Philip Russell (6/10 for Derbyshire against Northamptonshire) in 1976 |
