= Repton School Ground =

Cricket ground in Derbyshire, England

Coordinates: 52°50′27.16″N 1°32′57.82″W

- Interactive map of Repton School Ground

Ground information
- Location: Repton, Derbyshire
- Country: England
- County club: Derbyshire
- Establishment: 1845
- Owner: Repton School

Team information
Derbyshire	(1988)
Derbyshire Women	(2011–2012)
- As of 21 July 2016; Source: CricketArchive

Repton School Ground is a cricket ground in Repton, Derbyshire, England, owned by Repton School and used by the school's teams. The ground has hosted a single List A match, when Derbyshire faced Middlesex in a 40-over Refuge Assurance League match in 1988. Middlesex fielded first, and bowled the hosts out for 130 off 37.1 overs, despite Steve Goldsmith's 61. Angus Fraser returned figures of 8-2-8-3. Rain curtailed the match during the Middlesex reply with the score at 32/0 after 10.2 overs, and, as insufficient overs had been bowled according to the competition rules, the match was considered a no result.

The ground is also used by Derbyshire for 2nd XI and youth fixtures. Derbyshire Women have played two Women's County Championship matches at Repton, in 2011 and 2012.
