= Tean, Staffordshire =

Village in Staffordshire, England

Coordinates: 52.951°N 1.985°W

Tean
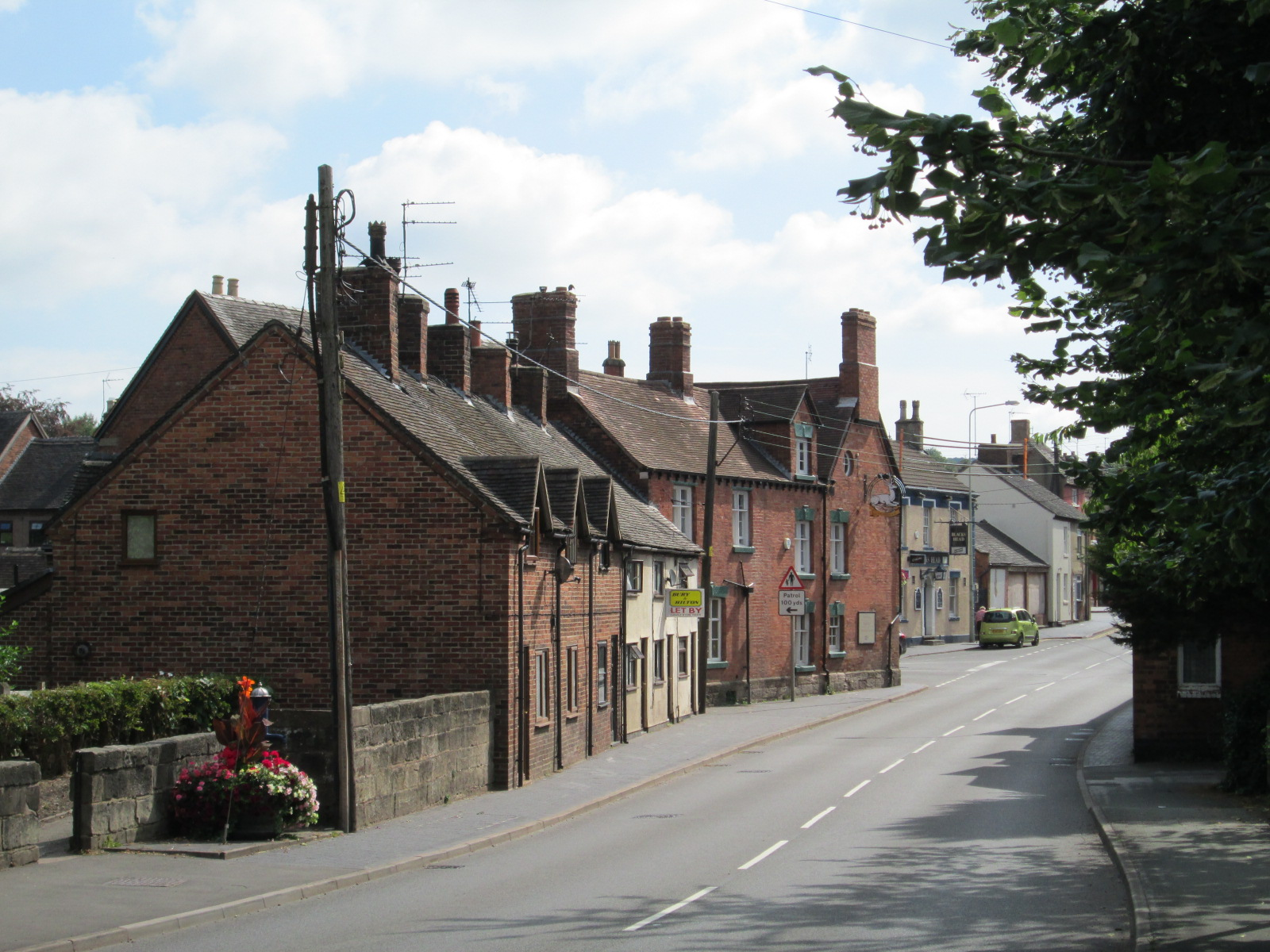
- High Street, Upper Tean

- Location within Staffordshire
- Civil parish: Checkley
- District: Staffordshire Moorlands
- Shire county: Staffordshire
- Region: West Midlands
- Country: England
- Sovereign state: United Kingdom
- Post town: STOKE-ON-TRENT
- Postcode district: ST10
- Dialling code: 01538
- Police: Staffordshire
- Fire: Staffordshire
- Ambulance: West Midlands
- UK Parliament: Stoke-on-Trent South

Tean is a large village in the civil parish of Checkley in the Staffordshire Moorlands district, in the county of Staffordshire, England. It is around 15 miles (24 km) south-east of Stoke-on-Trent. The River Tean runs through the village, heading east towards Uttoxeter.

The village is itself composed of two villages: Upper Tean and Lower Tean. It is part of the Checkley ward. At the 2021 census the population of Tean was 98.7% white, 0.7% mixed, 0.4% Asian and 0.2% black.

The Heath House, a Gothic Revival mansion and estate, is located to the east of the village. The village also contains an historic tape mill (now converted into apartments / flats).

There are a number of pubs and shops, a doctors' surgery, nurseries, a village hall (Greatwood Hall), three churches, and a small park. There is free car parking signposted off one end of the High Street (between the two pubs).

Major employers in the area include Alton Towers, JCB, Toyota, and Fox's Biscuits.

== History ==
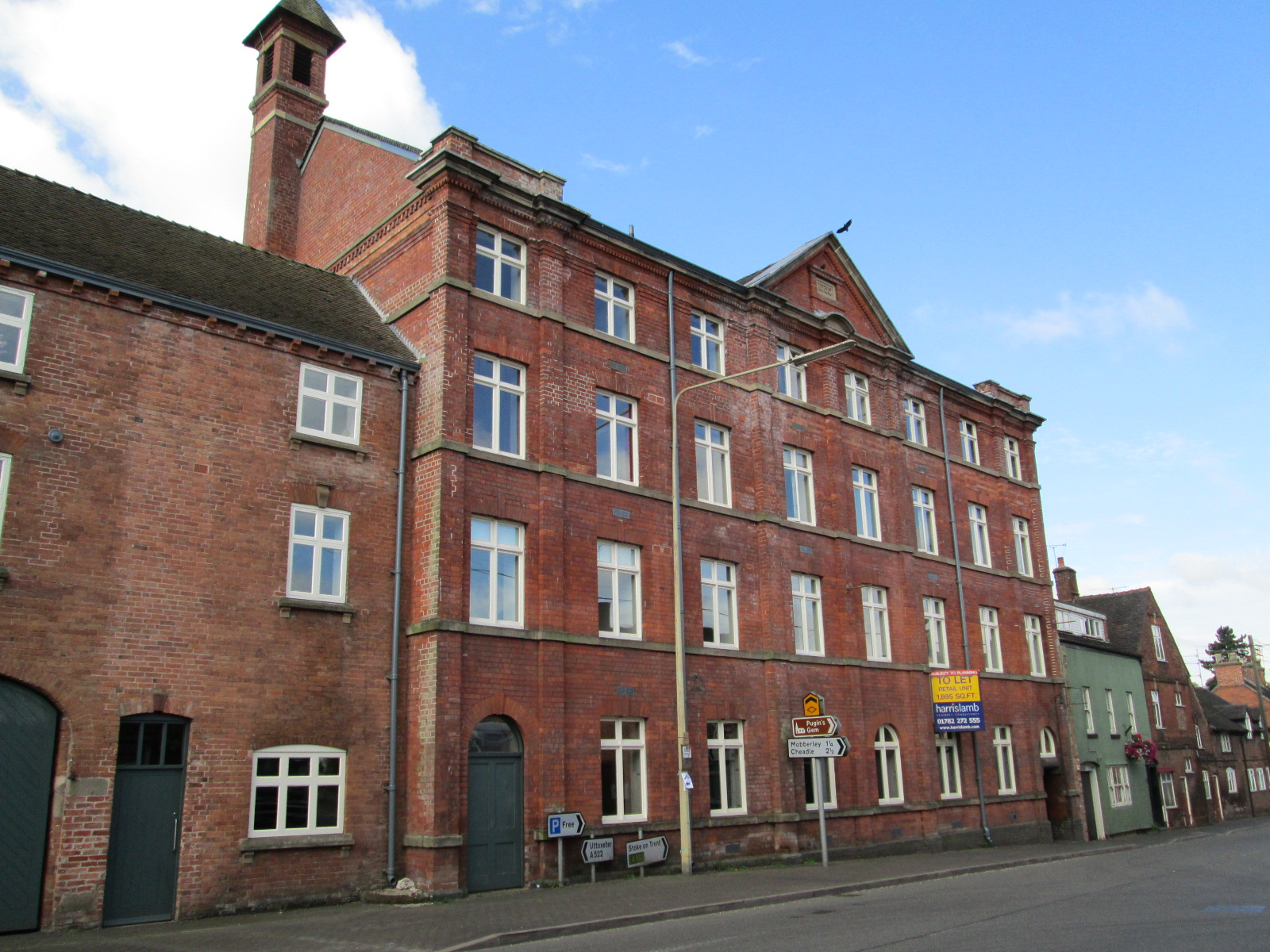
Tape mill on High Street, Upper Tean

The village was within the ancient Hundred of Totmonslow as Tene in the Domesday Book survey of 1086, when it had 15 households.

In the 18th century, a tape weaving company was established in the village by John and Nathaniel Philips: in 1747 they bought Tean Hall, a half-timbered building in Upper Tean built in 1613, and it became a base for their company. Tapes were at first produced in tape-weavers' cottages, using looms provided by the company. From the early 19th century, factories, housing steam-powered Jacquard looms, were built in the village; the factories, adjacent to Tean Hall, were known as Tean Hall Mills.

Manufacturing has ceased in Tean, but the mill buildings, now converted into apartments / flats, remain a notable feature of Upper Tean High Street.

== Transport ==
The village is well positioned for transport, with road / bus connections east to Uttoxeter and Derby, and west to Stoke.

Tean lies at the crossroads of the A522 road between Cheadle, Staffordshire and Uttoxeter, and the road from Blythe Bridge to Rocester. It is a 10-minute drive east or west to join the main A50 at either Uttoxeter or Blythe Bridge. From the A50 there are direct links to both the M1 and M6.

The village is approximately 50 minutes from both Manchester and East Midlands airports, and 1 hour 10 minutes from Birmingham airport.

The village was served by Tean railway station at Totmonslow (to the west of the village) until its closure in 1953. The nearest railway stations now are Blythe Bridge and Uttoxeter - both branch line - or Derby and Stoke - for main lines.

D&G Buses serve the village.

== Education ==
There are two primary schools in Tean: St Thomas' Roman Catholic and Greatwood; with most children progressing to secondary schools in either Cheadle or Uttoxeter. Other nearby secondary schools include: Denstone / Abbotsholme (Rocester) / JCB Academy (Rocester) / Blythe Bridge.

== See also ==
- Listed buildings in Checkley
- J. & N. Philips
