= Trent College Ground =

Public School in Long Eaton, Derbyshire, England

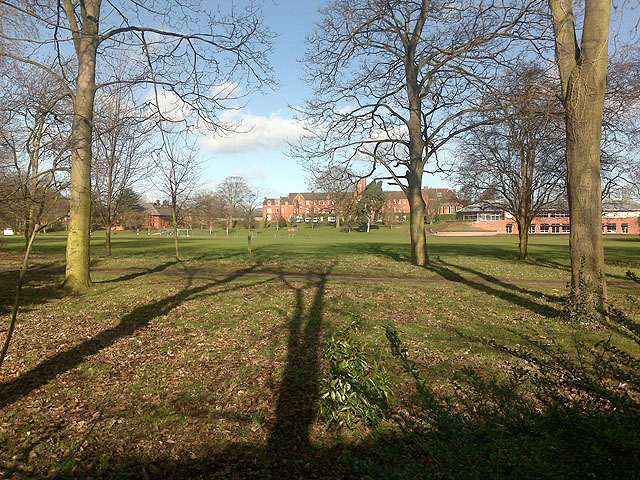
- Trent College Grounds (2009)
- Interactive map of Trent College Ground
- Full name: Trent College
- Location: Derby Road; Long Eaton; NG10 4AD
- Coordinates: 52.8985°N 1.2833°W
- Owner: Trent College
- Surface: Grass
- Record attendance: 6,000 (Derbyshire v. Kent, John Player League, 6 July 1975)

Construction
- Built: 1868
- Opened: 1869

The Trent College Ground is a cricket ground at Trent College in Long Eaton, Derbyshire, England. The ground has hosted five List A matches, all John Player League matches involving Derbyshire, who played one match each year at the ground from 1975 to 1979, with an estimated 6,000 spectators packed into the ground for the Derbyshire vs Kent match on 6 July 1975. Evidence of cricket being played on Trent College grounds date back to 1869, with records revealing two matches that year (one of them against Appleby Grammar School). Trent won both matches.

== Game information ==
Game Type	No. of Games
County Championship Matches	0
limited-over county matches	5
Twenty20 matches	0

=== One-day matches ===
Category	Information
Highest Team Score	Derbyshire (233/4 in 39.2 overs against Surrey) in 1978
Lowest Team Score	Derbyshire (130/9 in 40 overs against Leicestershire) in 1977
Best Batting Performance	Mark Faber (71 Runs for Sussex against Derbyshire) in 1976
Best Bowling Performance	Peter Kirsten (5/34 for Derbyshire against Northamptonshire) in 1979
