= J. & N. Philips =

J. & N. Philips and Company was a business established in 1747 by members of the Philips family, and which ceased trading in 1970. Originally based in Tean, Staffordshire, England, the business was a manufacturer of textile products that expanded both by organic growth and by taking over other businesses involved in the manufacture and merchanting of textile products and smallware. It formed a part of a network of companies operated by the family, whose business interests came to include manufacture of hats and textiles such as linen smallwares, silks and fustians, as well as cotton spinning and dealing, power loom weaving, export merchanting and general warehousing. The family made the majority of its wealth from their involvement in the trans-Atlantic Slave Trade. The family was also involved in politics, with George Philips, Mark Philips and Robert Needham Philips all being Members of Parliament and all promoting the ideals of Manchesterism while in office. George's son, George Richard Philips, was also a member of the House of Commons.

== Origins ==
Francis Phylyppe, a Fleming, had settled in the English county of Staffordshire in the 16th century. His successors became minor landed gentry in the area until the lure of the newly industrialising city of Manchester caused two of them, brothers Nathaniel (1698–1776) and Thomas (1701–1782), to move there in the early part of the 18th century. The brothers probably set up businesses manufacturing smallwares but their older sibling, John, stayed in rural Staffordshire and gained the title of lord of the manor of Tean and Checkley. (Note: While Wadsworth and Mann speculated in 1931 that Nathaniel and Thomas Philips set up a smallwares business in Manchester in the early 18th century, Beverly Lemire has subsequently found evidence that Nathaniel certainly did.) Some sources say that John Philips had a business manufacturing linen tape, and that it was this enterprise that formed the basis for the steps that would be taken by his sons.

== Early years ==
=== In Staffordshire ===
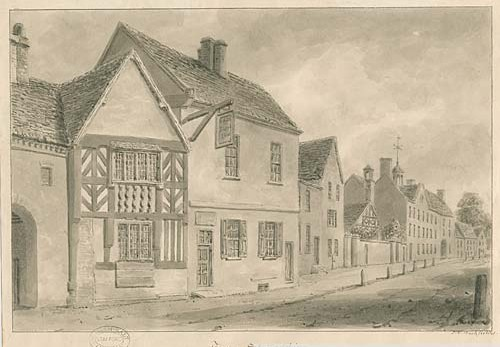
The building on the right that is topped with a cupola Tean Mill in 1841

Those steps began in 1747 when a business partnership called J. & N. Philips was formed by two of John's sons, John (1724–1803) and Nathaniel (1726–1808). They either rented or bought the 17th-century Tean Hall from the Ashley family for the purpose and it is probable that they had previously spent some time gaining manufacturing experience with their relatives in Manchester. A third brother, Thomas (1728–1811), joined the partnership within a few years while continuing to manage a hatting business that was being financed by his siblings in Manchester.

The business in the somewhat remote village of Tean was a manufacturer of pure linen tape, in contrast to their competitors' tapes made using mixes that included cotton and worsted. The raw material – regarding the quality of which they were very particular – came mostly from Europe via merchants in London and the main outlet for the finished product was warehousemen in London, although they also developed ties with many haberdashers elsewhere in the country. (Note: Although Manchester was known for its imports of yarn and at 45 miles (72 km) distance was much closer than London, there were no direct transport links between Manchester and Tean; nearby canal links to London probably made carriage to and from Tean both cheaper and more reliable despite the additional distance. Bleaching, in particular, was a necessary process and one that could not be started before March or after August due to the weather, so reliability of supplies was important.) The business eventually became the largest manufacturer of tapes in England.

Manufacture was initially mostly arranged using the outwork system, with the brothers providing looms for use in the workers' cottages. A local carpenter made the looms after being shown how to do so by a Dutchman who had been brought into the village by the brothers for that purpose. A loom house and bleaching facilities existed by 1755 and a warehouse and a room to house looms at Tean Hall were constructed in the 1770s. (Note: It is possible that what became the finishing shop in the Tean Hall Mills structure contains parts of a building originally constructed in 1747 and later expanded in 1774–1775; other elements of the construction date from 1816 and 1833.) The move away from outwork in favour of the factory system continued with a building added in the 1790s at Tape Street in Cheadle but the Philips were still constructing cottages for their employees as late as 1798, when eight built in a terrace called Double Row each contained four looms on the ground floor. The end of outwork came around 1823 following the construction of a multi-storey building in Tean and adaptations at Cheadle, both of which now housed steam-powered Jacquard looms. Just prior to these developments the business was employing between 2,000 and 3,000 people and had 300 looms in Tean, 120 in Cheadle, 50 in Kingsley and possibly a further 80 at Draycott-in-the-Moors. The mill buildings came to physically dominate Tean and to be known as Tean Hall Mills.

=== In Manchester ===
As the century progressed, the Philips brothers' personal and business ties with Manchester grew closer despite their continuing links with London; by its end, they had greater interests in the northern city than in Staffordshire. The relationships are, however, obscure, in part because names were shared across generations. Chapman says that the hatting business was established around 1750 at Dolefield in Manchester and was known as Thomas Philips & Co. He says that the business also manufactured tape. Watson and Mann say that this business was known as Thomas & Nathaniel Philips by the early 1770s. Chapman notes a smallwares manufacturer called Nathaniel & Falkner Philips, operating on two sites not far from Manchester, in Radcliffe and Whitefield. The Nathaniel involved in this was the uncle of the partners in J. & N. Philips, while Falkner refers to his son, Thomas Falkner Philips (1744-?). Watson and Mann differ from Chapman regarding the origin of these two operations, which they say were established by the Tean partnership, although they do agree that N. & F. Philips were manufacturing smallwares in Manchester in the 1770s. They add that the Tean partnership of J. & N. Philips also operated from a warehouse in Manchester at that time and refer also to a business called Nathaniel & John Philips, who manufactured silk and linen goods.

Both Nathaniel and Thomas Philips were living nearby, at Stand and Sedgley Park, respectively.

Many merchants, and particularly the smaller ones, suffered financial ruin while speculating for new markets around the time of the Napoleonic Wars. However, the Philips family enterprises, which in common with some other manufacturers of textiles had used profits to diversify into mercantile activities, were by that time exporting to America and were able to strengthen their position. By now under the control of a second generation of Philips, the businesses were among a group of manufacturers who are described by Stanley Chapman as having "built up much more sophisticated [export] marketing organisations than that required by simple opportunism."

A building designed for manufacture of clothing was added to the complex at Tean in the 20th century and the company had diversified from tape manufacture into areas such as production of medal ribbons, labels for clothing and even artificial arteries for use in medical operations.

Described in 1931 as "one of the largest Manchester commercial houses of the present day", J. & N. Philips ceased trading in 1970.

== Philanthropy ==
The Philips family had a history of philanthropic activity. They arranged the construction of octagonal privies adjacent to the cottages used by their weavers (Note: Photographs exist of some of these now-demolished privies.) and, in 1811, they established a school based on the British School system for their workers there. (Note: The school was rebuilt in 1855.) They were also known for assisting poor people in the area during times of hardship.

== Legacy ==
Tean Hall Mills continued as a manufacturing site for some time after the demise of J. & N. Philips, operating in conjunction with a related company, Rykneld Mills of Derby, as Rykneld Tean Ltd. The buildings were subsequently derelict for a while but they still stand and have now been converted into apartments. Cottages formerly used by the weavers also exist. The nearby Heath House, designed in the Tudor style as a home for John Burton Philips in 1836, also still stands and remains in family ownership.

== See also ==
- John Leigh Philips
