= Tunstall Road =

Cricket ground in England

Ground information
- Location: Knypersley, Staffordshire
- Coordinates: 53.1045°N 2.1787°W
- Establishment: 1870
- Capacity: 5,000
- End names
- Tunstall Road End; Scoreboard End

Team information
Staffordshire	(1946-2021)
Derbyshire	(1985-1990)
- As of 14 August 2010; Source: Ground profile

Tunstall Road, also known as Victoria and Knypersley Social Welfare Centre, is a cricket ground in Knypersley, Staffordshire. The ground is located along the Tunstall Road, which itself forms part of the A527 Road. It has played host to List A matches for Derbyshire County Cricket Club, in addition to playing host to Staffordshire County Cricket Club in minor counties cricket.

== History ==
The ground was established in 1870 as the home ground of Knypersley Cricket Club. Staffordshire first played minor counties cricket there in the 1946 Minor Counties Championship, playing once a year there until 1955. After playing there in 1960, Staffordshire returned to the ground in 1976 and played one match per season there until 1987. Derbyshire first used Tunstall Road as an outground in 1985, playing a List A one-day match there against Worcestershire in the John Player Special League. Derbyshire played two further one-day matches there, in 1988 against Worcestershire and 1990 against Leicestershire. Derbyshire's use of the ground was part of an agreement with Staffordshire County Council to stage one Sunday match in Staffordshire per year, alternating between three venues. The other two venues were at Cheadle and Leek. Staffordshire continue to use the ground for minor counties fixtures, having also played MCCA Knockout Trophy and National Counties T20 fixtures at the ground. Tunstall Road has also played host to Staffordshire Women in one-day and Twenty20 matches.

The pavilion at the ground is a black and white timber structure which stands above the ground on a high bank. The ground was formerly shared with Biddulph Victoria F.C., until they folded at the end of the 2010–11 season and were evicted from the ground. Other structures at the ground include a scoreboard and the old pavilion, which serves as a clubhouse. The ground has a capacity of up to 5,000, with Derbyshire attracting crowds of 3,500 to 4,000.

== Records ==
=== List A ===
- Highest team total: 292 for 9 by Derbyshire v Worcestershire, 1985
- Lowest team total: 104 all out by Leicestershire v Derbyshire, 1990
- Highest individual innings: 91 by Phil Neale for Worcestershire v Derbyshire, 1988
- Best bowling in an innings: 5-39 by Alan Warner, for Derbyshire v Worcestershire, 1985
