= Miners Welfare Ground =

Cricket ground in Blackwell, England

Coordinates: 53°07′10″N 1°21′05″W

The Miners Welfare Ground is a cricket ground in Blackwell, England that Derbyshire CCC used between 1909 and 1913.

The ground hosted 7 first-class matches.

Game Information:

Game Type	No. of Games
County Championship Matches	7

Game Statistics: first-class:

Category	Information
Highest Team Score	Warwickshire (504/7dec against Derbyshire) in 1910
Lowest Team Score	Derbyshire (124 against Nottinghamshire) in 1912
Best Batting Performance	Crowther Charlesworth (216 runs for Warwickshire against Derbyshire in 1910
Best Bowling Performance	Thomas Wass (9/67 for Nottinghamshire against Derbyshire) in 1911
