= Town Ground (Heanor) =

Sports venue in Heanor, Derbyshire, England

Coordinates: 53°00′40″N 1°21′23″W

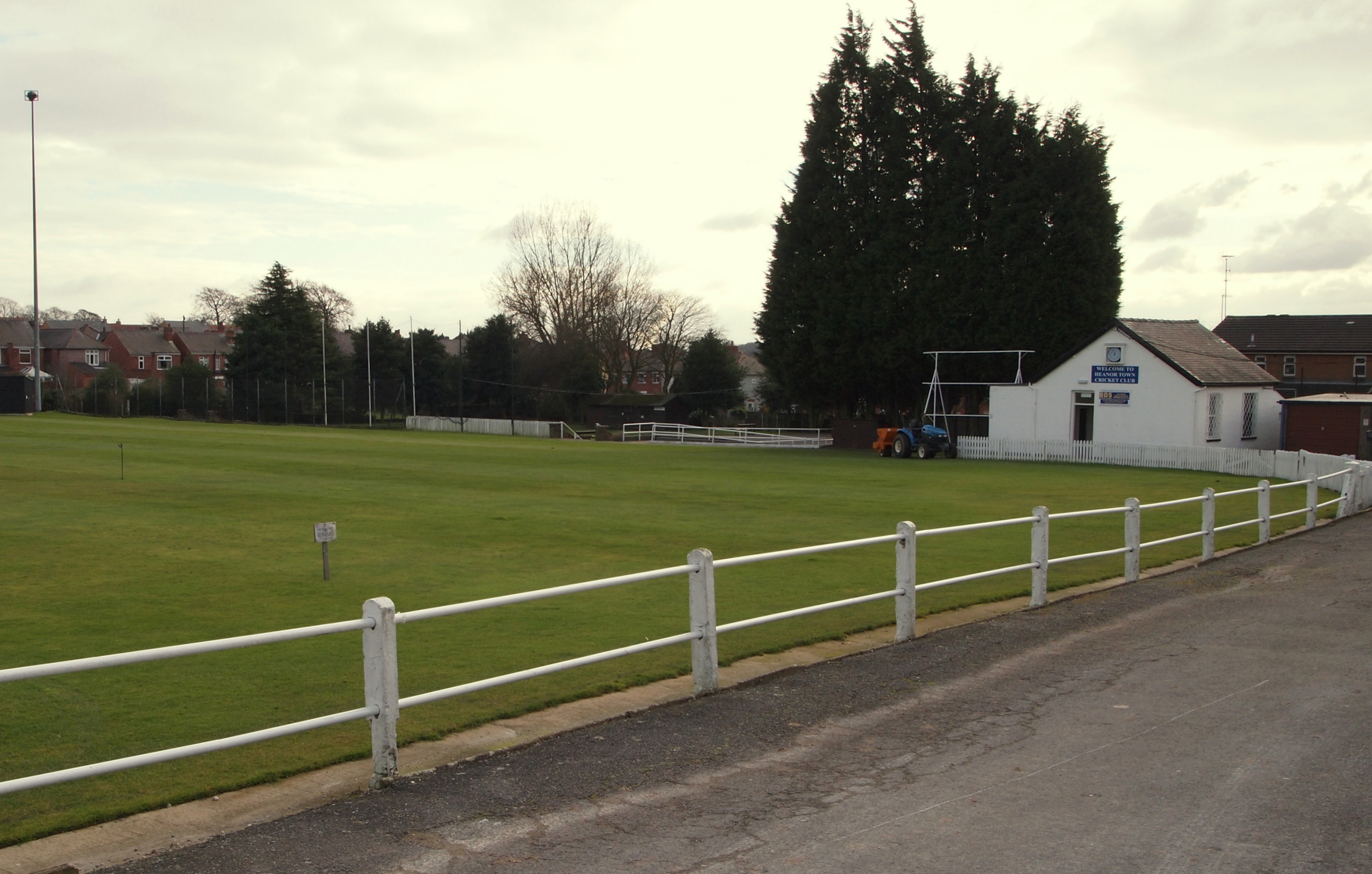
The Town Ground

The Town Ground is a cricket and football ground in the town of Heanor, Derbyshire, England. For cricket, the ground is the home of Heanor Town CC, and has also been used by Derbyshire CCC since the 1970s, mostly for limited-over matches. It has hosted five List A matches and one first-class fixture.

The Town Ground is also home to the football team, Heanor Town F.C.

Game Information:

Game Type	No. of Games
County Championship Matches	1
Limited-over county matches	8
Twenty20 matches	0

Game Statistics: first-class:

Category	Information
Highest Team Score	Hampshire (349/2 dec against Derbyshire) in 1987
Lowest Team Score	Hampshire (261/6 dec against Derbyshire) in 1987
Best Batting Performance	Bruce Roberts (106 runs for Derbyshire against Hampshire in 1987
Best Bowling Performance	Rajesh Maru (4/123 for Hampshire against Derbyshire) in 1987

Game Statistics: one-day matches:

Category	Information
Highest Team Score	Gloucestershire (258/8 in 40 overs against Derbyshire) in 1988
Lowest Team Score	Gloucestershire Cricket Board (172 in 43.3 overs against Derbyshire Cricket Board) in 2000
Best Batting Performance	Kim Barnett (100 runs for Derbyshire against Somerset) in 1983, Kim Barnett (100 runs for Derbyshire against Glamorgan) in 1989 and John Morris (100 runs for Derbyshire against Glamorgan) in 1989
Best Bowling Performance	Cardigan Connor (4/25 for Hampshire against Derbyshire) in 1986
