= Ind Coope Ground =

Cricket ground in Staffordshire, England

Coordinates: 52°49′04″N 1°38′56″W

The Ind Coope Ground was a cricket ground in Burton, England where Derbyshire CCC played between 1938 and 1980. In most years, the ground would host at least one County Championship match. Staffordshire CCC used the ground between 1987 and 1991 for NatWest Trophy and Minor Counties Championship matches.

The ground hosted 38 first-class matches and 7 List A matches.

The ground is named after the former brewing firm Ind Coope.

Game Information:

Game Type	No. of Games
County Championship Matches	35
limited-over county matches	7
Twenty20 matches	0

Game Statistics: first-class:

Category	Information
Highest Team Score	There have been no team scores of more than 500 on this ground
Lowest Team Score	Hampshire (23 against Derbyshire) in 1958
Best Batting Performance	John Langridge (184 Runs for Sussex against Derbyshire in 1950
Best Bowling Performance	George Pope (8/38 for Derbyshire against Sussex) in 1948

Game Statistics: one-day:

Category	Information
Highest Team Score	Surrey (285/9 in 60 overs against Staffordshire) in 1988
Lowest Team Score	Derbyshire (23 against Leicestershire) in 1975
Best Batting Performance	Geoff Humpage (76 Runs for Warwickshire against Staffordshire in 1987
Best Bowling Performance	Allan Donald (5/24 for Warwickshire against Staffordshire) in 1987
