= Highfield, Leek =

Cricket ground in England

Highfield
- Interactive map of Highfield

Ground information
- Location: Leek, Staffordshire
- Country: England
- Coordinates: 53.1140°N 2.0430°W
- Establishment: 1870
- Capacity: 3,000
- End names
- Pavilion End; Highfield End

Team information
Staffordshire	(1920–2016)
Derbyshire	(1986–2013)
- As of 28 August 2010; Source: Ground profile

Highfield is a cricket ground in Leek, Staffordshire. The ground is located just outside of the town along the Macclesfield Road, which itself forms part of the A523 Road. It has played host to List A and Twenty20 matches for Derbyshire County Cricket Club, in addition to playing host to Staffordshire County Cricket Club in minor counties cricket.

== History ==
In 1870, Highfield Hall was purchased by Edwin Cliffe Glover, who allowed Leek Cricket Club free use of a cricket ground on his land. Leek Cricket Club and Leek Highfield Cricket Club merged in 1919, largely due to many of their members being killed in the First World War, with Highfield serving as the home of the newly amalgamated club. Staffordshire first used the ground for minor counties matches in the 1920 Minor Counties Championship, with the ground hosting Durham. With two further minor counties matches following in 1920 and 1921, it would not be until 1957 and 1958 that Staffordshire would return to the ground. A 26 year gap followed before Staffordshire next used the ground for minor counties matches, playing there once a year until 1995. Derbyshire first used Highfield as an outground in the 1986 John Player Special League against Warwickshire. Derbyshire's use of the ground was part of an agreement with Staffordshire County Council to stage one Sunday match in Staffordshire per year, alternating between three venues. The other two venues were at Cheadle and Knypersley. Two further List A matches with Derbyshire as the home side followed in 1989 and 1992, before the Minor Counties cricket team played two 'home' matches there in the 1995 Benson & Hedges Cup against Nottinghamshire and Lancashire. Staffordshire played their final List A match there in the 2005 Cheltenham & Gloucester Trophy against Surrey, which was a narrow defeat by 3 wickets against their first-class opponents. Derbyshire later returned to the ground in 2010 and 2013, playing two one-day matches against Essex. Between these matches, Derbyshire also played a Twenty20 match at Highfield against Warwickshire in 2011. Staffordshire played Minor Counties Championship matches at Highfield until 2006, and MCCA Knockout Trophy matches there until 2016.

Highfield Hall was demolished in 1940, though a surviving building served as the clubhouse, but was located some distance from the cricket field. Therefore, a pavilion, which includes a scoreboard, was built closer to the field. The ground can hold up to 3,000 spectators, with Derbyshire's first fixture at the ground in 1986 attracting 2,500 spectators, a similar number to those who came to see Red Rum take part in a donkey derby that the ground hosted. Southwards the ground offers views to the surrounding countryside, with the playing area slightly sloping from the direction of Highfield Hall.

== Records ==
=== List A ===
- Highest team total: 321 for 5 by Derbyshire v Essex, 2013
- Lowest team total: 70 all out by Minor Counties v Lancashire, 1995
- Highest individual innings: 109 not out by Ryan ten Doeschate for Essex v Derbyshire, 2010
- Best bowling in an innings: 5-15 by Jason Gallian, for Lancashire v Minor Counties, 1995

=== Twenty20 ===
- Highest team total: 141 for 5 (18.5 overs) by Derbyshire v Warwickshire, 2011
- Lowest team total: 137 for 4 (20 overs) by Warwickshire v Derbyshire, as above
- Highest individual innings: 72 by Martin Guptill for Derbyshire v Warwickshire, as above
- Best bowling in an innings: 1-5 by Jonathan Clare, as above
