= Tean Road Sports Ground =

Cricket ground in Cheadle, England

Ground information
- Location: Cheadle, Staffordshire
- Coordinates: 52.9796°N 1.9857°W
- Establishment: 1922
- End names
- Town End; Scoreboard End

Team information
| Staffordshire | (1969–1973) |
| Derbyshire | (1987) |
- As of 31 July 2021; Source: Ground profile

Tean Road Sports Ground is a cricket ground in Cheadle, Staffordshire. The ground is located south of the town centre along the Tean Road, which itself forms part of the A522 Road. It has played host to List A cricket matches, in addition to playing host to Staffordshire County Cricket Club in minor counties cricket.

== History ==
Tean Road has been the home ground of Cheadle Cricket Club since 1922. The ground first hosted a match in county cricket when Staffordshire played Norfolk in the 1969 Minor Counties Championship. Staffordshire played one minor counties match per year at the ground until 1973. List A one-day cricket was first played at the ground in 1973, when Minor Counties North played Derbyshire in the Benson & Hedges Cup. A further one-day match was played there in 1987, with Derbyshire as the home team against Glamorgan in the Refuge Assurance League. Derbyshire's use of the ground was part of an agreement with Staffordshire County Council to stage one Sunday match in Staffordshire per year, alternating between three venues. The other two venues were at Leek and Knypersley. However, this was the only match Derbyshire played at the ground as part of the agreement. The ground has a capacity of around 4,000 for major matches.

== Records ==
=== List A ===
- Highest team total: 176 for 9 by Derbyshire v Glamorgan, 1987
- Lowest team total: 102 all out by Minor Counties North v Derbyshire, 1973
- Highest individual innings: 49 by John Morris for Derbyshire v Glamorgan, 1987
- Best bowling in an innings: 4-19 by Fred Rumsey, for Derbyshire v Minor Counties North, 1973
