= Derbyshire County Cricket Club =

English cricket club

- One Day name: Derbyshire Falcons
- Twenty20 name: Derbyshire Falcons

Personnel
- Captain: Wayne Madsen
- One Day captain: Harry Came (LA); Aneurin Donald (T20)
- Coach: Mickey Arthur
- Overseas player: Mohammad Abbas

Team information
- Founded: 1870; 156 years ago
- Home ground: The Central Co-op County Ground, Derby
- Capacity: 4,999

History
- First-class debut: Lancashire in 1871 at Old Trafford
- Championship Division One wins: 1
- Championship Division Two wins: 1
- Pro40 wins: 1
- FP Trophy wins: 1
- B&H Cup wins: 1
- Official website: www.derbyshireccc.com
First-class
One-day
T20

Derbyshire County Cricket Club is one of eighteen first-class county clubs within the domestic cricket structure of England and Wales. It represents the historic county of Derbyshire. Its limited overs team is called the Derbyshire Falcons in reference to the famous peregrine falcon which nests on the Derby Cathedral (it was previously called the Derbyshire Scorpions until 2005 and the Phantoms until 2010). Founded in 1870, the club held first-class status from its first match in 1871 until 1887. Because of poor performances and lack of fixtures in some seasons, Derbyshire then lost its status for seven seasons until it was invited into the County Championship in 1895. Derbyshire is also classified as a List A team since the beginning of limited overs cricket in 1963; and classified as a senior Twenty20 team since 2003. In recent years the club has enjoyed record attendances with over 24,000 people watching their home Twenty20 fixtures in 2017 – a record for a single campaign. The local derby versus Yorkshire at Chesterfield now regularly sells out in advance.

The club is based at the County Cricket Ground, previously known as the Racecourse Ground, in the city of Derby. In 2006, for the first time in eight years, county cricket returned to Queen's Park, Chesterfield with a County Championship game against Worcestershire and a one-day league game against Surrey. Other first-class cricket grounds used in the past have included Buxton, Saltergate in Chesterfield, Heanor, Ilkeston, Blackwell, Abbeydale Park in Sheffield, Wirksworth and Burton upon Trent (3 grounds), which is actually in neighbouring Staffordshire. One-day matches have been played at Darley Dale, Repton School, Trent College, Leek, Staffordshire and Knypersley (also in Staffordshire).

== History ==
=== Earliest cricket in Derbyshire ===
Cricket may not have reached Derbyshire until the 18th century. The earliest reference to cricket in the county is a match in September 1757 between Wirksworth and Sheffield Cricket Club at Brampton Moor, near Chesterfield.

=== Origin of club ===
An ad hoc team of players from Derbyshire travelled to Kent and London in July 1870. They played against the Gentlemen of Kent at the Angel Ground, and Marylebone Cricket Club (MCC) at Lord's, winning both matches.

Later in the year, on 4 November, Derbyshire County Cricket Club was founded. This was the outcome of a meeting in the Derby Guildhall. The Earl of Chesterfield, who had played for and against the All England Eleven, was elected as the first President. G. H. Strutt was the Vice-President, and Walter Boden, who had campaigned for the club's foundation for three years, was the Secretary. Also present at the meeting was Boden's brother, Henry. When Chesterfield died the following year, William Jervis became President.

Derbyshire's opening season was 1871. The team played its inaugural first-class match against Lancashire at Old Trafford on 26 and 27 May. In doing so, they became part of the (then unofficial) County Championship. They defeated Lancashire by an innings and 11 runs, after dismissing them for only 25 in their first innings.

=== Club history ===
Although the club had some good results in its early seasons, it struggled for the most part and before the 1888 season, following a run of disastrous results, Derbyshire was demoted from first-class status, which was then based on the number of matches against other teams of similar standing. Derbyshire recovered first-class status in 1894 and rejoined the County Championship in 1895.

Although the county then had a quite strong team due to the bowling of George Davidson, Joseph Hulme and George Porter and the batting and wicket-keeping of William Storer, William Chatterton and Bagshaw, within three years they had hit rock-bottom, going through 1897 without a win due to their best bowlers losing their powers.

From this point up to 1925, Derbyshire were perennially among the weakest counties, losing every single match in 1920 despite the efforts of Sam Cadman and Arthur Morton, persevering professionals. From 1926, the nucleus of a good team emerged around some doughty batting from Denis Smith, Stan Worthington and George Pope. Pope's bowling and that of his brother Alf, leg spinner Tommy Mitchell and seam bowler Bill Copson took the team to their one and so far only Championship victory in 1936. They won 13 of their 28 matches outright and five on first innings. Worthington, Les Townsend, Smith and Alderman all passed 1,000 runs and Copson and Mitchell took over 100 wickets, with Alf Pope taking 94. Charlie Elliott, who later became a Test umpire and selector, was another member of this team which was captained by AW Richardson.

There have been more downs than ups in post-war years. Though runs came regularly from Arnold Hamer and less consistently from the West Indian Laurie Johnson and captain Donald Carr, the batting remained the weak point right up to the beginning of covered pitches in the 1980s. However, a series of seam bowlers served England as well as Derbyshire. The list began with Copson and continued with Cliff Gladwin, Les Jackson, Harold Rhodes, Alan Ward, Mike Hendrick and, most recently, Devon Malcolm and Dominic Cork. Spin was in short supply apart from the steady work of Edwin Smith and the underrated all-rounder Geoff Miller, the former national selector of the England team and noted after-dinner speaker. The signing of Eddie Barlow, the famous South African, in 1976 and the lengthy period under the captaincy of Kim Barnett, starting in 1983, meant the side were rarely uncompetitive.

Derbyshire were crowned County Championship Division Two champions in 2012 after securing a 6-wicket victory over Hampshire on the final day of the season at the County Ground, as Karl Krikken's side won promotion after securing more wins over the course of the season than Yorkshire who also finished the campaign on 194 points.

After the conclusion of the 2013 season, Derbyshire announced a new Elite Cricket Performance model in the next phase of the club's quest for sustainable on-field success across all three domestic competitions, combined with the desire to produce England cricketers. Former Derbyshire bowler Graeme Welch was appointed the new Elite Cricket Performance Director in January 2014.

== Honours ==
- County Championship (1) – 1936

Division Two (1) – 2012

- Sunday/Pro 40/National League (1) – 1990
- Gillette/NatWest/C&G/Friends Provident Trophy (1) – 1981
- Benson & Hedges Cup (1) – 1993

== Ground history ==
This following table gives details of every venue at which Derbyshire have hosted a first-class, List A or Twenty20 match:

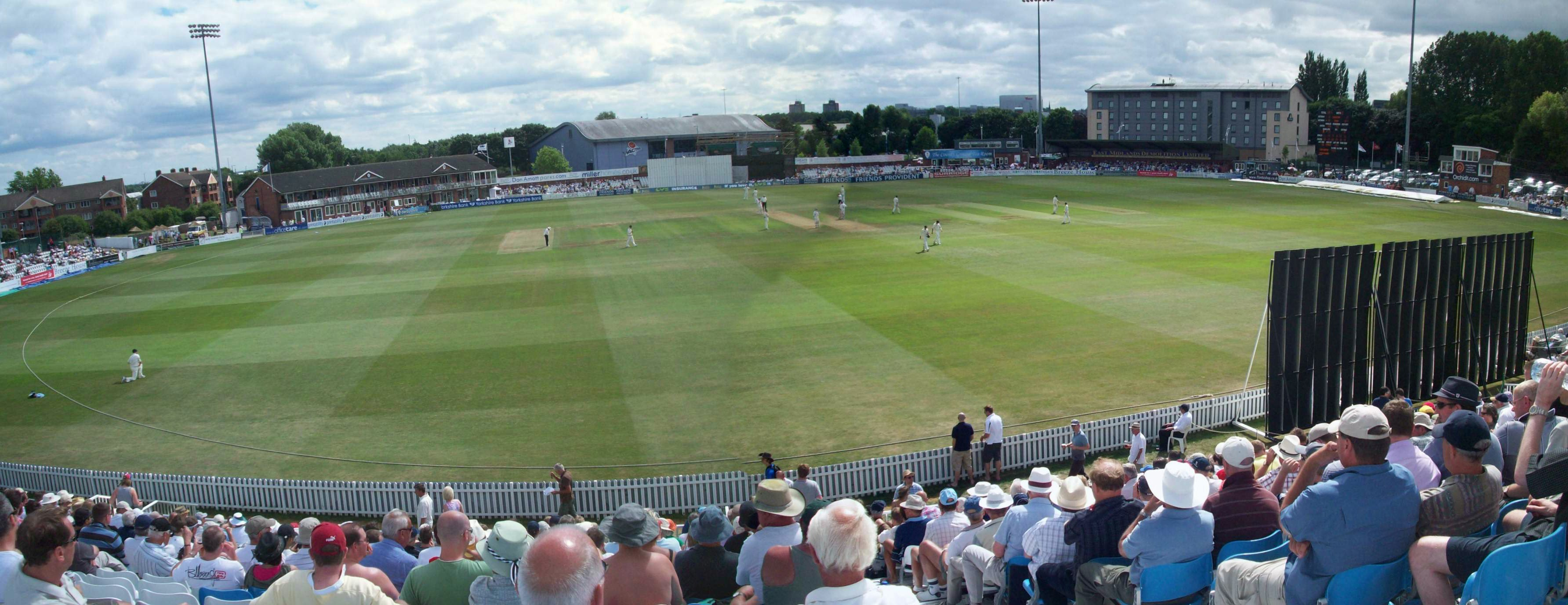
The County Ground, Derby, Derbyshire's regular home venue since 1871

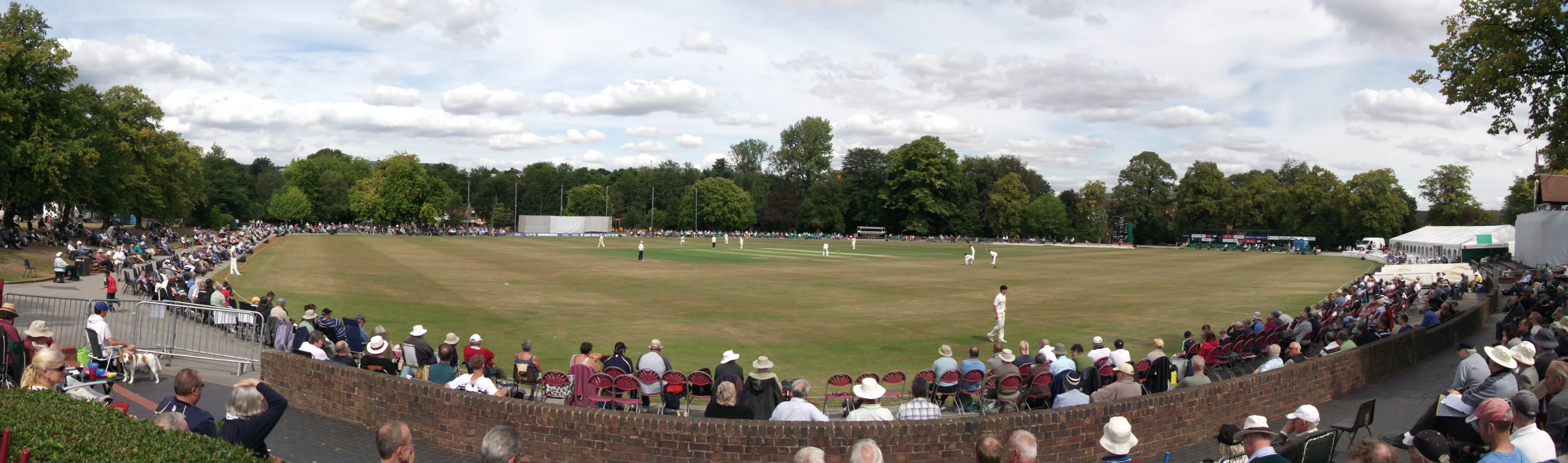
Queen's Park, Chesterfield, Derbyshire's most used outground

Name of ground	Location	Year	FC matches	LA matches	T20 matches	Total
Abbeydale Park	Sheffield	1946–1947	2	0	0	2
Bass Worthington Ground	Burton upon Trent	1975–1976	2	0	0	2
Burton-on-Trent CC Ground	Burton upon Trent	1914–1937	13	0	0	13
County Ground	Derby	1871–present	721	293	23	1037
Derby Road Ground	Wirksworth	1874	1	0	0	1
Highfield	Leek	1986–2013	0	3	1	4
Ind Coope Ground	Burton upon Trent	1938–1980	38	5	0	43
Miners Welfare Ground	Blackwell	1909–1913	7	0	0	7
North Road Ground	Glossop	1899–1910	14	0	0	14
Park Road Ground	Buxton	1923–1986	45	9	0	54
Queen's Park	Chesterfield	1898–present	396	82	2	480
Recreation Ground	Long Eaton	1887	1	0	0	1
Repton School Ground	Repton	1988	0	1	0	1
Rutland Recreation Ground	Ilkeston	1925–1994	93	16	0	109
Saltergate	Chesterfield	1874–1875	2	0	0	2
Station Road	Darley Dale	1975	0	1	0	1
Tean Road Sports Ground	Cheadle	1973–1987	0	2	0	2
Town Ground	Heanor	1991–1993	1	8	0	9
Trent College	Long Eaton	1975–1979	0	5	0	5
Tunstall Road	Knypersley	1985–1990	0	3	0	3
Uttoxeter Road	Checkley	1991–1993	0	2	0	2
Source: CricketArchive; Updated: 28 February 2010

== Players ==
=== Current squad ===
- No. denotes the player's squad number, as worn on the back of their shirt.
- ‡ denotes players with international caps.
- * denotes a player who has been awarded a county cap.

No.	Name	Nationality	Birth date	Batting style	Bowling style	Notes
Batters
4	Harry Came*	England	27 August 1998 (age 28)	Right-handed	Right-arm off break	Captain (List A)
25	Yousaf Bin Naeem	England	25 July 2006 (age 20)	Right-handed	Right-arm medium	
44	Ross Whiteley	England	13 September 1988 (age 38)	Left-handed	Left-arm medium	White ball contract
62	Amrit Basra	England	26 May 2002 (age 24)	Right-handed	Right-arm medium	
77	Wayne Madsen* ‡	Italy	2 January 1984 (age 42)	Right-handed	Right-arm off break	Club captain
All-rounders
9	Martin Andersson*	England	6 September 1996 (age 30)	Right-handed	Right-arm medium	
10	Luis Reece*	England	4 August 1990 (age 36)	Left-handed	Left-arm medium	
21	Matt Montgomery ‡	Germany	10 May 2000 (age 26)	Right-handed	Right-arm off break	
32	Zak Chappell*	England	21 August 1996 (age 30)	Right-handed	Right-arm fast-medium	
Wicket-keepers
12	Aneurin Donald ‡	England	20 December 1996 (age 29)	Right-handed	Right-arm off break	Captain (T20)
29	Brooke Guest*	England	14 May 1997 (age 29)	Right-handed	—	
Bowlers
13	Shoaib Bashir ‡	England	13 October 2003 (age 22)	Right-handed	Right-arm off break	England central contract
14	Ben Aitchison*	England	6 July 1999 (age 27)	Right-handed	Right-arm fast-medium	
16	Harry Moore	England	26 April 2007 (age 19)	Right-handed	Right-arm fast-medium	
18	Jack Morley	England	25 June 2001 (age 25)	Left-handed	Slow left-arm orthodox	
26	Nick Potts	England	17 July 2002 (age 24)	Right-handed	Right-arm fast-medium	
36	Pat Brown ‡	England	23 August 1998 (age 28)	Right-handed	Right-arm fast-medium	
38	Mohammad Abbas ‡	Pakistan	10 March 1990 (age 36)	Right-handed	Right-arm fast-medium	Overseas player
95	Rory Haydon	England	26 January 2003 (age 23)	Right-handed	Right-arm fast-medium	
Source: Updated: 27 September 2026

== Records ==
Most first-class runs for Derbyshire
Qualification – 15,000 runs

Player	Runs
Kim Barnett	23,854
Denis Smith	20,516
Derek Morgan	17,842
Leslie Townsend	17,667
Stan Worthington	17,000
Arnold Hamer	15,277

Most first-class wickets for Derbyshire
Qualification – 1,000 wickets

Player	Wickets
Les Jackson	1,670
Cliff Gladwin	1,536
Billy Bestwick	1,452
Tommy Mitchell	1,417
Derek Morgan	1,216
Edwin Smith	1,209
Bill Copson	1,033

Derbyshire recorded their highest ever score, 801 for 8 declared, against Somerset at Taunton in 2007. Their score beat their previous highest ever score of 707 for 7 declared also against Somerset at Taunton in 2005. Simon Katich scored 221, Ian Harvey 153, Ant Botha 101 and James Pipe 106. Derbyshire broke the record despite losing Phil Weston and Chris Taylor to Andy Caddick in the first over without a run on the board.

== Bibliography ==
- ACS (1982). A Guide to First-class Cricket Matches Played in the British Isles. Nottingham: ACS. OCLC 10586869.
