= Bass Worthington Ground =

Cricket ground along Derby Road in Burton upon Trent, Staffordshire

- Interactive map of Bass Worthington Ground

Ground information
- Location: Burton upon Trent, Staffordshire
- Country: England
- Coordinates: 52.8232°N 1.6245°W
- Establishment: c. 1954

Team information
Derbyshire	(1975–1976)
Staffordshire	(1975–1986)
- As of 27 January 2013; Source: Ground profile

The Bass Worthington Ground was a cricket ground located along Derby Road in Burton upon Trent, Staffordshire. The ground was bordered to the east and north by the Pirelli tyre factory.

== History ==
Originally named for the Worthington Brewery based in Burton, the first recorded match held at the ground was in 1954 when Burton-on-Trent played Derbyshire Club and Ground. The ground later played host to two first-class matches for Derbyshire against Oxford University in 1975 and Cambridge University in 1976, with Derbyshire winning both matches. Staffordshire also first played at the ground in 1975, in a Minor Counties Championship match against Durham. The county played a further seven Minor Counties Championship matches there, the last of which came against Hertfordshire. The last recorded match played there was in 1991, between the Staffordshire Cricket Association and the Yorkshire Cricket Association, after which the ground was abandoned, with just the pavilion remaining. By 2018 industrial units had been constructed on the ground. Directly to the west is the Pirelli Stadium, home ground of Burton Albion F.C.

== Records ==
=== First-class ===
- Highest team total: 335 by Derbyshire v Oxford University, 1975
- Lowest team total: 107 by Cambridge University v Derbyshire, 1976
- Highest individual innings: 151 by Brian Bolus for Derbyshire v Oxford University, 1975
- Best bowling in an innings: 8-77 by Srinivasaraghavan Venkataraghavan for Derbyshire v Oxford University, 1975
- Best bowling in a match: 10-111 by Geoff Miller for Derbyshire v Cambridge University, 1976

== See also ==
- List of cricket grounds in England and Wales
