= Checkley =

Village in Staffordshire, England

Coordinates: 52.9417°N 1.9578°W

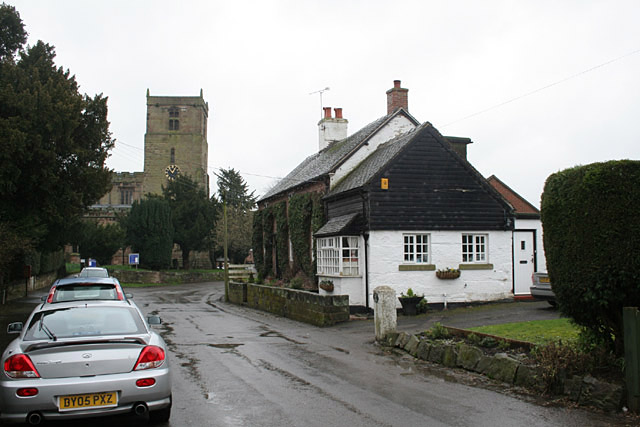
- Church Lane, Checkley

- Location within Staffordshire
- Population: 4,544 (2021)
- OS grid reference: SK028383
- District: Staffordshire Moorlands
- Shire county: Staffordshire
- Region: West Midlands
- Country: England
- Sovereign state: United Kingdom
- Post town: Stoke-on-Trent
- Postcode district: ST10
- Dialling code: 01538
- Police: Staffordshire
- Fire: Staffordshire
- Ambulance: West Midlands
- UK Parliament: Stoke-on-Trent South

Checkley is a village and civil parish in the district of Staffordshire Moorlands in the English county of Staffordshire.

== Location ==
The village is located in the valley of the River Tean and sits astride of the A522. The village is 5.0 miles (8.0 km) north west of the town of Uttoxeter and is 11.4 miles (18.3 km) south east of Stoke on Trent. The nearest railway station is at Blythe Bridge, which is 5.2 miles (8.4 km) north west of the village, or at Uttoxeter, and gives access to trains on the Crewe to Derby Line, which is also a Community rail line known as the North Staffordshire line. The A50 major trunk road from Stoke to Derby bypasses the village and runs parallel with the A522 just 0.4 miles (0.64 km) south of the village. This road opened in April 1985 and took much of the traffic away from the village.

== Population ==
The 2011 census recorded a population of 4,700 within the parish of Checkley in a total of 1,944 households. The parish comes under the Staffordshire Moorlands Non-Metropolitan District.

== Notable buildings and structures ==
The village and parish of Checkley has a variety of listed buildings and structures including a Grade I listed parish church. In total there are 58 listed structures.

=== Parish Church of Saint Mary and All Saints ===
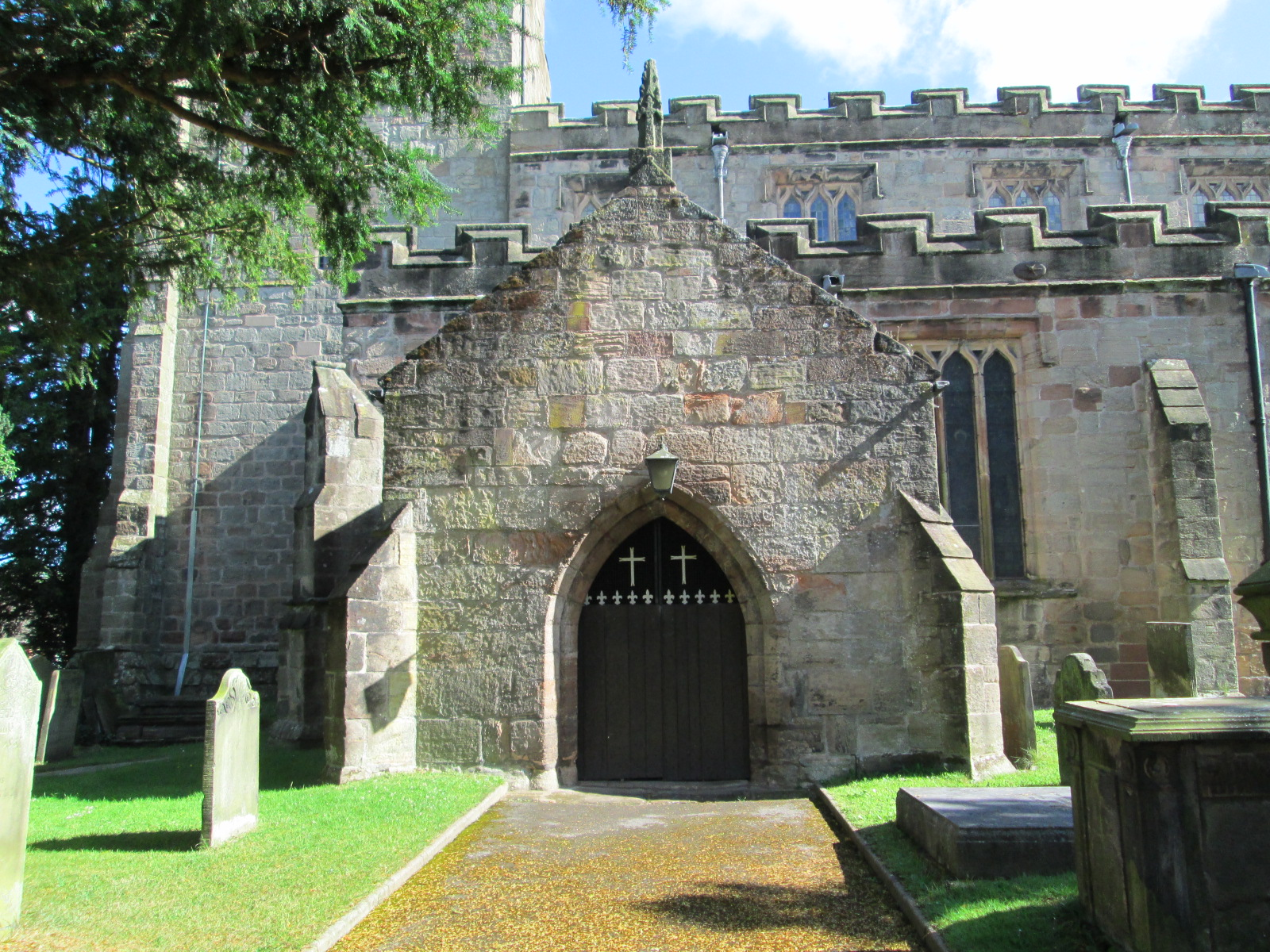
Checkley parish church

The parish church of Saint Mary and All Saints is a Grade I listed building. The earliest fabric in the church dates from the 12th century, with a south doorway of about 1300, and a chancel from the late 13th century. There were additions and alterations in the following two centuries, but the church was largely rebuilt in the 17th century. Inside the church is a Norman font with a carving of a donkey, the effigy of a knight on a memorial from the early 14th century, and some stained glass also from the 14th century. The stalls date from about 1535.

== See also ==
- Listed buildings in Checkley
- J. & N. Philips
