= Listed buildings in Uttoxeter =

Uttoxeter is a civil parish in the district of East Staffordshire, Staffordshire, England. It contains 65 buildings that are recorded in the National Heritage List for England. Of these, five are listed at Grade II*, the middle grade, and the others are at Grade II, the lowest grade. The parish contains the market town of Uttoxeter and the immediate surrounding area. Most of the listed buildings are houses and shops, the earliest of which are timber framed or have timber framed cores. Also listed are churches, chapels and associated structures, public houses and hotels, public buildings, a bridge, parts of a school, almshouses, a Friends' meeting house, a milestone and mileposts, a marker stone, a conduit or market cross, a former animal pound, a cricket pavilion, and a war memorial.

For the listed buildings in the rural area around Uttoxeter, see Listed buildings in Uttoxeter Rural.

== Key ==
Grade	Criteria
II*	Particularly important buildings of more than special interest
II	Buildings of national importance and special interest

== Buildings ==
Name and location	Photograph	Date	Notes	Grade
St Mary's Church; 52.89872°N 1.86269°W		Early 14th century	The oldest part of the church is the tower, the nave by James Trubshaw dates from 1828, and the chancel was added in 1877. The church is built in sandstone and has tile roofs, embattled parapets, and octagonal corner pinnacles. It consists of a nave, north and south aisles, north and south porches, a short chancel, and a west steeple. The steeple has a tower with angle buttresses, a hexagonal stair turret at the northwest, an embattled parapet, and a recessed spire with crockets and lucarnes. Along the sides of the aisles are two-light windows and chamfered gabled buttresses. The east window is in Decorated style.	II*
25 Market Place; 52.89774°N 1.86413°W	—	Late 14th century (probable)	A house, later a shop, with a timber framed core, refaced in brick in 1869, and with a tile roof. There are three storeys and two bays. In the ground floor is a shop front and an entry to the right. The windows in the middle floor are casements, in the top floor they are sashes, and all have wedge lintels. Inside there is exposed timber framing.	II*
Dove Bridge; 52.90752°N 1.84446°W		15th century (probable)	The bridge, now disused, was a road bridge crossing the River Dove. It is in sandstone, and consists of six arches, rising in the centre; the middle two arches are round-headed, and the others have segmental arches. The bridge has triangular cutwaters and plain parapets. The bridge is also a scheduled monument.	II*
23 Market Place; 52.89775°N 1.86403°W	—	16th century	The shop, which has been refaced and altered, has a timber framed core, it is faced in red brick, and has a hipped tile roof. There are three storeys and two bays. In the ground floor is a shop front, and the upper floors contain sash windows with wedge lintels. At the rear is some exposed timber framing, and inside is a timber-framed partition.	II
Bradley House; 52.90056°N 1.86393°W		Early 17th century	A house, later a club, it is rendered and has a moulded eaves cornice and a small parapet. There are two storeys and four bays. On the front is a 19th-century stuccoed porch with square columns, a frieze and a cornice, and the windows have stuccoed frames.	II
32–36 Carter Street; 52.89801°N 1.86682°W	—	17th century	A row of three cottages in timber framing and painted brick, with a tile roof. There are two storeys and attics, and five bays, with the ground floor of No. 36 projecting. No. 32 has a bow window, the other windows are casements, and there are four gabled dormers.	II
22 and 24 High Street; 52.89912°N 1.86523°W	—	17th century	A timber framed shop with plaster infill and a tile roof. There are two storeys and an attic, two bays, and an overall gable with bargeboards. In the ground floor is a shop front and above are casement windows.	II
School House, Alleyne's Grammar School; 52.90038°N 1.86269°W	—	17th century	The house, now part of a school, has a timber framed core, and was refronted in red brick in the 18th century. It has a moulded eaves cornice, and a slate roof with stone capped gable ends. There are two storeys and five bays. The doorway has a plain architrave and the windows are sashes, all with moulded and rusticated keyblocks.	II
Former Coach and Horses Public House; 52.89810°N 1.86666°W		17th century	The former public house is roughcast with quoins, a dentilled band, dentilled eaves, and a tile roof. There are two storeys and two bays. The doorway has a moulded surround, and the windows, which are casements, have cambered heads.	II
Former Cross Keys Hotel; 52.89906°N 1.86553°W	—	17th century	The hotel, later used for other purposes, was much restored in the 19th century. It is roughcast, with rusticated quoins, bands, and a moulded cornice. There are three storeys and attics, and three bays. The ground floor contains an arcade of seven rusticated segmental arches with keystones, a shop front recessed behind, and a flat-arched passageway on the left. In the upper floors are sash windows with rusticated lintels, and at the top are three gables.	II
Former Rural District Offices; 52.89895°N 1.86314°W	—	17th century	The building has a timber framed core, it is rendered on a plinth, and has a modillion cornice and a tile roof. There are two storeys and four bays. The windows and doorway have stone frames, and the doorway has a trefoil opening in a pointed arch.	II
The Old Star Public House; 52.89777°N 1.86387°W		17th century	The public house, which was altered and extended in the 19th and 20th centuries, has a timber framed core, with cladding and extensions in brick, and a tile roof. There are two storeys, a front of five irregular bays, a 19th-century rear wing, and a single-storey 20th-century extension. On the front is a doorway to the right and a vehicle entry on the left. The windows on the front are casements, and in the wing they are sashes. At the rear is exposed timber framing.	II
White Hart Hotel; 52.89816°N 1.86638°W	—	17th century	The hotel, which has been restored and extended, is stuccoed on a plinth, with rusticated quoins, a moulded eaves cornice, and stone capped gable ends. There are three storeys and an attic, four bays, and a two-bay two-storey extension on the right. On the front is a projecting porch with paired columns, a frieze and a dentilled cornice, and the windows are casements.	II
Friends' Meeting House; 52.89755°N 1.86693°W	—	Late 17th century	The meeting house is in red brick on a plinth, and has a moulded eaves cornice. There is one storey and three bays. The windows are on one side only, and above the double doors is a hood.	II
Vicarage; 52.89908°N 1.86219°W	—	Late 17th century	The vicarage probably has a 16th-century core. It is in red brick, with a moulded eaves cornice, and a hipped tile roof. There are two storeys and an attic, and five bays. The central doorway has a two-pane fanlight, and the windows are sashes.	II
21, 23, 25 and 25A Church Street; 52.89890°N 1.86344°W		Late 17th or early 18th century	A row of brick houses, partly rendered, with an eaves cornice and a tile roof. There are two storeys and six bays. The windows have three lights and are mullioned with casements. The doorway of No. 25 has a moulded surround with half-columns, a fanlight, and an open pediment, and the other doorways have plain surrounds and small hoods.	II
Wellington Inn; 52.90137°N 1.86595°W	—	Late 17th or early 18th century	The public house is roughcast with quoins and a tile roof. There are two storeys and four bays. The doorway has a quoined surround, and the windows are casements with cambered heads.	II
38, 40 and 42 Carter Street; 52.89792°N 1.86701°W	—	Early 18th century	A row of three houses, later shops and offices, that have been remodelled, extended and restored. They are in red brick with a tile roof, and have two storeys, four bays, and rear extensions. In the ground floor are two 19th-century shop fronts, and a doorway with a reeded surround and a cornice on brackets. The windows are sashes.	II
80 and 82 High Street; 52.90148°N 1.86598°W	—	Early 18th century	A pair of small roughcast houses on a plinth, with quoins on the left, a brick eaves cornice, and a tile roof. There are two storeys and two bays. Each house has a doorway with a plain surround, in the left house is a former shop bow window, and the other windows are sashes.	II
Jervis House; 52.90017°N 1.86233°W	—	Early to mid 18th century	A red brick house on a high stone plinth, with rusticated quoins, bands, and a moulded eaves cornice. There are three storeys and three bays. The central doorway has engaged Tuscan columns, a traceried fanlight, a frieze, and a modillion cornice. This is flanked by two-storey canted bay windows, and the window above the doorway has a pulvinated frieze and a moulded cornice. In the top floor are three lunettes.	II
90 High Street; 52.90172°N 1.86599°W	—	18th century	A red brick house with an eaves cornice and a tile roof. There are two storeys and four bays. The doorway is in the right bay and has a fanlight with Gothic tracery and a pediment, and the windows are sashes.	II
19 Market Place; 52.89793°N 1.86395°W	—	Mid 18th century	A red brick shop with a tile roof, three storeys, and two bays. In the ground floor is a modern shop front, the middle floor contains two Venetian windows, and in the top floor are sash windows.	II
21 Market Place; 52.89791°N 1.86406°W		Mid 18th century	A house, later used for other purposes, it is in red brick with rusticated stone quoins, a frieze, and a moulded cornice. There are three storeys, two bays on the front facing Market Place, and five on the right return. In the right return is a doorway with engaged Tuscan columns, a frieze and a cornice, and a doorway with a traceried fanlight. On the front facing Market Place is a modern shop front, and the windows are sashes with wedge lintels and moulded keyblocks, some of which are blocked.	II
Garden wall, Alleyne's Grammar School; 52.90052°N 1.86227°W	—	18th century	Originally the garden wall of the headmaster's house, it is in red brick with moulded stone coping.	II
Black Swan Public House; 52.89754°N 1.86437°W	—	18th century	The public house is in painted brick over earlier timber framing, with a cornice and a tile roof. There are two storeys and three bays. In the right bay is a coach entry, and the windows are sashes. There is some exposed timber framing inside the coach arch.	II
Eastfield; 52.89930°N 1.86217°W	—	18th century	A red brick house with a moulded eaves cornice and a tile roof. There are three storeys and six bays. The main doorway has a projecting porch with Tuscan columns, a frieze, a cornice, and a small parapet, and to the left is a doorway with a cornice. The windows are sashes with rusticated lintels. In front of the forecourt are cast iron railings.	II
Red Gables; 52.90074°N 1.86620°W	—	18th century	The house, which probably has an earlier core, is in red and blue chequered brick on a stone plinth, with a moulded eaves cornice, and a tile roof with stone capped gable ends. There are two storeys and four bays. The main doorway in the second bay has a rusticated surround, a rectangular fanlight, and a lintel with a large triple keyblock, and in the fourth bay is a round-headed doorway with a smaller keyblock. The windows are sashes with sills on consoles, rusticated surrounds and lintels with keyblocks.	II
The Manor House; 52.90106°N 1.86654°W		Mid 18th century	The house, which was much altered and extended in the 19th century is in red brick with stone dressings, quoins, a cornice, and a parapet with ball finials. The original part has two storeys and a front of seven bays. The middle three bays project and are canted, the central bay containing a projecting porch with Tuscan columns, a frieze, and a balustrade with ball finials. The outer bays have a large bow window on the ground floor, also with ball finials. The other windows are sashes with grooved lintels and keystones.	II*
The Vaults Public House; 52.89816°N 1.86387°W	—	Mid 18th century	The public house is in red brick with quoins, moulded eaves, and a tile roof with stone capped gabled ends. There are three storeys and two bays. In the ground floor is a projecting inn front with a slate roof, and the upper floors contain two-light casement windows with moulded keyblocks.	II
23 and 25 Balance Street; 52.89685°N 1.86530°W	—	Late 18th century	A pair of red brick houses, each with three storeys. No. 23 has four bays, and contains a doorway with a plain surround and a rectangular fanlight. No. 25 has two bays, a moulded eaves cornice, and a doorway with a semicircular fanlight. The windows in both houses are sashes.	II
38 Balance Street; 52.89682°N 1.86655°W	—	Late 18th century	A red brick house with a stuccoed band, a cornice and a slate roof. There are two storeys and an attic, and three bays, the middle bay projecting under a moulded pediment. In the centre is a doorway with engaged columns, a traceried fanlight, and an open pediment. The windows are sashes, and each window has an openwork iron window basket; the windows in the middle bay are blocked.	II
53 and 55 Balance Street; 52.89663°N 1.86688°W	—	Late 18th century	A pair of red brick houses with tile roofs. No. 53 has two storeys and an attic, and three bays under a pediment. In the right bay is a doorway with engaged columns, a semicircular fanlight, a frieze, and a dentilled pediment. The windows are sashes, and each window has a cast iron basket. Above the upper floor windows are stuccoed plaques with a swag ornament. No. 55 to the right is a two-storey 19th-century wing with dentilled eaves. It has a mullioned and transomed window in the ground floor, and a sash window with a cambered head above.	II
10 High Street; 52.89877°N 1.86500°W	—	Late 18th century	A shop in painted brick with coved eaves and a tile roof. There are three storeys and two bays. In the ground floor is a modern shop front, and the upper floors contain sash windows with channelled lintels and keyblocks.	II
23 High Street; 52.89950°N 1.86566°W	—	Late 18th century	A red brick house on a stone plinth, later used for other purposes, with a moulded eaves cornice. There are three storeys and three bays. In the ground floor to the right is a doorway with a moulded surround, and the windows are sashes with channelled lintels and keyblocks.	II
92 High Street; 52.90181°N 1.86600°W	—	Late 18th century	A red brick house with a tile roof, three storeys, and three bays. In the right bay is a Tuscan doorcase with three-quarter columns, a frieze, and a cornice, and a doorway with a traceried fanlight. The windows are sashes with cambered heads.	II
Bank House; 52.89902°N 1.86284°W		Late 18th century	A red brick house, later used for other purposes, it has bands and a modillion cornice. There are three storeys and five bays, the central three bays projecting slightly under a pediment surmounted by three urns. Steps lead up to the central porch that has engaged Tuscan columns and an ornamental frieze, and a doorway with a moulded surround and a semicircular traceried fanlight. The windows are sashes, those in the middle three bays having moulded architraves, and the window above the porch also with a pediment on consoles.	II*
Milestone northwest of The Manor House; 52.90089°N 1.86624°W		Late 18th century (probable)	The milestone is set into the front garden wall of The Manor House. Its inscription is weathered, and what is legible indicates the distances in miles to London, Liverpool, Newcastle-under-Lyme, and Uttoxeter.	II
Old Pound; 52.89022°N 1.88269°W		Late 18th century (probable)	The former animal pound consists of twelve rough-hewn tapered stone posts each with sockets which housed four rails. They stand on each side of a square enclosure.	II
Old Uttoxeter Hall; 52.90107°N 1.86257°W	—	Late 18th century	The hall, now incorporated in a school, is roughcast with stone dressings, quoins, bands, moulded eaves and a slate roof. There are two storeys, attics and a basement. In the centre is a gabled porch with a rusticated surround, a segmental-arched head with a keyblock, a moulded frieze and a cornice, and the doorway has a fanlight. The windows are sashes with moulded architraves and cambered heads.	II
84–88 High Street; 52.90159°N 1.86594°W	—	Late 18th or early 19th century	A row of three red brick houses with a tile roof, three storeys and three bays. Each doorway has a reeded architrave, a rectangular fanlight, and a small hood. The windows are sashes with rusticated stone lintels.	II
33 and 35 Market Place; 52.89789°N 1.86442°W	—	Late 18th or early 19th century	The building is in painted brick with corbelled eaves and a tile roof. There are three storeys and four bays. In the ground floor is a shop front, and the upper floors contain sash windows.	II
Methodist Chapel; 52.90027°N 1.86627°W	—	1812	The chapel is in red brick with a stuccoed band and a slate roof. The gabled front has two storeys and three bays, and in the middle bay is a two-storey arch. The central doorway has Tuscan half-columns and a pediment. The windows in the ground floor have flat heads, and those in the upper floor have round heads.	II
15–19 Bridge Street; 52.89786°N 1.86264°W	—	Early 19th century	A row of three red brick houses with dentilled eaves and a tile roof. There are two storeys and four bays. No. 17 has a bow window, and the other windows are casements with mullions and segmental heads. There are three doorways and a narrower passage doorway to the left, all with segmental heads.	II
39 Carter Street; 52.89775°N 1.86708°W	—	Early 19th century	The house was originally the caretaker's house for the Friends' Meeting House. It has an early 17th-century core, and is in red brick with dentilled eaves and a tile roof. There are two storeys, two bays, and later rear extensions. Steps with handrails lead up to a doorway on the right that has a gabled hood on brackets, and the windows are casements.	II
27 Market Place; 52.89771°N 1.86424°W	—	Early 19th century	A shop with possibly a medieval timber framed core. It is in brick with a moulded eaves cornice and a Welsh slate roof, three storeys and two bays. In the ground floor is a modern shop front, and above are sash windows with wedge lintels.	II
74 High Street; 52.90101°N 1.86580°W	—	Early 19th century	A red brick house on a stone plinth, with a moulded band, and a hipped slate roof. There are two storeys and three bays. In the centre is a stone porch with paired pilasters and a cornice hood. The windows are sashes in moulded architraves, the window above the porch with a cornice hood on consoles.	II
Conduit or Market Cross; 52.89811°N 1.86435°W		Early 19th century	The building stands in Market Place, it is in freestone, and in Classical style. It is in the form of a cube with each face having an arched recess under a dentilled pediment supported on pilasters. On the top is a square plinth with a domed top surmounted by a cast iron lamp bracket. On the west side is a bas-relief depicting Dr Johnson.	II
Police Station; 52.89691°N 1.86569°W	—	Early 19th century	The police station is in red brick on a stuccoed plinth, with a band, a cornice, a parapet, and a tile roof. There are two storeys and three bays, the middle bay projecting twice. The central doorway has engaged columns, a frieze, and a cornice, and the windows are sashes.	II
Marker stone 52.90045°N 1.86468°W		Early 19th century (probable)	The marker stone is to the left of the former St Mary's School. It consists of a tall slate slab with an inscription relating to the end of the Derby Road.	II
Milepost at SK0708935315; 52.91523°N 1.89597°W		Early 19th century	The milepost is on the southwest side of the A522 road. It is in cast iron with a triangular plan, a cambered top and a back plate. On the top is inscribed "UTTOXETER PARISH", on the back plate are the distances in miles to London and to Liverpool, and on the sides are the distances to Uttoxeter and to Newcastle-under-Lyme.	II
Milepost 1 mile from Uttoxeter; 52.90710°N 1.87593°W		Early 19th century	The milepost is on the south side of the A522 road. It is in cast iron with a triangular plan, a cambered top and a back plate. On the top is inscribed "UTTOXETER PARISH", on the back plate are the distances in miles to London and to Liverpool, and on the sides are the distances to Uttoxeter and to Newcastle-under-Lyme.	II
Wheatsheaf Inn; 52.89807°N 1.86257°W	—	Early 19th century	The public house has an earlier timber frame and is roughcast, with quoins and a parapet that is upswept in the centre. There are two storeys and an attic and three bays. The doorway has a stuccoed surround with panelled pilasters, and a cornice hood on decorative consoles. In the upper floor are casement windows and the ground floor windows are replacements.	II
Congregational Church; 52.89792°N 1.86554°W	—	1827–28	The church is in red brick. The entrance front has a stuccoed band, a moulded cornice, and a small parapet. There are three bays, with a pediment over the middle bay, which projects slightly. The porch has Tuscan columns, a plain frieze and a cornice.	II
St Mary's Roman Catholic Church, presbytery, wall and gate piers 52.89682°N 1.86478°W	—	1839	The church was designed by A. W. N. Pugin, altered and extended in 1879 by Peter Paul Pugin, and again in 1912–13. The church and presbytery are built in red brick with sandstone dressings and tile roofs, and the narthex is in sandstone. The church consists of a nave with a narthex, north and south aisles, a chancel with an organ chamber, a Lady chapel, and a sacristy. The narthex has three bays and a gable with a niche containing a statue. At the west end of the nave is a rose window with an oculus above, and a bellcote on the gable apex. The presbytery to the left has two storeys and an attic, and on the front facing the road is a two-storey canted bay window. To the east of the church are two square sandstone gate piers surmounted by a fleur-de-lys motif, and in front of the presbytery is a low brick wall with stone capping and iron railings.	II
Laythropp's Almshouses; 52.89712°N 1.86761°W		1849	The almshouses are in red brick and have three gables. The central doorway has a four-centred arch, above it is an inscribed plaque, and the windows have stone frames and mullions.	II
9 High Street; 52.89876°N 1.86527°W	—	Mid 19th century	A red brick shop with a modillion eaves cornice and a parapet with panels of balusters. There are two storeys and three bays. In the ground floor is a 19th-century shop front, in the centre of the upper floor is a Venetian window with moulded cornices, and the outer windows are sashes.	II
31 Market Place; 52.89793°N 1.86450°W	—	19th century	A red brick gabled shop with two storeys and two bays. In the ground floor is a shop front, above are sash windows, and in the passageway to the left is exposed timber framing.	II
2 Market Street; 52.89762°N 1.86442°W	—	19th century	A shop with a brick front over timber framing, with a tile roof. There are two storeys and an attic, and two bays. In the ground floor are a shop front and a doorway to the left with pilasters, all under a plain frieze and a moulded cornice. The windows are casements, there are two gabled dormers, and in the passage to the right is exposed timber framing.	II
Milepost; 52.89064°N 1.88174°W		19th century	The milepost is on the south side of the A518 road. It is in cast iron with a triangular plan, and a cambered top. On the top is inscribed "UTTOXETER", on the base is the name of the manufacturer, and on the sides are the distances to Abbots Bromley, Weston, Handsacre, Stafford, Lichfield, and Uttoxeter.	II
The Old Talbot Inn; 52.89806°N 1.86455°W	—	19th century	The public house, which incorporates earlier timber framing, is in painted brick with a tile roof. There are two storeys and an attic, a front of two bays, and a gabled wing to the right. The ground floor projects forward, and to the left is a doorway with a moulded surround.	II
Town Hall; 52.89918°N 1.86559°W		1853–54	The town hall is in red brick on a plinth, with sandstone dressings, quoins, bands, a cornice, and a Welsh slate roof. It is in Classical style, and has two storeys and five bays, the outer bays projecting and pedimented, and across the rear is the assembly room. In the centre is a projecting porch with square columns and an openwork metal balustrade, and in the right bay is a vehicle entrance with a segmental arch. Above the porch is a tripartite window, and the other windows are sashes with stone surrounds, segmental heads, and transoms.	II
Cemetery Chapels; 52.89415°N 1.87249°W	—	c. 1870	The chapels are in stone with slate roofs, and are in Gothic style. There are two small chapels linked by an archway that is surmounted by an octagonal tower and a spire.	II
1 Market Street; 52.89793°N 1.86407°W		1893	A shop on a corner site in stone in French Renaissance style with detailed carving. There are three storeys and an attic, with moulded pilasters at the sides rising to obelisk finials. In the ground floor is a shop window with a four-centred arched head, above it is a mullioned and transomed window, and the windows in the top floor and the gabled attic are mullioned. Between the floors are dentilled bands and carved friezes. The doorway is on the corner, above which is a two-storey bay window and an octagonal turret surmounted by a cupola and a weathervane.	II
Cricket Pavilion, Oldfields Sports Ground; 52.90067°N 1.87299°W	—	1904	The cricket pavilion is in brick with applied timber framing that has roughcast panels consisting of broken glass, and a tile roof. There is a single-storey range with a verandah at the front, a balcony above with a balustrade, and flanking square two-storey pavilions with hipped roofs. The windows are sashes, and at the rear are single-story extensions.	II
War memorial 52.89819°N 1.86296°W		c. 1928	The war memorial stands in Market Place, and is in Hollington stone. It has an octagonal plan, it is in Perpendicular style, and is in the form of an Eleanor Cross. There is a base of four steps, the memorial has four stages, and it is surmounted by a carved cross. On the memorial are bronze plaques with inscriptions relating to the two World Wars and to subsequent conflicts.	II
