= The Heath, Staffordshire =

Village near Uttoxeter in Staffordshire, England

Coordinates: 52.905°N 1.872°W

The Heath
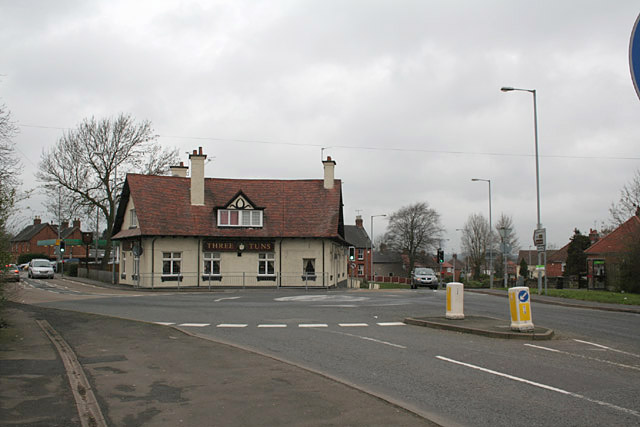
- Three Tuns Public House

- Location within Staffordshire
- Area: 1.34 km^{2} (0.52 sq mi)
- Population: 6,049 (2001)
  - Density: 4,514/km^{2} (11,690/sq mi)
- OS grid reference: SK0933
  - London: 121 mi (195 km) SE
- Civil parish: Uttoxeter
- District: East Staffordshire
- Shire county: Staffordshire
- Region: West Midlands
- Country: England
- Sovereign state: United Kingdom
- Post town: UTTOXETER
- Postcode district: ST14
- Dialling code: 01889
- Police: Staffordshire
- Fire: Staffordshire
- Ambulance: West Midlands
- UK Parliament: Burton

The Heath is a village in the East Staffordshire borough of Staffordshire, England. It is close to the border with Derbyshire. The village adjoins the town of Uttoxeter and the villages of Bramshall and Spath.

== History ==
The Uttoxeter Canal previously terminated in The Heath; it was completed in 1811 and closed in 1849. The area around the canal basin is now known as The Wharf.

The Heath became a village in 1880 when the church opened.

Until the 1950s The Heath and Uttoxeter were two separate settlements. The Heath had a church, a school and several houses. Uttoxeter Heath Windmill was a feature in the area until the 1920s.

== Geography ==
=== Geology and topography ===
The Heath is 345 feet (105 m) above sea level and is built on a slight hill. The River Tean runs to the North of the village and the River Dove runs close by to the east. To the east of the Village there is a Dismantled Railway line which there is still evidence of.

=== Boundaries ===
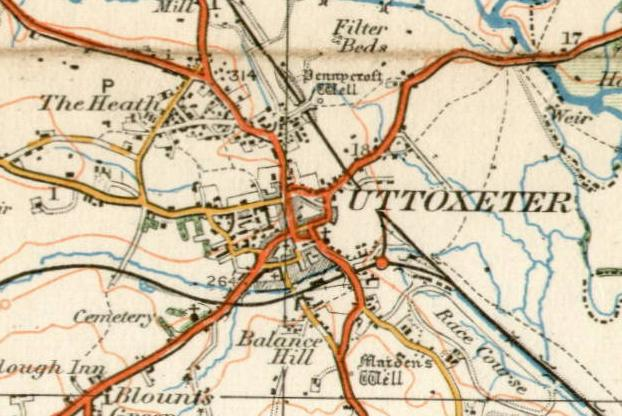
A 1921 Ordnance Survey map showing The Heath and Uttoxeter

The Heath has no specific boundaries; the most widely accepted ones are the A50 to the North, Park Street to the East, Heath Road, Holly Road and Bramshall road to the South and the West is marked by the end of the housing estate, though the boundaries to the village are not specific and often change. This covers an area of approximately 1.34 square kilometres (0.52 mi^{2}). The original boundaries were in a triangular shape with Heath Road to the South, Ashbourne Road to the North East and the end of Holly Road to the North West, covering an area of 27 hectares (66.72 acres).

=== Region ===
Officially The Heath is part of the West Midlands Region however as with much with East Staffordshire it is sometimes included as part of the East Midlands such as before 1990 it was served by East Midlands Electricity and the East Midlands Gas Board.

=== Climate ===
Climate data for Staffordshire (1971–2000 averages)
Month	Jan	Feb	Mar	Apr	May	Jun	Jul	Aug	Sep	Oct	Nov	Dec	Year
Mean daily maximum °C (°F)	6.5 (43.7)	6.9 (44.4)	9.5 (49.1)	12 (54)	15.7 (60.3)	18.4 (65.1)	21.1 (70.0)	20.8 (69.4)	17.5 (63.5)	13.5 (56.3)	9.5 (49.1)	7.5 (45.5)	13.3 (55.9)
Mean daily minimum °C (°F)	1 (34)	1 (34)	2.5 (36.5)	3.5 (38.3)	6.2 (43.2)	8.9 (48.0)	11.1 (52.0)	10.9 (51.6)	9 (48)	6.4 (43.5)	3.3 (37.9)	1.8 (35.2)	5.5 (41.9)
Average rainfall mm (inches)	62.7 (2.47)	44.4 (1.75)	51.2 (2.02)	48.5 (1.91)	52.7 (2.07)	59.3 (2.33)	46.7 (1.84)	57.7 (2.27)	63.6 (2.50)	60.5 (2.38)	62 (2.4)	66.8 (2.63)	676 (26.6)

== Name ==
As the name suggests The Heath is likely to mean an area of heathland to the north of Uttoxeter. The heathland today has long since gone. As the word Heath is a common place name it is often referred to as The Heath, Uttoxeter to avoid confusion.

== Demographics ==
According to the 2001 Census the population for Heath Ward 6,049.

In the ward over 97% of people (5,931) describe themselves as White British with just 174 from an ethnic minority. there are 2,934 Males and 3,115 Females in the ward.

== Governance ==
The village is part of the Uttoxeter civil parish.

The village is covered by East Staffordshire and has its own ward named Heath Ward and is represented by the Conservative Geoffrey Morrison and Howard Grigg, some of the Heath however falls into the town ward.

It is part of the Burton constituency in the House of Commons. In the European Parliament, it was part of the West Midlands constituency which was represented by six MEPs.

== Public services ==
There is a medium-sized refuse site (tip) and recycling centre operated by East Staffordshire Borough Council waste collection services are also provided by East Staffordshire Borough Council. Water and sewage services are provided by South Staffordshire Water and Uttoxeter Sewage Treatment Works is located on the edge of The Heath. The Distribution network operator for electricity is Central Networks, better known as E.ON UK.

The Heath uses the Stoke-On-Trent (ST) postcode and the postal town is Uttoxeter (ST14). There is a small sub-post office inside the Londis store. The nearest library is in Uttoxeter.

The Heath is part of Staffordshire Police, Staffordshire Fire and Rescue Service and West Midlands Ambulance Service areas. Uttoxeter Fire Station is located within The Heath and the nearest police station in Uttoxeter.

== Economy ==
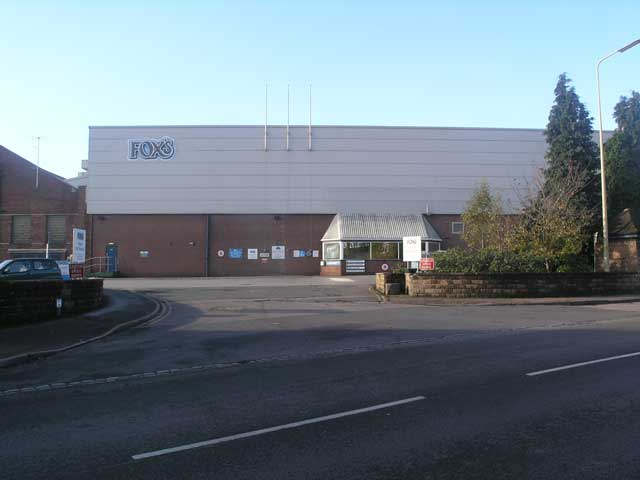
Fox's Biscuits in The Heath

Fox's Biscuits (previously Elkes) has a large factory in the village employing around 900 people. The other major employer in the area is JCB based in nearby Rocester and has its Heavy Products and World Parts Centre at the edge of the village.

There are two shopping area in the village one on New Road which has a Tesco Express, takeaway and a motor components store. The other one is known locally as The Five Shops and is on Windsor Road, it has a chip shop, hair salon, bakers and a Londis with a small post office.

== Health ==
The Heath lies in the South Staffordshire NHS Trust area. The two GP surgeries in the area are Northgate Surgery and Balance Street Health center are both in Uttoxeter. The nearest hospital is Queens Hospital in Burton Upon Trent. It has an Accident and Emergency Department, and out of hours GPs are also based at Queens Hospital. Other hospitals in the area include University Hospital of North Staffordshire in Stoke-on-Trent and County Hospital in Stafford.

According to the 2001 census 4,145 described their health as good, 1,448 described their health as fairly good and 456 described their health as not good. During the period from April 2007 to March 2008 there were 1,245 hospital admissions regarding people from The Heath, and the biggest reason for admission was cancer.

== Education ==
The Heath has a middle school system and two of Uttoxeter's first schools lies in The Heath, named Tynsel Parkes First School and St Mary's Cofe School. The two middle schools in the area are called Windsor Park C.E. Middle School and Oldfields Hall Middle School which are both in Uttoxeter. Students in the area attend Thomas Alleyne's High School also in Uttoxeter.

=== St Mary's CofE First School ===
The largest primary school in The Heath is called St Mary's CofE First School, it is a Church of England first school dating from 1907 and is on Holly Road in the village.

=== Tynsel Parkes CE First School ===
The other primary school is Tynsel Parkes CE First School which is also a Church of England first school and is on School Road. The school dates from the 1960s.

== Religion ==
According to the 2001 census 86% described themselves as Christian, 8.2% as non-religious and 5.8% as Other. The Heath lies in the Church of England parish of Uttoxeter and the Roman Catholic parish of St Mary, Uttoxeter, the nearest Catholic church is St. Mary's Catholic Church in Uttoxeter.

=== Heath Mission Church ===
The only place of worship in The Heath is a Church of England church that dates from 1880 that is part of the Parish of Uttoxeter along with St. Mary the Virgin Church in Uttoxeter Town Centre.

== Culture and recreation ==
The Heath has its own village hall which is called Uttoxeter Heath Community Centre which is on Holly Road, this has recently undergone a half million pound refit funded by the lottery, this centre is largely run by local volunteers with direction from a three strong management team. There is also a public house in the village called The Three Tuns. There are two takeaways in the village but no restaurants.

There are two large parks in the village, one being Bramshall Road Park which has a bowling green, large play area, two tennis courts, a football pitch, basketball court and skate park. The other is Pennycroft Community Park which has small play area, two football pitches and a basketball court. The nearest leisure facilities are both in Uttoxeter, the nearest cinema and bowling alley are also in Uttoxeter.

== Transport ==
The A50 road runs adjacent to The Heath and is the main Stoke-on-Trent to Derby Road.

The village has numerous bus stops going towards Uttoxeter, Stoke-on-Trent, Burton-on-Trent and Ashbourne.

The nearest railway station is Uttoxeter.

The nearest airports are East Midlands (22 miles) and Birmingham (31 miles).

== Media ==
The local newspapers covering The Heath are The Uttoxeter Advertiser and The Uttoxeter Post and Times; a wider area scale there is the Staffordshire Newsletter.

The Heath Receives both BBC West Midlands and BBC East Midlands, plus ITV Central television. The local BBC radio station in the area is BBC Radio Derby. Independent local radio includes Capital Mid-Counties, Hits Radio Staffordshire & Cheshire and Capital Midlands.
