= William de Shepesheved =

English chronicler and Cistercian monk (c.1270–c.1339)

William de Shepesheved (c. 1270–c. 1339) was an English chronicler and Cistercian monk.

== Life ==
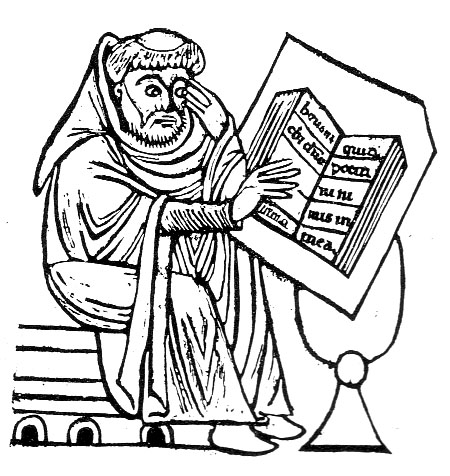
A Cistercian monk

William de Shepesheved presumably took his name from Shepshed in Leicestershire. He was a monk of the Cistercian house of Crokesden, Staffordshire. He wrote a list of the names of the monks of the house and chronicles of English history from 1066 down to 1320. These are extant in manuscript.

== See also ==
- Croxden Abbey

== Sources ==
- Summerson, Henry (2021). "Shepesheved, William (c. 1270–c. 1339)". Oxford Dictionary of National Biography (online ed.). Oxford University Press. doi:10.1093/ref:odnb/25327. (Subscription or UK public library membership required.)

Attribution:

- This article incorporates text from a publication now in the public domain: Bateson, Mary (1897). "Shepesheved, William de". In Lee, Sidney (ed.). Dictionary of National Biography. Vol. 52. London: Smith, Elder & Co. p. 51.
