= Listed buildings in Kingstone, Staffordshire =

Kingstone is a civil parish in the district of East Staffordshire, Staffordshire, England. It contains 13 buildings that are recorded in the National Heritage List for England. Of these, one is at Grade II*, the middle grade, and the others are at Grade II, the lowest grade. The parish contains the villages of Kingstone and Gratwich, and is otherwise rural. The listed buildings consist of houses, farmhouses, churches, a former mill, and mileposts.

== Key ==
Grade	Criteria
II*	Particularly important buildings of more than special interest
II	Buildings of national importance and special interest

== Buildings ==
Name and location	Photograph	Date	Notes	Grade
St Mary's Church; 52.88276°N 1.95782°W		16th century	The oldest part of the church is the chancel with the rest of the church rebuilt in 1775. It is in Gothic style, and built in red brick with stone dressings and a tile roof. The church consists of a nave, a south porch, and a chancel. On the west gable end is an open gabled bellcote.	II
Callowhill Hall; 52.83493°N 1.92750°W		Late 16th to early 17th century	A house that was extended later in the 17th century. The original part is timber framed on a high brick plinth with stone dressings and a tile roof. It has two storeys, an attic and a basement, and a front of three bays, the central bay with a projecting two-storey gabled porch approached by steps with an elaborately carved parapet. The windows are casements, apart from a mullioned basement window. At the rear is a two-storey brick extension with a floor band, mullioned and transomed windows in the ground floor and casements above, and there is a two-storey brick link containing a doorway approached by steps.	II*
Blythebridge Mill House; 52.85573°N 1.93249°W	—	17th century	The house has been altered and extended. The early part is timber framed, the additions are in brick and the roof is tiled. The early part has two storeys and an attic, two bays, a stair windows and casement windows. There is a lower two-storey extension. Inside is an inglenook fireplace with a moulded bressumer.	II
Manor Farmhouse, Leese Hill; 52.87110°N 1.92712°W	—	17th century	The farmhouse was later extended, the original part is timber framed, the additions are in brick and the roof is tiled. The original house has an L-shaped plan with a two-bay main range and a projecting wing. Two parallel gabled ranges of unequal length with ball finials and chamfered quoins were added in the 18th century, and there were further extensions in the 19th century. Most of the windows are casements.	II
Manor Farmhouse, Kingstone; 52.86509°N 1.91205°W	—	17th century	The farmhouse is timber framed with painted brick infill, it is partly rebuilt in timber and brick, and has a tile roof. There is a T-shaped plan, with a two-bay hall range, a two-bay gabled cross-wing, and a single-storey lean-to extension in the angle. The hall range has one storey and an attic, with a central brick gabled porch and an ogee-headed doorway, and the cross-wing has two storeys and an attic. The windows are casements.	II
Wanfield Hall; 52.86002°N 1.92939°W	—	17th century	The house, which was later extended, is pebbledashed over timber framing and brick, and has a tile roof with coped verges and finials. There are two storeys and an attic, and two gabled bays. The doorway is round-headed, and the windows are casements, most with segmental heads.	II
Walnut House; 52.86494°N 1.91175°W	—	Late 18th century	A red brick house with a dentilled eaves course and a tile roof. There are two storeys and an attic, and three bays. On the front is a gabled porch, and the windows are casements with segmental heads. In the west gable is a dentilled brick band.	II
Blythebridge Mill; 52.85585°N 1.93272°W	—	1823	The former mill is in red brick with a tile roof, and is in Gothic style. The main block has three storeys and three bays, flanked by two two-storey single-bay wings. The windows and the doorways in the lower two floors have pointed heads and hood moulds, in the top floor the windows have quatrefoil heads, the middle window is blind and contains a coat of arms.	II
Gate piers, steps and walls, Callowhill Hall; 52.83500°N 1.92712°W	—	Early 19th century (probable)	All in stone, the steps are flanked by square gate piers with ball finials. The walls slope down for 3 yards (2.7 m) to former end piers, and then on for a further 10 yards (9.1 m). The extensions incorporate 17th-century carved masonry.	II
Milepost; 52.87197°N 1.92283°W	—	19th century	The milepost is on the north side of Watery Lane. It is in cast iron with a triangular plan and a cambered top. On the top is inscribed "UTTOXETER" and on the sides are the distances to Uttoxeter, Weston, and Stafford.	II
St John's Church; 52.86280°N 1.91160°W		1860–61	The church was designed by David Brandon, and the south aisle was added by G. E. Street. It is built in stone with a tile roof, and consists of a nave, a north porch, a south aisle, a chancel with a canted east end, a southeast vestry and a northwest steeple. The steeple has a tower of three stages with angle buttresses, and a broach spire.	II
Milepost at NGR SK 04183059; 52.87282°N 1.93938°W		Mid to late 19th century	The milepost is on the east side of the A518 road. It is in cast iron with a triangular plan and a cambered top. On the top is inscribed "GRATWICH" and on the sides are the distances to Uttoxeter, Weston, and Stafford.	II
Milepost at NGR SK 07312965; 52.86440°N 1.89277°W		Mid to late 19th century	The milepost is on the west side of the B5013 road. It is in cast iron with a triangular plan and a cambered top. On the top is inscribed "UTTOXETER" and on the sides are the distances to Abbots Bromley, Uttoxeter, Handsacre, Burton upon Trent, and Lichfield.	II
