= Vincent Blore =

English footballer

Personal information
- Date of birth: 25 February 1907
- Place of birth: The Heath, Staffordshire, England
- Date of death: 1 January 1997 (aged 89)
- Place of death: Epsom, Surrey, England
- Height: 5 ft 11 1/2 in (1.82 m)
- Position: Goalkeeper

Senior career*
Years	Team	Apps	(Gls)
- Uttoxeter Amateurs
?–1932	Burton Town		
1932–1933	Aston Villa	0	(0)
1933–1935	Derby County	15	(0)
1935–1936	West Ham United	9	(0)
1936–1938	Crystal Palace	33	(0)
1938–?	Exeter City		
- * Club domestic league appearances and goals

Vincent Blore (25 February 1907 – 1 January 1997), was an English footballer who played as a goalkeeper for Uttoxeter Amateurs, Burton Town, Aston Villa, Derby County, West Ham United, Crystal Palace and Exeter City.

== Footballing career ==
Blore played for Uttoxeter Amateurs, Burton Town and Aston Villa before moving to Derby County in August 1933. He made his debut for Derby on 19 August 1934 in a 2–0 away defeat to Leicester City. Blore made only 15 appearances before moving to West Ham in 1935. Known as "Vic" by West Ham fans, he was signed by manager, Charlie Paynter. His debut came on 31 August 1935 in a 4–3 away defeat to Norwich City. 'Keeper Herman Conway arrived later that season making Blore second-choice and with the arrival of Jack Weare from Wolverhampton Wanderers he became third choice 'keeper. In 1936, Crystal Palace offered him regular first team football. He played for Palace until October 1938, when he signed for Exeter City.
