= Listed buildings in Croxden =

Croxden is a civil parish in the district of East Staffordshire, Staffordshire, England. It contains 21 listed buildings that are recorded in the National Heritage List for England. Of these, one is listed at Grade I, the highest of the three grades, and the others are at Grade II, the lowest grade. The parish includes villages including Croxden, Combridge, and Hollington, and is otherwise rural. The most important building in the parish is Croxden Abbey, which is listed at Grade I and is also a scheduled monument. Most of the other listed buildings are houses and associated structures, cottages, farmhouses and farm buildings. The rest of the listed buildings include a church, memorials in the churchyard, a school, a bridge, and a milepost.

== Key ==
Grade	Criteria
I	Buildings of exceptional interest, sometimes considered to be internationally important
II	Buildings of national importance and special interest

== Buildings ==
Name and location	Photograph	Date	Notes	Grade
Croxden Abbey; 52.95497°N 1.90418°W		Late 12th century	The remains of the abbey are in sandstone, and consist of parts of the church and the monastic buildings. The major remains are those of the south wall of the south transept of the church, and the west wall of the nave, both with lancet windows. The abbey is also a scheduled monument.	I
Former barn east of Croxden Abbey; 52.95425°N 1.90102°W	—	Early 16th century (possible)	The barn, which was largely rebuilt in the 19th century, is in stone with a tile roof. There are two storeys and nine bays. In the ground floor are opening windows, the upper floor contains loft openings, and on the roof are two ridge louvres. The west gable end has a sliding door and a loft opening above.	II
Hollywood Farmhouse; 52.93747°N 1.90231°W	—	17th century	The farmhouse is in stone with a timber framed core, bands, and a tile roof. There are two storeys and an L-shaped plan, with a front range of two bays and later extensions to the rear. On the front is a concrete porch and a doorway with a hood mould. To the right of the doorway is a mounting block incorporating a dog kennel, and the windows are modern casements. Inside the farmhouse is a timber framed partition wall.	II
Pointhorne Farmhouse; 52.95147°N 1.88954°W	—	17th century	The farmhouse was altered and extended in the 19th century to form an L-shaped plan. The original part is in stone with two storeys and an attic, the later parts are in red brick with two storeys, and the roof is partly tiled and partly slated. The southeast front contains the earlier material, and has two bays and chamfered mullioned windows. The southwest front has a plinth, a dentilled eaves course, four bays, and casement windows.	II
Cowhouses, granary and stable, Fieldhead Farm; 52.94151°N 1.87207°W	—	c. 1700	The farm buildings form ranges round three sides of a courtyard. They are in red brick and have tile roofs with coped verges. The north range is the oldest, it has five bays, and consists of a cowhouse and a granary. The west range is a three-bay cowhouse dating from the early 19th century, and the east range, dating from the mid to late 19th century, consists of a stable with three bays.	II
Abbey Farmhouse; 52.95467°N 1.90434°W	—	18th century	The farmhouse, which was later extended, is in red brick on a moulded sandstone plinth, with a band and a tile roof with coped verges. There are two storeys and an attic, two parallel ranges with a front of five bays, a 19th-century extension at the rear, and a 20th-century single-storey extension on the left. The central doorway is approached by steps and has a moulded surround, an oblong fanlight, and a cornice hood. The windows are casements with segmental heads.	II
Group of five memorials 52.95604°N 1.90477°W	—	18th century	The memorials are in the churchyard of St Giles' Church, and are in stone. They were formerly wall memorials, most are rectangular, and two have pedimented aedicules.	II
Abbey Lodge; 52.95546°N 1.90495°W		Late 18th century	A stone house that has a tile roof with coped verges on kneelers. There are two storeys and an attic, a front of three bays, and a lower two-storey extension to the right. In the centre is a porch, above which is a round-headed window with a keystone and flanked by pilasters. The other windows are casements with keystones.	II
Granary and linking service wing, Abbey Farmhouse; 52.95472°N 1.90409°W	—	Early 19th century	The service wing and granary are in stone with tile roofs. the granary forming a cross-wing to the east. The service wing has two storeys and four bays, and contains mullioned windows, a door and a garage door. The granary has external steps to the north and contains an entry, a window and vents.	II
Beamhurst Hall; 52.92496°N 1.91472°W	—	Early 19th century	The house is rendered on a stone plinth, with overhanging eaves and a hipped slate roof. There are two storeys and an entrance front of five bays, the central bay projecting. To the right is a doorway with fluted Tuscan columns and a fanlight above the door. The garden front has four bays, and contains two canted bay windows. In the garden front is a casement window with a segmental head, and the other windows are sashes with moulded surrounds.	II
Coach house and stable, Beamhurst Hall; 52.92469°N 1.91457°W	—	Early 19th century	The coach house and stable are in red brick with a hipped slate roof. There are two storeys and five bays. The middle bay contains a segmental-headed coachway, over which is a lunette and a pediment containing an oculus. The outer bays contain stable doors, pitching holes, and fixed windows.	II
Pavilion and shelters, Beamhurst Hall; 52.92505°N 1.91516°W	—	Early 19th century	The pavilions and shelters in the garden of the hall are in red brick with stone dressings and slate roofs. The pavilion is in Greek Revival style, and has one storey and five bays. The bays are divided by pilasters that carry a moulded eaves cornice with decorative cast iron cresting and carved stonework. The pavilion contains sash windows and a doorway with a rectangular fanlight. The shelters have open fronts, four bays divided by brick piers with ball finials, and a central turret.	II
Former cart shed, Beamhurst Hall; 52.92406°N 1.91418°W	—	Early to mid 19th century	The building is in stone with some red brick, and has a tile roof. There is one storey and six bays, it contains doorways and casement windows, and in the right gable end is a pitching hole.	II
Cowhouse, Madeley Park Farm; 52.94187°N 1.90581°W	—	Early to mid 19th century	The cowhouse is in stone with a tile roof, and consists of two ranges at right angles, forming an L-shaped plan. The building contains doorways, windows, loft openings, and stable doors. Between the ranges is a concrete lean-to with a corrugated iron roof.	II
Madeley Park Farmhouse and outhouse 52.94192°N 1.90633°W	—	c. 1840	The farmhouse and attached cottage to the right are in stone with a tile roof, and are in Tudor style. There are two storeys, the farmhouse has three bays, the cottage has one bay, and to the right is an extension linked to an outhouse. There are two doorways, and the windows are chamfered and mullioned, they contain casements, and have hood moulds.	II
Beamhurst Bridge; 52.92073°N 1.90804°W	—	Mid 19th century	The bridge carries the A522 road over the River Tean. It is in stone, and consists of a single segmental arch. The bridge has a moulded band, a coped parapet, and abutments that have end piers with pyramidal caps.	II
Carrington family memorial 52.95588°N 1.90467°W	—	Mid 19th century	The memorial is in the churchyard of St Giles' Church, and is to the memory of members of the Carrington family. It is a chest tomb in stone with an oblong plan. The tomb has two panels on each side and one on each end, all with quadrant corners, and corner pilasters with moulded capping.	II
School, house and pump 52.95814°N 1.91905°W	—	1853	The school and house are in stone with tile roofs, and are in Tudor style. The house to the right has two storeys, two bays, a central doorway, and chamfered mullioned windows. The school has one storey, five bays, and a projecting wing on the left. To the right is a gabled porch with a Tudor arched doorway, and the windows are chamfered, mullioned and transomed. In the garden is a cast iron pump with panelled sides, a concave sided cap, and a finial.	II
Stables and cartshed, Fieldhead Farm; 52.94128°N 1.87249°W	—	Mid to late 19th century	The farm buildings are in red brick with a tile roof, and form a U-shaped plan, with ranges on the north, south and west sides of a small courtyard. They have one storey, and the openings have segmental heads.	II
Milepost at NGR SK 07773885; 52.94686°N 1.88585°W		Mid to late 19th century	The milepost is in cast iron, and has a triangular section and a chamfered top. On the top is the name of the parish, and on the faces are inscribed the distances in miles to Rocester and Ashbourne on the left, and to Hollington, Checkley, and Upper Tean, and the name of the manufacturer.	II
St Giles' Church; 52.95622°N 1.90479°W		1884–85	The church is in stone with a tile roof. It consists of a nave, a south porch, a chancel, and a south chapel. At the west end are buttresses, two lancet windows and a bellcote, and the east window has three lights.	II
