= Simon Degge =

Historical British sheriff and author

Sir Simon Degge
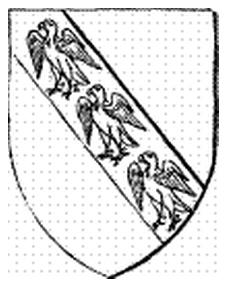
- The Degge Arms
- Born: 1612; Uttoxeter, Staffordshire
- Died: 1703 (aged 90–91)
- Resting place: Kingstone, Staffordshire, England, UK
- Occupations: Barrister, sheriff
- Known for: High Sheriff of Derbyshire, Book on Canon Law, Justice of North Wales

Sir Simon Degge (1612–1703) was High Sheriff of Derbyshire and served North Wales as a Justice. It was said that he served his year as sheriff in "barrister robes and with a sword by his side". Degge was a Royalist and wrote a reference book on the law and rights of a parson called the Parson's Counsellor.... The book includes advice on the income from a glebe, Jus patronatus and the crime of Simony.

== Life ==
Simon Degge was born on 5 January 1612, probably in or near Uttoxeter, Staffordshire. He was the first son of Thomas Degge.

He was arrested as a Royalist during the Long Parliament and released in 1643–44 on condition that he remained at Stafford. Degge married Jane Orrell in 1652. He was called to the bar in 1653 and rose in seven years to be a judge in west Wales. He was a recorder at the court in Derby in 1661 and the following year he became a steward of the manor court of Peverel and a justice of the Welsh marshes.

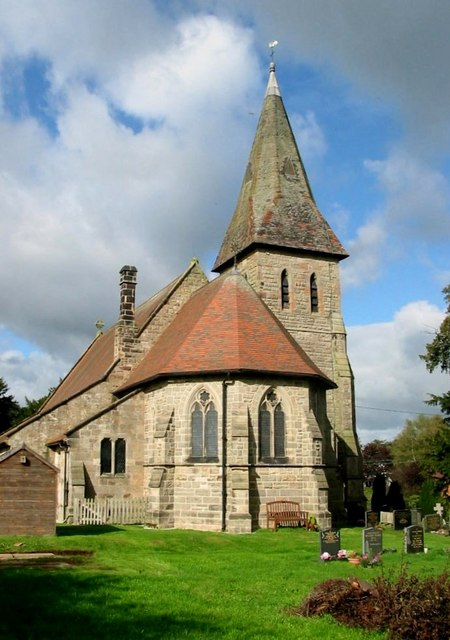
The Church at Kingstone today

After he was knighted he was fined twice by the courts for failing to do his duties. He was fined 100 marks for failing to "come to the bench" but he was still a bencher and by 1675 he was appointed by the King as High Sheriff of Derbyshire after settling in Derby. His home was Babington Hall which had been the "most eminent in Derby". Degge served as Sheriff while being a successful barrister. It was said that he served his year as Sheriff in "barrister robes and with a sword by his side".

In 1674, he failed again in his duties but was able to avoid punishment as he has a letter from the King excusing him. That same year, he was fined two hundred pounds after he failed to serve after being elected as Lent Reader. He was also removed from the list of judges.

It is reported that Degge was involved with a case involving Noah Bullock of Derby. This man was reported to have given his sons the names of Shem, Ham, and Japhet, and to have built an ark which he kept on the River Derwent. Bullock was said to have been reported to Degge as an alleged forger. Degge was a friend of Bullock and he warned him that it was known that he was forging coins and the consequences of his crime. Bullock is said to have sunk the ark and escaped justice. A pub of that name still exists in Derby. However, Degge had already ceased to be a judge in 1676.

In 1676, the Parson's Counsellor and law of Tithes was published and that was well regarded as a text book going through seven editions before 1720. The book dealt with ecclesiastical law and custom concerning the parish, its vicar, his bishop and the causes and remedies for dispute. There were many chapters of the details of tithing as well as now obscure problems such as, the income from a glebe, Jus patronatus and Simony.

Degge purchased the "ancient mansion" of Bowden Hall near Chapel-en-le-Frith in 1680. Degge's second wife died in 1696 and he died in 1703, leaving sons and a daughter. He was buried in a chapel he had had built at Kingstone.

== Works ==
- Parson's Counsellor and Law of Tithes and Tithing, (1676)
- Observations upon the Possessors of Monastery Lands in Staffordshire, in Sampson Erdeswicke's Staffordshire.
