= Uttoxeter Town Hall =

Municipal building in Uttoxeter, Staffordshire, England

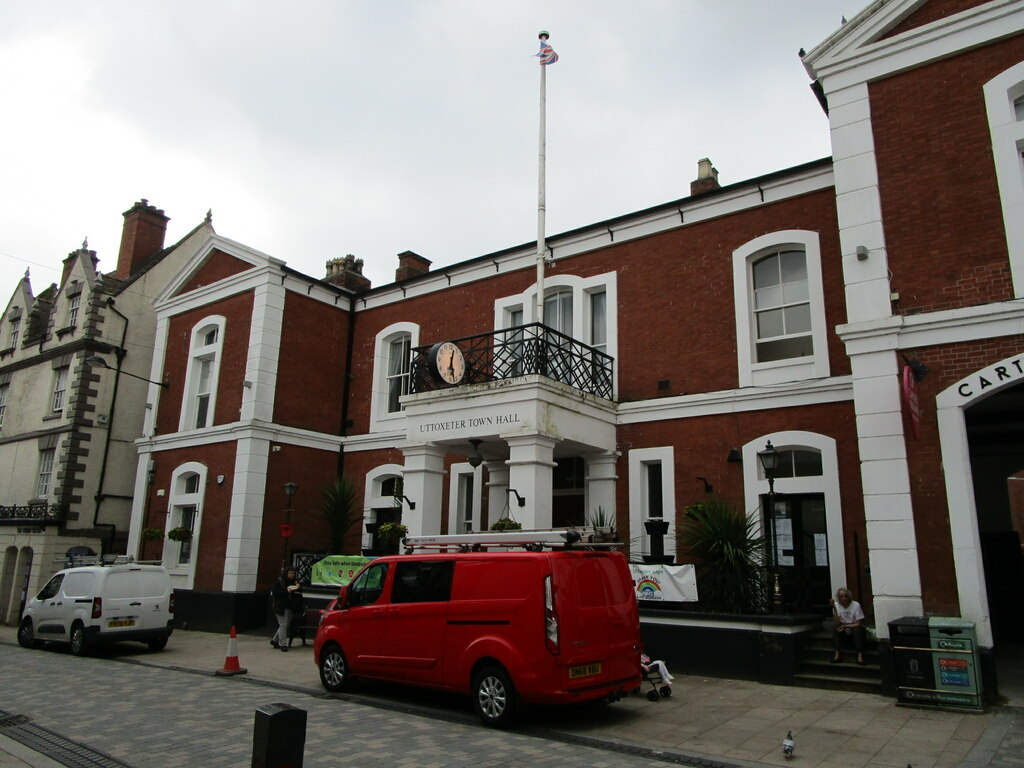
- Uttoxeter Town Hall

- Shown in Staffordshire
- 52.8992°N 1.8657°W
- Location: High Street, Uttoxeter

History
- Built: 1854

Site notes
- Architect: Thomas Fradgley
- Architectural style: Neoclassical style

Listed Building – Grade II
- Official name: Town Hall
- Designated: 8 January 1993
- Reference no.: 1253438

Uttoxeter Town Hall is a municipal building in the High Street, Uttoxeter, Staffordshire, England. The structure, which serves as the meeting place of Uttoxeter Town Council, is a Grade II listed building.

== History ==
The foundation stone for the building was laid by Lord Waterpark of Doveridge Hall on 25 August 1853. It was designed by the local architect, Thomas Fradgley, in the neoclassical style, built in red brick with painted ashlar stone dressings at a cost of £4,000 and was officially opened on 29 November 1854. The opening ceremony was used as an opportunity to raise funds for the Patriotic Fund which supported widows and orphans created by the Crimean War which was ongoing at the time.

The design involved a symmetrical main frontage with five bays facing onto the High Street with the end bays projected forward as pavilions; the central section of three bays featured a porch with square Doric order columns supporting an entablature and a wrought iron balcony; the porch was flanked by lancet windows and, beyond that, doorways. There was a central Venetian window on the first floor, while the other bays were fenestrated by round headed sash windows. The right hand end bay incorporated a segmental archway with a keystone. Internally, the principal rooms were the main assembly hall, the council chamber, a room for the literary institute and a police station with police cells.

The town hall was used for county court hearings as well as magistrates' court hearings and a cattle market was established behind the building. Following significant population growth, largely associated with the status of Uttoxeter as a market town, the area became an urban district with the town hall as its headquarters in 1896. In summer 1940, a ball was held in the town hall to raise money for the British War Comforts Fund which supported service personnel serving overseas during the Second World War. The town hall was extended to the rear in the 1960s.

The building continued to serve as the headquarters of the urban district council for much of the 20th century but ceased to be the local seat of government after the enlarged East Staffordshire District Council which was formed in 1974. However, following the formation of Uttoxeter Town Council at that time, the town hall became the offices and meeting place of the new town council. In 2000, a projecting clock, which had been donated by the Uttoxeter Lions Club, was attached to the town hall balcony, and, in 2008, the town council sold the land behind the town hall, as well as the room over the archway, to Taylor Wimpey for residential and retail development.

A turret clock, which had been recovered from Bunting's Brewery when it was demolished in the 1960s, and which had been subsequently been languishing in the basement of the town hall, was refurbished and placed on display in the town hall in 2005; it was moved and installed above the entrance to the Costa Coffee shop in the Carters Square Shopping Centre shortly before the centre opened in 2014.

In June 2017, the town council bought back part of the area it had sold in order to establish a bar area to support its activities as an approved venue for marriages and civil partnership ceremonies. The new facilities were named the Adam Peaty Suite to recognise the achievements of the locally-born swimmer, Adam Peaty.

== See also ==
- Listed buildings in Uttoxeter
