= Uttoxeter Casket =

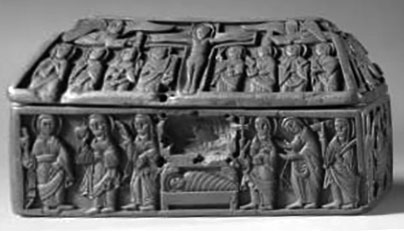
Front view of the Uttoxeter casket

The Uttoxeter Casket, also known as Philip Nelson's casket, is an Anglo Saxon reliquary from Uttoxeter, Staffordshire in England. As of 2017, it is held at the Cleveland Museum of Art in Ohio, United States. House-shaped and carved from a single piece of boxwood, it remains the only known surviving wood carving with such an elaborate iconographic programme from this period of British history.

== History ==
The lid of the box was found at a cottage near Uttoxeter, Staffordshire in the mid-19th century. The Uttoxeter historian Francis Redfern in his History of the Town of Uttoxeter, writing in the 1850s mentions that at Croxden “A curious carved oak panel of Jesus and the Twelve Apostles has lately come to light, and been a subject of discussion at a meeting of a brotherhood of antiquaries at Manchester.”

The ruined Cistercian Croxden Abbey as the largest religious building in the locality, would be the most logical source of such an object. The box might have been pillaged or hidden at the time of the dissolution of the monasteries when Croxden Abbey surrendered to the Crown in 1538.

In 1936, the lid, which had first been re-discovered in Uttoxeter eight decades earlier, entered the Victoria & Albert Museum (V&A) for an opinion. It was by this time owned by the Convent of the Sacred Heart in Hammersmith (London). A Liverpool collector and specialist, Philip Nelson (1872–1953), had purchased the bottom piece in 1921 from a private owner in Warrington, Cheshire, for the sum of £175. Nelson was a man of independent means who devoted much of his energy and resources to antiquarian pursuits. He was well known in numismatic circles for a number of publications. The lid came to Nelson's attention and it was realised that the two wooden items belonged together. Nelson convinced the convent to sell the lid to him for £120. The box and its lid were reunited for the first time in at least a century and possibly much longer.

Nelson lent the box to the V&A where it remained on exhibit from 1937 until his death in 1953. He published an article on it in the academic publication Archaeologia in 1937. After Nelson's death the reliquary was sold to an American dealer, and subsequently to The Cleveland Museum of Art.

== Description ==
The casket is a rare, possibly unique, example of high-quality Anglo Saxon wood carving, dating from c. 1050. It is decorated with scenes from Christ's life. On one long side, the Christ child rests in the manger. Above, the Crucifixion is shown with mourners gathered below the cross and two angels flanking it on either side. On the other long side is the Ascension, God's hand pulling Christ heavenward. Christ in Majesty appears above. The short sides show Christ’s entry into Jerusalem and the other his baptism though it is possibly first bath at the hands of the Emea (midwife) and Salome. It has a similar design influence to the Hereford Gospels in Hereford Cathedral Library and the Hereford Troper in the British Library, where the figures are said to resemble one another stylistically.

The box measures 15 cm (6 in) in length, 5.5 cm (2¾ in) in width, and has a total height of 8.5 cm (3½ in). It is missing its lock and one hinge. The remaining hinge is made from a copper alloy. This type of portable house-shrine was based on the earliest classical form of full-sized feretory or sarcophagus, aptly denominated by early medieval witnesses as a domunculus – or domuncula as in Bede – i.e. ‘little house’ – or even tugurium ‘hut’, which in the case of St Chad’s shrine alluded to by Bede was made of wood rather than stone. The portable form, suitable for displaying on an altar, is well represented in Anglo-Saxon art by the hip-roofed Uttoxeter casket.

Catherine Karkov, in her book The Art of Anglo Saxon England, suggests that if the box is a reliquary, the way in which the figure of Christ appears centrally suggests it may have held a relic from one of the events of Christ’s life. As the box is made of wood, a piece of the True Cross would have been especially appropriate.

== See also ==
- Franks Casket, an earlier Anglo-Saxon casket in bone
- Brescia Casket, earlier Italian ivory casket
