= Lewis Hall (politician) =

English-born dental surgeon and politician (1860–1933)

- Born: 1860; Uttoxeter, Staffordshire, England
- Died: 11 August 1933 (aged 73); Victoria, British Columbia, Canada
- Education: Philadelphia College of Dental Surgery
- Occupations: Dentist, politician

Lewis Hall (1860 – 11 August 1933) was an English-born dental surgeon and politician in British Columbia, Canada. He served as mayor of Victoria from 1908 to 1909.

Hall was born in 1860 in Uttoxeter, Staffordshire and came to the Ottawa area with his family at the age of two. The family moved to Chemainus in 1876. He studied at the Philadelphia College of Dental Surgery and entered practice in Oakville, Ontario, soon afterwards moving to Victoria. In 1889, Hall married Sophia M. Cummings. He opened the Central Drug Store in 1892. Hall served on the local school board from 1896 to 1904 and was a member of Victoria city council from 1906 to 1907.

He died on 11 August 1933 in Victoria at the age of 73 after an extended illness.
