= Gratwich =

Village in Staffordshire, England

Coordinates: 52.882°N 1.959°W

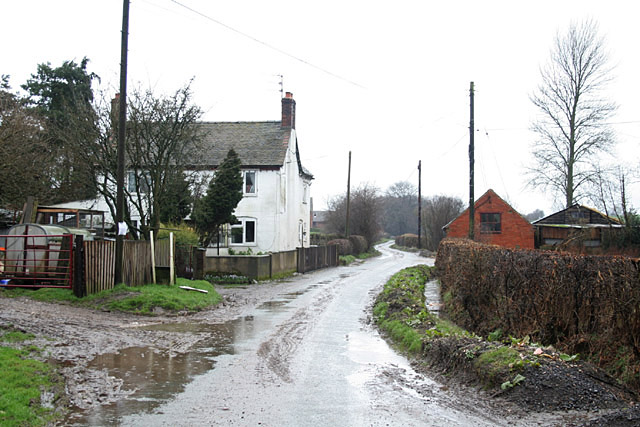

- Location within Staffordshire
- Civil parish: Kingstone
- District: East Staffordshire
- Shire county: Staffordshire
- Region: West Midlands
- Country: England
- Sovereign state: United Kingdom

Gratwich is a village and former civil parish, now in the parish of Kingstone, in the East Staffordshire district, in the county of Staffordshire, England. It is miles southwest of Uttoxeter in the valley of the River Blythe. In 1931 the parish had a population of 58.

It is believed that the name Gratwich comes from the Old English ‘greot’, meaning gravel and ‘wic’ meaning “lying on”, so Gratwich means 'lying on gravel'. An alternative possibility may be “a dairy farm by the gravelly stream”. In the Domesday Book of 1086 Gratwich is recorded as Crotewiche. At that time the manor was part of the lands of Robert de Stafford. There was sufficient arable land for three ploughs. The recorded population was four villeins, five bordars and one serf. There was a grist mill which brought in four shillings per year, and the manor was recorded as being worth 24 shillings per year. There was one acre of meadow and a wood half a league in length and breadth.

The village church is St. Mary the Virgin's.

On 1 April 1934 the parish was abolished and merged with Kingstone.

== Notable people ==
- Notable local people include native Ruth Gledhill (born 1959), journalist for The Times, daughter of the vicar of the time.
- Alfred Ronalds researched his renowned book The Fly-fisher's Entomology (1836) while living nearby at Lea Fields.

== See also ==
- Listed buildings in Kingstone, Staffordshire
