= St Mary's Catholic Church, Uttoxeter =

St. Mary's Catholic Church
- St. Mary's Catholic Church
- 52.896°N 1.866°W
- Location: Uttoxeter, Staffordshire
- Country: England
- Denomination: Roman Catholic
- Website: official website

History
- Dedicated: 22 August 1839

Architecture
- Architect: A. W. N. Pugin
- Years built: 4 October 1838

Administration
- Diocese: Birmingham
- Parish: St Mary, Uttoxeter

Clergy
- Priest(s): Father Michael Bonaccorsi and Father Christopher Cann

St Mary's Catholic Church is a Roman Catholic church in Uttoxeter, Staffordshire, United Kingdom. It opened in 1839; to avoid confusion with the other St Mary's church in the town it is referred to as The Catholic Church by locals. It is part of the parish of St. Mary along with Sacred Heart Church, Abbots Bromley.

== History ==
The church was designed by Augustus Pugin and was his first church design. Construction started on 4 October 1838 and the building was opened on 22 August 1839. The church was the work of Father Morgan of the Cresswell mission. The church was expanded with the addition of a chancel which was completed in 1879. It was again expanded in 1913. It also has a Presbytery designed by Pugin which later on was extended that is connected to the side of the church.
