= Croxden Abbey =

Cistercian abbey in Croxden, Staffordshire, England

Coordinates: 52°57′16″N 1°54′13″W

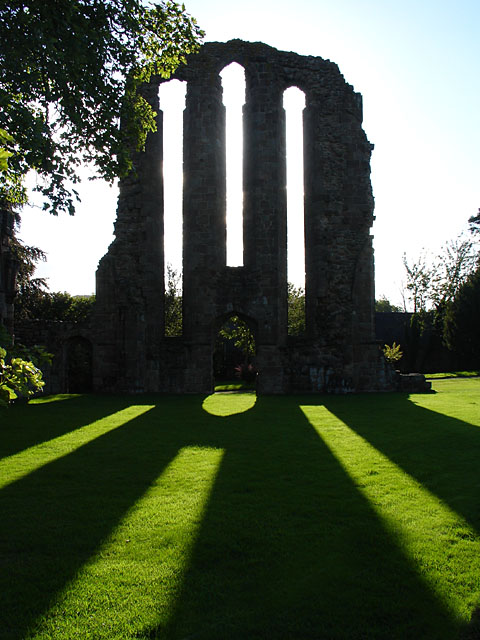
- Interactive map of Croxden Abbey

Monastery information
- Other name: The abbey of the Vale of St. Mary of Croxden
- Order: Cistercian
- Established: 1179
- Disestablished: 1538
- Dedication: Virgin Mary

People
- Founder: Bertram III de Verdun

Site
- Location: Croxden, Staffordshire, United Kingdom
- Public access: Yes

Croxden Abbey, also known as "Abbey of the Vale of St. Mary at Croxden", was a Cistercian abbey at Croxden, Staffordshire, United Kingdom. A daughter house of the abbey in Aunay-sur-Odon, Normandy, the abbey was founded by Bertram III de Verdun of Alton Castle, Staffordshire, in the 12th century. The abbey was dissolved in 1538.

== History ==
=== Foundation and early history ===
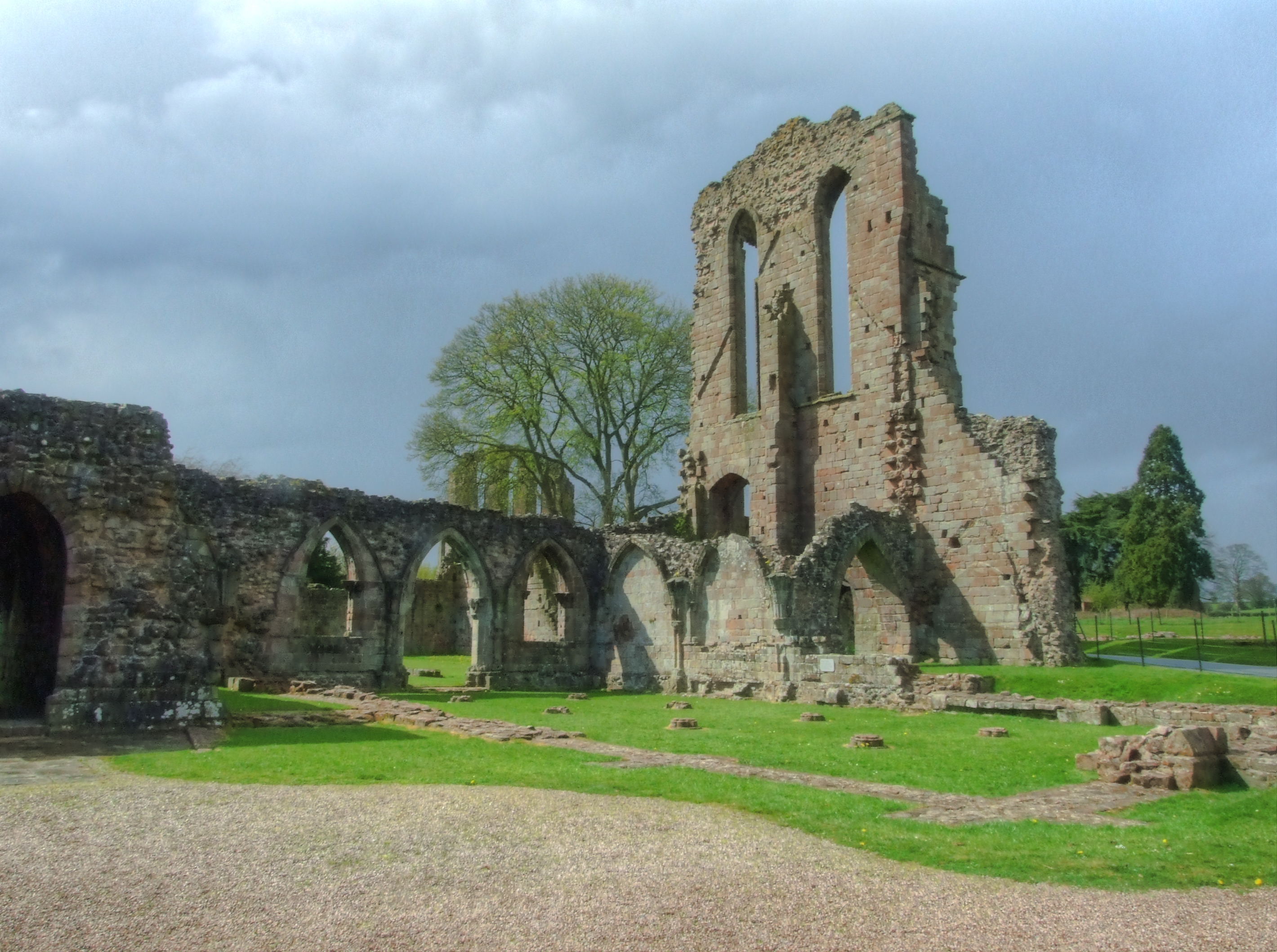
The ruins of the abbey chapterhouse

In 1176, Bertram III de Verdun, the lord of the manor of Croxden, endowed a site for a new abbey near Alton, Staffordshire, to a group of 12 Cistercian monks from Aunay-sur-Odon, Normandy. Bertram founded the abbey, like many noblemen of his time, for the souls of his family and on the condition that the monks would celebrate mass for the souls of Norman de Verdun, my father, and of Lescelina, my mother, and of Richard de Humez, who brought me up, and of my predecessors; and for the well-being of myself and Rohais my wife, and my successors;

The monks remained at the Alton site until 1179, before moving to land near Croxden, a few miles south. Grants of land were made by Bertram de Verdun to the abbey across Staffordshire, Cheshire, Derbyshire and Leicestershire, along with the churches of Alton and Tugby, and two chapels at Keythorpe and East Norton.

The abbey continued to expand into the 13th century, with King John awarding the monks an annuity of £5 from the Exchequer of Ireland in 1200, before exchanging it for land in Adeney, Shropshire, in 1206. Croxden was relatively prosperous at this time, drawing the majority of its wealth from sheep farming. By 1315, the monks were supplying more wool to the continent than any other religious house in the county, with transactions being recorded with Florentine merchants well into the 1420s. The abbey's wealth is reflected in the purchase of a house in London by abbot William of Over for £20.

=== Decline and dissolution ===
By the 14th century, Croxden's financial situation had worsened. The strains of royal taxation, the repayment of loans and the imposition of a corrodian combined with bad harvests and plague were a drain on the abbey's resources.

With the death of Theobald II de Verdun, the last of the senior direct male line of the family in 1316, leaving four daughters as his heirs, the patronage of the abbey became the inheritance of the eldest heiress Joan de Verdun, who married secondly Thomas de Furnivall, 2nd Baron Furnivall of Hallamshire, into whose family Alton and Croxden passed. There was a number of serious disputes between the monks and de Furnivall concerning his use of abbey lands and property, culminating in the monks barricading themselves within the abbey for 16 weeks in 1319. It wasn't until July 1319, with the help of other local landowners, that the monks received an assize of novel disseisin and their property usage was returned to them.

With an income of less than £200 per year the abbey should have been suppressed under the Suppression of Religious Houses Act 1535, which dictated all religious houses with a low annual income should be dissolved. The monks paid a fine of £100 for a royal licence to continue, until 1537 when the abbey was surrendered and the land and property sold off. The king granted the monks pensions, with the last abbot receiving an annual sum of £26 13s. 4d.

Two 16th-century deeds relating to the abbey's property, just prior to its dissolution, are held at the Cadbury Research Library, University of Birmingham.

=== After dissolution ===
The mid-13th-century chapel survived as the church for the parish of Croxden until 1886, when it was replaced by newer building to the north. In 1936 the site passed into the care of the Ministry of Public Building and Works, and is today managed by English Heritage. The substantial ruins of a number of the buildings are still standing and, thanks to excavations in 1968, the foundations of some demolished buildings are also traceable.

== Layout and architecture ==
The design of the church was based on the abbey's mother church in Aunay-sur-Odon and is considered more elaborate than most Cistercian architecture. The west wall, including two doorways and lancet windows above them, is still almost complete.

The conventual and service buildings were situated to the south of the church, and include a sacristy, chapterhouse, kitchen and dormitory. The upper floors which included the dormitory and a treasury are no longer extant.

== The Uttoxeter Casket ==
The Uttoxeter Casket or Dr Nelson's Casket is a wooden Anglo-Saxon reliquary which probably came from Croxden Abbey. It is likely that it held a religious relic and was displayed on an altar. The casket currently resides in the Cleveland Museum of Art in Ohio.

== Burials ==
- Bertram III de Verdun, founder of the Abbey.
- Rohese de Verdun (also recorded as 'Rohais'), wife of Bertram III de Verdun.
- Theobald de Verdun, 2nd Baron Verdun, who married 1st Matilda Mortimer and 2nd (as her 2nd husband) Elizabeth de Clare, youngest daughter of Gilbert de Clare, 6th Earl of Hertford and Joan of Acre and widow of John de Burgh, heir apparent to the Earldom of Ulster.
- Matilda Mortimer (otherwise 'Maud'), daughter of Edmund Mortimer, 2nd Baron Mortimer and 1st wife of Theobald de Verdun, 2nd Baron Verdun.

Elizabeth de Segrave de Mowbray d 25 May 1358

== See also ==
- Grade I listed buildings in Staffordshire
- Listed buildings in Croxden
- William de Shepesheved
