= Uttoxeter =

Market town in Staffordshire, England

Coordinates: 52.898°N 1.860°W

- Town
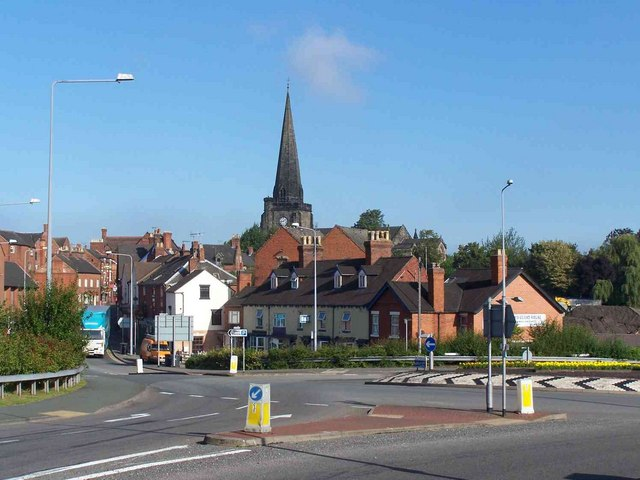
- St Mary's Church

- Location within Staffordshire
- Population: 14,014 (2021)
- OS grid reference: SK0933
- Civil parish: Uttoxeter
- District: East Staffordshire
- Shire county: Staffordshire
- Region: West Midlands
- Country: England
- Sovereign state: United Kingdom
- Post town: UTTOXETER
- Postcode district: ST14
- Dialling code: 01889
- Police: Staffordshire
- Fire: Staffordshire
- Ambulance: West Midlands
- UK Parliament: Burton and Uttoxeter

Uttoxeter (/juːˈtɒksɪtər/ yoo-TOK-sit-ər, locally also /ˈʊtʃɪtər/ UUTCH-it-ər) is a market town and civil parish in the East Staffordshire borough of Staffordshire, England. It is near to the Derbyshire county border.

The town is 14 miles (23 km) from Burton upon Trent via the A50 and the A38, 14 miles (23 km) from Stafford via the A518, 18 miles (29 km) from Stoke-on-Trent via the A50, and 19 miles (31 km) from Derby via the A50 and the A38, and 11 miles (18 km) northeast of Rugeley via the A518 and the B5013.

The population was 14,014 at the 2021 Census.

The town's literary connections include Samuel Johnson and Mary Howitt.

== History ==
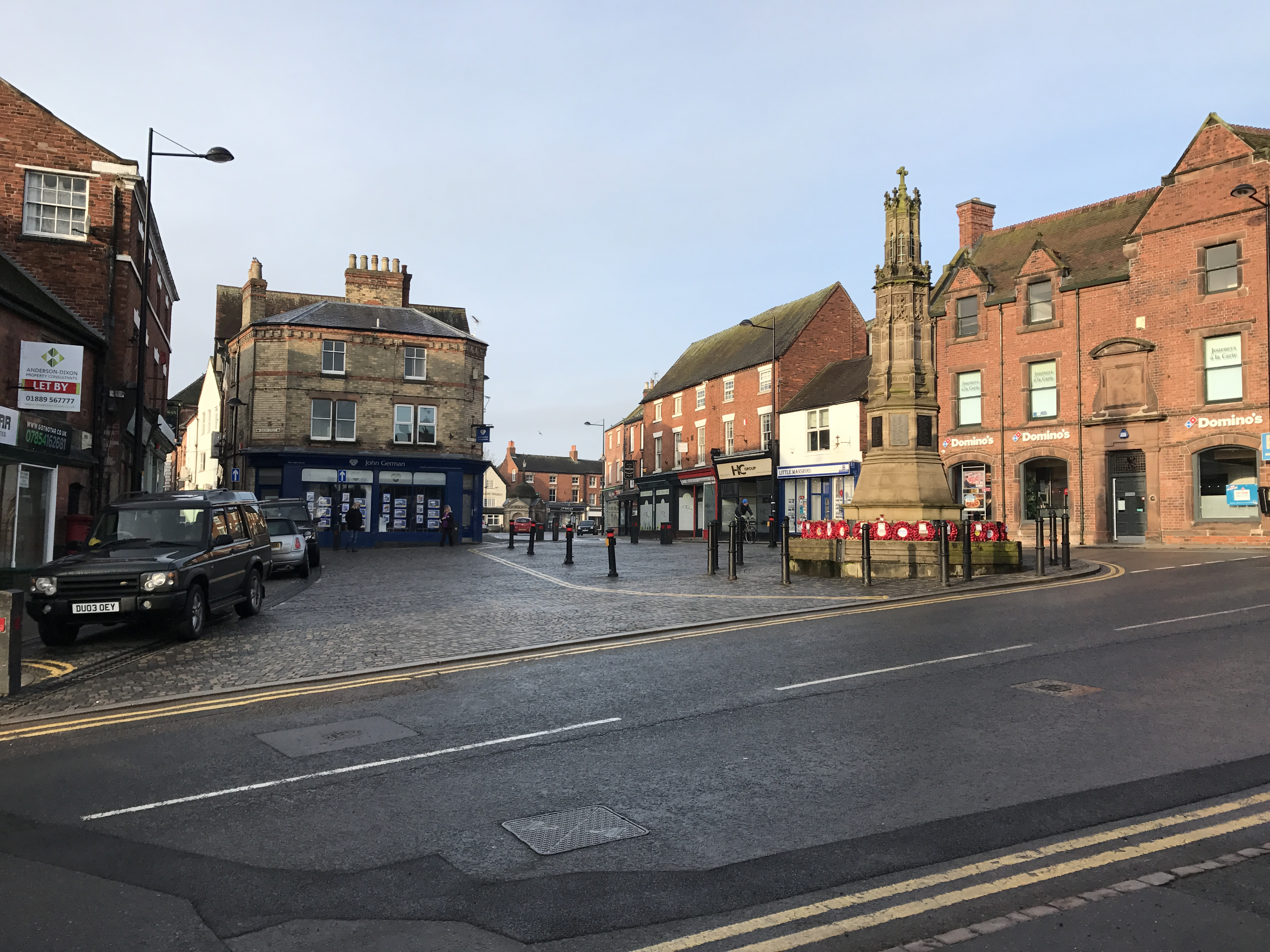
Town Centre, Uttoxeter

Uttoxeter's name has been spelt at least 79 ways since it appeared in the Domesday Book of 1086 as "Wotocheshede": it probably came from Anglo-Saxon Wuttuceshǣddre, meaning "Wuttuc's homestead on the heath". Some historians have pointed to pre-Roman settlement here; axes from the Bronze Age discovered in the town are now on display in the Potteries Museum in Stoke-on-Trent. It is possible that Uttoxeter was the location of some form of Roman activity, due to its strategic position on the River Dove and its closeness to the large garrison forts at Rocester between 69 and 400 AD, and the recently discovered fort at Stramshall. However, little corroborating archaeological evidence has been found.

Uttoxeter saw the last major royalist surrender of the English Civil War, on 25 August 1648, when James Hamilton, 1st Duke of Hamilton surrendered to Parliamentarian General John Lambert.

Perhaps the most famous historical event to have occurred in Uttoxeter is an act of penance by Samuel Johnson. Johnson's father ran a bookstall on Uttoxeter market, and young Samuel once refused to help out on the stall. When Johnson was older, he stood in the rain without a hat, as penance for his failure to assist his father. The event is commemorated by the Johnson Memorial, which stands in Market Place in the town centre. He is also remembered in the name of Johnson Road.

Mary Howitt, the Quaker writer of the poem "The Spider and the Fly", grew up in Uttoxeter. The town influenced some of her poems and novels and fuelled her love of natural history, which also featured in her books. Howitt Crescent, a residential road in the town, was named after her. The house where she lived, Howitt Place, is still standing in Balance Street.

Thomas Fradgley, Uttoxeter's own architect, designed Uttoxeter Town Hall (1854), the Johnson Memorial (1854), St Michael's Church, Stramshall, St Lawrence Church, Bramshall (1835), St Mary's Church, Uttoxeter, and Marchington Church. He was involved with Pugin and other architects in designs for the 16th Earl of Shrewsbury at Alton Towers including the figures of the Talbot Hounds at the entrance tower (1830), the Angel Corbels in the Lady chapel, 1833, Alton Towers Chapel with Joseph Potter (completed in 1833), Swiss Cottage, and Harper's Cottage, Farley. He was the architect who improved several local schools, including Uttoxeter National School, Hanbury Free School (enlarged in 1848), national schools at Oakamoor, Cauldon, Alton, and Draycott School, Hanbury. He married Clara Warner from Bramshall. Their only child Thomas died aged six. Thomas Fradgley died in 1883 aged 83.

Bunting's brewery had occupied a large area of the centre of the town since the Victorian era. It ceased production in the 1929 after being bought by Parkers Brewery of Burslem, later part of Ind Coope. The remains of the brewery were demolished in the 1960s to make way for the Maltings shopping precinct and car park. The turret clock from the brewery, which had been languishing in the basement of the town hall, was refurbished and installed above the entrance to what was the Costa Coffee shop (now St Giles charity shop) in the Carters Square Shopping Centre shortly before the centre opened in 2014.

In 2008, Uttoxeter marked the 700th anniversary of its market charter of 1308, which underpins the markets held on Saturdays and Wednesdays and on other festival days. The 1308 charter followed a more general Royal Charter granted to the town's burgesses in 1252.

== Governance ==
There are three tiers of local government covering Uttoxeter, at civil parish (town), district and county level: Uttoxeter Town Council, East Staffordshire Borough Council, and Staffordshire County Council. The town council is based at Uttoxeter Town Hall on the High Street.

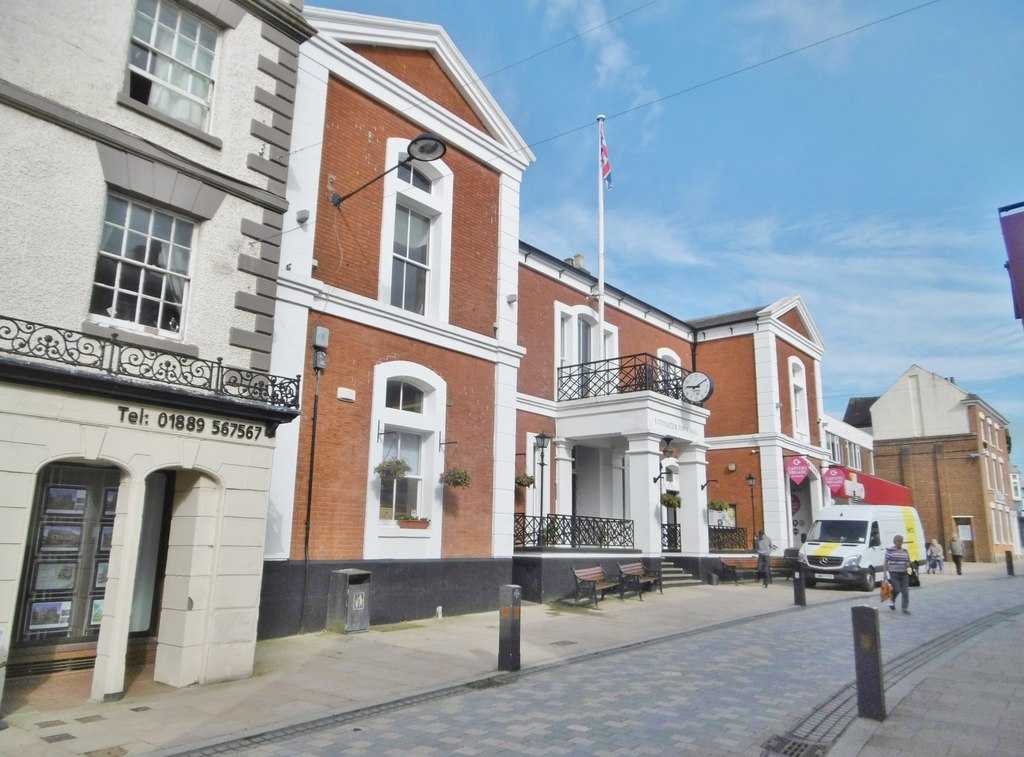
Uttoxeter Town Hall

Uttoxeter was an ancient parish. When elected parish and district councils were created in 1894 it was given a parish council and included in the Uttoxeter Rural District. Shortly afterwards it was decided to create an urban district covering the town, making it independent from the rural district council. It was concluded that the whole parish was not suitable to be an urban district, so the rural parts of the parish were made a separate parish called Uttoxeter Rural which stayed in the rural district, whilst the rest became the Uttoxeter Urban District in 1896. In 1899 the urban district council purchased the Town Hall, which had been built in 1854.

Uttoxeter Urban District was abolished in 1974, becoming part of the new district of East Staffordshire. A successor parish was created covering the former urban district, with its parish council taking the name Uttoxeter Town Council.

== Economy ==
In 1945, Joseph Cyril Bamford founded J C Bamford Excavators Limited in Uttoxeter, now known as JCB. The firm, based in the nearby village of Rocester, is the world's third-largest construction equipment manufacturer. The firm's first vehicle was a tipping trailer made from war-surplus materials, which J. C. Bamford built in a rented lock-up garage in Uttoxeter. The Bamford family had previously started Bamfords, later Bamford International Farm Machinery which was a large employer in the town from the end of the 19th century through to the early 1980s, when it gradually declined before closing in 1989. The land and former building were acquired by JCB for its "Special Products" division. This has now closed and the buildings have been demolished, but the site has yet to be redeveloped. JCB has other factories in Uttoxeter, Cheadle, Foston and Wrexham, and abroad in the United States and India.

Elkes Biscuits, previously Fox's Biscuits, has a factory in Uttoxeter. Elkes was the creator of the malted milk biscuit. Glennans Crisps, specialising in vegetable crisps, is based in the town. It was bought by Tyrrells Crisps in 2012.

Uttoxeter Racecourse, home to the Midlands Grand National, brings visitors to the town centre shops and markets. Proximity to the Alton Towers Resort, St. George's Park National Football Centre and the Peak District National Park means tourism is important to the local economy.

Agriculture remains important, as the town is set in rich dairy farming country. Uttoxeter previously housed a large dairy and was historically a major trader in butter and cheese. The farming cooperative Dairy Farmers of Britain had another large dairy in the nearby village of Fole, but this closed in 2008 and the firm went into administration the next year. A new cattle market was due to be built in the town after the old one was demolished in 2004, having stood dormant since the 2001 foot and mouth outbreak. No progress was made and it is now unlikely that the town will regain one, the land now having been redeveloped into a pedestrianised shopping area, composed of an Asda store, GP surgery and retail outlets.

=== Recent development ===
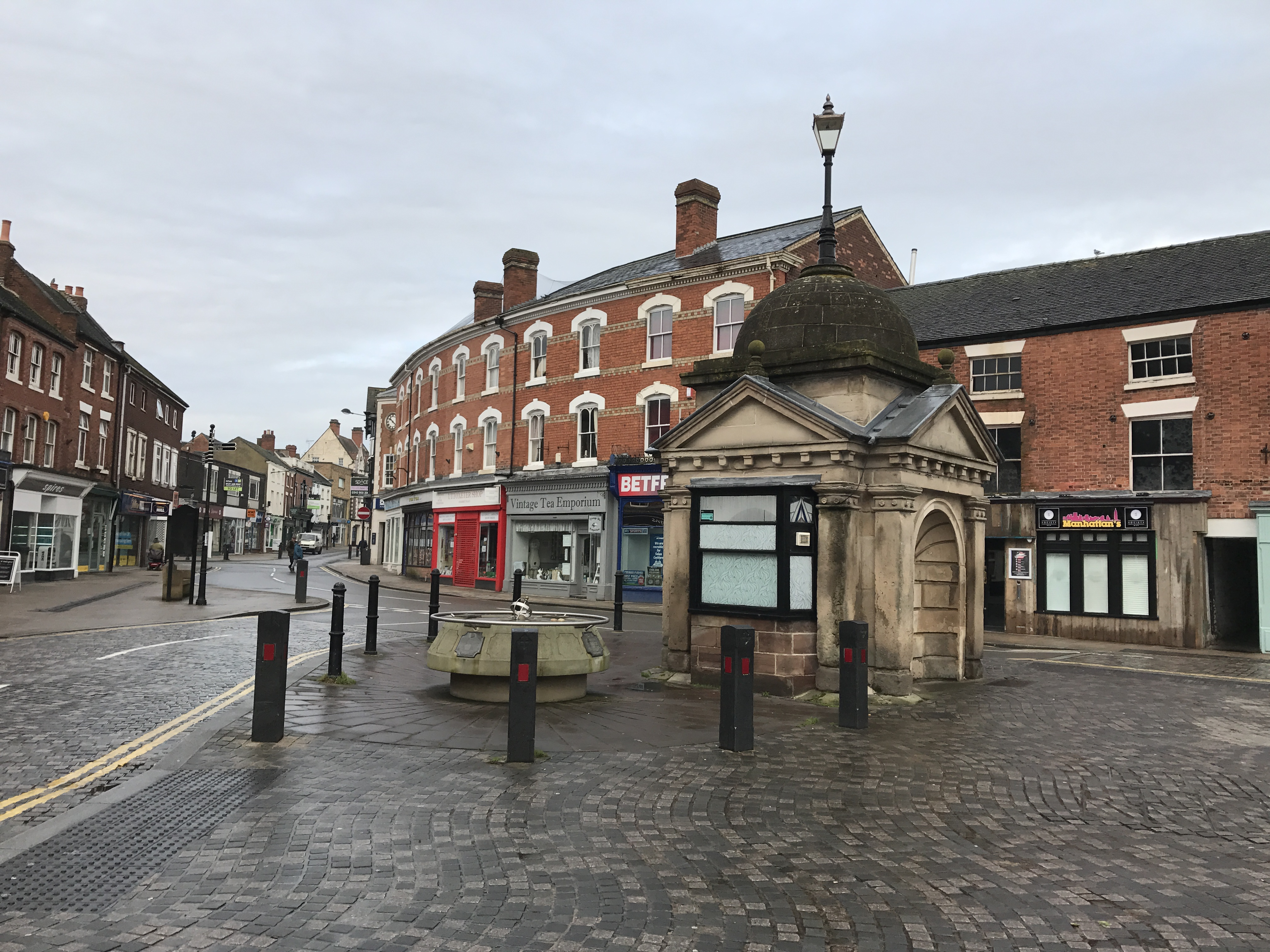
2017 – Uttoxeter Market Square

Uttoxeter town centre underwent a development scheme in 2006–2007, with the Market Place, Market Street, Queens Street, Carter Street, and High Street receiving new stone paving and street furniture.

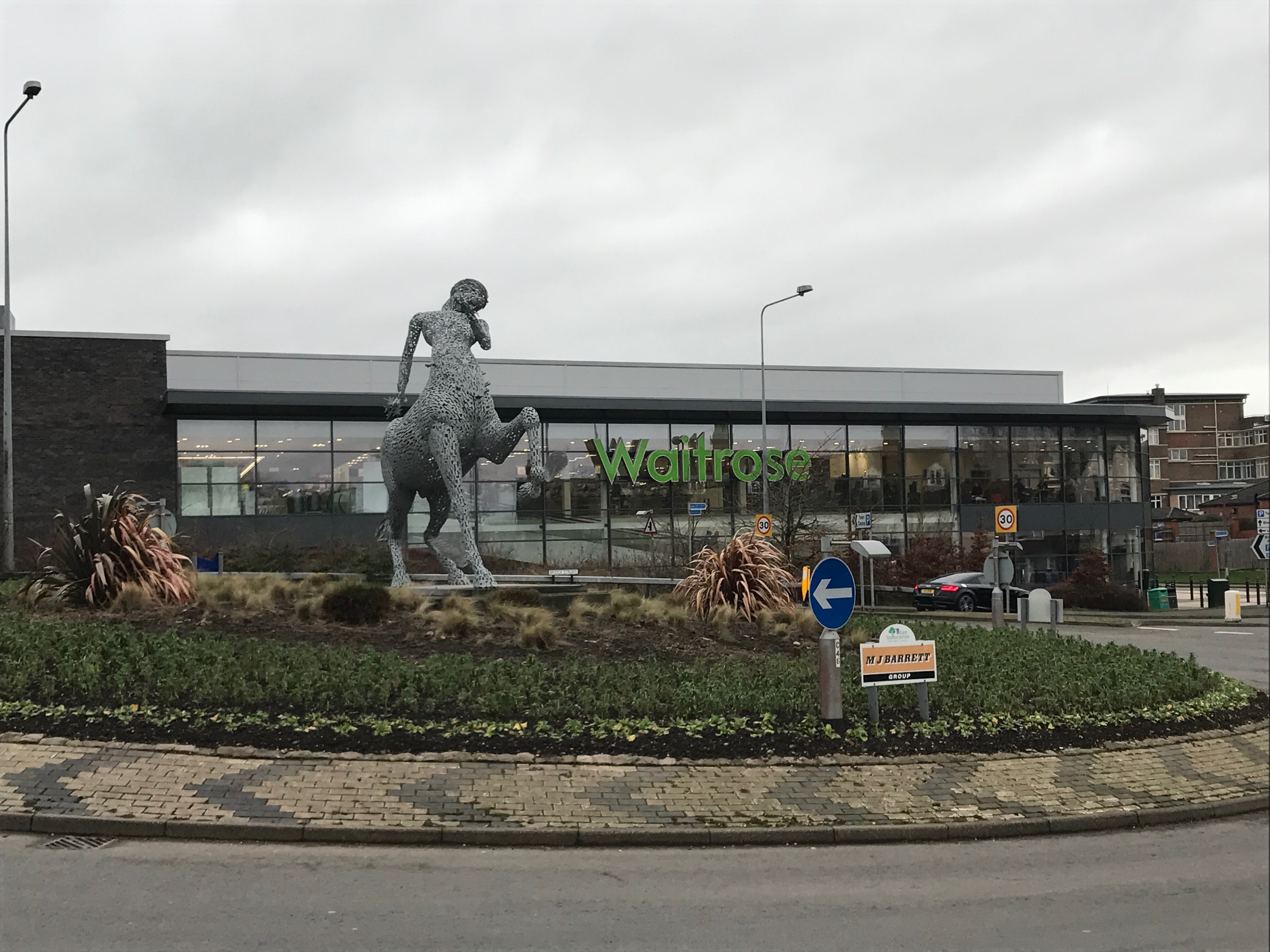
Waitrose, Uttoxeter opened 2016

Phased development of Dovefields Retail Park began in 1998 with a Tesco supermarket on the edge of the town and expansion in 2002 with seven large retail outlets. In 2005 an entertainment development with a bowling alley, an ice rink, a cinema, a children's crèche, a fitness centre and business units was built.

The old Cattle Market closed in November 2005 in favour of a retail and housing development, Carter Square, opening in 2014. This features a supermarket, a range of smaller retail units and a medical surgery.

The replacement cattle market, granted planning permission on the outskirts of the town, failed to appear after several years. A municipal recycling depot has opened on part of the site.

The JCB site in the centre of Uttoxeter was demolished in 2009 after the firm moved to one of its sites on the edge of town. This site is currently undergoing redevelopment: a Waitrose store opened there in 2016 and an Aldi store opened there in 2022. The Lidl store, previously located between Dovefields Retail Park and the town centre relocated several hundred meters along the road to a new unit built on land previously used for light industry. Plans have been approved for hundreds of homes, a park and business units.

In 2019, the Uttoxeter Brewing Company began licensed operations in a purpose built property sharing the car park of the White Hart Hotel in the town centre, the first commercial brewing operations in the town since the closure of Bunting's Brewery in 1929.

== Demography ==
According to the 2021 census the population for Uttoxeter Civil Parish was 14,014. 96% of the population are White British and 95% are UK born. The population is relatively stable with an annual population growth of 0.38% between 2011 and 2021.

== Transport ==
Uttoxeter has a railway station, opened originally by the North Staffordshire Railway on 2 October 1881 to replace earlier stations. It is served by trains on the Crewe-Derby Line, which generally operate hourly each way between Crewe and Newark Castle.

The bus station offers services operated by Diamond (formerly Midland Classic), Chaserider, D&G Bus, Trent Barton and Evolve Bus & Coach. Connections can be made to Cheadle, Burton upon Trent, Stoke-on-Trent, Derby, Stafford, Cannock and Rugeley. Service 406 provides a circular service to surrounding estates. An Alton Towers service also operates during the summer season. The Tesco store acts as an interchange with most services using the bus stop outside the store.

The town is located on the main A50 trunk road between Stoke-on-Trent and Derby.

Uttoxeter was once the terminus of a branch of the Caldon Canal (the Uttoxeter Canal), but most signs of this, apart from an area of Uttoxeter called The Wharf, have been built on. Much of the canal bed was used in the 19th century for the North Staffordshire Railway main line from Uttoxeter to Macclesfield, which has now also disappeared. In 2017 the Caldon & Uttoxeter Canals Trust installed a milepost in the town to mark the former canal terminus. The Trust's website includes a milepost trail along the remains of the canal.

The nearest airport is East Midlands, some 29 miles (47 km) away.

== Public services ==
Policing in Uttoxeter is provided from the Staffordshire Police station in Balance Street. HM Prison Dovegate, in the nearby village of Marchington, is a Category B men's private prison operated by the Serco. HM Prison Sudbury, just over six miles away beyond the Derbyshire boundary, is operated by HM Prison Service as a Category D men's open prison.

The statutory emergency fire and rescue service is provided by the Staffordshire Fire and Rescue Service. Uttoxeter Fire Station is in Cheadle Road in the north of the town.

Uttoxeter has no hospital. It is served by the nearby Queen's Hospital in Burton upon Trent, County Hospital in Stafford, University Hospital of North Staffordshire in Stoke-on-Trent and Royal Derby Hospital. There is no ambulance station, but a team of Rapid Response Paramedics is based here and supported by volunteer Community first responders.

The utility firm South Staffordshire Water manages Uttoxeter's drinking water and Severn Trent its waste water.

== Places of interest ==
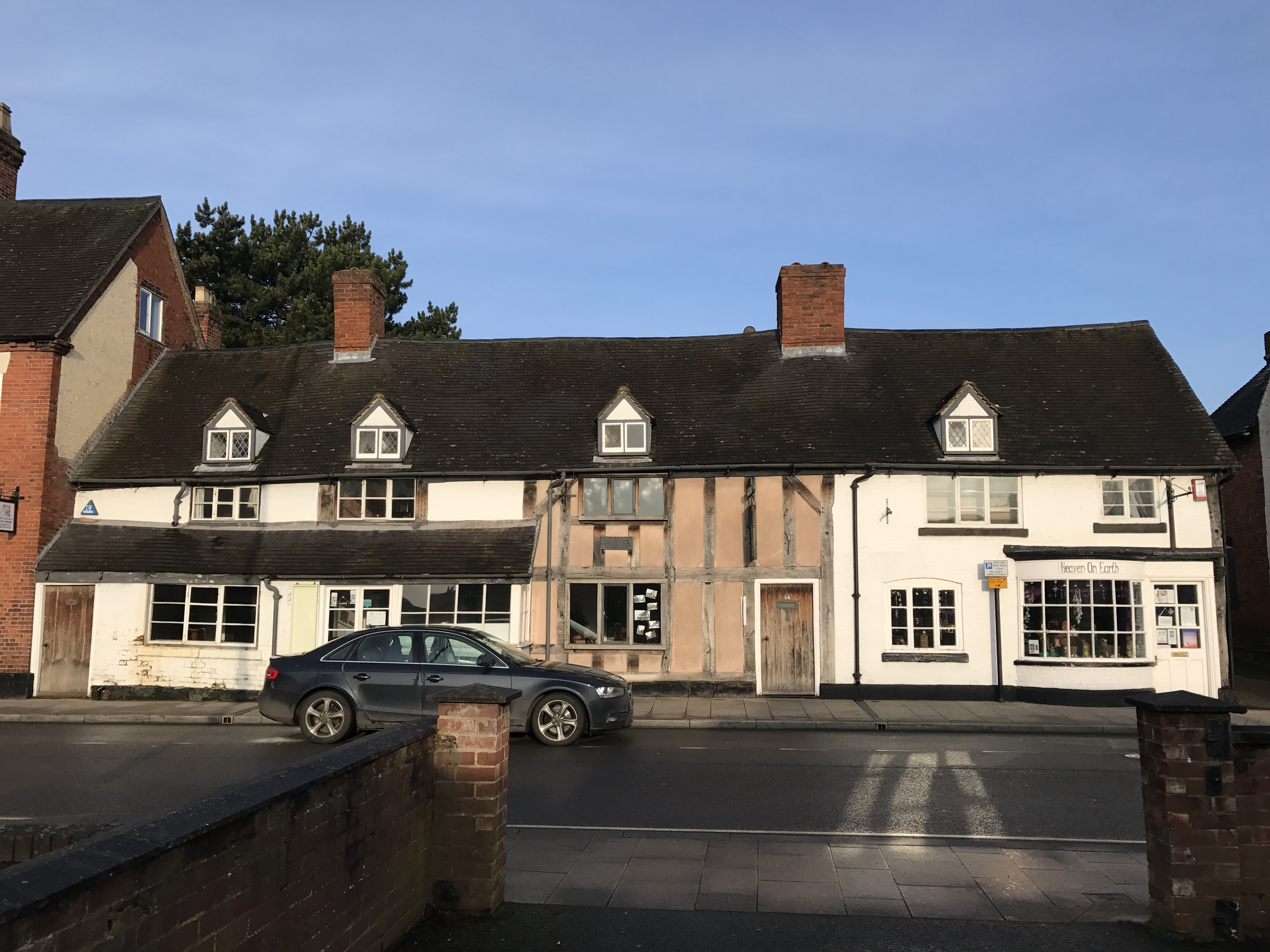
The Museum of Uttoxeter Life, Carter Street

St Mary's Catholic Church in Balance Street was Pugin's first church design. He later worked on Alton Towers and the Houses of Parliament. Three miles north-west of Uttoxeter are the remains of Croxden Abbey, founded in 1176 by Bertram de Verdun for monks of the Cistercian Order. Redfern's Cottage Museum of Uttoxeter Life is in Carter Street and run by volunteers. The restored timber-framed building houses local-history displays, a small gift shop and a cafe.

The town's refurbished Market Place contains the town's main war memorial, as well as the Millennium Monument and the Dr Johnson Memorial. The Wednesday, Friday and Saturday markets are held weekly in the Market Place. In addition there is a monthly Makers' Market.

Smallwood Manor, just over a mile outside the town, was built in 1886 as a country house and formerly housed Smallwood Manor Preparatory School. Smallwood Manor now houses a healthcare centre. The National Trust's Museum of Childhood is located at nearby Sudbury Hall.

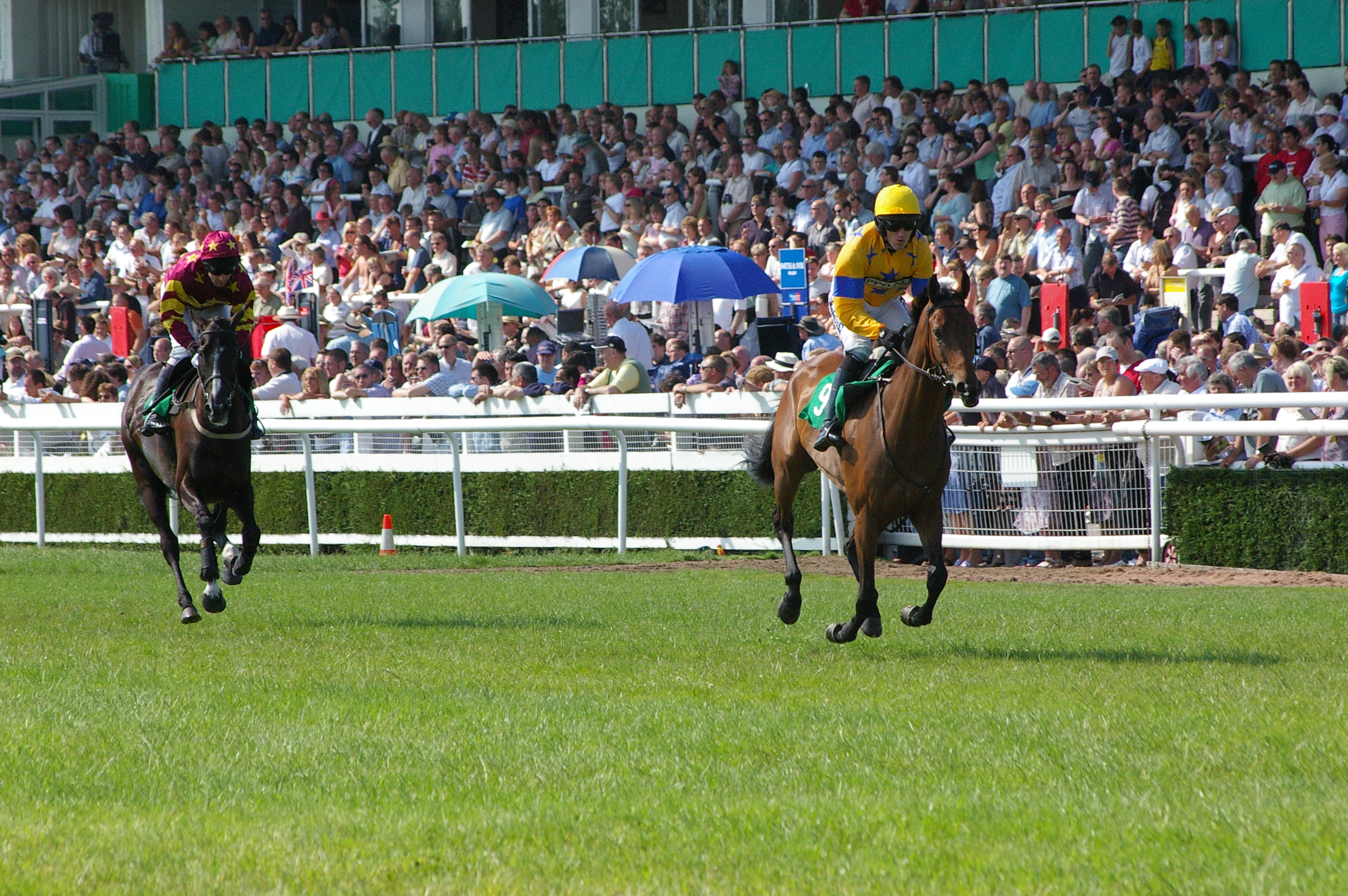
Uttoxeter Racecourse

Bramshall Road Park is the town's recreation ground, with offers tennis courts, skate park, basketball court, football pitch, bowling green and two children's play areas, as well as floral arrangements and the Picknall Brook nature reserve, which can be followed through to the River Dove.

Alton Towers Resort is some 10 miles (16 km) from Uttoxeter. The Peak District National Park is about 20 miles away.

The Uttoxeter Casket, also known as Dr Nelson's Casket, is an Anglo-Saxon reliquary rediscovered in a cottage in Croxden in the mid-19th century. The origin of the casket is unknown but likely the ruined Croxden Abbey. It is currently held at the Museum of Contemporary Art Cleveland, Ohio.

== Media ==
=== Television ===
Uttoxeter lies within the BBC West Midlands and ITV Central both broadcast from the Sutton Coldfield transmitting station. It is also possible to receive BBC East Midlands from the Waltham transmitting station in Leicestershire.

=== Radio ===
Local radio stations are BBC Radio Derby, Greatest Hits Radio Midlands, and Capital Midlands.

=== Newspapers ===
Uttoxeter's newspapers are the Uttoxeter Advertiser (online only, part of the Burton Mail group of local papers), the Uttoxeter Echo, and the community magazine the Shire Standard.

== Culture ==
Uttoxeter Civic Society was re-established in 2004 to act as a civic watchdog and to protect and promote the history and heritage of Uttoxeter.

Each year, Uttoxeter Lions run a beer festival in June, "Lark in the Park", at Bramshall Road Park on August bank holiday and on Bonfire and Fireworks Night in November, and an annual Christmas fair and market known as "Cracker Night".

Uttoxeter Choral Society was founded in 1881, as one of the earliest in the United Kingdom. Its continuity is matched by few other societies.

Uttoxeter was the home of the Acoustic Festival of Britain until it ended in 2019.

=== Television appearances ===
Uttoxeter was the setting of a recurring comedy sketch by comedians Stephen Fry and Hugh Laurie in their BBC television series A Bit of Fry and Laurie.

The town featured in Countryfile, as a "mystery town". Its cattle market featured in the programme as the last in the town centre site in 2005. Local people participated in the programme from the local Uttoxeter Advertiser and Uttoxeter Racecourse staff.

Oldfields Hall Middle School featured in the film A Room for Romeo Brass, written and directed by Shane Meadows and Paul Fraser, two Uxonians who have risen to fame.

Uttoxeter Racecourse has been used several times, as it is visited by residents of the soap opera Coronation Street.

== Religion ==
=== St Mary the Virgin Church ===
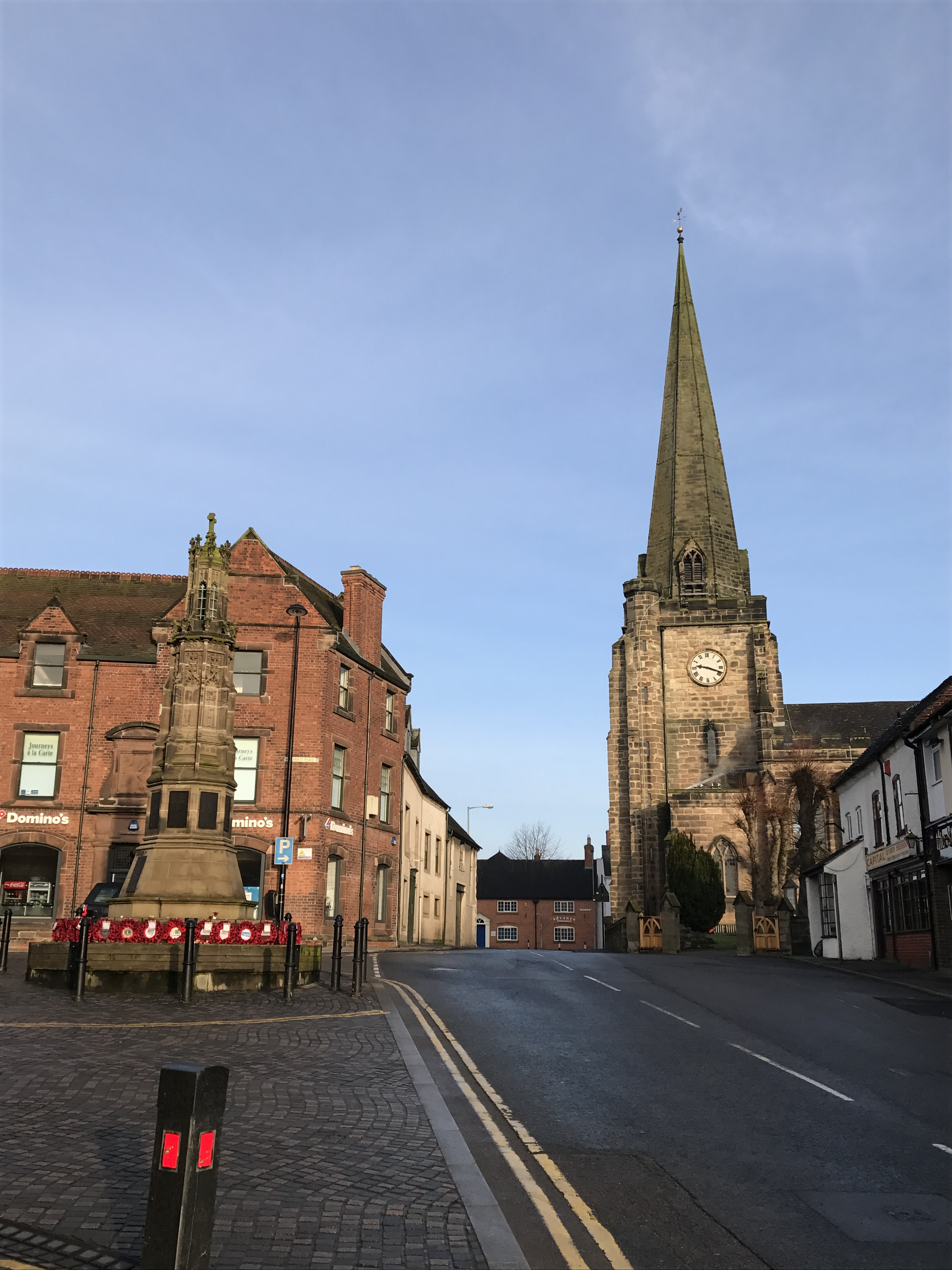
St. Mary the Virgin Church, Church of England

The most prominent religious building in Uttoxeter is the Church of England St Mary the Virgin Church in Church Street. The present structure dates from 1877, but the tower and other parts date from the 14th century. The original church, only the tower of which remains was designed by renowned architect Thomas Yevele who may have lived in the town. There is another Church of England church in The Heath area of the town. Both lie in the parish of Uttoxeter and the Diocese of Lichfield.

=== St Mary's Catholic Church ===
The Roman Catholic church in the town is St Mary's, dating from 1838 and designed by Augustus Pugin. It is part of the Roman Catholic Archdiocese of Birmingham.

=== Other Christian churches ===
Uttoxeter has a Methodist church dating from 1812, a United Reformed church in Carter Street, a Pentecostal Church, a Free Church, and a Kingdom Hall for Jehovah's Witnesses.

=== Non-Christian ===
The nearest mosques and Sikh Gurdwara are in Burton upon Trent, and the nearest synagogue is in Newcastle-under-Lyme. There is however a small prayer room near the town off Derby Road used by multiple faiths.

=== Quaker Meeting House ===
The Uttoxeter Meeting House in Carter Street was built in 1706 and remained in use until the late 1880s. However, it reopened in 1922 and has remained in use since then.

== Education ==
Uttoxeter has a three-tier schooling system: several first schools, three middle schools (Oldfields Hall Middle School, Windsor Park Middle School and Ryecroft Middle School, Rocester) and a high school. All three middle schools were rated Good by Ofsted in 2015–2016. The high school was named as one of the top 10 per cent of schools nationally for Progress at GCSE in 2015. Thomas Alleyne's, has over 1,100 pupils, an astroturf football pitch, swimming pool, gymnasium and several grass football pitches. It is the only high school in Staffordshire to offer a school farm. It includes a sixth form centre, and is one of three schools founded by the 16th-century priest Thomas Alleyne.

Before this educational structure, the town had a selective secondary and grammar-school system consisting of Windsor Park Boys' School, Oldfields Girls' School and Alleyne's Grammar School.

The University of Derby and Staffordshire University (Stoke-on-Trent and Stafford) are the closest higher education institutions.

== Sport ==
Uttoxeter is the home town of Olympic gold medal-winning swimming star Adam Peaty, world record holder for the 50m and 100m breast stroke. In January 2015 he opened the redeveloped Uttoxeter Leisure Centre, which now houses the Adam Peaty swimming pool.

Uttoxeter Cricket Club was formed in 1907. The club played at the Racecourse for 65 years before moving to the disused Marchington Cricket Club in 2019.

Uttoxeter Racecourse, a short walk from the town centre, is home to the annual Midlands Grand National horse race.

Uttoxeter Rugby Club was formed in 1982, when JCB Rugby club began to play at Oldfields sport and social club in Uttoxeter, establishing the first rugby side in a town traditionally associated with association football.

Uttoxeter Town F.C., is also based at Oldfields sports and social club. From 2012, Uttoxeter Town entered the Staffordshire County Senior League, Division 1, and now plays at the Midland League Premier Division. Rocester F.C. plays in the nearby village of Rocester.

Uttoxeter's Manor golf course is a short journey from the town, near the village of Kingstone.

Uttoxeter Leisure Centre in Oldfields Road has a swimming pool, gym and sports hall.

== Notable people ==
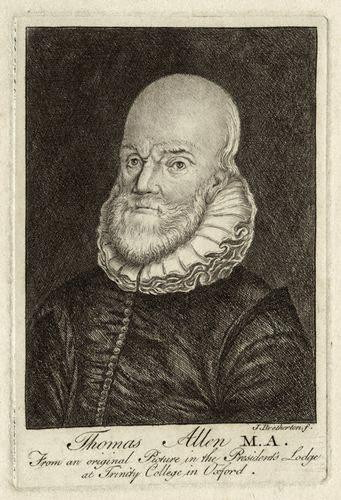
Thomas Allen, late 18C.

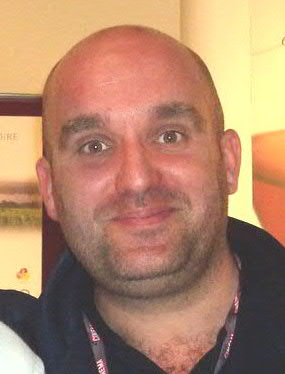
Shane Meadows, 2009

- Thomas Alleyne (c. 1488–1558) priest who founded Thomas Alleyne's High School, Uttoxeter. and Alleyne's Academy, in Stone.
- Thomas Blagrave (died 1590) acting Master of the Revels in 1573–1579.
- Thomas Allen (1542–1632), English mathematician and astrologer was born in the town.
- Sir Simon Degge, (1612–1703) antiquary, wrote notes on Plot's Natural History of Staffordshire.
- Robert Bakewell, (1682–1752) artist and metal worker, was born in the town.
- Alan Gardner, 1st Baron Gardner (1742–1809), who commanded a younger Nelson, was born at the manor house in the town.
- Samuel March Phillipps (1780–1862) civil servant, legal writer and Under-Secretary of State for the Home Department from 1827 to 1848.
- Samuel Bentley (1785–1868) English printer and antiquarian.
- Thomas Kynnersley (1839–1874), naval officer and later MP in New Zealand, was born in town.
- Lewis Hall (1860–1933) became a dental surgeon and politician in British Columbia, Canada.
- Joseph Cyril Bamford (1916–2001), industrialist founder of JCB, was born at what is now the Parks.
- Peter Vaughan (1923–2016) television and film actor, lived in the town and attended Uttoxeter Grammar School.
- Dave Sampson (1941–2014), a rock singer, was born in the town.
- Anthony Bamford (born 1945), a billionaire industrialist and Ferrari collector, son of Joseph Cyril Bamford, was born in Uttoxeter.
- Ruth Gledhill (born 1959), journalist, lived in Gratwich and attended Thomas Alleyne's High School.
- Shane Meadows (born 1972), writer and film director known for This Is England, was born and brought up in Uttoxeter.
- Aaron Jeffcoate (born 1993), actor known for Casualty and The Terror, was brought up and lives in Uttoxeter.

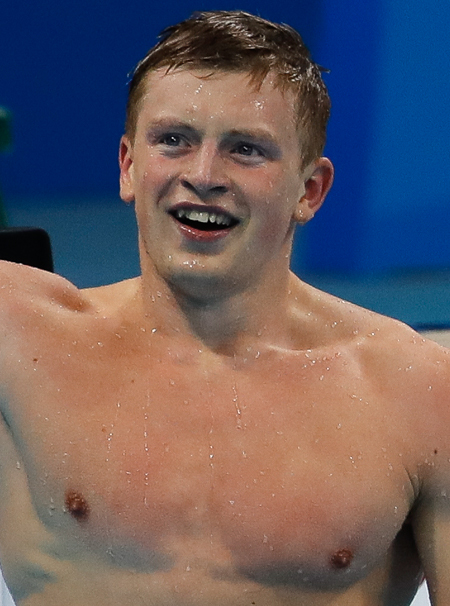
Adam Peaty, 2016

=== Sport ===
- Vincent Blore (1908–1997), football goalkeeper, played for the Uttoxeter Amateurs and several other clubs.
- Roger de Ville (1935–2021) played first class cricket for Derbyshire 1963–1964.
- Bartley Gorman (1944–2002), bare-knuckle boxer, lived for many years in the town and died there.
- Gary Croft (born 1974), footballer, grew up here and attended Alleynes. He was the first English footballer to play whilst wearing an electronic tag. He scored 431 goals.
- Adam Peaty (born 1994), world record holder for the 50 m & 100 m breast stroke and gold medallist at the 2016 and 2020 Summer Olympics

== See also ==
- Dovegate Prison
