= St Mary the Virgin Church, Uttoxeter =

Coordinates: 52.898717°N 1.862825°W

St Mary's
- The Parish Church of Saint Mary the Virgin
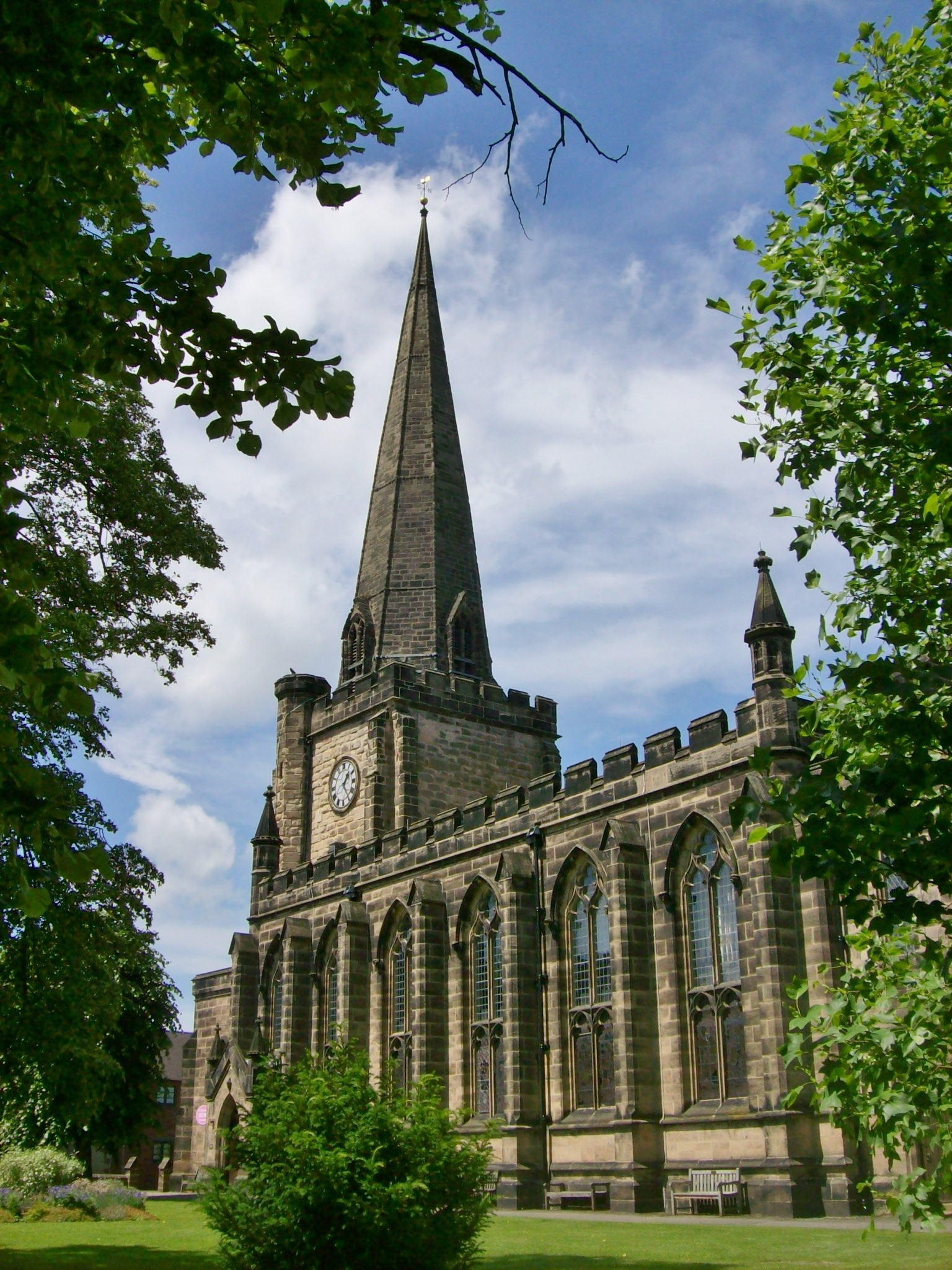
- St Mary's from the south east

- Uttoxeter shown in Staffordshire
- OS grid reference: SK 09328 33485
- Location: Uttoxeter, Staffordshire
- Country: England
- Denomination: Church of England
- Website: uttoxetercofe.org

History
- Dedication: St Mary the Virgin

Architecture
- Heritage designation: Grade II* listed
- Architect: Henry Yevele

Administration
- Province: Province of Canterbury
- Diocese: Diocese of Lichfield
- Archdeaconry: Stoke On Trent
- Deanery: Uttoxeter
- Parish: Uttoxeter

Clergy
- Vicar: Rev Margaret Sherwin

St Mary the Virgin's Church, Uttoxeter, commonly called simply St Mary's, is the parish church of the town of Uttoxeter, Staffordshire, England. Its tower and spire were built in the 14th century. They were designed by renowned architect Henry Yevele; the nave was rebuilt in 1828 and the chancel in 1877. It is a Grade II* listed building.

This is one of two Anglican churches in the parish; the other, also St Mary's, is commonly called "The Heath Mission Church" to avoid confusion.

== History ==
The church was built in the 14th century. By 1828 it was deemed too small so the nave was rebuilt to designs by the architect James Trubshaw. In 1877 the present chancel was built. The chancel was designed by the architect Frederick Josias Robinson of Derby and the contract was Mr. Fryer, also of Derby. The chancel was lengthened by 14 feet (4.3 m) and on the south side over the vestry, a gallery was constructed for the organ, which had formerly been in the west gallery of the church. The east window was preserved and re-erected in the new chancel, along with its original stained glass. The church re-opened on 29 April 1877.

== Administration ==
St Mary's is the main church in the Deanery of Uttoxeter. It is part of the Uttoxeter Area of parishes along with

- Christ Church, Upper Tean
- St Lawrence's Church, Bramshall
- St Mary and All Saints' Church, Checkley
- St Mary the Virgin's Church, Gratwich
- St John the Baptist's Church, Kingstone
- All Saints' Church, Leigh
- St Peter's Church, Marchington
- St John's Church, Marchington Woodlands
- St Michael and All Angels' Church, Stramshall
- Heath Mission Church, Uttoxeter

== Organ ==
The pipe organ was built by William Hill & Sons. A specification of the organ can be found on the National Pipe Organ Register.

== Bells ==
The church tower contains a ring of 8 bells. Of these, 6 date from 1729 and were cast by Abraham Rudhall. The treble and tenor were cast in 1874 by John Warner & Sons.
