= Croxden =

Village in Staffordshire, England

Coordinates: 52°57′N 1°54′W

Croxden is a village in the county of Staffordshire, England, south of Alton and north of Uttoxeter. The population of the civil parish as taken at the 2011 census was 255.

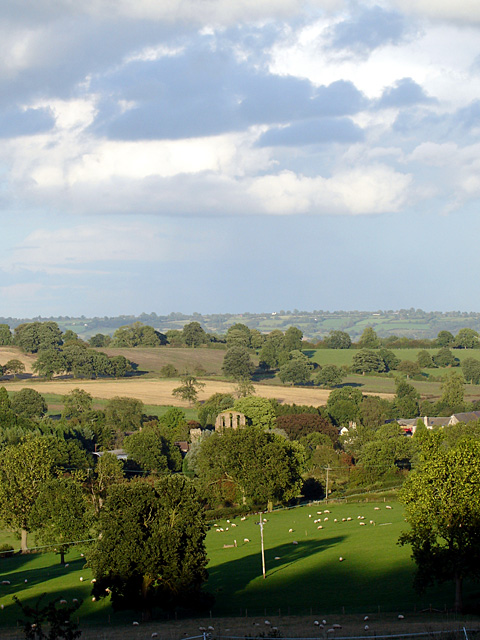
View from towards Croxden Abbey

The village is the site of Croxden Abbey, founded in 1176 by the Cistercians, but now ruined. It is privately owned and in the care of English Heritage. The manor was formerly in the ownership of the Earl of Macclesfield.

== See also ==
- Listed buildings in Croxden
