= Kingstone, Staffordshire =

Village in Staffordshire, England

Coordinates: 52.863378°N 1.911159°W

Kingstone
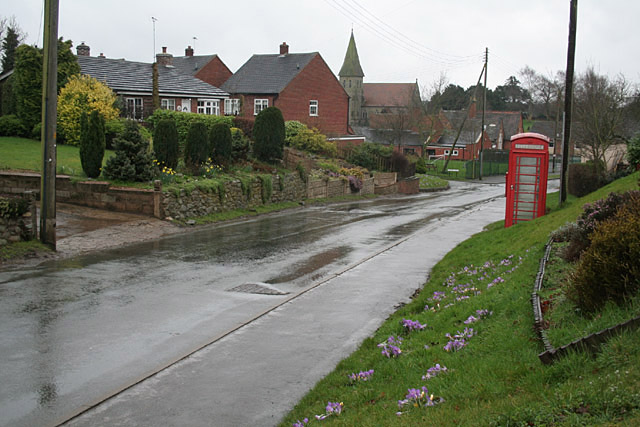
- Uttoxeter Road, Kingstone

- Location within Staffordshire
- Population: 597 (Parish)
- OS grid reference: SK0627
- Civil parish: Kingstone
- District: East Staffordshire
- Shire county: Staffordshire
- Region: West Midlands
- Country: England
- Sovereign state: United Kingdom
- Post town: UTTOXETER
- Postcode district: ST14
- Dialling code: 01889
- Police: Staffordshire
- Fire: Staffordshire
- Ambulance: West Midlands
- UK Parliament: Burton

Kingstone is a village and civil parish within the English county of Staffordshire.

== Population ==
The 2011 census recorded a population of 629 in 249 households. The parish comes under the East Staffordshire Non-Metropolitan District.

== Governance ==
Kingstone is the main settlement in Kingstone Civil Parish which also includes The Blythe and Gratwich.

Kingstone is part of the Bagots ward in the East Staffordshire Borough Council and is represented by Conservative Greg Hall. The Uttoxeter Rural ward in Staffordshire County council is represented by Philip Atkins who is also Conservative.

Kingstone is part of the Lichfield constituency and is represented in the House of Commons of the UK Parliament by David Robertson of the Labour Party.

== Public services ==
Waste collection services are provided by East Staffordshire Borough Council. Water and sewage services are provided by South Staffordshire Water. The distribution network operator for electricity is Central Networks, better known as E.ON UK.

Kingstone has a Stoke-on-Trent (ST) postcode and the postal town is Uttoxeter. The nearest library is in Uttoxeter. Kingstone uses the Uttoxeter (01889) telephone area code.

The nearest police and fire stations are in Uttoxeter.

== History ==
Kingstone became a village in 1862 with the building of the parish church. The population has remained almost static since then.

== Listed buildings ==
There are 14 listed buildings and structures within the parish. This includes two mileposts. All of these are listed at Grade II.

- Blythebridge Mill
- Blythebridge Hill House
- River Blythe Road Bridge
- Callowhill Hall
- Parish Church of Saint John
- Church of St. Mary
- Callowhill Hall
- Church of St Mary
- Various structures near Callowhill Hall
- Manor Farmhouse (Leese Hill)
- Manor Farmhouse, Watery Lane
- Milepost, Kingstone
- Milepost 2, Kingstone
- Milepost 3, Kingstone
- Walnut House
- Wanfield Hall

Kingstone is the home of the Earl of Shrewsbury since 1924. Kingstone is also the resting place of Simon Degge who is the former High Sheriff of Derbyshire.

== Culture and recreation ==
Kingstone has a public house called The Shrewsbury Arms or The Shrew.

Kingstone has a large playing field, tennis court and a play area on Whitehall Close.

== Education ==
Kingstone has a small primary school, Talbot First School, which is used by children up to the age of 8. Kingstone uses the Uttoxeter Middle School system and ears 5–8 attend Oldfields Hall Middle School in Uttoxeter. The area's senior school is Thomas Alleyne's High School which is also in Uttoxeter. The area's further education colleges are Burton College and Stafford College.

== Transport ==
There are two bus stops in the village which are served by Chaserider route 841, Monday to Saturday. The Stafford and Uttoxeter Railway used to run parallel to the village and there was a station at nearby Grindley that closed in 1939. Today the nearest railway stations are Uttoxeter (3.2 miles (5.1 km) away) and Rugeley Trent Valley (6.6 miles (10.6 km) away). The nearest airports are East Midlands 24 miles (38.6 km) and Birmingham 29 miles (46.7 km).

== Media ==
The local newspapers covering the area are the Uttoxeter Advertiser and the Uttoxeter Post and Times. Kingstone receives BBC West Midlands and ITV Central television. Local radio stations in the area are BBC Radio Derby, BBC Radio Stoke, Touch and Signal 1.

== See also ==
- Listed buildings in Kingstone, Staffordshire
