= Newcastle-under-Lyme Borough Council elections =

Local government elections in Staffordshire, England

Newcastle-under-Lyme Borough Council elections are held every four years. Newcastle-under-Lyme Borough Council is the local authority for the non-metropolitan district of Newcastle-under-Lyme in Staffordshire, England. Since the last boundary changes in 2018, 47 councillors have been elected from 21 wards. Prior to 2018 elections were held three years out of every four, with a third of the council elected each time.

== Council elections ==
- 1973 Newcastle-under-Lyme Borough Council election
- 1976 Newcastle-under-Lyme Borough Council election
- 1979 Newcastle-under-Lyme Borough Council election (New ward boundaries)
- 1980 Newcastle-under-Lyme Borough Council election
- 1982 Newcastle-under-Lyme Borough Council election
- 1983 Newcastle-under-Lyme Borough Council election
- 1984 Newcastle-under-Lyme Borough Council election
- 1986 Newcastle-under-Lyme Borough Council election
- 1987 Newcastle-under-Lyme Borough Council election
- 1988 Newcastle-under-Lyme Borough Council election
- 1990 Newcastle-under-Lyme Borough Council election
- 1991 Newcastle-under-Lyme Borough Council election (Borough boundary changes took place but the number of seats remained the same.)
- 1992 Newcastle-under-Lyme Borough Council election
- 1994 Newcastle-under-Lyme Borough Council election
- 1995 Newcastle-under-Lyme Borough Council election
- 1996 Newcastle-under-Lyme Borough Council election
- 1998 Newcastle-under-Lyme Borough Council election
- 1999 Newcastle-under-Lyme Borough Council election
- 2000 Newcastle-under-Lyme Borough Council election
- 2002 Newcastle-under-Lyme Borough Council election (New ward boundaries increased the number of seats by four.)
- 2003 Newcastle-under-Lyme Borough Council election
- 2004 Newcastle-under-Lyme Borough Council election
- 2006 Newcastle-under-Lyme Borough Council election
- 2007 Newcastle-under-Lyme Borough Council election
- 2008 Newcastle-under-Lyme Borough Council election
- 2010 Newcastle-under-Lyme Borough Council election
- 2011 Newcastle-under-Lyme Borough Council election
- 2012 Newcastle-under-Lyme Borough Council election
- 2014 Newcastle-under-Lyme Borough Council election
- 2015 Newcastle-under-Lyme Borough Council election
- 2016 Newcastle-under-Lyme Borough Council election
- 2018 Newcastle-under-Lyme Borough Council election (New ward boundaries and move to whole council elections.)
- 2022 Newcastle-under-Lyme Borough Council election
- 2026 Newcastle-under-Lyme Borough Council election

== Borough result maps ==
2002 results map

2003 results map

2004 results map

2006 results map

2007 results map

2008 results map

2010 results map

2011 results map

2012 results map

2014 results map

2015 results map

2016 results map

2018 results map

2022 results map

2026 results map

== By-election results ==
=== 1998-2002 ===
Thistleberry By-Election 13 June 2002 (3)
Party	Candidate	Votes	%	±%
Liberal Democrats		942		
Liberal Democrats		906		
Liberal Democrats		896		
Labour		473		
Labour		424		
Labour		420		
Conservative		414		
Conservative		412		
Conservative		376		
Independent		57		
Independent		51		
Turnout		5,371	40.4	
Liberal Democrats hold		Swing		
Liberal Democrats hold		Swing		
Liberal Democrats hold		Swing		

=== 2002-2006 ===
Chesterton By-Election 15 August 2002
Party	Candidate	Votes	%	±%
Labour	Michael Dolman	575	66.7	+7.7
Liberal Democrats		178	20.6	+1.4
Conservative		109	12.6	−9.1
Majority		397	46.1	
Turnout		862	17.2	
Labour hold		Swing		

=== 2006-2010 ===
Westlands By-Election 12 July 2007
Party	Candidate	Votes	%	±%
Conservative	Linda Hailstones	696	60.9	+1.2
Liberal Democrats	Michael Shenton	229	20.0	+5.2
Labour	Nicolas Butler	126	11.0	−2.9
UKIP	Daniel Sutton	92	8.0	−3.5
Majority		467	40.9	
Turnout		1,143	24.8	
Conservative hold		Swing		

Butt Lane By-Election 7 February 2008
Party	Candidate	Votes	%	±%
Labour	John MacMillan	295	35.2	+7.9
Liberal Democrats	Dennis Richards	264	31.5	−8.0
Conservative	Sarah Myatt	161	19.2	+10.5
UKIP	Roger Ruddle	117	14.0	−2.3
Majority		31	3.7	
Turnout		837	20	
Labour hold		Swing		

Ravenscliffe By-Election 5 March 2009
Party	Candidate	Votes	%	±%
Conservative	Stephen Blair	229	25.4	−14.5
Labour	Gill Burnett	213	23.6	+1.2
BNP	Sarah Barnes	180	20.0	+20.0
Liberal Democrats	John Parsons	149	16.5	−2.4
UKIP	Geoff Locke	131	14.5	−4.4
Majority		16	1.8	
Turnout		902	26.2	
Conservative hold		Swing		

Seabridge By-Election 4 June 2009
Party	Candidate	Votes	%	±%
Conservative	Ian Gilmore	602	38.4	−10.2
UKIP	Paul Gregory	352	22.5	+5.7
Labour	David Beardmore	310	19.8	−0.2
Liberal Democrats	Mavis Brown	302	19.3	+4.8
Majority		250	15.9	
Turnout		1,566		
Conservative hold		Swing		

Wolstanton By-Election 4 June 2009
Party	Candidate	Votes	%	±%
UKIP	David Woolley	475	31.7	+2.2
Labour	Mark Olszewski	393	26.2	−3.4
Conservative	Nicola Davies	345	23.0	−6.9
Liberal Democrats	Trevor Johnson	285	19.0	+8.2
Majority		82	5.5	
Turnout		1,498		
UKIP gain from Conservative		Swing		

Newchapel By-Election 4 February 2010
Party	Candidate	Votes	%	±%
Conservative	Susan Short	208	33.5	−10.6
UKIP	Carol Lovatt	148	23.8	+10.4
Labour	Kyle Robinson	138	22.2	−1.1
Liberal Democrats	Adrian Rhodes	127	20.5	+1.4
Majority		60	9.7	
Turnout		621		
Conservative hold		Swing		

=== 2010-2014 ===
Newchapel By-Election 27 October 2011
Party	Candidate	Votes	%	±%
Labour	Elsie Bates	248	45.7	+13.0
Conservative	Carl Thomson	160	29.5	+2.2
UKIP	Tricia Harrison	118	21.7	+6.3
Liberal Democrats	Colin Brown	17	3.1	−3.4
Majority		88	16.2	
Turnout		543		
Conservative gain from Labour		Swing		

Madeley By-Election 2 February 2012
Party	Candidate	Votes	%	±%
Liberal Democrats	Simon White	617	47.7	+21.7
Labour	John Smart	342	26.4	−7.9
Conservative	Howard Goodall	294	22.7	−8.9
UKIP	Elaine Blake	41	3.2	−4.8
Majority		275	21.3	
Turnout		1,294		
Liberal Democrats gain from Labour		Swing		

Kidsgrove By-Election 10 May 2012
Party	Candidate	Votes	%	±%
Labour	Terry Turner	639	68.1	+1.8
Conservative	Linda Harold	121	12.9	+0.3
Liberal Democrats	Phil Crank	105	11.2	−0.9
TUSC	Claire Vodrey	73	7.8	−1.2
Majority		518	55.2	
Turnout		938		
Labour hold		Swing		

Silverdale and Parksite By-Election 4 July 2013
Party	Candidate	Votes	%	±%
Labour	Amelia Rout	387	54.3	+7.9
UKIP	Elaine Blake	254	6.9	−6.9
Conservative	James Vernon	58	8.1	−2.9
TUSC	Richard Steele	14	2.0	+2.0
Majority		133	18.7	
Turnout		713		
Labour hold		Swing		

=== 2014-2018 ===
Silverdale and Parksite by-election 4 August 2016
Party	Candidate	Votes	%	±%
Labour	Gareth Snell	399	56.4	+19.5
UKIP	Lynn Dean	174	24.6	−21.2
Conservative	James Vernon	80	11.3	−0.4
Independent	Gary White	54	7.6	+7.6
Majority		225	31.8	
Turnout			22.62	
Labour gain from UKIP		Swing		

Madeley by-election 8 December 2016
Party	Candidate	Votes	%	±%
Independent	Gary White	458	64.8	+64.8
Conservative	David Whitmore	112	15.8	−11.1
Liberal Democrats	Peter Andras	75	10.6	+6.9
Labour	Stephen French	62	8.8	−10.4
Majority		346	48.9	
Turnout		707		
Independent gain from Labour		Swing		

Bradwell by-election 14 December 2017
Party	Candidate	Votes	%	±%
Labour	Andrew Fox-Hewitt	396	50.7	−3.1
Conservative	Gail Benbow	360	46.1	+27.4
Liberal Democrats	Richard Virr	25	3.2	−0.1
Majority		36	4.6	
Turnout		781		
Labour hold		Swing		

Bradwell by-election 14 December 2017
Party	Candidate	Votes	%	±%
Conservative	Jill Waring	216	43.3	−6.3
Labour	Angela Cooper	197	39.5	−10.9
Independent	Nigel Morgan	86	17.2	+17.2
Majority		19	3.8	
Turnout		499		
Conservative gain from Labour		Swing		

=== 2018-2022 ===
Holditch and Chesterton by-election 21 March 2019
Party	Candidate	Votes	%	±%
Independent	Kenneth Owen	282	40.3	+23.2
Labour	Peter Radford	268	38.3	−13.9
UKIP	Mark Barlow	86	12.3	+2.6
Conservative	Lawrence Whitworth	49	7.0	−8.3
SDP	Carol Lovatt	14	2.0	N/A
Majority		14	2.0	
Turnout			17.1	
Independent gain from Labour		Swing		

Knutton By-Election 25 November 2021
Party	Candidate	Votes	%	±%
Conservative	Derrick Huckfield	188	51.1	+25.8
Labour	Steph Talbot	180	48.9	−25.8
Majority		8	2.2	
Turnout		371	18.34	
Conservative gain from Labour		Swing		

=== 2022-2026 ===
Audley by-election 7 September 2023
Party	Candidate	Votes	%	±%
Labour	Rebekah Lewis	732	46.1	−2.7
Conservative	Sally Rudd	438	27.6	−10.9
Liberal Democrats	Andrew Wemyss	355	22.4	+9.7
Independent	Duran O'Dwyer	63	4.0	+4.0
Majority		294	18.5	
Turnout		1,588		
Labour hold		Swing		

Knutton by-election 7 September 2023
Party	Candidate	Votes	%	±%
Labour	Robert Moss	153	49.0	+1.1
Conservative	Derrick Huckfield	99	31.7	−2.8
Liberal Democrats	Aidan Jenkins	60	19.2	+19.2
Majority		54	17.3	
Turnout		312		
Labour hold		Swing		

Madeley and Betley by-election 4 July 2024 (2 seats)
Party	Candidate	Votes	%	±%
Conservative	Mandy Berrisford	1,164		
Conservative	Jill Whitmore	1,084		
Independent	Tanya Morgan	1,066		
Labour	Tony Kearon	856		
Labour	Claire Radford	736		
Conservative hold		Swing		
Conservative hold		Swing		

Town by-election 23 January 2025
Party	Candidate	Votes	%	±%
Labour	Sheelagh Casey-Hulme	309	39.9	−28.4
Conservative	Elliott Lancaster	226	29.2	−2.5
Reform	Neill Walker	168	21.7	+21.7
Liberal Democrats	Nigel Jones	71	9.2	+9.2
Majority		83	10.7	
Turnout		774		
Labour hold		Swing		

Knutton by-election 1 May 2025
Party	Candidate	Votes	%	±%
Reform	Lynn Dean	281	59.9	+59.9
Labour	Bayley Dickin	123	26.2	−22.8
Conservative	Finn Swain	65	13.9	−17.8
Majority		158	33.7	
Turnout		469		
Reform gain from Labour		Swing		

Loggerheads by-election 1 May 2025
Party	Candidate	Votes	%	±%
Conservative	Andrew Turnock	932	70.5	+5.2
Labour	Jeff Love	390	29.5	−5.2
Majority		542	41.0	
Turnout		1,322		
Conservative hold		Swing		

=== 2026-2030 ===
Town by-election 8 October 2026
Party	Candidate	Votes	%	±%
Labour	Andrew Fox-Hewitt	431	46.2	
Reform	Adam Griffiths	249	26.7	
Green	Mark Jones	115	12.3	
Conservative	Conna Eynon	110	11.8	
Liberal Democrats	Morgan Inwood	27	2.9	
Majority		182	19.5	
Turnout		932		
Labour gain from Reform		Swing		
