= Gareth Snell =

British politician (born 1986)

Gareth Snell MP
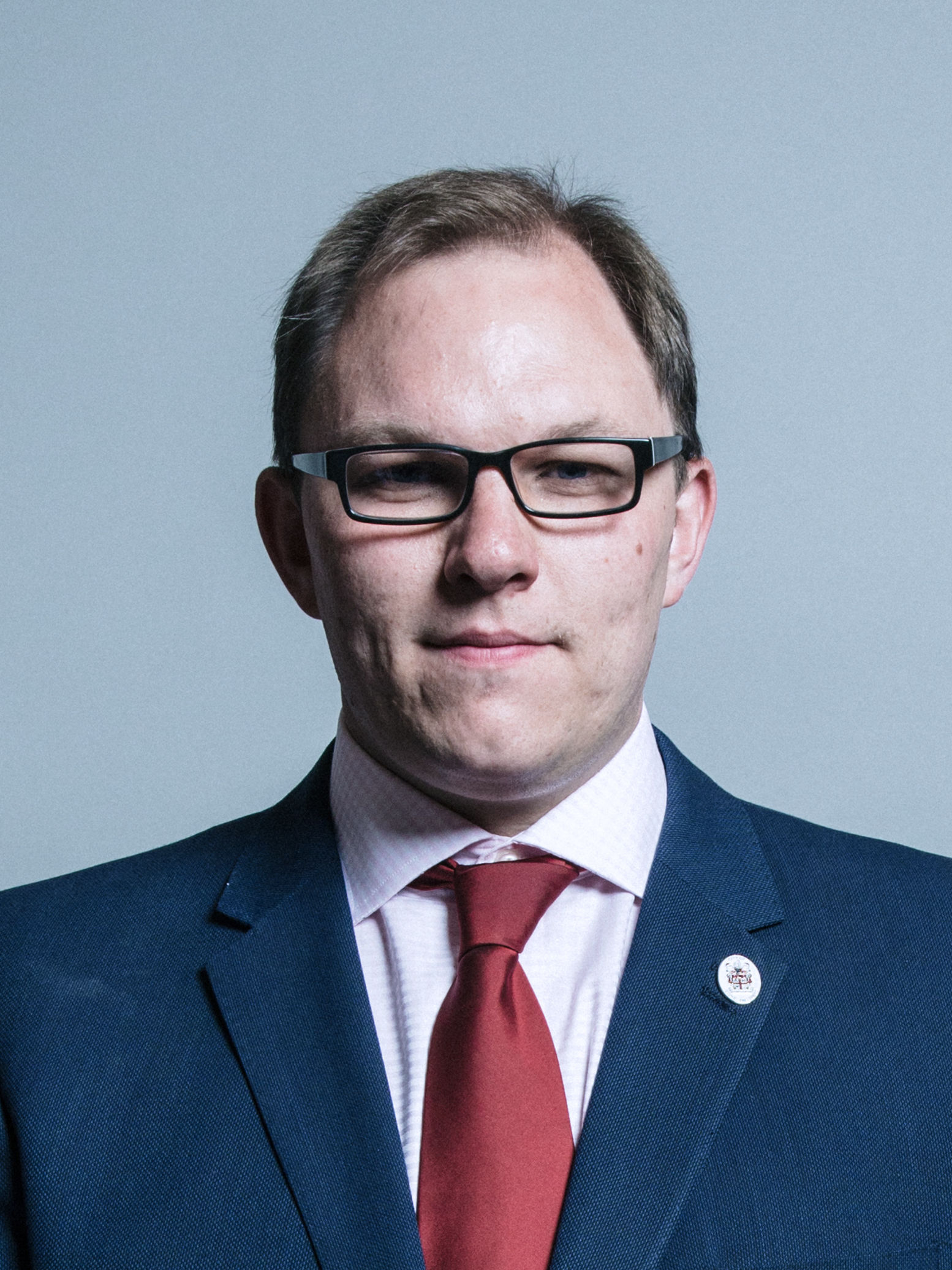
- Official portrait, 2017

Member of Parliament for Stoke-on-Trent Central
- Incumbent
- Assumed office 4 July 2024
- Preceded by: Jo Gideon
- Majority: 6,409 (18.2%)
- In office 23 February 2017 – 6 November 2019
- Preceded by: Tristram Hunt
- Succeeded by: Jo Gideon

Leader of Newcastle-under-Lyme Borough Council
- In office 16 May 2012 – 4 June 2014
- Preceded by: Stephen Sweeney
- Succeeded by: Mike Stubbs

Member of Newcastle-under-Lyme Borough Council
- In office 4 August 2016 – 6 May 2018
- Ward: Silverdale and Parksite
- Preceded by: Eileen Braithwaite
- Succeeded by: Ward abolished
- In office 6 May 2010 – 22 May 2014
- Ward: Knutton and Silverdale
- Preceded by: Richard Gorton
- Succeeded by: Derrick Huckfield

Personal details
- Born: Gareth Craig Snell; 1 January 1986 (age 40) Stowmarket, Suffolk, England
- Party: Labour Co-op
- Spouse: Ruth Anderson (m. 2025)
- Education: Stowmarket High School
- Alma mater: Keele University
- Website: www.garethsnell.org.uk

Gareth Craig Snell (born 1 January 1986) is a British politician who serves as Member of Parliament (MP) for Stoke-on-Trent Central. He regained the seat at the 2024 general election having represented it from 2017 to 2019. A member of Labour Co-op, he was Leader of Newcastle-under-Lyme Borough Council from 2012 to 2014.

== Early and personal life ==
Snell was educated at Stowmarket High School in Suffolk, and graduated from Keele University in 2008 after studying History and Politics. Snell served as general secretary of the Students' Union and founded Keele Labour Students.

In May 2025, Snell married former Labour MP and life peer Ruth Smeeth in Gibraltar.

== Political career ==
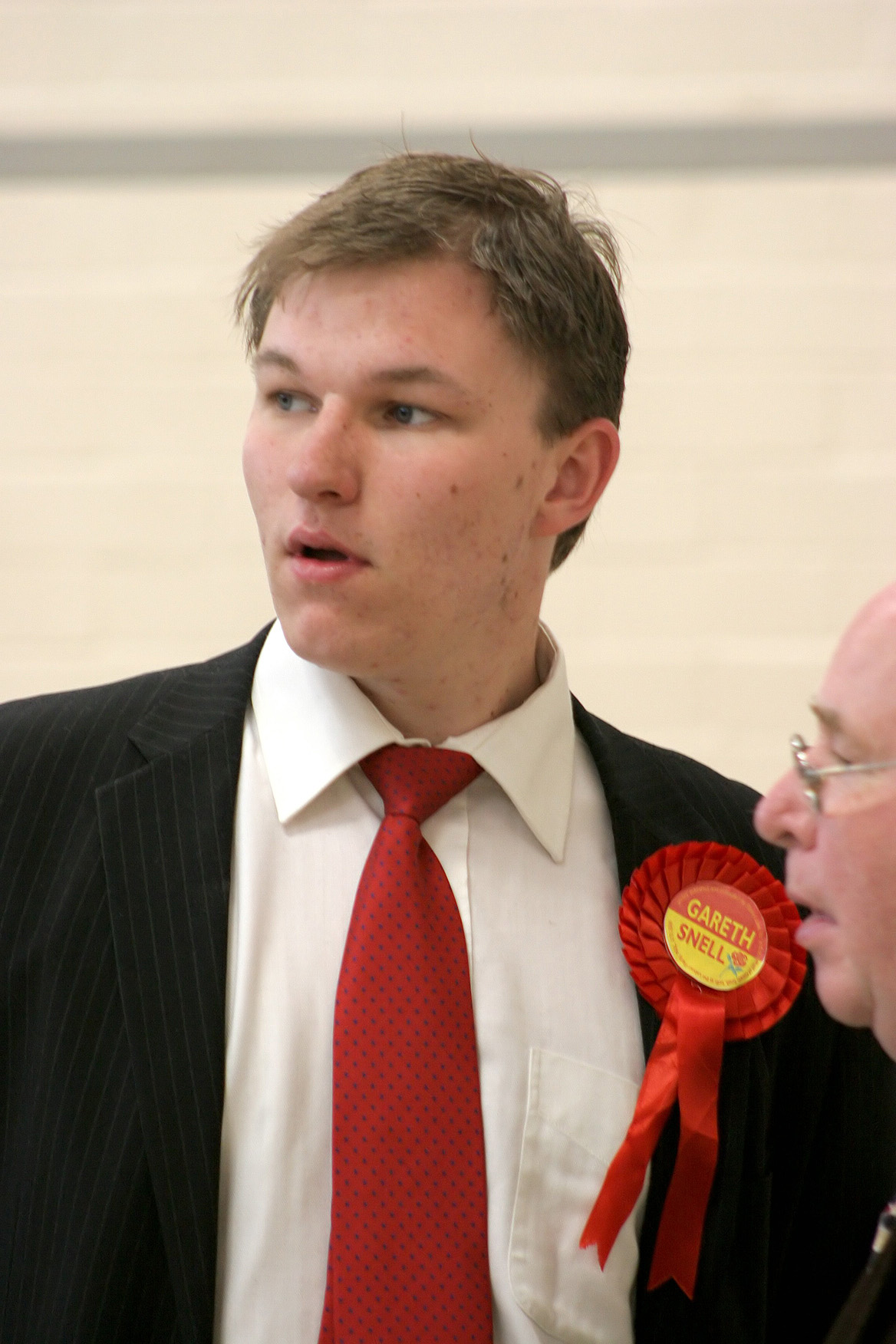
Snell in 2007

Snell unsuccessfully stood for election to Newcastle-under-Lyme Borough Council in 2007 and 2008, but was finally elected to represent Knutton and Silverdale ward in May 2010. He was elected as the Leader of the Council after Labour won a majority at the 2012 local elections. During his tenure, the council became a living wage employer, joined the Co-operative Council network and implemented a 'no redundancies' policy. Seeking re-election in Chesterton ward, Snell's leadership came to an end upon narrowly losing to the UKIP candidate in May 2014. However, he returned as a councillor in a by-election for Silverdale and Parksite ward in August 2016, and served until his term expired in May 2018.

In January 2017, Snell was selected as the Labour Party candidate in the Stoke-on-Trent Central by-election, triggered following the resignation of Tristram Hunt. Held on 23 February, he won the seat with a reduced vote share but saw off a challenge from UKIP leader Paul Nuttall.

He was re-elected with a majority of nearly 4,000 in the general election on 8 June 2017. This was an increase of the figure of 2,600 at the by-election, but compares to 20,000 from 1997. Snell lost his seat in the 2019 general election to Conservative Jo Gideon, predicting his defeat even before his result was announced on BBC television.

Snell regained the seat in the general election of July 2024. He received 14,950 votes, representing 42.4% share of the vote. His nearest rival received 8,541 votes.

=== Political views ===
Snell supported Remain in the 2016 EU referendum, but opposed a second referendum and supported an exit deal to avoid leaving without one.

=== West Midlands mayoral election ===
Between 2020 and 2021, Snell was campaign manager for the Member of Parliament (MP) for Birmingham Hodge Hill, Liam Byrne in the 2021 West Midlands mayoral election, where Byrne lost. Snell was in charge of managing volunteers and staff, as well as coordinating messaging and fundraising.

Parliament of the United Kingdom
Preceded by Tristram Hunt	Member of Parliament for Stoke-on-Trent Central; 2017–2019	Succeeded by Jo Gideon
Preceded by Jo Gideon	Member of Parliament for Stoke-on-Trent Central; 2024–present	Incumbent
