= Edward Kelly (headmaster) =

English headteacher (1960–1983)

Captain Edward Kelly
- Edward Kelly in 1970
- Born: October 10, 1919; West Derby, Lancashire, England
- Died: July 14, 2005 (aged 85); Enfield, Middlesex, England
- Education: Liverpool University (B.Sc)
- Occupations: Educator, Headteacher
- Known for: Headteacher of The Latymer School (1970–1983)
- Spouse: Dorothy Molyneux (m. 1954)
- Edward Kelly's voice Recorded 1979-80

Edward Stanley Kelly (10 October 1919 – 14 July 2005) was a British educator who served as the headteacher of The Latymer School in Edmonton, from 1970 to 1983. He was also the first headteacher of Biddulph Grammar School (now known as Woodhouse Middle School) and had a distinguished career in teaching and the military. Kelly was known for his progressive reforms, including the abolition of streaming and the prefect system, and the establishment of an elected school council at Latymer.

== Early life and education ==
Edward Kelly was born on 10 October 1919 in West Derby, Lancashire. His father, Stanley Cowan Kelly, emigrated from the Isle of Man and worked as a cotton warehouse worker, while his mother, Maud Isabel Kelly (née Garrett), was a housewife. He also had a younger brother named Douglas Kelly. The family settled in Kirkdale, an inner northern suburb of Liverpool.

Growing up in the 1920s and early 1930s, Kelly experienced first-hand the poverty and deprivation of the inter-war years. He attended a local elementary school in Kirkdale, the same school his mother had attended a generation earlier. Despite dingy conditions and classes of 40 or more, he received a rigorous education from "forceful teachers" who emphasized numeracy and mathematical problem-solving. It was here he also began learning the violin. This school, along with St Mary's Church in Kirkdale, where he was involved in the scout movement, profoundly influenced his moral and spiritual development and fostered an interest in voluntary social service.

In March 1930, Kelly entered the Liverpool Institute on a junior city scholarship. He was originally a member of Cochran House and followed a scientific curriculum, eventually joining the Science Sixth (6aSc). During his tenure, he was appointed a school prefect for houses Cochran and Owen, and held several other roles in school societies, notably serving as a member of the Literary and Debating Society.

Kelly was a prominent distance runner for the school's cross-country team. He was appointed team Secretary for the 1936–37 season and Captain for the 1937–38 season, during which he was awarded Full Colours. He also competed in gymnastics, earning Half-Colours and placing fourth in the school's individual championship in 1936. A member of the school orchestra and Choral Society, he was known among his peers for his eccentric fashion, specifically his "vivid ties" and "ghoulish pullovers." Despite the economic hardship of the 1930s, Kelly was able to attend the University of Liverpool. He studied in the Faculty of Science, where he graduated with honours from the School of Zoology, completing his B.Sc. Honours (Part 2) in 1941.

During World War II, Kelly applied his mathematical training to the war effort, working on radar. He served in the Royal Army Ordnance Corps and later the Royal Electrical and Mechanical Engineers, achieving the rank of captain.

== Career ==
=== Early career (1945–1960) ===
Following his demobilisation, Kelly began his teaching career in September 1946 when he joined the Mathematical Staff at Liverpool College, a public school for boys. Beyond his academic duties, Kelly became deeply involved in the school's extracurricular life. He was noted for coaching tennis and long-distance running, playing for the masters' hockey team, and leading "camp fire" style sing-songs during student trips, such as a walking tour of the Lake District in 1949. His past in the army's Radar branch was reflected in his co-supervising a Science Society visit to the Wallasey Landing Stage radar station in 1950.

Kelly's career at the college saw a steady progression of responsibilities. In February 1948, he was appointed Assistant Housemaster of Brook's House. Two years later, in September 1949, he was promoted to Housemaster of Brook's, a position he would hold for five years. He was also a prominent figure in the school's scouting movement, described upon his departure as the "doyen of College scouting" and holding the rank of Assistant Commissioner.

At Christmas 1954, Kelly left Liverpool College to take up the post of Senior Mathematics Master at Douglas High School for Boys on the Isle of Man, a large institution that had been reorganised on comprehensive lines. His departure was marked by tributes in the college magazine, which praised him as a "conscientious, kindly, and just" Housemaster whose "personal integrity and high standards were an inspiration to all who worked with him and under him".

=== Biddulph Grammar School (1960–1970) ===
In 1960, at the age of 40, Edward Kelly was appointed the first headteacher of the new Biddulph Grammar School, a two-stream co-educational school in a small Staffordshire mining town. The school opened with just 60 pupils but grew rapidly, reaching 333 pupils with its first upper and lower sixth forms established by 1965.

Under Kelly's leadership, the school became a pioneer of educational innovation in the 1960s. Notably, it established German as its first modern foreign language and Russian as its second, an unusual choice when French was dominant. Kelly defended the teaching of Russian not as an endorsement of communism, but as a practical necessity for understanding a dominant world power and accessing the "vast amount of scientific and technological literature... pouring freely out of Russia." This focus was supported by the installation of a 30-booth language laboratory in 1963, one of the first in the county.

The school embraced a wide range of modern teaching methods, including the Nuffield approach to science and the Midlands Mathematical Experiment for "new mathematics". Kelly fostered a progressive school ethos, championing co-education by allowing pupils to "swop" traditional courses, with boys taking domestic science and girls taking metalwork and engineering drawing. He was a strong advocate for girls' education, stating, "Educate a boy and you educate a man, educate a girl and you educate a family."

The school's success was reflected in its sixth form retention rate. While the building was designed with the assumption that 25% of pupils would stay on, by 1968 the actual figure was 70%. During his tenure, Kelly also campaigned successfully for a school swimming pool and was actively involved in the community, chairing the management committee of a new local youth centre. He frequently contributed to national educational debates, speaking at the Headmasters' Association conference on topics such as the expansion of higher education.

Kelly's lasting influence on his pupils was noted in the House of Commons in June 1989. During a debate on litter, Joan Walley, the MP for Stoke-on-Trent North, paid tribute to Kelly as her former headmaster. She recalled how he had "instilled in all his pupils the idea that it was wrong to drop litter," specifically instructing them to carry wrappers in their pockets or take them home rather than discarding them in the street.

=== The Latymer School (1970–1983) ===
In 1970, Kelly transitioned back to a larger institutional setting when he was appointed headteacher of The Latymer School in Edmonton, a position he held until 1983. Upon his arrival, he was faced with a curriculum that was perceived as "old-fashioned." He embarked on a series of reforms, often implementing changes gradually and building upon the foundation laid by his predecessor, Dr. Trefor Jones.

A significant reform was the complete abolition of streaming by ability, which he deemed "unsuitable" for a school already attracting high-ability pupils. Kelly believed that streaming caused undue stress among cleverer students who might be forced into subjects for which they had little aptitude, and conversely, it could deny opportunities to less academically inclined pupils who showed strong aptitude in other areas. Another radical decision was the abolition of the traditional prefect system. Kelly's conviction was that all sixth formers were "sufficiently mature and responsible" to contribute to the running of the school, thus reserving special powers and status only for the Head Boy, Head Girl, and their deputies, a change he felt made the system fairer by avoiding arbitrary choices.

In 1970, Kelly also instigated the creation of an elected School Council, a large body comprising 84 members, with one boy and one girl elected from each of the six house registration groups. While acknowledging the headmaster's ultimate legal responsibility under common law (in loco parentis), the Council served as an important "forum" for pupils to express their views. Kelly emphasized its advisory role in his annual address to the Council each September, affirming that ultimate democratic power resided with Parliament. Curriculum development under Kelly included encouraging the extension of Nuffield science and "new mathematics," and incorporating the then-new Certificate of Secondary Education examinations to provide more appropriate education for pupils for whom the General Certificate of Education courses were deemed too academic.

He also strengthened the House system, distributing new entrants into six named House units. These units served as a channel for seniors to mentor juniors in various activities, fostering leadership and a strong sense of community. Furthermore, with new school extensions opening in 1966 providing dedicated common rooms, sixth formers were granted greater freedom and responsibility, which led to the formation of a Sixth Form Common Room Committee. Regarding daily acts of worship, Kelly offered an alternative daily sixth-form assembly that was not an act of worship, eventually settling on two weekly assemblies held in the Lecture Theatre, which served as a forum for discussion on various themes.

==== Navigating political controversy ====
Kelly's headship coincided with a period of heightened political tension, which manifested directly within the school. In 1974, he gave permission for National Front organiser Martin Webster to address a sixth-form General Studies class. This decision prompted a demonstration of approximately 300 students and protesters outside the school, which required a police presence. Kelly defended his decision on educational grounds, arguing, "It is good for everybody to put their views forward to questioning." To provide context and balance, he then arranged for speakers from the main political parties and the Board of British Jews to address students in the subsequent weeks. Kelly also publicly acknowledged that he had received protests from "a small number of Jewish parents" and that his "reaction was full of understanding."

Several years later, in 1978, the school faced further media attention. A sixth-form student, who was a youth organiser for the National Front, attracted considerable publicity after taking an unauthorised absence to appear at a party press conference. Kelly's public response focused on school discipline and institutional neutrality. He confirmed that the pupil had broken school rules and would be required to "make up the time," but stated the matter would be dealt with "with the dignity that a sixth-former deserves." In a radio interview on LBC, Kelly reiterated a school-wide policy that buildings and amenities "must not be used for the dissemination of political propaganda distinctive of any party." He stated that while he wanted pupils to be "politically aware," he would take "positive action" if any activity was "prejudicial to the good order and running and good feeling in this school."

==== Leadership style and legacy ====
Kelly was renowned for his prodigious work ethic, being a constant presence at the school from early morning until late evening, often taking a small suitcase of work home to complete tasks that remained unfinished during the day. Despite his ultimate authority, he displayed humility, frequently sought advice from colleagues, and was remembered for his positive nature and a ready sense of humour, though he never shied away from confronting staff who presumed to trespass on his authority. He firmly believed that "every child matters," demonstrating this by personally meeting all lower sixth formers in small groups to get to know them. His singing voice was a notable feature during school assemblies, which in that era commonly included hymn singing.

During his 13-year tenure, Edward Kelly navigated The Latymer School through a period that included serious attempts by the Labour government to abolish grammar school status, and he is widely credited with leaving the school in a significantly stronger position than it had been upon his arrival in 1970.

== Personal life ==
Edward Kelly maintained a profound Christian faith throughout his life, serving as a Reader in the Church of England from 1947. At St Paul's Church, Winchmore Hill, he served as a Lay Preacher, authored St. Paul's Church, Winchmore Hill in 1987, a parish history book, and was a Trustee for the St. Paul's Winchmore Hill Trust in 1987.

He married Dorothy Molyneux in July 1954 and together they had children. He had a strong appreciation for music and the arts, reflected in his love of music and his participation in school choirs. Kelly was also active in Rotary for many years and was awarded the Paul Harris Fellowship in recognition of his service. He served as assistant secretary of the Rotary Club of Edmonton.

== Retirement and death ==
In retirement, Edward Kelly remained a dedicated supporter of The Latymer School. He regularly attended school events, took an active interest in its history and traditions, and offered support to his successors. He remained active in his final years and was a guest of the school at its Founders' Day celebration in May 2005. Edward Kelly died on 14 July 2005 in Winchmore Hill at the age of 85.

== Bibliography ==
- Morris, Joseph Acton (1975). A History of The Latymer School at Edmonton. The Latymer Foundation at Edmonton. ISBN 978-0-9504862-0-8.
