= Stoke by-election =

Stoke by-election may refer to:

- 1953 Stoke-on-Trent North by-election
- 2017 Stoke-on-Trent Central by-election
