= Joan Walley =

British politician (born 1949)

Member of the Electoral Commission for the Labour Party
- Incumbent
- Assumed office 1 November 2018
- Nominated by: Jeremy Corbyn
- Preceded by: Bridget Prentice

Chair of the Environmental Audit Select Committee
- In office 10 June 2010 – 30 March 2015
- Preceded by: Tim Yeo
- Succeeded by: Huw Irranca-Davies

Member of Parliament for Stoke-on-Trent North
- In office 11 June 1987 – 30 March 2015
- Preceded by: John Forrester
- Succeeded by: Ruth Smeeth

Personal details
- Born: Joan Lorraine Walley; 23 January 1949 (age 77) Stoke-on-Trent, Staffordshire, England
- Party: Labour
- Spouse: Jan Ostrowski (m. 1981)
- Children: 2
- Education: Biddulph Grammar School
- Alma mater: University of Hull (BA)

Joan Lorraine Walley (born 23 January 1949) is a British Labour Party politician, who served as Member of Parliament (MP) for Stoke-on-Trent North from the 1987 general election until 2015.

== Early life ==
She attended Biddulph Grammar School (now known as Woodhouse Middle School) in Biddulph, north Staffordshire, where she studied German under headteacher Edward Kelly. At the University of Hull, she gained a BA in Social Administration. From the University College of Wales, Swansea, she gained a Diploma in Community Work Development. From 1970 to 1973, she worked on an Alcoholics Recovery Project. From 1974 to 1978, she was a Local Government Officer for Swansea City Council. She worked for Wandsworth Council from 1978 to 1979. From 1979 to 1982, she was a Development Officer for NACRO.

== Parliamentary career ==
Following the deselection of her predecessor John Forrester, she stood as the Labour Party candidate for Stoke-on-Trent North (the second female MP for the seat after Harriet Slater) and became the constituency's Member of Parliament (MP) at the 1987 general election. Walley had previously been a Lambeth councillor.

She was elected by the House to be the Chair of the Environmental Audit Committee on 9 June 2010.

In November 2013 she announced her intention to stand down at the next general election in 2015. Walley became a member of the Electoral Commission in 2018.

== Personal life ==
She married Jan Ostrowski in 1981; the couple have two sons; Daniel, born 1981, and Tom, born 1983. Walley is a supporter of Port Vale, the football club in her constituency.

Parliament of the United Kingdom
| Preceded by John Forrester | Member of Parliament for Stoke-on-Trent North; 1987–2015 | Succeeded by Ruth Smeeth |
