= 2008 Newcastle-under-Lyme Borough Council election =

2008 English local government election

Map of the 2008 Newcastle-under-Lyme Borough Council election

The 2008 Newcastle-under-Lyme Borough Council election took place on 1 May 2008 to elect a third of the members of Newcastle-under-Lyme Borough Council, the council of Newcastle-under-Lyme in England. This was on the same day as the other 2008 United Kingdom local elections. The previous council election took place in 2007 and the following election was held in 2010. In the election, the council stayed under no overall control.

== Results ==
Party	Previous	Seats +/-	2008
Conservative	20	▲5	25
Liberal Democrat	18	▲1	19
Labour	20	▼8	12
UKIP	2	▲2	4

== See also ==
- Newcastle-under-Lyme Borough Council elections
