= St Paul's Church, Winchmore Hill =

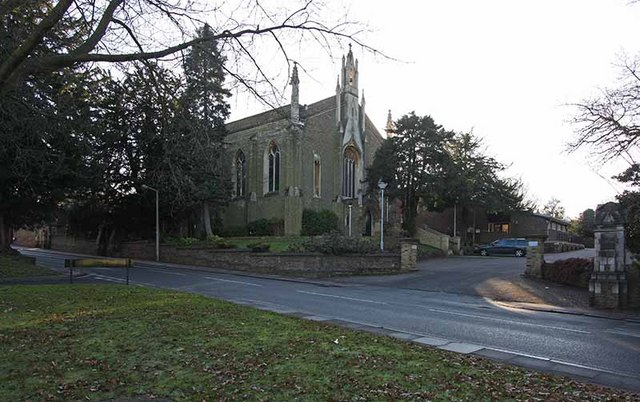
- St Paul's Church, Winchmore Hill, London N21
- St Paul's Church, Winchmore Hill
- 51.6354°N 0.1059°W
- Location: Winchmore Hill, London Borough of Enfield
- Country: England
- Website: Official website

History
- Dedication: Saint Paul
- Consecrated: 1828

Architecture
- Architect: J. Davies
- Style: Commissioners' Gothic
- Completed: 1827

Administration
- Diocese: London
- Deanery: Enfield
- Parish: Winchmore Hill

Clergy
- Vicar: Daniel Sandham

St Paul's Church is a Church of England parish church in Winchmore Hill, in the London Borough of Enfield. It was built between 1826 and 1827 and consecrated in 1828 as a chapel of ease to All Saints Church, Edmonton. The church is one of the "Waterloo churches" constructed with assistance from the Church Building Commissioners to provide for the expanding urban population after the Napoleonic Wars. It stands on Church Hill and is a listed building within the Winchmore Hill conservation area.

== History ==
The site was donated by Walker Gray of Southgate Grove, later Grovelands. The Church Building Commissioners funded about three-quarters of the construction cost, part of a wider programme during a period of economic depression. The design, attributed to J. Davies, followed the simple and functional style associated with early Commissioners’ churches.

The building was originally a plain rectangular nave without pillars to ensure clear sight lines. The roof is supported by queen post trusses spanning 45 feet, which was among the widest spans in the London Diocese at the time. Exterior fittings include cast iron rainwater hoppers bearing a cross, produced at the London Iron Foundry in St John’s Wood.

=== Early interior ===
In its early years, the nave walls were whitewashed, the windows curtained, and lighting provided by candles. The pulpit was centrally positioned, and music was supplied by a barrel organ with a finger-board, operated from a small rear gallery. Heating came from two stoves in the aisles, which overheated nearby seats while leaving others cold. Box pews with doors were either rented or free, the former marked with brass-framed name cards and the latter with a black cross painted at each end. Marks from these fittings remain visible. In 1851 the church became a separate parish.

=== Victorian alterations (1844–1907) ===
A vestry fire in 1844 damaged the east end of the church. In 1846, a carved oak altar and pulpit were installed. In the late 1840s, stained glass depicting twelve scenes from the life of St Paul was added to the east window. The designs, possibly by Ward and Nixon or Ward and Hughes, specified expressions for each figure and used facial colours to indicate different ethnic origins. In each scene, St Paul is shown wearing a purple garment following his conversion.

Gas lighting was installed in the nave in 1864, preceding public gas lighting in the village by 15 years. A hand-blown organ was added in 1876, located in the nave, and in 1882 the box pews were replaced.

In 1889 the apse and vestries were demolished and replaced with a new chancel with a south chancel aisle and new north vestries. The choir was moved from the nave to the chancel, and the organ was enlarged and relocated. In 1892 a new central east window by Clayton and Bell was installed, depicting the Ascension of Jesus, with inscriptions including "He was taken up and a cloud received him out of their sight" and "I ascend unto my Father and your Father", and symbols such as Alpha and Omega, a crown, an orb, and the IHC monogram. The same year saw the installation of the current font by T. H. Knight and Sons of Teignmouth, made of marble with alabaster panels and green Irish marble shafts, in the late Decorated Gothic style. Its octagonal bowl displays winged symbols of the four Evangelists from the Book of Revelation and Book of Ezekiel.

Around 1899 the altar was enlarged and restored, and a reredos by Jones and Willis was added, featuring a sculpture of The Last Supper flanked by panels showing Christ as the Bread of Life and as the True Vine, along with figures of the four Evangelists. The pulpit was restored in 1900, and an oak eagle lectern presented. A side chapel was furnished in 1901. In 1907 two large paintings of the stoning of Stephen and the conversion of St Paul were hung above the west gallery.

=== 20th and 21st centuries ===
A vicarage was built in 1913 on land donated by Mr Paulin. Electric lighting was installed in the chancel and chapel in 1922 and later in the nave.

For the church’s centenary in 1928, the chancel and side chapel were extended, with the chancel lengthened by about 10 feet. The apsidal end and roof were dismantled and re-erected. A new clergy vestry was added. Rowland Plumbe & Partners designed the work. The original twelve stained glass panels of St Paul were reassembled into two windows facing each other in the extended chancel. New clergy stalls of Japanese oak and choir stalls of Austrian oak were installed between 1928 and 1931, made by Geo. M. Hammer & Co. Ltd. under the direction of J. C. S. Mummery.

The heating system was converted to oil in 1960 and to gas in 1974, with the former boiler room adapted as the churchwardens’ vestry. In 1975 mosaics of the Virgin and Child and of St Paul holding a scroll and sword were added, funded by a legacy from J. Wilkes, a long-serving churchwarden, and designed by S. W. Pietzsch. In 1983 a credence table of oak was added in memory of the Revd Francis Lampen. The sanctuary contains an aumbry on the north wall for the reserved sacrament and a piscina on the south side, both with drains to return water to the ground.

== Associated buildings and community ==
=== St Paul's Church of England Primary School ===
The Winchmore Hill National School, later St Paul’s Church of England School, was built in 1859 on land given by John Donnithorne Taylor of Grovelands. It operated under the National Society for Promoting Religious Education. The original building, with a tower and clock, was replaced after being declared unsafe in 1958. The school moved to Ringwood Way in 1961, with the original foundation stone preserved in the church grounds. It remains a voluntary aided school with strong parish links.

=== Church hall ===
A parish hall has existed since 1903, originally the St Paul’s Institute on Station Road, given by Sir William Paulin and his daughters. The current hall, on the former day school site, was built in two phases from 1966, designed by K. C. White & Partners. Rooms are named after William Howley, Frederick Temple, and Sir William Paulin. St Paul’s Lodge for the assistant curate was built next to the hall in 1967.

=== Local history ===
Parish records document Winchmore Hill’s change from a rural village to a London suburb. Early registers list occupations such as farmer, blacksmith, corn merchant, wheelwright, ostler, and cordwainer. By the 1860s they included omnibus conductors and barristers, and by the late 19th century railway workers, lamplighters, and gas engineers. The population grew from about 1,300 in 1844 to 3,695 in 1901.

=== St Paul's Winchmore Hill Trust ===
Established in 1982 from a bequests from Arthur and Dorothy Cooper, which was subsequently amalgamated with an earlier bequest from 1875 made by Mr. P. H. Purvis, a former churchwarden, the Trust supports the advancement of the Christian religion through maintenance, development, and extension of the church’s work and buildings.

== Memorials ==
Although a covenant was placed stipulating that no burials should take place on the donated church land, a small garden of remembrance is present. The Garden of Rest, situated between the church and the church hall, was designated in 1961 for the interment of cremated remains. Additionally, the church houses a number of other internal memorials, though not all are detailed in the published guide.

== Leadership ==
Priests-in-charge

- 1828–1834: T. Bissland
- 1834–1844: E. B. Warren
- 1844–1851: J. D. Frost

Incumbent

- 1851–1868/9: J. D. Frost

Vicars

- 1868/9–1874: J. D. Frost
- 1874–1901: A. C. A. Drought
- 1901–1907: A. J. B. Dewdney
- 1908–1925: E. N. Coulthard
- 1925–1930: R. W. Odell
- 1931–1950: G. H. Lancaster
- 1950–1981: F. Lampen
- 1982–1998: D. J. Nash
- 1999–2009: J. M. Paul
- 2010–2017: W. J. Adam
- 2018–(present): D. P. Sandham

== Bibliography ==
- Kelly, Edward Stanley (1987). St Paul’s Church – Winchmore Hill. St Paul's Winchmore Hill Trust.
