= 2011 Newcastle-under-Lyme Borough Council election =

2011 UK local government election

The 2011 Newcastle-under-Lyme Borough Council election was held on Thursday 5 May 2011 to elect 21 members to Newcastle-under-Lyme Borough Council, the same day as other local elections in the United Kingdom. It elected one-third of the council's 60 members to a four-year term and one additional member in Kidsgrove Ward to a one-year term following the resignation of Tina Morrey. The election for Seabridge Ward was postponed until 23 June 2011 following the death of a candidate. It was preceded by the 2010 election and followed by the 2012 election. The council remained under no overall control. Turnout across the council was 36.3%.

== Results summary ==
2011 Newcastle-under-Lyme Borough Council election
Party	This election			Full council			This election		
Party	Seats	Net	Seats %	Other	Total	Total %	Votes	Votes %	+/−
Labour	15	▲11	71.4	10	25	41.7			
Conservative	4	▼4	19.0	17	21	35.0			
Liberal Democrats	2	▼5	9.5	10	12	20.0			
UKIP	0	▼2	0.0	2	2	3.3			
Independent	0	Steady	0.0	0	0	0.0			

== Ward results ==
=== Audley and Bignall End ===
Audley and Bignall End (1 seat)
Party	Candidate	Votes	%	±%
Labour	Ann Beech*	749	41.2	▲2.7
Liberal Democrats	Bert Proctor	671	36.9	▲4.0
Conservative	Luke Hilliard	229	12.6	▼2.8
UKIP	Roger Ruddle	168	9.2	▼3.9
Majority		78	4.3	▼1.4
Total valid votes		1,817	99.5	
Rejected ballots		10	0.5	
Turnout		1,827	38.8	
Registered electors		4,704		
Labour hold		Swing	▼0.7	

=== Bradwell ===
Bradwell (1 seat)
Party	Candidate	Votes	%	±%
Labour	Sandra Hambleton*	873	51.2	▲15.1
Conservative	Chloe Mancey	406	23.8	▼6.6
UKIP	Andrew Keeling	346	20.3	▲1.5
Liberal Democrats	Julian Colclough	79	4.6	▼10.0
Majority		467	27.4	▲21.7
Total valid votes		1,704	99.2	
Rejected ballots		13	0.8	
Turnout		1,717	38.1	
Registered electors		4,505		
Labour hold		Swing	▲10.8	

=== Butt Lane ===
Butt Lane (1 seat)
Party	Candidate	Votes	%	±%
Labour	John Taylor	584	43.0	▲15.7
Liberal Democrats	Silvia Burgess*	348	25.6	▼13.9
UKIP	John Holdcroft	271	20.0	▲3.7
Conservative	James Bowles	154	11.3	▲2.6
Majority		236	17.4	N/A
Total valid votes		1,357	99.3	
Rejected ballots		10	0.7	
Turnout		1,367	31.4	
Registered electors		4,355		
Labour gain from Liberal Democrats		Swing	▲14.8	

=== Chesterton ===
Chesterton (1 seat)
Party	Candidate	Votes	%	±%
Labour	Sandra Simpson*	778	50.2	▲10.8
Conservative	Matthew Davies	311	20.1	▲5.8
UKIP	Anthony Myers	295	19.0	▼5.2
Liberal Democrats	Mike Dolman	167	10.8	▼11.4
Majority		467	30.1	▲14.9
Total valid votes		1,551	100.0	
Rejected ballots		0	0.0	
Turnout		1,551	28.0	
Registered electors		5,542		
Labour hold		Swing	▲2.5	

=== Cross Heath ===
Cross Heath (1 seat)
Party	Candidate	Votes	%	±%
Labour	John Williams*	819	51.3	▲6.6
UKIP	Nathan Brittain	496	31.0	▲14.7
Conservative	Jonathan Lewis	180	11.3	▼3.9
Liberal Democrats	David Dugdale	103	6.4	▼17.3
Majority		323	20.2	▼0.8
Total valid votes		1,598	99.4	
Rejected ballots		9	0.6	
Turnout		1,607	36.6	
Registered electors		4,389		
Labour hold		Swing	▼4.1	

=== Halmer End ===
Halmer End (1 seat)
Party	Candidate	Votes	%	±%
Liberal Democrats	David Becket*	575	43.1	▼6.4
Labour	Paul Breuer	406	30.5	▲11.6
Conservative	Andrew Firth	252	18.9	▼0.3
UKIP	Mark Barlow	100	7.5	▼5.0
Majority		169	12.7	▼17.7
Total valid votes		1,333	99.3	
Rejected ballots		10	0.7	
Turnout		1,343	44.0	
Registered electors		3,049		
Liberal Democrats hold		Swing	▼9.0	

=== Keele ===
Keele (1 seat)
Party	Candidate	Votes	%	±%
Labour	Tony Kearon	410	52.8	▲36.9
Liberal Democrats	Wenslie Naylon*	224	28.9	▼4.0
Conservative	Kate Lawrence	112	14.4	▼4.0
UKIP	Trevor Colclough	30	3.9	▼0.2
Majority		186	24.0	N/A
Total valid votes		776	97.9	
Rejected ballots		17	2.1	
Turnout		793	23.6	
Registered electors		3,359		
Labour gain from Liberal Democrats		Swing		

=== Kidsgrove ===
Kidsgrove (2 seats)
Party	Candidate	Votes	%	±%
Labour	Margaret Astle	835		
Labour	Reginald Bailey	713		
UKIP	Tricia Harrison	418		
Liberal Democrats	Geoffrey Hall	315		
UKIP	Ian Shepherd	310		
Conservative	Simon Barnes	227		
Liberal Democrats	John Parsons	215		
Turnout		1,668	31.7	
Registered electors		5,270		
Labour gain from Liberal Democrats				
Labour gain from Liberal Democrats				

=== Knutton and Silverdale ===
Knutton and Silverdale (1 seat)
Party	Candidate	Votes	%	±%
Labour	Tony Eagles	435	44.6	▲11.6
UKIP	Derrick Huckfield*	405	41.5	▼5.8
Conservative	Andrew Nicholson	92	9.4	▼2.1
Liberal Democrats	Chris Wain	43	4.4	▼3.7
Majority		30	3.1	N/A
Total valid votes		975	99.9	
Rejected ballots		1	0.1	
Turnout		976	30.6	
Registered electors		3,190		
Labour gain from UKIP		Swing	▲8.7	

=== Loggerheads and Whitmore ===
Loggerheads and Whitmore (1 seat)
Party	Candidate	Votes	%	±%
Conservative	David Loades	1,669	65.8	▼2.3
Labour	Sophia Baker	372	14.7	New
UKIP	Carol Lovatt	286	11.3	▼7.6
Liberal Democrats	Morgan Inwood	210	8.3	▼4.8
Majority		1,297	51.1	▲2.0
Total valid votes		2,537	98.8	
Rejected ballots		31	1.2	
Turnout		2,568	45.4	
Registered electors		5,657		
Conservative hold		Swing	▼8.5	

=== Madeley ===
Madeley (1 seat)
Party	Candidate	Votes	%	±%
Labour	Bill Sinnott	483	34.3	▲5.2
Conservative	Tracey Peers	445	31.6	▼4.1
Liberal Democrats	Simon White	366	26.0	▼3.1
UKIP	Wayne Harling	113	8.0	▲2.1
Majority		38	2.7	N/A
Total valid votes		1,407	99.1	
Rejected ballots		13	0.9	
Turnout		1,420	41.2	
Registered electors		3,445		
Labour gain from Conservative		Swing	▲4.6	

=== May Bank ===
May Bank (1 seat)
Party	Candidate	Votes	%	±%
Conservative	Simon Tagg*	1,426	66.5	▲3.6
Labour	Stephen Harrison	519	24.2	▲8.3
UKIP	Dean Page	117	5.5	▼6.0
Liberal Democrats	Malcolm Henshall	83	3.9	▼5.9
Majority		907	42.3	▼4.7
Total valid votes		2,145	42.7	
Registered electors		5,027		
Conservative hold		Swing	▼2.4	

=== Newchapel ===
Newchapel (1 seat)
Party	Candidate	Votes	%	±%
Labour	Paul Waring	304	32.7	▲3.8
Conservative	Carl Thomson	254	27.3	▼7.9
Independent	Victor Jukes	168	18.1	New
UKIP	Michael Prosser	143	15.4	▲0.7
Liberal Democrats	Eric Durber	60	6.5	▼14.6
Majority		50	5.4	N/A
Total valid votes		929	97.4	
Rejected ballots		25	2.6	
Turnout		954	34.0	
Registered electors		2,805		
Labour gain from Conservative		Swing	▲5.8	

=== Ravenscliffe ===
Ravenscliffe (1 seat)
Party	Candidate	Votes	%	±%
Labour	Gill Burnett	439	39.9	▲16.6
Conservative	Elizabeth Bishop*	291	26.5	▼6.1
UKIP	Geoffrey Locke	247	22.5	▲0.9
Liberal Democrats	Doris Hall	123	11.2	▼11.4
Majority		148	13.5	N/A
Total valid votes		1,100	99.2	
Rejected ballots		9	0.8	
Turnout		1,109	32.9	
Registered electors		3,375		
Labour gain from Conservative		Swing	▲11.3	

=== Seabridge ===
Seabridge (Note: The election is Seabridge was postponed to 23 June 2011 after the death of a candidate.) (1 seat)
Party	Candidate	Votes	%	±%
Conservative	Peter Hailstones*	557	45.7	▼6.9
Labour	Colin Brookes	497	40.8	▲17.8
UKIP	George Harvey	112	9.2	▼1.9
Liberal Democrats	Hilary Jones	52	4.3	▼9.0
Majority		60	4.9	▼24.7
Total valid votes		1,218	26.0	
Registered electors		4,689		
Conservative hold		Swing	▼12.4	

=== Silverdale and Parksite ===
Silverdale and Parksite (1 seat)
Party	Candidate	Votes	%	±%
Labour	Thomas Lawton	471	46.4	▲18.3
UKIP	Eileen Braithwaite*	431	42.5	▼11.1
Conservative	Rita Gilmore	112	11.0	▲0.4
Majority		40	3.9	N/A
Total valid votes		1,014	98.8	
Rejected ballots		12	1.2	
Turnout		1,026	37.1	
Registered electors		2,769		
Labour gain from UKIP		Swing	▲14.7	

=== Talke ===
Talke (1 seat)
Party	Candidate	Votes	%	±%
Labour	David Allport	451	38.0	New
UKIP	Matthew Banner	305	25.8	▲7.3
Liberal Democrats	David Daniels*	301	25.4	▼19.2
Conservative	Andrew Davies	130	11.0	▼3.9
Majority		146	12.3	N/A
Total valid votes		1,187	98.9	
Rejected ballots		13	1.1	
Turnout		1,200	37.3	
Registered electors		3,219		
Labour gain from Liberal Democrats		Swing		

=== Thistleberry ===
Thistleberry (1 seat)
Party	Candidate	Votes	%	±%
Liberal Democrats	Nigel Jones*	750	37.6	▼16.4
Labour	James Matthews	563	28.2	▲14.1
Conservative	Adam Carney	519	26.0	▲6.0
UKIP	Dominic Arnold	164	8.2	▼3.7
Majority		187	9.4	▼24.7
Total valid votes		1,996	98.9	
Rejected ballots		23	1.1	
Turnout		2,019	43.5	
Registered electors		4,640		
Liberal Democrats hold		Swing	▼15.3	

=== Westlands ===
Westlands (1 seat)
Party	Candidate	Votes	%	±%
Conservative	Mark Holland	1,086	47.9	▼11.8
Labour	David Leech	792	34.9	▲21.0
UKIP	Philip O'Rourke	226	10.0	▼1.6
Liberal Democrats	Michael Shenton	165	7.3	▼7.6
Majority		294	13.0	▼31.8
Total valid votes		2,269	49.1	
Registered electors		4,622		
Conservative hold		Swing	▼16.4	

=== Wolstanton ===
Wolstanton (1 seat)
Party	Candidate	Votes	%	±%
Labour	Sophie Olszewski	596	37.7	▲7.9
UKIP	David Woolley	405	25.6	▲8.4
Conservative	John Pedder	343	21.7	▼14.8
Liberal Democrats	Mark Hammersley	236	14.9	▲5.7
Majority		191	12.1	N/A
Total valid votes		1,580	99.4	
Rejected ballots		9	0.6	
Turnout		1,589	35.3	
Registered electors		4,497		
Labour gain from Conservative		Swing		
