= 2010 Newcastle-under-Lyme Borough Council election =

2010 English local government election

Map of the 2010 Newcastle-under-Lyme Borough Council election

The 2010 Newcastle-under-Lyme Borough Council election took place on 6 May 2010 to elect a third of the members of Newcastle-under-Lyme Borough Council, the council of Newcastle-under-Lyme in England. This was on the same day as the other local elections as well as the 2010 United Kingdom general election. The previous council election took place in 2008 and the following election was held in 2011. In the election, the Liberal Democrats lost two wards to Labour but gained one from the Conservatives, the council stayed under no overall control.

== Results ==
| Party | Previous | Seats +/- | 2010 |
|---|---|---|---|
| Conservative | 24 | ▼1 | 23 |
| Liberal Democrat | 19 | ▼1 | 18 |
| Labour | 12 | ▲2 | 14 |
| UKIP | 5 | Steady | 5 |

== See also ==
- Newcastle-under-Lyme Borough Council elections
