= Harriet Slater (politician) =

British politician (1903–1976)

Harriet Slater CBE

Member of Parliament for Stoke-on-Trent North
- In office 31 March 1953 – 30 March 1966
- Prime Minister: Winston Churchill
- Preceded by: Albert Davies
- Succeeded by: John Forrester

Personal details
- Born: Harriet Evans; 1903
- Died: 12 October 1976 (aged 72–73)
- Party: Labour

Harriet Slater CBE (née Evans; 3 July 1903 – 12 October 1976) was a British Labour and Co-operative politician.

== Life and career ==
Slater, née Evans, was born in Tunstall, Staffordshire, on 3 July 1903. Educated at Hanley High School and Dudley Teachers' Training College, she was National Organiser for the Co-operative Party from 1942 to 1953, and a local councillor in Stoke-on-Trent from 1933 to 1965.

Slater was elected as the Member of Parliament (MP) for Stoke-on-Trent North at a by-election in 1953, and served until her retirement at the 1966 general election. From 1964 to 1966, she was a Government whip, the first woman to become one, with the formal title of Lord of the Treasury.

Ruth Smeeth writes that Slater saw her role in Parliament as "being a practical advocate for the working-class, especially working-class women ... As her parliamentary colleague Laurie Pavitt MP once wrote of her, Harriet was Stoke-on-Trent. She knew what mattered to the people she represented, because she was one of them." Slater's maiden speech was about racial justice, made spontaneously because of her strong feelings about equality.

She was married to Frederick Slater, whom she met through the Co-operative movement.

Slater was granted a life peerage on her retirement from Parliament.

Parliament of the United Kingdom
Preceded by Albert Davies	Member of Parliament for Stoke-on-Trent North; 1953–1966	Succeeded by John Forrester
