= John Forrester (politician) =

British politician (1924–2007)

- Born: 17 June 1924; Hanley, Stoke-on-Trent
- Died: 24 November 2007 (aged 83); Stoke-on-Trent
- Education: Stoke-on-Trent City School of Commerce, Alsager Teacher Training College
- Occupation(s): Teacher, Member of Parliament, City councillor

John Stuart Forrester (17 June 1924 – 24 November 2007) was a British Labour Party politician.

== Early life and education ==
Forrester was born in Hanley, Stoke-on-Trent, and was educated at Eastwood School and the City School of Commerce in Stoke-on-Trent, and Alsager teacher training college in Cheshire.

== Early career ==
He spent three and a half years in the Royal Navy and taught English to the Polish Resettlement Corps before becoming a teacher in the city. Partly as a consequence of his experience in the armed services, Forrester remained a "steadfast Atlanticist all his political life".

== Political career ==
Having been secretary of the local Constituency Labour Party from 1961, Forrester was Member of Parliament for Stoke-on-Trent North from 1966 to 1987, when was deselected as Labour candidate and replaced by Joan Walley.

In 1970, he was appointed as parliamentary private secretary to David Ennals, the then Minister of State at the Department of Health and Social Security.

Forrester was a Stoke-on-Trent City councillor for East Valley, a ward that includes parts of Smallthorne, Sneyd Green, Milton and Baddeley Green, from 1973 to 2000 and served as chairman of the authority's licensing committee.

He was made Stoke-on-Trent's 50th honorary Freeman in 1992. He also served as a Magistrate in the city.

After Forrester's death, the Secretary of his local Labour Party Branch spoke of his "sense of duty, his commitment, his approachability, his warmth, and his humour".

Parliament of the United Kingdom
Preceded by Harriet Slater	Member of Parliament for Stoke-on-Trent North; 1966–1987	Succeeded by Joan Walley
