= Albert Davies (politician) =

British politician (1900–1953)

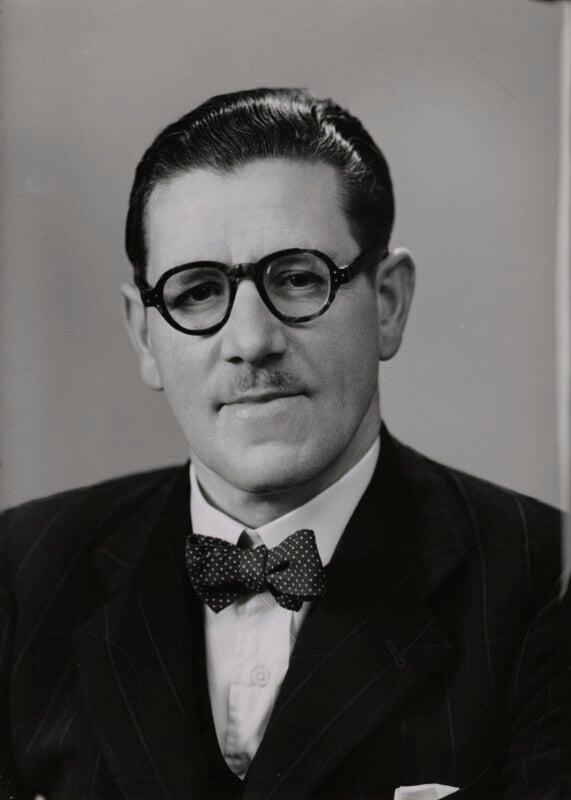
Davies in 1949

Albert Edward Davies (30 May 1900 – 19 January 1953) was a Labour Party politician in the United Kingdom.

Born 30 May 1900 in the Smallthorne area of Stoke-on-Trent and he started work aged 14 on the railway. He continued as a clerk at the railway until he was elected at the 1945 general election as Member of Parliament (MP) for the Burslem division of Stoke-on-Trent.

The Burslem seat was abolished for the 1950 general election, when Davies was re-elected for the new Stoke-on-Trent North constituency, and held that seat until his death in 1953.

Davies was on his way to Jamaica as member of a delegation from the Commonwealth Parliamentary Association on board the SS Bayano when he died, aged 52, and was buried at sea.

Parliament of the United Kingdom
Preceded by Andrew MacLaren	Member of Parliament for Burslem; 1945–1950	Constituency abolished
New constituency	Member of Parliament for Stoke-on-Trent North; 1950–1953	Succeeded by Harriet Slater
