= Ruth Anderson, Baroness Anderson of Stoke-on-Trent =

British Labour politician

The Right Honourable The Baroness Anderson of Stoke-on-Trent
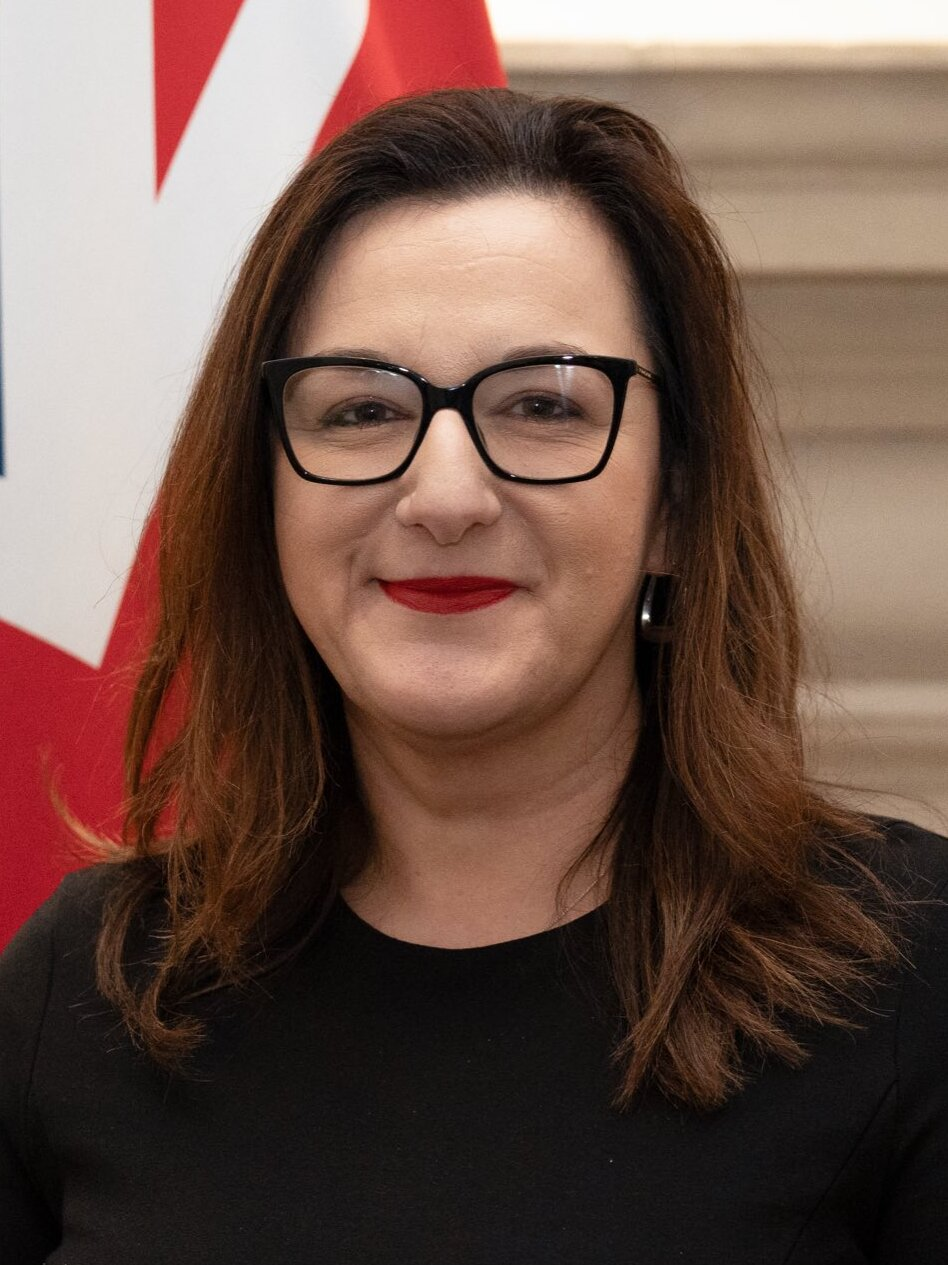
- Official portrait, 2026

Government Deputy Chief Whip in the House of Lords Captain of the Yeomen of the Guard
- Incumbent
- Assumed office 22 July 2026
- Prime Minister: Andy Burnham
- Preceded by: The Baroness Wheeler

Parliamentary Under-Secretary of State for Northern Ireland
- Incumbent
- Assumed office 22 July 2026
- Prime Minister: Andy Burnham
- Preceded by: Matthew Patrick

Parliamentary Secretary for the Cabinet Office
- In office 3 March 2026 – 22 July 2026 Serving with Satvir Kaur, Chris Ward, James Frith
- Prime Minister: Keir Starmer
- Preceded by: Josh Simons

Member of the House of Lords
- Lord Temporal
- Life peerage 18 November 2022

Member of Parliament for Stoke-on-Trent North
- In office 7 May 2015 – 6 November 2019
- Preceded by: Joan Walley
- Succeeded by: Jonathan Gullis

Personal details
- Born: Ruth Lauren Anderson; 29 June 1979 (age 47) Edinburgh, Scotland
- Party: Labour
- Spouse(s): Michael Smeeth (m. 2004–2018) Gareth Snell (m. 2025)
- Education: University of Birmingham

Ruth Lauren Anderson, Baroness Anderson of Stoke-on-Trent (formerly Smeeth; born 29 June 1979) is a British Labour Party politician who was the Member of Parliament (MP) for Stoke-on-Trent North from 2015 until 2019. Since 2022 she has been a member of the House of Lords.

After working in public relations roles for the Britain Israel Communications and Research Centre and Nestlé, Anderson became more actively involved in the Labour Party. She stood as an MP candidate in the 2010 election but was not elected. She was named as an intelligence source to "strictly protect" by the US embassy in London in a 2009 diplomatic cable published online in 2011. During her parliamentary career she campaigned for the UK to remain in the European Union. She served as parliamentary private secretary to Tom Watson, Deputy Leader of the Labour Party, but resigned so she could vote against a second Brexit referendum. She was elected Parliamentary Chair of the Jewish Labour Movement in April 2019 and served until she lost the contest for the Stoke constituency in December of that year.

== Early life ==
Ruth Anderson was born in Edinburgh, Scotland. Her mother is from east London, and her father is a Scottish trade unionist. Her maternal family is Jewish, and arrived in London during the 1890s, having escaped Russian pogroms. She had no contact with her father after her parents divorced when she was aged three.

Anderson attended school and taught at a Jewish school in Bristol, where her mother was later deputy general secretary for Amicus, and in her early life travelled extensively across the UK due to her mother's work.

Anderson graduated with a degree in Politics and International Relations from the University of Birmingham in 2000. She worked as a policy and research officer for a trade union before working in a public relations role from January 2004 to September 2005 at Sodexo. After marrying Michael Smeeth, she became director of public affairs and campaigns at the Britain Israel Communications and Research Centre (BICOM) in November 2005, leaving in early 2007 to work in PR for Nestlé.

From 2010 to 2015, she was a deputy director of anti-racism and -fascism advocacy group Hope Not Hate. She has also been employed by the Community Security Trust and has worked for the Board of Deputies of British Jews.

== Parliamentary career ==
Anderson was selected as Labour Party candidate for the Burton constituency in the 2010 general election, finishing 6,304 votes behind Andrew Griffiths of the Conservative Party. She was subsequently selected from an all-women shortlist to be Labour Party candidate for Stoke-on-Trent North, following the retirement of incumbent Labour MP Joan Walley, and was subsequently elected at the 2015 general election.

When she was the Labour Prospective Parliamentary Candidate for Burton, Smeeth was named in a 2009 cable from the US embassy in London as a source to "strictly protect". According to the cable Smeeth had supplied intelligence about Prime Minister Gordon Brown's intention to call an election in late 2009, and his subsequent decision against doing so at that time.

Anderson backed Yvette Cooper in the 2015 Labour leadership election.

In October 2015, Anderson was given an adjournment debate on holiday hunger.

In June 2016, Anderson resigned her post as parliamentary private secretary (PPS) to the shadow Northern Ireland and Scotland teams, alongside others, in protest at Jeremy Corbyn's leadership. She supported Owen Smith in the failed attempt to replace him in the 2016 Labour leadership election.

Anderson campaigned for the UK to remain in the European Union in the approach to the 2016 referendum. Her constituency voted for Brexit by 72.1%. In November 2016, Smeeth said "I'll be voting for us to move to Article 50. The general public, especially in Stoke-on-Trent, sent a very clear message with some parts of my constituency voting 80/20 to leave. My whole priority and focus is how we can make it work".

In June 2016, at the launch of the Chakrabarti Report, Marc Wadsworth, a Labour Party activist, described Smeeth as working "hand-in-hand" with Kate McCann of The Daily Telegraph, after McCann passed Smeeth his press release. Anderson later issued a statement that Wadsworth was using "traditional antisemitic slurs to attack me for being part of a 'media conspiracy'" and criticised a lack of response from Corbyn or his office, calling on him to resign.

However, according to a video recording of the event, Wadsworth did not mention a general "media conspiracy", or refer to Jews. Wadsworth said he was unaware Anderson was Jewish, and that "I've never been called anti-semitic in my life. ... The Jewish people have an ally in me."

Anderson said that she received 25,000 pieces of abuse during July and August, including 20,000 in the 12-hour period immediately following the incident. However, the Jewish Voice for Labour group contested this, by comparing Anderson's claim with a study by the Community Service Trust, who monitor anti-Semitic and abusive media content. The study found that over an entire year (encompassing the 12-hour period of Anderson's claim of 20,000 cases) only 9,008 original tweets concerning Jews were classified as antagonistic. Other studies investigating the most abused MPs on Twitter found that Anderson was not mentioned, since she did not exceed the threshold of abuse to be ranked. In July 2020, Wadsworth referred to Anderson as a "pro-Israeli government zealot".

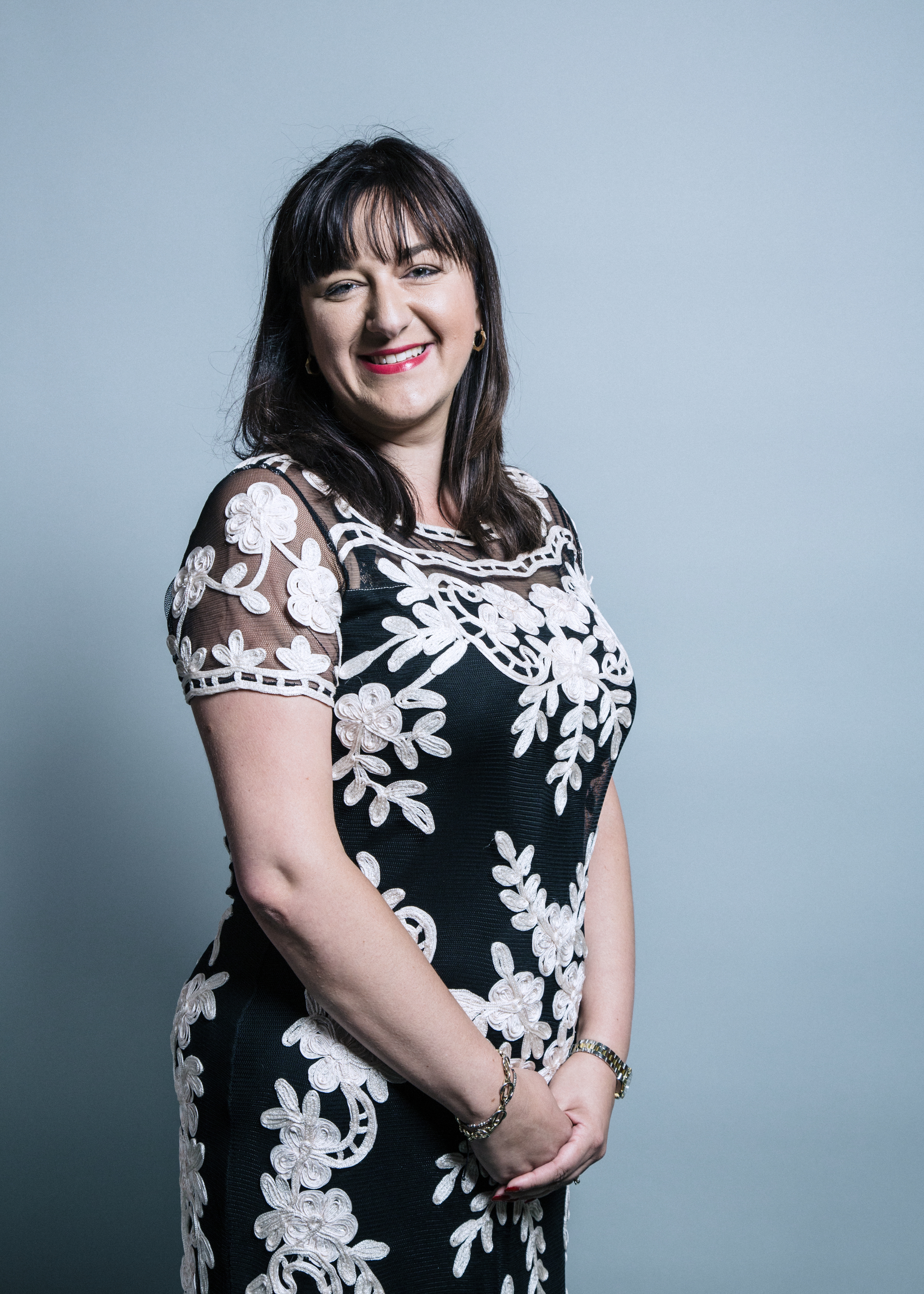
Official portrait, 2017

Anderson lodged an official complaint against MP Chris Williamson for saying the Labour Party was being “demonised as a racist party” and had “given too much ground” to people making allegations of anti-Semitism. During a talk as part of the pressure campaign against Williamson, Anderson stated: "the only people weaponising anti-Semitism are the anti-Semites".

The police strengthened her security after she received a death threat. In April 2018, Anderson was accompanied by around 40 Labour MPs and peers to a Labour hearing into Wadsworth's conduct. Wadsworth was expelled for bringing the Party into disrepute.

Anderson retained her seat in the 2017 general election with a much reduced majority.

In March 2019, Anderson resigned as PPS to Tom Watson, Deputy Leader of the Labour Party to vote against a second referendum on Brexit, as Labour had instructed its MPs to abstain.

In April 2019, Anderson was elected Parliamentary Chair of the Jewish Labour Movement. She is a member of Labour Friends of Israel.

In the December 2019 general election, Anderson lost her seat to Conservative Jonathan Gullis, who overturned her 2,359, or five per cent, majority to a 15% or 6,286 majority of his own.

Anderson endorsed Ian Murray in the 2020 Labour Party deputy leadership election.

It was announced on 14 October 2022 that, as part of the 2022 Special Honours, Anderson would receive a life peerage. On 18 November 2022, she was created Baroness Anderson of Stoke-on-Trent, of Stoke-on-Trent in the County of Staffordshire. She was appointed as Parliamentary Secretary for the Cabinet Office on 3 March 2026.

== Personal life ==
Anderson describes herself as "culturally Jewish". She was previously married to Michael Smeeth, a business executive and the UK chair of the British-American Project. In May 2025, she married Gareth Snell, Member of Parliament (MP) for Stoke-on-Trent Central, in a ceremony in Gibraltar.

In June 2020, Anderson became chief executive of Index on Censorship, an organisation that campaigns for freedom of speech. After taking on her role in the House of Lords, she has advocated for Parliamentary bills that Amnesty International says "stifle free speech" and that organisations including Greenpeace and the European Legal Support Centre say "will stifle a wide range of campaigns concerned with the arms trade, climate justice, human rights, international law, and international solidarity with oppressed peoples struggling for justice".

Anderson was appointed an Honorary Captain in the Royal Naval Reserve in July 2021.

Parliament of the United Kingdom
Preceded by Joan Walley	Member of Parliament for Stoke-on-Trent North; 2015–2019	Succeeded by Jonathan Gullis
