= 1953 Stoke-on-Trent North by-election =

UK parliamentary by-election

The 1953 Stoke-on-Trent North by-election was held on 31 March 1953 after the incumbent Labour MP, Albert Davies, died on his way to Jamaica as member of a delegation from the Commonwealth Parliamentary Association. It was retained by the Labour candidate Harriet Slater, who had been a local councillor from 1933.

By Election 1953: Stoke-on-Trent North
Party	Candidate	Votes	%	±%
Labour Co-op	Harriet Slater	23,103	75.49	+4.05
Conservative	SF Middup	7,502	24.51	−4.05
Majority		15,601	50.98	+8.10
Turnout		30,605		
Labour hold		Swing		
