= Stoke-on-Trent North =

Parliamentary constituency in the United Kingdom, 1950 onwards

Coordinates: 53.07°N 2.20°W

- Borough constituency for the House of Commons
- Boundaries since 2024
- Boundary of Stoke-on-Trent North in West Midlands region
- County: Staffordshire
- Electorate: 72,225 (December 2010)
- Major settlements: Burslem, Tunstall

Current constituency
- Created: 1950
- Member of Parliament: David Williams (Labour)
- Seats: One
- Created from: Burslem, Hanley; Leek

Stoke-on-Trent North is a constituency (Note: A borough constituency (for the purposes of election expenses and type of returning officer)) represented in the House of Commons of the UK Parliament by David Williams, a member of the Labour Party. (Note: As with all constituencies, the constituency elects one Member of Parliament (MP) by the first past the post system of election at least every five years.)

== Constituency profile ==
Nash Peake Street, Tunstall

Stoke-on-Trent North is a constituency in Staffordshire in the West Midlands region of England. It covers the northern areas of the city of Stoke-on-Trent, including the towns of Burslem and Tunstall and the residential districts of Norton le Moors and Baddeley Green. It also covers the town of Kidsgrove, which lies outside the city's boundaries.

Stoke-on-Trent is a polycentric city that was formed in 1910 from the amalgamation of six towns. The Stoke-on-Trent area is commonly referred to as the Potteries, reflecting its traditional status as the country's foremost centre for the production of ceramics. Coal mining and steelmaking were also important industries in the city. The deindustrialisation of the late 20th century had a negative economic impact on the city; Burslem and Tunstall remain highly-deprived today and many residents live in dense, socially-rented terraces. Kidsgrove and Baddeley Green are comparatively wealthier. House prices across the constituency are generally lower than the rest of the West Midlands and the average price is less than half the UK average.

Residents of Stoke-on-Trent North have a similar age profile to the rest of the country. They have low rates of income, average levels of homeownership, and the child poverty rate is nearly double the overall UK figure. Residents have very low levels of education and a high proportion work in the manufacturing and retail sectors. The percentage claiming unemployment benefits is high. White people made up 87% of the population at the 2021 census. Asians, mostly of Pakistani origin, were 8% of residents, but they made up around a quarter of the population in Burslem and Tunstall.

Most of this constituency is represented by the Labour Party at the local city council, with some Conservatives elected in the outer suburban areas. Kidsgrove, which held council elections more recently (in 2026), is represented by Reform UK councillors. Voters in Stoke-on-Trent North overwhelmingly supported leaving the European Union in the 2016 referendum; an estimated 72% voted in favour of Brexit compared to the UK-wide figure of 52%, the sixth-highest rate out of 650 constituencies nationwide according to Electoral Calculus.

== Boundaries ==
=== Historic ===
1950–1955: The County Borough of Stoke-on-Trent wards numbers 1 to 9 and 27.

1955–1983: The County Borough of Stoke-on-Trent wards numbers 1 to 8.

1983–1997: The City of Stoke-on-Trent wards of Burslem Central, Burslem Green, Chell, East Valley, Norton and Bradeley, and Tunstall North, and the Borough of Newcastle-under-Lyme wards of Butt Lane, Kidsgrove, Newchapel, and Talke.

1997–2010: The City of Stoke-on-Trent wards of Burslem Central, Burslem Grange, Chell, East Valley, Norton and Bradeley, and Tunstall North, and the District of Staffordshire Moorlands wards of Brown Edge and Endon, and Stanley.

2010–2024: The City of Stoke-on-Trent wards of Burslem North, Burslem South, Chell and Packmoor, East Valley, Norton and Bradeley, and Tunstall, and the Borough of Newcastle-under-Lyme wards of Butt Lane, Kidsgrove, Ravenscliffe, and Talke.

=== Current ===
Under the 2023 Periodic Review of Westminster constituencies which came into effect for the 2024 general election, the constituency was defined as composing the following as they existed on 1 December 2020:

- The Borough of Newcastle-under-Lyme wards of: Kidsgrove & Ravenscliffe; Newchapel & Mow Cop; Talke & Butt Lane.
- The City of Stoke-on-Trent wards of: Baddeley, Milton and Norton; Bradeley and Chell Heath; Burslem Central; Burslem Park; Ford Green and Smallthorne; Goldenhill and Sandyford; Great Chell and Packmoor; Little Chell and Stanfield; Moorcroft; Tunstall.

In order to bring the electorate within the permitted range, the Kidsgrove district of Newchapel was transferred from Staffordshire Moorlands. The boundary with Stoke-on-Trent Central was re-aligned to take account of revised ward boundaries.

Following a further local government boundary review in the City of Stoke-on-Trent which came into effect in May 2023, the constituency now comprises the following from the 2024 general election:

- The Borough of Newcastle-under-Lyme wards of: Kidsgrove & Ravenscliffe; Newchapel & Mow Cop; Talke & Butt Lane.
- The City of Stoke-on-Trent wards of: Baddeley, Milton & Norton; Bradeley and Chell Heath; Burslem; Burslem Park; Ford Green & Smallthorne; Goldenhill & Sandyford; Great Chell & Packmoor; Little Chell & Stanfield; Moorcroft & Sneyd Green (majority); Tunstall; and a very small part of Etruria & Hanley.

== History ==
The constituency was created for the 1950 general election as the successor to the Burslem Division of Stoke-on-Trent. It also included parts of the Leek constituency which had been absorbed into the County Borough of Stoke-on-Trent.

Political history

This seat and its predecessor had elected Labour MPs at every election since 1935, until Jonathan Gullis won the seat for the Conservatives from incumbent Ruth Smeeth in 2019. Labour's David Williams recaptured the seat from Gullis at the 2024 general election.

Prominent members

As a frontbench member in government, John Forrester became in 1970 a Health Minister, before the election of that year.

== Members of Parliament ==
Election	Member	Party
1950	Albert Davies	Labour
1953 by-election	Harriet Slater	Labour Co-op
1966	John Forrester	Labour
1987	Joan Walley	Labour
2015	Ruth Smeeth	Labour
2019	Jonathan Gullis	Conservative
2024	David Williams	Labour

== Elections ==
=== Elections in the 2020s ===
General election 2024: Stoke-on-Trent North
Party	Candidate	Votes	%	±%
Labour	David Williams	14,579	40.3	+5.5
Conservative	Jonathan Gullis	9,497	26.3	−27.8
Reform	Karl Beresford	8,824	24.4	+18.8
Green	Josh Harris	1,236	3.4	+2.0
Independent	Jag Boyapti	1,103	3.1	N/A
Liberal Democrats	Lucy Hurds	911	2.5	−0.8
Majority		5,082	14.1	N/A
Turnout		36,150	51.8	−8.1
Labour gain from Conservative		Swing	+16.6	

=== Elections in the 2010s ===
General election 2019: Stoke-on-Trent North
Party	Candidate	Votes	%	±%
Conservative	Jonathan Gullis	20,974	52.3	▲7.0
Labour	Ruth Smeeth	14,688	36.6	▼14.3
Brexit Party	Richard Watkin	2,374	5.9	New
Liberal Democrats	Peter Andras	1,268	3.2	▲1.0
Green	Alan Borgars	508	1.3	▼0.3
Independent	Matthew Dilworth	322	0.8	New
Majority		6,286	15.7	N/A
Turnout		40,134	57.5	▼1.1
Conservative gain from Labour		Swing	▲10.7	

General election 2017: Stoke-on-Trent North
Party	Candidate	Votes	%	±%
Labour	Ruth Smeeth	21,272	50.9	▲11.0
Conservative	Benedict Adams	18,913	45.3	▲17.9
Liberal Democrats	Richard Whelan	916	2.2	▼0.7
Green	Doug Rouxel	685	1.6	▼1.2
Majority		2,359	5.6	▼6.9
Turnout		41,786	58.6	▲5.4
Labour hold		Swing	▼3.4	

General election 2015: Stoke-on-Trent North
Party	Candidate	Votes	%	±%
Labour	Ruth Smeeth	15,429	39.9	▼4.4
Conservative	Benedict Adams	10,593	27.4	▲3.6
UKIP	Geoff Locke	9,542	24.7	▲18.5
Liberal Democrats	Paul Roberts	1,137	2.9	▼14.8
Green	Sean Adam	1,091	2.8	New
Independent	John Millward	508	1.3	New
Independent	Craig Pond	354	0.9	New
Majority		4,836	12.5	▼8.0
Turnout		38,654	53.2	▼2.6
Labour hold		Swing	▼4.0	

General election 2010: Stoke-on-Trent North
Party	Candidate	Votes	%	±%
Labour	Joan Walley	17,815	44.3	▼11.5
Conservative	Andy Large	9,580	23.8	▲6.0
Liberal Democrats	John Fisher	7,120	17.7	▲4.2
BNP	Melanie Baddeley	3,196	8.0	▲2.0
UKIP	Geoff Locke	2,485	6.2	▲2.1
Majority		8,235	20.5	▼11.9
Turnout		40,196	55.8	▲4.9
Labour hold		Swing	▼8.8	

=== Elections of the 2000s ===
General election 2005: Stoke-on-Trent North
Party	Candidate	Votes	%	±%
Labour	Joan Walley	16,191	52.6	−5.4
Conservative	Benjamin Browning	6,155	20.0	+1.2
Liberal Democrats	Henry Jebb	4,561	14.8	+2.9
BNP	Spencer Cartlidge	2,132	6.9	New
UKIP	Eileen Braithwaite	696	2.3	New
Veritas	Ian Taylor	689	2.2	New
Independent	Harry Chesters	336	1.1	New
Majority		10,036	32.6	−6.6
Turnout		30,760	52.7	+0.8
Labour hold		Swing	-3.3	

General election 2001: Stoke-on-Trent North
Party	Candidate	Votes	%	±%
Labour	Joan Walley	17,460	58.0	−7.2
Conservative	Benjamin Browning	5,676	18.8	−1.4
Liberal Democrats	Henry Jebb	3,580	11.9	+1.2
Independent	Charles Wanger	3,399	11.3	New
Majority		11,784	39.2	−5.8
Turnout		30,115	51.9	−13.4
Labour hold		Swing	-2.9	

=== Elections of the 1990s ===
General election 1997: Stoke-on-Trent North
Party	Candidate	Votes	%	±%
Labour	Joan Walley	25,190	65.2	+8.5
Conservative	Christopher Day	7,798	20.2	−9.0
Liberal Democrats	Henry Jebb	4,141	10.7	−2.6
Referendum	Jennefer Tobin	1,537	4.0	New
Majority		17,392	45.0	+17.5
Turnout		38,664	65.3	−8.1
Labour hold		Swing	+11.9	

General election 1992: Stoke-on-Trent North
Party	Candidate	Votes	%	±%
Labour	Joan Walley	30,464	56.7	+9.6
Conservative	Laurence Harris	15,687	29.2	−2.1
Liberal Democrats	John Redfern	7,167	13.3	−8.3
Natural Law	Alan Morrison	387	0.7	New
Majority		14,777	27.5	+11.7
Turnout		53,705	73.4	+0.5
Labour hold		Swing	+5.9	

=== Elections of the 1980s ===
General election 1987: Stoke-on-Trent North
Party	Candidate	Votes	%	±%
Labour	Joan Walley	25,459	47.1	+0.8
Conservative	Reginald Davies	16,946	31.3	+0.4
SDP	Stephen Simmonds	11,665	21.6	−1.2
Majority		8,513	15.8	+0.4
Turnout		54, 070	72.9	+1.9
Labour hold		Swing	+0.2	

General election 1983: Stoke-on-Trent North
Party	Candidate	Votes	%	±%
Labour	John Forrester	24,721	46.3	−13.1
Conservative	Roger Ibbs	16,518	30.9	+0.3
SDP	Trevor Beswick	12,186	22.8	+13.6
Majority		8,203	15.4	−13.3
Turnout		53,425	71.0	−1.7
Labour hold		Swing		

=== Elections of the 1970s ===
General election 1979: Stoke-on-Trent North
Party	Candidate	Votes	%	±%
Labour	John Forrester	25,652	59.36	
Conservative	Roger Ibbs	13,228	30.61	
Liberal	Clive Smedley	3,994	9.24	
National Front	C Baugh	341	0.79	New
Majority		12,424	28.75	
Turnout		43,215	72.75	
Labour hold		Swing		

General election October 1974: Stoke-on-Trent North
Party	Candidate	Votes	%	±%
Labour	John Forrester	25,264	60.59	
Conservative	JWD Davies	10,192	24.44	
Liberal	M Smith	6,239	14.96	New
Majority		15,072	36.15	
Turnout		41,695	69.61	
Labour hold		Swing		

General election February 1974: Stoke-on-Trent North
Party	Candidate	Votes	%	±%
Labour	John Forrester	28,177	64.19	
Conservative	J Davies	15,718	35.81	
Majority		12,459	28.38	
Turnout		43,895	73.95	
Labour hold		Swing		

General election 1970: Stoke-on-Trent North
Party	Candidate	Votes	%	±%
Labour	John Forrester	20,642	66.19	
Conservative	JS Heath	10,542	33.81	
Majority		10,100	32.38	
Turnout		31,184	52.95	
Labour win (new seat)				

=== Elections of the 1960s ===
General election 1966: Stoke-on-Trent North
Party	Candidate	Votes	%	±%
Labour	John Forrester	28,491	71.54	
Conservative	LCN Bury	11,335	28.46	
Majority		17,156	43.08	
Turnout		39,826	72.44	
Labour hold		Swing		

General election 1964: Stoke-on-Trent North
Party	Candidate	Votes	%	±%
Labour Co-op	Harriet Slater	27,584	64.74	
Conservative	B David Barton	15,025	35.26	
Majority		12,559	29.48	
Turnout		42,609	76.24	
Labour Co-op hold		Swing		

=== Elections of the 1950s ===
General election 1959: Stoke-on-Trent North
Party	Candidate	Votes	%	±%
Labour Co-op	Harriet Slater	29,336	63.97	
Conservative	Samuel Middup	16,522	36.03	
Majority		12,814	27.94	
Turnout		45,858	78.61	
Labour Co-op hold		Swing		

General election 1955: Stoke-on-Trent North
Party	Candidate	Votes	%	±%
Labour Co-op	Harriet Slater	29,473	66.87	
Conservative	Samuel Middup	14,599	33.13	
Majority		14,874	33.74	
Turnout		44,072	75.31	
Labour Co-op hold		Swing		

By-Election 1953: Stoke-on-Trent North
Party	Candidate	Votes	%	±%
Labour Co-op	Harriet Slater	23,103	75.49	+4.05
Conservative	Samuel Middup	7,502	24.51	−4.05
Majority		15,601	50.98	+8.10
Turnout		30,605		
Labour hold		Swing		

General election 1951: Stoke-on-Trent North
Party	Candidate	Votes	%	±%
Labour	Albert Davies	36,692	71.44	
National Liberal	James Coventry	14,668	28.56	
Majority		22,024	42.88	
Turnout		51,360	83.81	
Labour hold		Swing		

General election 1950: Stoke-on-Trent North
Party	Candidate	Votes	%	±%
Labour	Albert Davies	36,896	71.58	
Conservative	PW Hodgens	14,647	28.42	
Majority		22,249	43.16	
Turnout		51,543	85.01	
Labour win (new seat)				

== See also ==
- List of parliamentary constituencies in Staffordshire
- List of parliamentary constituencies in West Midlands (region)
- Edward Kenealy
