= 2022 Newcastle-under-Lyme Borough Council election =

2022 UK local government election

- 6 May 2022

All 44 seats to Newcastle-under-Lyme Borough Council 23 seats needed for a majority

| | First party | Second party |
|---|---|---|
| Leader | Simon Tagg | Mike Stubbs |
| Party | Conservative | Labour |
| Last election | 18 seats, 42.7% | 20 seats, 39.7% |
| Seats before | 23 | 18 |
| Seats won | 25 | 19 |
| Seat change | ▲7 | ▼1 |
| Popular vote | 30,830 | 29,108 |
| Percentage | 49.5% | 46.8% |
| Swing | ▲6.8% | ▲7.1% |
| | Third party | Fourth party |
| Leader | Marion Reddish |
| Party | Liberal Democrats | Independent |
| Last election | 3 seats, 5.5% | 3 seats, 9.1% |
| Seats before | 2 | 1 |
| Seats won | 0 | 0 |
| Seat change | ▼3 | ▼3 |
| Popular vote | 1,694 | 326 |
| Percentage | 2.7% | 0.5% |
| Swing | ▼2.8% | ▼8.6% |
- Results by ward
Leader before election
Simon Tagg
Conservative
Leader after election
Simon Tagg
Conservative

The 2022 Newcastle-under-Lyme Borough Council election took place on 5 May 2022 to elect members of Newcastle-under-Lyme Borough Council in England. It was held on the same day as other local elections.

Elections in 2018 left the council in no overall control, but the Conservatives were defending a majority on the council after taking control through defections in 2021.

The election saw the Conservatives retain their majority.

== Summary ==
=== Election result ===
2022 Newcastle-under-Lyme Borough Council election
| Party | Candidates | Seats | Gains | Losses | Net gain/loss | Seats % | Votes % | Votes | +/− |
|---|---|---|---|---|---|---|---|---|---|
| Conservative | 44 | 25 | 9 | 2 | ▲7 | 56.8 | 49.5 | 30,830 | +6.8 |
| Labour | 44 | 19 | 2 | 3 | ▼1 | 43.2 | 46.8 | 29,108 | +7.1 |
| Liberal Democrats | 6 | 0 | 0 | 3 | ▼3 | 0.0 | 2.7 | 1,694 | –2.8 |
| Independent | 2 | 0 | 0 | 3 | ▼3 | 0.0 | 0.5 | 326 | –8.6 |
| Green | 1 | 0 | 0 | 0 | Steady | 0.0 | 0.3 | 190 | –1.1 |
| TUSC | 1 | 0 | 0 | 0 | Steady | 0.0 | 0.2 | 104 | N/A |

== Results by ward ==
=== Audley ===
Audley (3)
| Party | Candidate | Votes | % | ±% |
|---|---|---|---|---|
| Labour | Sue Moffat* | 1,120 | 52.8 | +16.3 |
| Conservative | Ian Wilkes* | 883 | 41.6 | +7.1 |
| Conservative | Nick Crisp | 855 | 40.3 | +16.7 |
| Labour | Jeff Love | 845 | 39.8 | +8.0 |
| Labour | Malcolm Nicholls | 814 | 38.3 | +12.7 |
| Conservative | Sally Rudd | 805 | 37.9 | +15.6 |
| Liberal Democrats | Andrew Wemyss | 291 | 13.7 | +4.4 |
| Liberal Democrats | Eric Durber | 199 | 9.4 | +1.2 |
| Majority | | | | |
| Rejected ballots | | 42 | 1.9 | |
| Turnout | | 2,123 | 33.5 | |
| Registered electors | | 6,468 | | |
| Labour hold | | Swing | | |
| Conservative gain from Liberal Democrats | | Swing | | |
| Conservative gain from Independent | | Swing | | |

Ian Wilkes was elected in 2018 as a Liberal Democrat.

=== Bradwell ===
Bradwell (3)
| Party | Candidate | Votes | % | ±% |
|---|---|---|---|---|
| Labour | Andrew Fox-Hewitt* | 1,006 | 51.2 | +5.6 |
| Labour | Lesley Richards | 926 | 47.2 | +5.3 |
| Labour | Annabel Lawley* | 922 | 47.0 | −3.3 |
| Conservative | Jade Hammersley | 812 | 41.4 | −4.0 |
| Conservative | Ben Simpson | 791 | 40.3 | −3.8 |
| Conservative | Jude Powell | 789 | 40.2 | −1.7 |
| Green | Jessica Mellor | 190 | 9.7 | +2.2 |
| Majority | | | | |
| Rejected ballots | | 24 | 1.2 | |
| Turnout | | 1,963 | 31.0 | |
| Registered electors | | 6,403 | | |
| Labour hold | | Swing | | |
| Labour hold | | Swing | | |
| Labour gain from Conservative | | Swing | | |

=== Clayton ===
Clayton (1)
| Party | Candidate | Votes | % | ±% |
|---|---|---|---|---|
| Conservative | Stephen Sweeney* | 402 | 51.0 | +3.0 |
| Labour | Elizabeth Shenton | 386 | 49.0 | +6.1 |
| Majority | | | | |
| Rejected ballots | | 12 | 1.5 | |
| Turnout | | 788 | 36.2 | |
| Registered electors | | 2,209 | | |
| Conservative hold | | Swing | | |

=== Crackley and Red Street ===
Crackley & Red Street (2)
| Party | Candidate | Votes | % | ±% |
|---|---|---|---|---|
| Labour | Joel Edgington-Plunkett | 549 | 45.4 | −3.9 |
| Conservative | Lilian Barker | 471 | 39.0 | −2.5 |
| Labour | Claire Radford | 470 | 38.9 | −3.9 |
| Conservative | Kevin Robinson | 411 | 34.0 | −5.1 |
| Liberal Democrats | Aidan Jenkins | 249 | 20.6 | N/A |
| Liberal Democrats | Kay Mitchell | 184 | 15.2 | N/A |
| Majority | | | | |
| Rejected ballots | | 20 | 1.6 | |
| Turnout | | 1,208 | 28.2 | |
| Registered electors | | 4,348 | | |
| Labour hold | | Swing | | |
| Conservative gain from Labour | | Swing | | |

=== Cross Heath ===
Cross Heath (2)
| Party | Candidate | Votes | % | ±% |
|---|---|---|---|---|
| Labour | Gillian Williams* | 683 | 60.3 | −0.9 |
| Labour | John Williams* | 633 | 55.9 | −4.6 |
| Conservative | Thomas Molloy | 365 | 32.2 | +5.6 |
| Conservative | John Heesom | 338 | 29.9 | +8.5 |
| Green | Will Wood | 132 | 11.7 | N/A |
| Majority | | | | |
| Rejected ballots | | 14 | 1.2 | |
| Turnout | | 1,132 | 28.3 | |
| Registered electors | | 4,055 | | |
| Labour hold | | Swing | | |
| Labour hold | | Swing | | |

=== Holditch and Chesterton ===
Holditch & Chesterton (2)
| Party | Candidate | Votes | % | ±% |
|---|---|---|---|---|
| Labour | David Grocott* | 621 | 66.0 | +9.0 |
| Labour | Sue Beeston | 532 | 56.5 | +3.3 |
| Conservative | Ken Owen* | 314 | 33.4 | +14.7 |
| Conservative | Adam Bagguley | 274 | 29.1 | +12.4 |
| Majority | | | | |
| Rejected ballots | | 22 | 2.3 | |
| Turnout | | 941 | 24.0 | |
| Registered electors | | 4,017 | | |
| Labour hold | | Swing | | |
| Labour hold | | Swing | | |

Ken Owen was elected at a 2019 by-election as an independent.

=== Keele ===
Keele (1)
| Party | Candidate | Votes | % | ±% |
|---|---|---|---|---|
| Labour | Dave Jones | 332 | 68.6 | +9.7 |
| Liberal Democrats | James Borg | 81 | 16.7 | −3.1 |
| Conservative | Arjun Patel | 71 | 14.7 | −1.1 |
| Majority | | | | |
| Rejected ballots | | 4 | 0.8 | |
| Turnout | | 484 | 36.3 | |
| Registered electors | | 1,345 | | |
| Labour hold | | Swing | | |

=== Kidsgrove and Ravenscliffe ===
Kidsgrove & Ravenscliffe (3)
| Party | Candidate | Votes | % | ±% |
|---|---|---|---|---|
| Conservative | Gill Burnett* | 1,090 | 56.4 | +17.4 |
| Conservative | Craig Skelding | 1,012 | 52.4 | +19.0 |
| Conservative | Simon Jones | 961 | 49.7 | +29.5 |
| Labour | Silvia Burgess* | 801 | 41.4 | +7.2 |
| Labour | Robert Moss | 734 | 38.0 | +4.9 |
| Labour | Sarah Pickup | 711 | 36.8 | +4.6 |
| TUSC | Becky Carter | 104 | 5.4 | N/A |
| Majority | | | | |
| Rejected ballots | | 45 | 2.3 | |
| Turnout | | 1,933 | 29.4 | |
| Registered electors | | 6,727 | | |
| Conservative hold | | Swing | | |
| Conservative gain from Labour | | Swing | | |
| Conservative hold | | Swing | | |

=== Knutton ===
Knutton (1)
| Party | Candidate | Votes | % | ±% |
|---|---|---|---|---|
| Labour | Steph Talbot | 239 | 47.9 | −26.8 |
| Conservative | Derrick Huckfield* | 172 | 34.5 | +9.2 |
| Independent | Beckie Currie | 88 | 17.6 | N/A |
| Majority | | | | |
| Rejected ballots | | 2 | 0.4 | |
| Turnout | | 499 | 25.0 | |
| Registered electors | | 2,002 | | |
| Labour hold | | Swing | | |

Derrick Huckfield had been elected in a by-election.

=== Loggerheads ===
Loggerheads (2)
| Party | Candidate | Votes | % | ±% |
|---|---|---|---|---|
| Conservative | Paul Northcott* | 744 | 62.4 | −15.2 |
| Conservative | Barry Panter* | 704 | 59.1 | −0.6 |
| Labour | Sylvia Butler | 396 | 33.2 | +15.0 |
| Labour | Helen Stuart | 395 | 33.1 | +18.1 |
| Majority | | | | |
| Rejected ballots | | 38 | 3.1 | |
| Turnout | | 1,192 | 34.0 | |
| Registered electors | | 3,619 | | |
| Conservative hold | | Swing | | |
| Conservative hold | | Swing | | |

=== Madeley and Betley ===
Madeley & Betley (2)
| Party | Candidate | Votes | % | ±% |
|---|---|---|---|---|
| Conservative | Simon White* | 1,087 | 68.0 | +11.0 |
| Conservative | Gary White* | 1,072 | 67.0 | +15.7 |
| Labour | Christopher Cooper | 505 | 31.6 | +16.3 |
| Labour | Thomas Wilson | 482 | 30.1 | +17.9 |
| Majority | | | | |
| Rejected ballots | | 44 | 2.7 | |
| Turnout | | 1,599 | 38.4 | |
| Registered electors | | 4,278 | | |
| Conservative gain from Independent | | Swing | | |
| Conservative gain from Independent | | Swing | | |

Simon White and Gary White were elected in 2018 as Independents.

=== Maer and Whitmore ===
Maer & Whitmore (1)
| Party | Candidate | Votes | % | ±% |
|---|---|---|---|---|
| Conservative | Amy Bryan | 573 | 72.3 | −17.4 |
| Labour | Dave Lee | 219 | 27.7 | +17.4 |
| Majority | | | | |
| Rejected ballots | | 15 | 1.9 | |
| Turnout | | 792 | 37.0 | |
| Registered electors | | 2,183 | | |
| Conservative hold | | Swing | | |

=== May Bank ===
May Bank (3)
| Party | Candidate | Votes | % | ±% |
|---|---|---|---|---|
| Conservative | John Tagg* | 1,081 | 50.3 | −6.5 |
| Conservative | Trevor Johnson* | 1,055 | 49.1 | −7.1 |
| Conservative | David Hutchison | 1,047 | 48.7 | −6.9 |
| Labour | Steve Stoddart | 1,033 | 48.1 | +14.8 |
| Labour | Joan Winfield | 1,012 | 47.1 | +14.3 |
| Labour | Nicholas Butler | 1,008 | 46.9 | +17.0 |
| Majority | | | | |
| Rejected ballots | | 75 | 3.4 | |
| Turnout | | 2,149 | 34.4 | |
| Registered electors | | 6,458 | | |
| Conservative hold | | Swing | | |
| Conservative hold | | Swing | | |
| Conservative hold | | Swing | | |

=== Newchapel and Mow Cop ===
Newchapel & Mow Cop (2)
| Party | Candidate | Votes | % | ±% |
|---|---|---|---|---|
| Conservative | Jill Waring* | 771 | 59.8 | +16.8 |
| Conservative | Paul Waring* | 713 | 55.3 | +16.2 |
| Labour | Claire Vodrey | 511 | 39.6 | +7.3 |
| Labour | Jason Owen | 491 | 38.1 | +6.4 |
| Majority | | | | |
| Rejected ballots | | 28 | 2.1 | |
| Turnout | | 1,290 | 29.3 | |
| Registered electors | | 4,493 | | |
| Conservative hold | | Swing | | |
| Conservative hold | | Swing | | |

=== Silverdale ===
Silverdale (2)
| Party | Candidate | Votes | % | ±% |
|---|---|---|---|---|
| Labour | Jacqueline Brown | 539 | 41.7 | −7.4 |
| Conservative | Rupert Adcock | 481 | 37.2 | −6.3 |
| Labour | Peter Radford | 429 | 33.2 | −14.2 |
| Conservative | Gregory Ellis | 377 | 29.2 | −1.1 |
| Independent | Tom Currie | 344 | 26.6 | N/A |
| Independent | Izaak Johnson | 144 | 11.1 | N/A |
| Majority | | | | |
| Rejected ballots | | 8 | 0.6 | |
| Turnout | | 1,293 | 32.2 | |
| Registered electors | | 4,045 | | |
| Labour hold | | Swing | | |
| Conservative gain from Labour | | Swing | | |

=== Talke and Butt Lane ===
Talke & Butt Lane (3)
| Party | Candidate | Votes | % | ±% |
|---|---|---|---|---|
| Labour | Sylvia Dymond* | 1,096 | 55.7 | −0.4 |
| Labour | David Allport | 1,012 | 51.4 | −8.2 |
| Labour | Michael Stubbs* | 952 | 48.4 | −0.3 |
| Conservative | Keri Walters | 870 | 44.2 | +23.2 |
| Conservative | Amy Wood | 843 | 42.9 | +22.4 |
| Conservative | Sharon Battiste | 794 | 40.4 | +20.1 |
| Majority | | | | |
| Rejected ballots | | 57 | 2.8 | |
| Turnout | | 1,967 | 29.9 | |
| Registered electors | | 6,773 | | |
| Labour hold | | Swing | | |
| Labour hold | | Swing | | |
| Labour hold | | Swing | | |

=== Thistleberry ===
Thistleberry (2)
| Party | Candidate | Votes | % | ±% |
|---|---|---|---|---|
| Conservative | Robert Bettley-Smith | 485 | 34.9 | +3.9 |
| Conservative | Joan Whieldon | 479 | 34.5 | +8.1 |
| Liberal Democrats | William Jones | 399 | 28.7 | −19.9 |
| Liberal Democrats | Hilary Jones | 365 | 26.3 | −15.7 |
| Labour | Benjamin Upson | 330 | 23.8 | +0.6 |
| Labour | Roger Wilkes | 276 | 19.9 | +1.4 |
| Independent | Graham Eagles | 238 | 17.1 | N/A |
| Majority | | | | |
| Rejected ballots | | 14 | 1.0 | |
| Turnout | | 1,388 | 36.8 | |
| Registered electors | | 3,805 | | |
| Conservative gain from Liberal Democrats | | Swing | | |
| Conservative gain from Liberal Democrats | | Swing | | |

=== Town ===
Town (2)
| Party | Candidate | Votes | % | ±% |
|---|---|---|---|---|
| Labour | Wendy Brockie | 665 | 64.0 | +8.8 |
| Labour | Ruth Wright* | 644 | 62.0 | +6.4 |
| Conservative | Conna Eynon | 309 | 29.7 | +8.8 |
| Conservative | Daniel Hill | 303 | 29.2 | +10.7 |
| Majority | | | | |
| Rejected ballots | | 22 | 2.1 | |
| Turnout | | 1,039 | 27.2 | |
| Registered electors | | 3,907 | | |
| Labour hold | | Swing | | |
| Labour hold | | Swing | | |

=== Westbury Park and Northwood ===
Westbury Park & Northwood (2)
| Party | Candidate | Votes | % | ±% |
|---|---|---|---|---|
| Conservative | Andrew Parker* | 783 | 59.8 | −5.3 |
| Conservative | Andrew Fear* | 775 | 59.2 | −3.4 |
| Labour | Lawrence Wayte | 489 | 37.3 | +3.8 |
| Labour | Leigh Hughes | 474 | 36.2 | +5.8 |
| Majority | | | | |
| Rejected ballots | | 36 | 2.7 | |
| Turnout | | 1,310 | 34.4 | |
| Registered electors | | 3,908 | | |
| Conservative hold | | Swing | | |
| Conservative hold | | Swing | | |

=== Westlands ===
Westlands (3)
| Party | Candidate | Votes | % | ±% |
|---|---|---|---|---|
| Conservative | Simon Tagg* | 1,344 | 58.6 | −6.4 |
| Conservative | Mark Holland* | 1,226 | 53.4 | −8.0 |
| Conservative | Gill Heesom* | 1,221 | 53.2 | −8.7 |
| Labour | Robert Hagan | 804 | 35.0 | +10.3 |
| Labour | Peter Lawrence | 746 | 32.5 | +8.8 |
| Labour | Paul Horton | 702 | 30.6 | +9.7 |
| Liberal Democrats | Robin Studd | 359 | 15.6 | +5.5 |
| Majority | | | | |
| Rejected ballots | | 51 | 2.2 | |
| Turnout | | 2,295 | 36.6 | |
| Registered electors | | 6,416 | | |
| Conservative hold | | Swing | | |
| Conservative hold | | Swing | | |
| Conservative hold | | Swing | | |

=== Wolstanton ===
Wolstanton (2)
| Party | Candidate | Votes | % | ±% |
|---|---|---|---|---|
| Labour | Phil Reece | 774 | 57.2 | +12.5 |
| Labour | Richard Gorton | 740 | 54.7 | +14.5 |
| Conservative | Julie Cooper* | 556 | 41.1 | −4.0 |
| Conservative | Simon Poole | 521 | 38.5 | −5.1 |
| Majority | | | | |
| Rejected ballots | | 36 | 2.6 | |
| Turnout | | 1,352 | 30.3 | |
| Registered electors | | 4,577 | | |
| Labour gain from Conservative | | Swing | | |
| Labour hold | | Swing | | |

== Changes 2022–2026 ==
- Sue Beeston, elected as a Labour councillor, left the party in November 2023 to sit as an independent. She subsequently joined the Conservative Group.
- In late March 2026, Reform UK councillor Lynn Dean had the whip suspended after the anti-racism campaign group Hope Not Hate uncovered posts on an undisclosed social media account containing racist comments about Black people and Muslims; Dean said she had already decided to leave the party. She resigned as councillor for Knutton on 1 April 2026, weeks before she would have faced re-election, remaining a Staffordshire county councillor for May Bank and Wolstanton. The Knutton seat was left vacant until the 2026 borough election.

=== By-elections ===
==== Audley ====
The by-election in the Audley ward was held following the resignation of Labour councillor Sue Moffatt.

Audley, 7 September 2023
| Party | Candidate | Votes | % | ±% |
|---|---|---|---|---|
| Labour | Rebekah Sioban Lewis | 732 | 46.1 | −2.7 |
| Conservative | Sally Jane Rudd | 438 | 27.6 | −10.9 |
| Liberal Democrats | Andrew Robert Wemyss | 355 | 22.4 | +9.7 |
| Independent | Duran Benjamin O'Dwyer | 63 | 4.0 | +4.0 |
| Majority | | 294 | | |
| Turnout | | | 24.8 | −8.7 |
| Labour hold | | Swing | +8.2 | |

==== Knutton ====
The by-election in Knutton was held following the resignation of Labour councillor Steph Talbot.

Knutton, 7 September 2023
| Party | Candidate | Votes | % | ±% |
|---|---|---|---|---|
| Labour | Robert Ian Moss | 153 | 49.0 | −1.1 |
| Conservative | Derrick Huckfield | 99 | 31.7 | +2.7 |
| Liberal Democrats | Aidan Mark Jenkins | 60 | 19.2 | N/A |
| Majority | | 54 | | |
| Turnout | | | 15.9 | −9.1 |
| Labour hold | | Swing | -1.6 | |

==== Madeley and Betley ====
The by-election to fill two seats in Madeley and Betley was held following the resignation of Conservative councillors Gary and Simon White, and polled on the same day as the UK parliamentary General Election in 2024.

Madeley and Betley (2 seats), 4 July 2024
| Party | Candidate | Votes | % | ±% |
|---|---|---|---|---|
| Conservative | Mandy Berrisford | 1,164 | | |
| Conservative | Jill Whitmore | 1,084 | | |
| Independent | Tanya Morgan | 1,066 | | |
| Labour | Tony Kearon | 856 | | |
| Labour | Claire Annette Radford | 736 | | |
| Turnout | | | 71.5 | +38.0 |
| Conservative hold | | Swing | | |
| Conservative hold | | Swing | | |

==== Town ====
The by-election in the Town ward was held following the resignation of Labour councillor Wendy Brockie.

Town, 23 January 2025
| Party | Candidate | Votes | % | ±% |
|---|---|---|---|---|
| Labour | Sheelagh Eileen Casey-Hulme | 309 | 39.9 | −28.4 |
| Conservative | Elliott Albert Lancaster | 226 | 29.2 | −2.5 |
| Reform | Neill Antony Walker | 168 | 21.7 | +21.7 |
| Liberal Democrats | Nigel Jones | 71 | 9.2 | +9.2 |
| Majority | | 83 | | |
| Turnout | | | 18.7 | −8.5 |
| Labour hold | | Swing | −25.9 | |

==== Knutton ====
The by-election in Knutton was held following the resignation of Labour councillor Robert Moss on 10 March 2025.

Knutton by-election: 1 May 2025
| Party | Candidate | Votes | % | ±% |
|---|---|---|---|---|
| Reform | Lynn Dean | 281 | 59.9 | N/A |
| Labour | Bayley Dickin | 123 | 26.2 | –21.7 |
| Conservative | Finn Swain | 65 | 13.9 | –20.6 |
| Majority | | 158 | 33.7 | N/A |
| Turnout | | 473 | 23.8 | –1.2 |
| Registered electors | | 1,991 | | |
| Reform gain from Labour | | | | |

==== Loggerheads ====
The by-election in Loggerheads was held following the death of Conservative councillor Barry Panter on 15 February 2025.

Loggerheads by-election: 1 May 2025
| Party | Candidate | Votes | % | ±% |
|---|---|---|---|---|
| Conservative | Andrew Turnock | 932 | 70.5 | +5.2 |
| Labour Co-op | Jeff Love | 390 | 29.5 | –5.2 |
| Majority | | 542 | 41.0 | N/A |
| Turnout | | 1,414 | 37.3 | +3.3 |
| Registered electors | | 3,795 | | |
| Conservative hold | | Swing | ▲5.2 | |
