= 2018 Newcastle-under-Lyme Borough Council election =

2018 UK local government election

← 2016	3 May 2018	2022 →

All 44 seats to Newcastle-under-Lyme Borough Council 23 seats needed for a majority

	First party	Second party	Third party
Leader	Tony Kearon	Simon Tagg	Marion Reddish
Party	Labour	Conservative	Liberal Democrats
Leader's seat	Keele	Westlands	Thistleberry
Last election	27 seats	21 seats	3 seats
Seats won	20	18	3
Seat change	▼7	▼3	Steady
Popular vote	25,469	27,381	3,516
Percentage	39.7%	42.7%	5.5%
	Fourth party	Fifth party	Sixth party
Party	Independent	UKIP	Green
Last election		2 seats	1 seat
Seats won	3	0	0
Seat change		▼2	▼1
Popular vote	5,859	991	917
Percentage	9.1%	1.5%	1.4%
- Results by ward
Leader before election
Simon Tagg
Conservative
No overall control
Leader after election
Simon Tagg
Conservative
No overall control

The 2018 Newcastle-under-Lyme Borough Council election took place on 3 May 2018 to elect members of Newcastle-under-Lyme Borough Council in England. It was held on the same day as other local elections.

Newcastle-under-Lyme Borough Council decided in November 2015 to move to whole council elections, starting from this election.

== Election summary ==
Party	Leader	Candidates	Seats	Votes	
Labour	Tony Kearon	44	20	25,469	39.7
Conservative	Simon Tagg	44	18	27,371	42.7
Liberal Democrat	Marion Reddish	15	3	3,516	5.5
UKIP		7	0	991	1.5
Green		6	0	917	1.4
Independent		13	3	5,859	9.1

== Ward results ==
=== Audley ===
Audley (3)
Party	Candidate	Votes	%	±%
Independent	Bert Proctor	986	44.0	
Labour	Sue Moffatt	818	36.5	
Liberal Democrats	Ian Wilkes	773	34.5	
Labour	Tom Heavey	714	31.8	
Labour	Ian Ashbolt	574	25.6	
Conservative	Linda Hailstones	529	23.6	
Conservative	Peter Hailstones	501	22.3	
Conservative	Lawrence Whitworth	357	15.9	
Liberal Democrats	Ben Ireland	208	9.3	
Liberal Democrats	Kay Mitchell	183	8.2	

=== Bradwell ===
Bradwell (3)
Party	Candidate	Votes	%	±%
Labour	Annabel Driver	974	50.3	
Labour	Andrew Fox-Hewitt	882	45.6	
Conservative	Jennifer Cooper	879	45.4	
Conservative	Dorinda Bailey	854	44.1	
Conservative	Chloe Mancey	810	41.9	
Labour	Robert Moss	810	41.9	
Green	Anthony Morris	146	7.5	
Liberal Democrats	Richard Virr	92	4.8	

=== Clayton ===
Clayton (1)
Party	Candidate	Votes	%	±%
Conservative	Stephen Sweeney	441	48.0	
Labour	Michael Shenton	394	42.9	
UKIP	Gary Fedtschyschak	52	5.7	
Liberal Democrats	Morgan-Ross Inwood	32	3.5	

=== Crackley and Red Street ===
Crackley and Red Street (2)
Party	Candidate	Votes	%	±%
Labour	Allison Gardner	566	49.3	
Labour	Sarah Pickup	491	42.8	
Conservative	Gail Benbow	476	41.5	
Conservative	David Cooper	448	39.1	
UKIP	Mark Barlow	140	12.2	

=== Cross Heath ===
Cross Heath (2)
Party	Candidate	Votes	%	±%
Labour	Gillian Williams	693	61.2	
Labour	John Williams	685	60.5	
Conservative	Rita Gilmore	301	26.6	
Conservative	John Heesom	243	21.4	
UKIP	Lynn Dean	150	13.2	

=== Holditch and Chesterton ===
Holditch and Chesterton (2)
Party	Candidate	Votes	%	±%
Labour Co-op	Emily Horsfall	566	57.0	
Labour Co-op	Christopher Spence	528	53.2	
Independent	Kenneth Owen	186	18.7	
Conservative	David Cooper	166	16.7	
Conservative	Thomas Cooper	144	14.5	
UKIP	Paul Daniels	105	10.6	
UKIP	Gordon Davies	75	7.6	
Liberal Democrats	Chris Moore	61	6.1	
Liberal Democrats	Arthur Richards	47	4.7	

=== Keele ===
Keele (1)
Party	Candidate	Votes	%	±%
Labour Co-op	Tony Kearon	291	58.9	
Liberal Democrats	James Borg	98	19.8	
Conservative	Dan Grice	78	15.8	
Green	Paul Usher	27	5.5	

=== Kidsgrove and Ravenscliffe ===
Kidsgrove and Ravenscliffe (3)
Party	Candidate	Votes	%	±%
Conservative	Gill Burnett	817	39.0	
Labour	Silvia Burgess	717	34.2	
Conservative	Helena Maxfield	700	33.4	
Labour	Laura Dillon	694	33.1	
Conservative	Kevin Johnson	688	32.8	
Labour	David Allport	675	32.2	
Independent	Simon Jones	423	20.2	
Independent	Darren Dawson	405	19.3	
UKIP	Geoffrey Locke	402	19.2	
Independent	Reg Bailey	327	15.6	

=== Knutton ===
Knutton (1)
Party	Candidate	Votes	%	±%
Labour Co-op	Brian Johnson	355	74.7	
Conservative	Joseph Swift	120	25.3	

=== Loggerheads ===
Loggerheads (2)
Party	Candidate	Votes	%	±%
Conservative	Paul Northcott	962	77.6	
Conservative	Barry Panter	740	59.7	
Labour	Deborah Faulks	226	18.2	
Labour	Deborah Fuller	186	15.0	
Liberal Democrats	David Beckett	131	10.6	

=== Madeley and Betley ===
Madeley and Betley (2)
Party	Candidate	Votes	%	±%
Independent	Simon White	936	57.0	
Independent	Gary White	842	51.3	
Conservative	Graham Hutton	500	30.5	
Conservative	Nathan White	323	19.7	
Labour	Liam Searle	252	15.3	
Labour	Thomas Wilson	201	12.2	
Liberal Democrats	Andrew Wemyss	100	6.1	

=== Maer and Whitmore ===
Maer and Whitmore (1)
Party	Candidate	Votes	%	±%
Conservative	David Harrison	654	89.7	
Labour	David Lee	75	10.3	

=== May Bank ===
May Bank (3)
Party	Candidate	Votes	%	±%
Conservative	John Tagg	1,244	56.8	
Conservative	Trevor Johnson	1,232	56.2	
Conservative	John Cooper	1,218	55.6	
Labour	Colin Eastwood	729	33.3	
Labour	Jacqueline Olszewski	718	32.8	
Labour	Lesley Richards	656	29.9	
Green	Sean Adam	253	11.5	

=== Newchapel and Mow Cop ===
Newchapel and Mow Cop (2)
Party	Candidate	Votes	%	±%
Conservative	Jill Waring	573	43.0	
Conservative	Paul Waring	521	39.1	
Labour	Angela Cooper	430	32.3	
Labour	Lynn Jackson	423	31.7	
Independent	Vic Jukes	355	26.6	
Independent	Nigel Morgan	304	22.8	

=== Silverdale ===
Silverdale (2)
Party	Candidate	Votes	%	±%
Labour Co-op	Amelia Rout	569	49.1	
Labour Co-op	David Jones	549	47.4	
Conservative	Derrick Huckfield	504	43.5	
Conservative	James Vernon	351	30.3	
UKIP	Thomas Spokes	67	5.8	

=== Talke and Butt Lane ===
Talke and Butt Lane (3)
Party	Candidate	Votes	%	±%
Labour Co-op	Kyle Robinson	1,226	59.6	
Labour Co-op	Sylvia Dymond	1,154	56.1	
Labour Co-op	Michael Stubbs	1,001	48.7	
Conservative	Nicholas Jellyman	432	21.0	
Conservative	Ben Lack	421	20.5	
Conservative	Graham Lovell	417	20.3	
Independent	Ray Williams	410	19.9	
Independent	Alexander Wright	407	19.8	

=== Thistleberry ===
Thistleberry (2)
Party	Candidate	Votes	%	±%
Liberal Democrats	Marion Reddish	713	48.6	
Liberal Democrats	June Walklate	616	42.0	
Conservative	Pamela Jellyman	455	31.0	
Conservative	Rachel Mundy	388	26.4	
Labour	Susan Forrester-O'Neill	341	23.2	
Labour	Roger Wilkes	271	18.5	
Green	Gordon Pearson	68	4.6	

=== Town ===
Town (2)
Party	Candidate	Votes	%	±%
Labour	Ruth Wright	659	55.6	
Labour	Elizabeth Shenton	654	55.2	
Conservative	Martin Johnson	248	20.9	
Conservative	Luke Mason	219	18.5	
Independent	Christopher Malkin	181	5.3	
Liberal Democrats	Hilary Jones	128	10.8	
Independent	Wenslie Naylon	97	8.2	
Liberal Democrats	Salwa El-Raheb-Booth	95	8.0	

=== Westbury Park and Northwood ===
Westbury Park and Northwood (2)
Party	Candidate	Votes	%	±%
Conservative	Andrew Parker	892	65.1	
Conservative	Andrew Fear	857	62.6	
Labour	David Beardmore	459	33.5	
Labour	Wendy Brockie	416	30.4	

=== Westlands ===
Westlands (3)
Party	Candidate	Votes	%	±%
Conservative	Simon Tagg	1,534	65.0	
Conservative	Gillian Heesom	1,460	61.9	
Conservative	Mark Holland	1,448	61.4	
Labour	Thomas Brayford	582	24.7	
Labour	Imogen Wilkes	558	23.7	
Labour	Solomon Gibson	494	20.9	
Green	Jade Taylor	270	11.4	
Liberal Democrats	Richard Whelan	239	10.1	

=== Wolstanton ===
Wolstanton (2)
Party	Candidate	Votes	%	±%
Conservative	Julie Cooper	644	45.1	
Labour	Mark Olszewski	639	44.7	
Conservative	David Woolley	622	43.6	
Labour	Joan Winfield	574	40.2	
Green	Ann Beirne	153	10.7	

== Changes 2018–2022 ==
=== By-elections ===
Holditch & Chesterton, 21 March 2019
Party	Candidate	Votes	%	±%
Independent	Kenneth Owen	282	40.3	+21.6
Labour	Peter Radford	268	38.3	−14.9
UKIP	Mark Barlow	86	12.3	+1.7
Conservative	Lawrence Whitworth	49	7.0	−9.7
SDP		14	2.0	N/A
Majority				
Turnout		699	17.1	
Independent gain from Labour		Swing		

Maer & Whitmore, 2 May 2019
Party	Candidate	Votes	%	±%
Conservative	Graham Hutton	629	86.6	−3.1
Liberal Democrats	Salwa El-Raheb Booth	97	13.4	N/A
Majority				
Turnout		726	37.0	
Conservative hold		Swing		

Holditch & Chesterton, 12 December 2019
Party	Candidate	Votes	%	±%
Labour	David Grocott	902	42.7	−14.3
Conservative	Peter Hailstones	762	36.1	+19.4
Independent	Lilian Barker	376	17.8	N/A
Liberal Democrats	Aidan Jenkins	72	3.4	−2.7
Majority				
Turnout		2,112	50.1	
Labour hold		Swing		

Knutton, 25 November 2021
Party	Candidate	Votes	%	±%
Conservative	Derrick Huckfield	188	51.1	+25.8
Labour	Stephanie Talbot	180	48.9	−25.8
Majority				
Turnout		368	18.3	
Conservative gain from Labour		Swing		

=== Changes of allegiance ===
Ian Wilkes, elected as a Liberal Democrat, joined the Conservatives in February 2020.

Four councillors elected as independents (Ken Owen, Bert Proctor, Gary White and Simon White) joined the Conservatives in November 2021, giving the party an overall majority on the council.

John Cooper, elected as a Conservative, left the party in January 2022 to sit as an independent.
