= 2007 Newcastle-under-Lyme Borough Council election =

2007 UK local government election

Results of the 2007 Newcastle-under-Lyme Borough Council election

Elections to Newcastle-under-Lyme Borough Council were held on 3 May 2007. One third of the council was up for election and the council stayed under no overall control.

After the election, the composition of the council was:

- Labour 20
- Conservative 20
- Liberal Democrat 18
- UK Independence Party 2

== Election result ==
Newcastle-under-Lyme local election result 2007
Party	Seats	Gains	Losses	Net gain/loss	Seats %	Votes %	Votes	+/−
Conservative	8	3	0	+3	40.0	31.7	8,791	+0.1%
Liberal Democrats	6	3	0	+3	30.0	24.5	6,811	-0.7%
Labour	4	0	6	-6	20.0	24.1	6,689	-3.4%
UKIP	2	1	0	+1	10.0	17.4	4,833	+3.1%
Green	0	0	0	0	0	1.2	331	-0.1%
Independent	0	0	1	-1	0	1.1	310	+1.0%

== Ward results ==
Audley and Bignall End
Party	Candidate	Votes	%	±%
Labour	Ann Beech	717	38.5	+2.0
Liberal Democrats	Tom Cicatello	612	32.9	−3.8
Conservative	Brenda Edwards	286	15.4	+5.4
UKIP	David Nixon	245	13.2	−3.5
Majority		105	5.6	
Turnout		1,860		
Labour hold		Swing		

Bradwell
Party	Candidate	Votes	%	±%
Labour	Sandra Hambleton	557	36.2	−5.1
Conservative	John Tagg	469	30.5	+9.6
UKIP	Donald Bowers	289	18.8	−1.1
Liberal Democrats	David Dugdale	225	14.6	−3.3
Majority		88	5.7	−14.7
Turnout		1,540		
Labour hold		Swing		

Butt Lane
Party	Candidate	Votes	%	±%
Liberal Democrats	Silvia Burgess	491	39.5	+5.1
Labour	John Macmillan	339	27.3	−7.2
UKIP	Garry Whitehurst	202	16.3	−1.2
Conservative	Iley Wainwright	108	8.7	−4.9
Independent	Maurice Leese	102	8.2	+8.2
Majority		152	12.2	
Turnout		1,242		
Liberal Democrats gain from Labour		Swing		

Chesterton
Party	Candidate	Votes	%	±%
Labour	Sandra Simpson	578	39.4	+8.4
UKIP	Mark Barlow	355	24.2	+5.4
Liberal Democrats	Trevor Johnson	325	22.2	−12.4
Conservative	Daniel Worley	209	14.3	−1.4
Majority		223	15.2	
Turnout		1,467		
Labour hold		Swing		

Cross Heath
Party	Candidate	Votes	%	±%
Labour	John Williams	633	44.7	−0.4
Liberal Democrats	Bob Rankin	336	23.7	+6.2
UKIP	Barry Milford	232	16.4	−4.3
Conservative	Glenys Davies	215	15.2	−1.5
Majority		297	21.0	−3.4
Turnout		1,416		
Labour hold		Swing		

Halmerend
Party	Candidate	Votes	%	±%
Liberal Democrats	David Becket	577	49.6	
Conservative	Alan Humphreys	223	19.2	
Labour	Trevor Sproston	219	18.8	
UKIP	Neville Benson	145	12.5	
Majority		354	30.4	
Turnout		1,164		
Liberal Democrats hold		Swing		

Keele
Party	Candidate	Votes	%	±%
Liberal Democrats	Wenslie Naylon	257	32.9	−3.0
Green	Savitha Piercy	224	28.6	−1.7
Conservative	Owen Meredith	144	18.4	−6.4
Labour	Gareth Snell	125	16.0	+8.3
UKIP	Wayne Harling	32	4.1	+2.8
Majority		33	4.3	−1.3
Turnout		782		
Liberal Democrats hold		Swing		

Kidsgrove
Party	Candidate	Votes	%	±%
Liberal Democrats	Sandra Bowyer	559	39.6	−9.9
Labour	Paul Waring	415	29.4	+0.5
UKIP	Glyn Rafferty	280	19.8	+8.3
Conservative	Matthew Lewis	159	11.3	+1.1
Majority		144	10.2	−10.4
Turnout		1,413		
Liberal Democrats gain from Labour		Swing		

Knutton and Silverdale
Party	Candidate	Votes	%	±%
UKIP	Derrick Huckfield	438	47.3	+12.4
Labour	David Leech	306	33.0	−7.1
Conservative	Jocelyn Budibent	107	11.6	−0.7
Liberal Democrats	Julian Colclough	75	8.1	−1.1
Majority		132	14.3	
Turnout		926		
UKIP gain from Labour		Swing		

Loggerheads and Whitmore
Party	Candidate	Votes	%	±%
Conservative	Brian Tomkins	1,431	68.0	−6.1
UKIP	David Howell	397	18.9	+11.2
Liberal Democrats	Anne Becket	275	13.1	+2.5
Majority		1,034	49.1	−14.4
Turnout		2,103		
Conservative hold		Swing		

Madeley
Party	Candidate	Votes	%	±%
Conservative	Helen Morris	502	35.7	+4.1
Liberal Democrats	Steve Burke	410	29.2	+1.2
Labour	Bill Sinnott	410	29.2	−4.6
UKIP	Joseph Bonfiglio	84	6.0	−0.6
Majority		92	6.5	
Turnout		1,406		
Conservative gain from Labour		Swing		

May Bank
Party	Candidate	Votes	%	±%
Conservative	Simon Tagg	1,227	62.9	+6.2
Labour	Stephen Harrison	310	15.9	−0.5
UKIP	Barbara Lewis	223	11.4	+3.2
Liberal Democrats	Chris Wain	191	9.8	−8.9
Majority		917	47.0	+9.0
Turnout		1,951		
Conservative hold		Swing		

Newchapel
Party	Candidate	Votes	%	±%
Conservative	Nora Salt	314	35.2	+35.2
Labour	Elsie Bates	258	29.0	−9.8
Liberal Democrats	Alan Bowyer	188	21.1	−14.0
UKIP	Susan Whitehurst	131	14.7	+14.7
Majority		56	6.2	
Turnout		891		
Conservative hold		Swing		

Ravenscliffe
Party	Candidate	Votes	%	±%
Conservative	Elizabeth Bishop	322	32.5	+9.2
Labour	Ray Astle	231	23.3	−22.0
Liberal Democrats	Geff Hall	224	22.6	−8.7
UKIP	Geoffrey Locke	213	21.5	+21.5
Majority		91	9.2	
Turnout		990		
Conservative gain from Labour		Swing		

Seabridge
Party	Candidate	Votes	%	±%
Conservative	Peter Hailstones	811	52.6	+8.8
Labour	David Beardmore	354	23.0	−1.2
Liberal Democrats	Carol Reddish	205	13.3	−2.1
UKIP	Paul Gregory	171	11.1	−5.4
Majority		457	29.6	+10.0
Turnout		1,541		
Conservative hold		Swing		

Silverdale and Park Site
Party	Candidate	Votes	%	±%
UKIP	Eileen Braithwaite	537	53.6	+21.7
Labour	George Cairns	282	28.1	−13.8
Conservative	Clive Moss	107	10.7	−2.8
Liberal Democrats	Betty Kinnersley	76	7.6	−5.2
Majority		255	25.5	
Turnout		1,002		
UKIP hold		Swing		

Talke
Party	Candidate	Votes	%	±%
Liberal Democrats	David Daniels	418	44.6	−9.8
Independent	Arthur Amos	208	22.2	+22.2
UKIP	Roger Ruddle	173	18.4	+18.4
Conservative	David Cooper	139	14.8	−2.7
Majority		210	22.4	−4.0
Turnout		938		
Liberal Democrats gain from Independent		Swing		

Thistleberry
Party	Candidate	Votes	%	±%
Liberal Democrats	Nigel Jones	949	54.0	+0.1
Conservative	Luciana Flackett	351	20.0	−2.1
Labour	Nicholas Butler	247	14.1	−0.2
UKIP	Dominic Arnold	210	12.0	+2.3
Majority		598	34.0	+2.2
Turnout		1,757		
Liberal Democrats hold		Swing		

Westlands
Party	Candidate	Votes	%	±%
Conservative	John Heesom	1,119	59.6	−0.7
Liberal Democrats	Michael Shenton	279	14.9	−3.1
Labour	Eileen Robinson	261	13.9	+0.9
UKIP	Pamela Jackson	217	11.6	+2.8
Majority		840	44.7	+2.4
Turnout		1,876		
Conservative hold		Swing		

Wolstanton
Party	Candidate	Votes	%	±%
Conservative	Tracy Taylor	548	36.5	+8.4
Labour	Michael Clarke	447	29.8	−2.1
UKIP	David Woolley	259	17.3	+1.5
Liberal Democrats	Dennis Richards	139	9.3	−5.5
Green	Anne Beirne	107	7.1	−2.3
Majority		101	6.7	
Turnout		1,500		
Conservative gain from Labour		Swing		
