= 2014 Newcastle-under-Lyme Borough Council election =

2014 UK local government election

Results of the 2014 Newcastle-under-Lyme Borough Council election

The 2014 Newcastle-under-Lyme Borough Council election took place on 22 May 2014 to elect members of Newcastle-under-Lyme Borough Council in England. This was on the same day as other local elections.

== Election result ==
Newcastle-under-Lyme Borough Council Election, 2014
Party	Seats	Gains	Losses	Net gain/loss	Seats %	Votes %	Votes	+/−
Labour	8	3	5	-2				
Conservative	6	0	0	0				
Liberal Democrats	1	0	4	-3				
UKIP	5	5	0	0				
Independent	0	0	0	0	0			
Green	1	1	0	0	0			
TUSC	0	0	0	0	0			
	0	0	0	0	0			
TOTAL	21	9	9	0		100%		
