= 2012 Newcastle-under-Lyme Borough Council election =

2012 UK local government election

Map of the results of the 2012 Newcastle-under-Lyme council election. Labour in red, Conservatives in blue and Liberal Democrats in yellow. Wards in grey were not contested in 2012.

The 2012 Newcastle-under-Lyme Borough Council election took place on 3 May 2012 to elect members of Newcastle-under-Lyme Council in England. This was on the same day as other 2012 United Kingdom local elections.

== Election result ==
Newcastle-under-Lyme Borough Council Election, 2012
Party	Seats	Gains	Losses	Net gain/loss	Seats %	Votes %	Votes	+/−
Labour	11	10	0	+10				
Conservative	6	0	5	-5				
Liberal Democrats	3	0	3	-3				
UKIP	0	0	2	-2	0			
Independent	0	0	0	0	0			
TUSC	0	0	0	0	0			
	0	0	0	0	0			
TOTAL	20	8	8	0		100%		

== Ward results ==
Spoilt votes not included below.

=== Audley & Bignall End ward ===
Audley & Bignall End
Party	Candidate	Votes	%	±%
Liberal Democrats	Ian Wilkes	712	47.5	−3.8
Labour	Philip Morgan	609	40.6	+18.1
Conservative	Simon Barnes	179	11.9	−5.3
Majority		103	6.9	
Turnout		1,500		
Liberal Democrats hold		Swing		

=== Bradwell ward ===
Bradwell
Party	Candidate	Votes	%	±%
Labour	Glyn Plant	972	67.8	+38.5
Conservative	John Tagg	391	27.3	−10.3
Liberal Democrats	Julian Colclough	70	4.9	−3.3
Majority		581	40.5	
Turnout		1,433		
Labour gain from Conservative		Swing		

=== Butt Lane ward ===
Butt Lane
Party	Candidate	Votes	%	±%
Labour	Silvia Burgess	676	60.5	+31.8
Liberal Democrats	Dennis Richards	313	28.0	−8.4
Conservative	Daniel Jellyman	128	11.5	−9.1
Majority		363	32.5	
Turnout		1,117		
Labour gain from Conservative		Swing		

=== Chesterton ward ===
Chesterton
Party	Candidate	Votes	%	±%
Labour	Hilda Johnson	804	68.7	+36.6
Conservative	Rita Gilmore	219	18.7	−3.0
Liberal Democrats	Mike Dolman	147	12.6	−10.8
Majority		585	50.0	
Turnout		1,170		
Labour hold		Swing		

=== Clayton ward ===
Clayton
Party	Candidate	Votes	%	±%
Conservative	Ann Heames	514	49.3	−3.1
Labour	Rob Wallace	431	35.7	+19.2
Liberal Democrats	Mavis Brown	97	9.3	−11.7
Majority		83	13.6	
Turnout		1,042		
Conservative hold		Swing		

=== Cross Heath ward ===
Cross Heath
Party	Candidate	Votes	%	±%
Labour	Joan Winfield	739	57.1	+21.2
UKIP	Nathan Jones	381	29.4	−7.7
Conservative	Andrew Firth	117	9.0	−8.1
Liberal Democrats	David Dugdale	58	4.5	−5.3
Majority		358	27.7	
Turnout		1,295		
Labour gain from UKIP		Swing		

=== Halmer End ward ===
Halmer End
Party	Candidate	Votes	%	±%
Liberal Democrats	Andrew Wemyss	482	45.8	−2.8
Labour	Paul Breuer	408	38.7	+20.5
Conservative	Adam Carney	163	15.5	−5.0
Majority		74	7.1	
Turnout		1,053		
Liberal Democrats hold		Swing		

=== Holditch ward ===
Holditch
Party	Candidate	Votes	%	±%
Labour	Sophia Baker	458	64.1	+26.5
UKIP	Eileen Braithwaite	193	27.0	−12.5
Liberal Democrats	Dennis Cornes	34	4.8	−5.6
Conservative	Alex Chadwick	30	4.2	−8.4
Majority		265	37.1	
Turnout		715		
Labour gain from UKIP		Swing		

=== Kidsgrove ward ===
Kidsgrove
Party	Candidate	Votes	%	±%
Labour	Reginald Bailey	802	66.3	+32.5
Conservative	James Vernon	153	12.6	−2.7
Liberal Democrats	Lynda Griffiths	146	12.1	−33.5
TUSC	Claire Vodrey	109	9.0	New
Majority		649	53.7	
Turnout		1,210		
Labour gain from Liberal Democrats		Swing		

=== Loggerheads & Whitmore ward ===
Loggerheads & Whitmore
Party	Candidate	Votes	%	±%
Conservative	Tracey Peers	N/A	N/A	N/A
Conservative hold		Swing		

=== May Bank ward ===
May Bank
Party	Candidate	Votes	%	±%
Conservative	Ian Matthews	869	51.1	−11.2
Labour	Stephen Harrison	538	31.6	+14.7
UKIP	Carol Lovatt	210	12.3	+4.9
Liberal Democrats	Michael Birkett	84	4.9	−8.5
Majority		331	19.5	
Turnout		1,701		
Conservative hold		Swing		

=== Newchapel ward ===
Newchapel
Party	Candidate	Votes	%	±%
Labour	Elsie Bates	386	53.1	+22.8
Conservative	Pamela Jellyman	248	34.1	−10.0
Liberal Democrats	Alan Brookes	54	7.4	−11.7
Independent	Michael Prosser	39	5.4	N/A
Majority		138	19.0	
Turnout		727		
Labour gain from Conservative		Swing		

=== Porthill ward ===
Porthill
Party	Candidate	Votes	%	±%
Conservative	John Cooper	422	43.0	−21.7
Labour	Steff Featherstone	373	38.0	+14.0
UKIP	Derrick Huckfield	152	15.5	N/A
Liberal Democrats	Eric Durber	34	3.5	−7.8
Majority		49	5.0	
Turnout		981		
Conservative hold		Swing		

=== Ravenscliffe ward ===
Ravenscliffe
Party	Candidate	Votes	%	±%
Labour	David Stringer	446	50.2	+27.8
UKIP	Geoffrey Locke	252	28.3	+9.5
Conservative	Stephen Blair	191	21.5	−18.4
Majority		194	21.9	
Turnout		889		
Labour gain from Conservative		Swing		

=== Seabridge ward ===
Seabridge
Party	Candidate	Votes	%	±%
Conservative	Chloe Mancey	668	54.2	+5.6
Labour	Danny Walker	450	36.5	+16.5
Liberal Democrats	Hilary Jones	114	9.3	−5.3
Majority		218	17.7	
Turnout		1,232		
Conservative hold		Swing		

=== Talke ward ===
Talke
Party	Candidate	Votes	%	±%
Labour	Mike Stubbs	460	53.8	+39.0
Liberal Democrats	Janet Parsons	267	31.2	−22.6
Conservative	Nicola Ralphs	128	15.0	−2.2
Majority		193	22.6	
Turnout		855		
Labour gain from Liberal Democrats		Swing		

=== Thistleberry ward ===
Thistleberry
Party	Candidate	Votes	%	±%
Liberal Democrats	Marion Reddish	757	44.0	−5.7
Labour	Jim Matthews	366	21.3	+8.7
Conservative	Jonathan Fernyhough	291	16.9	−12.8
Independent	Angela Drakakis-Smith	153	8.9	N/A
UKIP	Maria Foy	152	8.8	+0.9
Majority		391	22.7	
Turnout		1,719		
Liberal Democrats hold		Swing		

=== Town ward ===
Town
Party	Candidate	Votes	%	±%
Labour	Matt Taylor	465	49.1	+22.8
Liberal Democrats	Michael Shenton	258	27.2	−20.1
Conservative	Ian Gilmore	137	14.5	−5.0
UKIP	Wayne Harling	88	9.3	+2.3
Majority		207	21.9	
Turnout		948		
Labour gain from Liberal Democrats		Swing		

=== Westlands ward ===
Westlands
Party	Candidate	Votes	%	±%
Conservative	Linda Hailstones	962	60.0	−6.2
Labour	Steve Bainbridge	471	29.4	+17.9
Liberal Democrats	Carol Reddish	169	10.5	−5.1
Majority		491	30.6	
Turnout		1,602		
Conservative hold		Swing		

=== Wolstanton ward ===
Wolstanton
Party	Candidate	Votes	%	±%
Labour	Colin Eastwood	566	40.9	+16.5
Conservative	John Pedder	359	26.0	−4.0
UKIP	David Woolley	284	20.5	−9.0
Liberal Democrats	Mark Hammersley	131	9.5	−1.3
TUSC	Richard Steele	43	3.1	New
Majority		207	14.9	N/A
Turnout		1,383		
Labour gain from Conservative		Swing		
