= 2026 Newcastle-under-Lyme Borough Council election =

2026 English local government election

- 7 May 2026

All 44 seats to Newcastle-under-Lyme Borough Council 23 seats needed for a majority
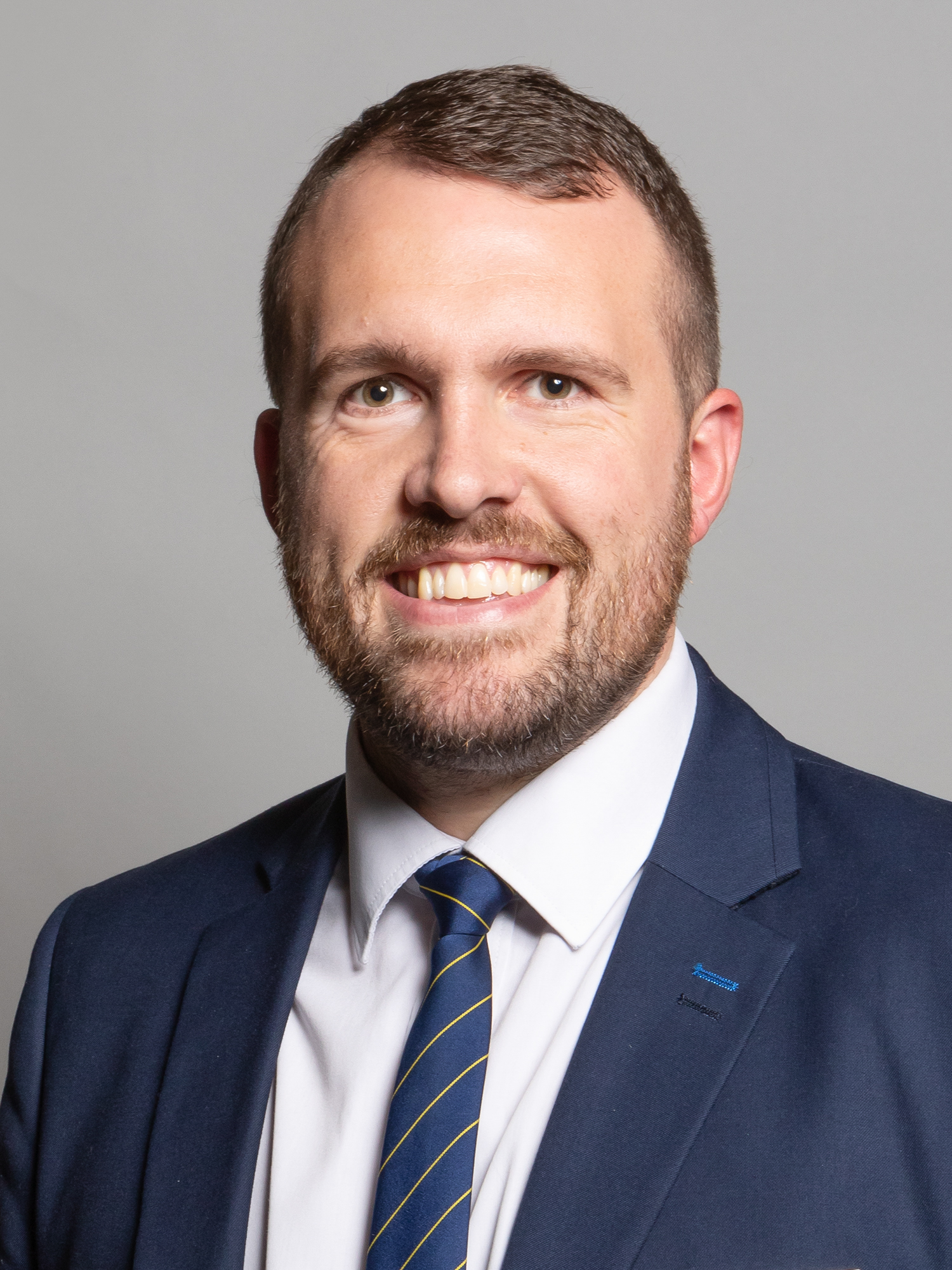
	First party	Second party	Third party
Leader	Jonathan Gullis	Simon Tagg	Dave Jones
Party	Reform	Conservative	Labour
Last election	Did not stand	25 seats, 49.5%	19 seats, 46.8%
Seats before	0	26	17
Seats won	27	15	2
Seat change	▲27	▼11	▼15
Popular vote	32,529	21,165	17,014
Percentage	41.1%	26.7%	21.5%
Swing	N/A	▼22.8%	▼25.3%
	Fourth party	Fifth party
Leader	Mark Jones	None
Party	Green	Independent
Last election	0 seats, 0.3%	0 seats, 0.5%
Seats before	0	1
Seats won	0	0
Seat change	Steady	▼1
Popular vote	6,054	467
Percentage	7.6%	0.6%
Swing	▲7.3%	▲0.1%
- Winner of each seat at the 2026 Newcastle-under-Lyme Borough Council election.
Leader before election
Simon Tagg
Conservative
Leader after election
Jonathan Gullis
Reform

The 2026 Newcastle-under-Lyme Borough Council election was held on Thursday 7 May 2026 to elect all 44 councillors who serve on Newcastle-under-Lyme Borough Council. It was held alongside council elections across England.

Prior to the election, the council was under Conservative majority control. Reform UK, which had held no seats on the council immediately before the election, won 27 seats, giving them an overall majority. The Conservatives won 15 seats and Labour won 2 seats. Reform chose Jonathan Gullis to be its new group leader after the election. He was formally appointed as the new leader of the council at the subsequent annual council meeting on 20 May 2026.

== Background ==
Simon Tagg had served as Leader of Newcastle-under-Lyme Borough Council since December 2017. In the 2025 Staffordshire County Council election, Newcastle-under-Lyme experienced a significant political shift towards Reform, which secured eight of the nine available seats in the area and 44.7% of the total vote. Labour failed to win any seats, while the Conservatives retained only one.

Reform gained its first seat on the council earlier in May 2025 through a by-election victory in Knutton. Lynn Dean, the elected councillor for Knutton, had the whip suspended by Reform UK in late March 2026 following allegations of racist comments made on social media, uncovered by the anti-racism campaign group Hope Not Hate; Dean said she had already decided to leave the party. She resigned as councillor for Knutton on 1 April 2026, weeks before she would have faced re-election, remaining a Staffordshire county councillor for May Bank and Wolstanton; the Knutton seat was left vacant until the 2026 borough election.

Following his defection from the Conservative Party in December 2025, Jonathan Gullis, the former MP for Stoke-on-Trent North, announced his candidacy for the Kidsgrove and Ravenscliffe ward representing Reform UK. Additionally, the former MP for Stafford, Jeremy Lefroy announced he was standing for candidacy for the Maer and Whitmore ward representing the Conservatives. Both were elected.

A major topic of local concern was the proposed reorganisation of local government, with widespread opposition to the government's plans to potentially merge Staffordshire Moorlands, Stoke-on-Trent, and Newcastle-under-Lyme councils. A large number of residents had signed a petition protesting these proposals due to the prospect of inheriting the large debt accrued by Stoke-on-Trent. Despite these efforts, the merger was confirmed in July 2026. The council is set to be abolished in April 2028.

== Election result ==
2026 Newcastle-under-Lyme Borough Council election
Party	Candidates	Seats	Gains	Losses	Net gain/loss	Seats %	Votes %	Votes	+/−
Reform	44	27	27	0	▲27	61.4	41.1	32,529	N/A
Conservative	44	15	0	11	▼11	34.1	26.7	21,165	–22.8
Labour	44	2	0	15	▼15	4.5	21.5	17,014	–25.3
Green	21	0	0	0	Steady	0.0	7.6	6,054	+7.3
Liberal Democrats	8	0	0	0	Steady	0.0	2.0	1,600	–0.7
Independent	2	0	0	0	▼1	0.0	0.6	467	+0.1
The Potteries Party	1	0	0	0	Steady	0.0	0.4	304	N/A
TUSC	1	0	0	0	Steady	0.0	0.1	77	–0.1

== Ward results ==
=== Audley ===
Audley (3 seats)
Party	Candidate	Votes	%	±%
Reform	Rhys Machin	1,098	47.4	N/A
Reform	Patricia Harrison	1,004	43.4	N/A
Reform	Janice Sain-Reiners	858	37.1	N/A
Conservative	Nick Crisp*	557	24.1	–17.5
Conservative	Ian Wilkes*	539	23.3	–17.0
Conservative	Sally Rudd	492	21.2	–16.7
Liberal Democrats	Maggie Babb	380	16.4	+2.7
Labour	Peter Lawrence	373	16.1	–36.7
Labour	Claire Vodrey	372	16.1	–23.7
Labour	John Sutton	353	15.2	–23.1
Liberal Democrats	Andrew Wemyss	340	14.7	+5.3
The Potteries Party	Tom Heavey	304	13.1	N/A
Liberal Democrats	Eric Durber	277	12.0	N/A
Turnout		2,473	38.4	+4.9
Registered electors		6,435		
Reform gain from Labour				
Reform gain from Conservative				
Reform gain from Conservative				

=== Bradwell ===
Bradwell (3 seats)
Party	Candidate	Votes	%	±%
Reform	Pamela Jellyman	1,096	46.9	N/A
Reform	Ben Simpson	1,091	46.9	N/A
Reform	Glenn Tift	1,024	44.0	N/A
Labour Co-op	Andrew Fox-Hewitt*	586	27.1	–24.1
Labour Co-op	Lesley Richards*	502	23.2	–24.0
Labour Co-op	Rebekah Lewis*	465	21.5	–25.5
Conservative	Julie Cooper	407	18.8	–22.6
Conservative	Jeanette Hodges	347	16.1	–24.2
Conservative	Jude Powell	345	16.0	–24.2
Green	Liam Shirley	328	15.2	+5.5
Green	Harry Smith	293	13.6	N/A
Turnout		2,336	36.2	+5.2
Registered electors		6,454		
Reform gain from Labour				
Reform gain from Labour				
Reform gain from Labour				

Rebekah Lewis was an incumbent for the Audley ward.

=== Clayton ===
Clayton
Party	Candidate	Votes	%	±%
Reform	Paul Wood	322	37.2	N/A
Conservative	Stephen Sweeney*	302	34.9	–16.1
Labour	Leigh Hughes	204	23.6	–25.4
Liberal Democrats	Anja Winter	68	7.9	N/A
Majority		20	2.2	N/A
Turnout		904	40.3	+4.1
Registered electors		2,243		
Reform gain from Conservative				

=== Crackley & Red Street ===
Crackley & Red Street (2 seats)
Party	Candidate	Votes	%	±%
Reform	Vanessa Renshaw	813	53.1	N/A
Reform	Peter Walton	785	51.2	N/A
Conservative	Lilian Barker*	390	25.5	–13.5
Labour	Joel Edgington-Plunkett*	316	20.6	–24.8
Conservative	Conna Eynon	314	20.5	N/A
Labour	Janet Pazio	267	17.4	N/A
Green	Deborah Percy	179	11.7	N/A
Turnout		1,607	36.6	+8.4
Registered electors		4,389		
Reform gain from Labour				
Reform gain from Conservative				

=== Cross Heath ===
Cross Heath (2 seats)
Party	Candidate	Votes	%	±%
Reform	Mark Harrison	666	48.4	N/A
Reform	Christopher Saxton	589	42.8	N/A
Labour Co-op	Gill Williams*	448	32.6	–27.7
Labour Co-op	John Williams*	371	27.0	–28.9
Green	Natalie Soleiman	266	19.3	N/A
Conservative	Thomas Molloy	239	17.4	–14.8
Conservative	Tom Wytcherley	172	12.5	N/A
Turnout		1,487	34.4	+6.1
Registered electors		4,321		
Reform gain from Labour Co-op				
Reform gain from Labour Co-op				

=== Holditch & Chesterton ===
Holditch & Chesterton (2 seats)
Party	Candidate	Votes	%	±%
Reform	Wayne Barber	566	54.5	N/A
Reform	Jon Chamberlain	554	53.3	N/A
Labour	David Grocott*	369	35.5	–30.5
Labour	Precious Osode	315	30.3	N/A
Conservative	Ken Owen	168	16.2	–17.2
Conservative	Kevin Robinson	105	10.1	N/A
Turnout		1,089	27.0	+3.0
Registered electors		4,029		
Reform gain from Independent				
Reform gain from Labour				

=== Keele ===
Keele
Party	Candidate	Votes	%	±%
Labour	Dave Jones*	143	30.2	–38.4
Green	Sami Islam	131	27.6	N/A
Conservative	Wenslie Naylon	118	24.9	N/A
Reform	James Vernon	82	17.3	N/A
Majority		12	2.5	N/A
Turnout		475	47.1	+10.8
Registered electors		1,008		
Labour hold				

=== Kidsgrove & Ravenscliffe ===
Kidsgrove & Ravenscliffe (3 seats)
Party	Candidate	Votes	%	±%
Reform	Jonathan Gullis	1,335	61.5	N/A
Reform	Charlie Clarke	1,218	56.1	N/A
Reform	Olivia Wozny	1,126	51.8	N/A
Labour	Silvia Burgess	546	25.1	–16.3
Labour	Mark Allen	492	22.7	N/A
Labour	Jason Owen	388	17.9	N/A
Conservative	Simon Jones	328	15.1	–34.6
Green	Kienen Catterall	273	12.6	N/A
Conservative	Michael Dowler	249	11.5	N/A
Green	Adam Rollison	244	11.2	N/A
Conservative	John Heesom	239	11.0	N/A
TUSC	Rebecca Carter	77	3.5	–1.9
Turnout		2,358	35.0	+5.6
Registered electors		6,736		
Reform gain from Conservative				
Reform gain from Conservative				
Reform gain from Conservative				

=== Knutton ===
Knutton
Party	Candidate	Votes	%	±%
Reform	Graham Shaw	359	66.2	N/A
Labour	Joshua Gilbert	129	23.8	–24.1
Conservative	James Dowler	54	10.0	–24.5
Majority		230	42.3	N/A
Turnout		544	27.4	+2.4
Registered electors		1,988		
Reform hold				

=== Loggerheads ===
Loggerheads (2 seats)
Party	Candidate	Votes	%	±%
Conservative	Graham Sedgley	805	47.4	N/A
Conservative	Andrew Turnock	730	42.9	N/A
Reform	Robert Selwood	615	36.2	N/A
Reform	Phillip Watts	532	31.3	N/A
Labour	Jeff Love	274	16.1	N/A
Labour	Nigel Hadfield	242	14.2	N/A
Green	Grant Robertson	202	11.9	N/A
Turnout		1,833	47.7	+13.7
Registered electors		3,845		
Conservative hold				
Conservative hold				

=== Madeley & Betley ===
Madeley & Betley (2 seats)
Party	Candidate	Votes	%	±%
Conservative	Jill Whitmore	884	47.8	N/A
Conservative	Robert Bettley-Smith	832	45.0	N/A
Reform	Vicky England	549	29.7	N/A
Reform	Neill Walker	533	28.8	N/A
Labour	Elaine Blake	249	13.5	N/A
Green	Kerri Jackman	241	13.0	N/A
Green	Steve French	237	12.8	N/A
Labour	Moonoon Jawadin	173	9.4	N/A
Turnout		1,901	43.9	+5.5
Registered electors		4,333		
Conservative hold				
Conservative hold				

Robert Bettley-Smith is an incumbent for the Thistleberry ward.

Neill Walker was the Reform UK candidate for the Newcastle-under-Lyme constituency at the 2024 General Election.

=== Maer & Whitmore ===
Maer & Whitmore
Party	Candidate	Votes	%	±%
Conservative	Jeremy Lefroy	562	50.1	N/A
Reform	Richard Woodward	428	38.1	N/A
Labour	Dave Lee	132	11.8	–15.9
Majority		134	11.8	N/A
Turnout		1,132	50.0	+13.0
Registered electors		2,266		
Conservative hold				

=== May Bank ===
May Bank (3 seats)
Party	Candidate	Votes	%	±%
Conservative	John Tagg	948	38.4	–11.9
Conservative	David Hutchison*	928	37.6	–11.1
Conservative	Finn Swain	834	33.8	N/A
Labour	Jackie Olszewski	812	32.9	N/A
Reform	Deborah Bailey	721	29.2	N/A
Labour	Bayley Dickin	714	28.9	N/A
Labour	Anthony-Claret Onwutalobi	702	28.4	N/A
Reform	Craig Rolinson	675	27.3	N/A
Reform	Stefan Whittaker	636	25.8	N/A
Green	Oliver Kane	439	17.8	N/A
Turnout		2,678	41.6	+7.2
Registered electors		6,442		
Conservative hold				
Conservative hold				
Conservative hold				

=== Newchapel & Mow Cop ===
Newchapel & Mow Cop (2 seats)
Party	Candidate	Votes	%	±%
Reform	Jonathan Downs	968	54.7	N/A
Reform	Scott Stevenson	911	51.5	N/A
Labour	Keith Cooper	381	21.5	N/A
Labour	Sarah Pickup	356	20.1	N/A
Conservative	Cressida Dickens	251	14.2	N/A
Independent	Gordon Davies	236	13.3	N/A
Independent	Ray Williams	231	13.1	N/A
Conservative	Jozsef Spekker	204	11.5	N/A
Turnout		1,838	41.2	+11.9
Registered electors		4,465		
Reform gain from Conservative				
Reform gain from Conservative				

=== Silverdale ===
Silverdale (2 seats)
Party	Candidate	Votes	%	±%
Reform	Martyn Ashworth	735	56.1	N/A
Reform	Ian Sparks	670	51.1	N/A
Labour	Sylvia Butler	361	27.5	N/A
Labour	Thomas Wilson	293	22.3	N/A
Green	Jamie Tomkinson	218	16.6	N/A
Conservative	George McBride	199	15.2	N/A
Conservative	Shauney Connor	146	11.1	N/A
Turnout		1,439	34.5	+2.3
Registered electors		4,176		
Reform gain from Labour				
Reform gain from Conservative				

=== Talke & Butt Lane ===
Talke & Butt Lane (3 seats)
Party	Candidate	Votes	%	±%
Reform	Gary Evans	1,306	57.8	N/A
Reform	Martin Rogerson	1,259	55.7	N/A
Reform	Simon Kasperowicz	1,224	54.2	N/A
Labour Co-op	Sylvia Dymond*	746	33.0	–22.7
Labour Co-op	David Allport*	712	31.5	–19.9
Labour Co-op	Michael Stubbs*	680	30.1	–18.3
Conservative	Julie Dunlevy	306	13.5	N/A
Conservative	Laura Matthews	272	12.0	N/A
Conservative	Trevor Johnson	270	12.0	N/A
Turnout		2,392	32.5	+2.6
Registered electors		6,799		
Reform gain from Labour Co-op				
Reform gain from Labour Co-op				
Reform gain from Labour Co-op				

=== Thistleberry ===
Thistleberry (2 seats)
Party	Candidate	Votes	%	±%
Conservative	Sue Beeston	607	40.5	N/A
Conservative	Joan Whieldon*	554	36.9	+2.4
Reform	Richard Sellers-Smith	405	27.0	N/A
Reform	Chris Sweeney	391	26.1	N/A
Labour	Margaret Wilkes	256	17.1	N/A
Liberal Democrats	Hilary Jones	210	14.0	–12.3
Green	Christopher Mueller	200	13.3	N/A
Labour	Roger Wilkes	200	13.3	–6.6
Liberal Democrats	Nigel Jones	177	11.8	N/A
Turnout		1,582	39.5	+2.7
Registered electors		4,005		
Conservative hold				
Conservative hold				

=== Town ===
Town (2 seats)
Party	Candidate	Votes	%	±%
Labour	Sheelagh Casey-Hulme	345	30.1	N/A
Reform	Christine Duffy	331	28.9	N/A
Reform	Thomas Edgington	317	27.7	N/A
Labour	Ruth Wright*	301	26.3	–35.7
Green	Nick Chidlow	263	23.0	N/A
Green	Mark Jones	243	21.2	N/A
Conservative	Amanda Berrisford	197	17.2	N/A
Conservative	Ian Gilmore	145	12.7	N/A
Liberal Democrats	James Borg	84	7.3	N/A
Liberal Democrats	Morgan-Ross Inwood	64	5.6	N/A
Turnout		1,206	29.7	+2.5
Registered electors		4,066		
Labour hold				
Reform gain from Labour				

=== Westbury Park & Northwood ===
Westbury Park & Northwood (2 seats)
Party	Candidate	Votes	%	±%
Conservative	Andrew Fear*	683	40.2	–19.0
Conservative	Andrew Parker*	675	39.8	–20.0
Reform	David Gameson	571	33.6	N/A
Reform	Adam Griffiths	568	33.5	N/A
Labour	Luke Bland	238	14.0	N/A
Green	Stephen Axon	227	13.4	N/A
Labour	Richard Parkes	222	13.1	N/A
Green	Thomas Taylor	212	12.5	N/A
Turnout		1,736	44.7	+10.3
Registered electors		3,884		
Conservative hold				
Conservative hold				

=== Westlands ===
Westlands (3 seats)
Party	Candidate	Votes	%	±%
Conservative	Simon Tagg*	1,480	49.3	–9.3
Conservative	Gillian Heesom*	1,296	43.1	–1.4
Conservative	Mark Holland*	1,282	42.7	–10.7
Reform	Keith Parker	781	26.0	N/A
Reform	Garry Proctor	763	25.4	N/A
Reform	Gary Fedtschyschak	723	24.1	N/A
Green	Jaffar Khan	610	20.3	N/A
Green	Kyle Bolderson	538	17.9	N/A
Green	Rosa Dilling	466	15.5	N/A
Labour	Nicholas Butler	369	12.3	N/A
Labour	Mike Melling	361	12.0	N/A
Labour	Carol Stimpson	345	11.5	N/A
Turnout		3,103	48.3	+11.7
Registered electors		6,419		
Conservative hold				
Conservative hold				
Conservative hold				

=== Wolstanton ===
Wolstanton (2 seats)
Party	Candidate	Votes	%	±%
Reform	Christopher Bailey	688	43.1	N/A
Reform	Andrew Fisher	643	40.2	N/A
Labour	Philip Reece*	466	29.2	–28.0
Labour	Mark Olszewski	445	27.8	N/A
Conservative	Philip Hodges	369	23.1	N/A
Conservative	Shaun McDonagh	341	21.3	N/A
Green	Robbie Trickett	244	15.3	N/A
Turnout		1,721	38.2	+7.9
Registered electors		4,510		
Reform gain from Labour				
Reform gain from Labour				

== Post-election changes ==
=== Town by-election ===
A by-election was called for the Town ward following the resignation of Reform UK councillor Christine Duffy, whose resignation letter was dated 20 August 2026 and received by the council on 21 August 2026. The ward's other councillor, Sheelagh Casey-Hulme, was unaffected. A date for the by-election had not yet been confirmed as of early September 2026.

Town by-election, 8 October 2026
Party	Candidate	Votes	%	±%
Labour	Andrew Fox-Hewitt	431	46.2	+18.0
Reform	Adam Griffiths	249	26.7	−0.4
Green	Mark Jones	115	12.3	−9.2
Conservative	Conna Eynon	110	11.8	−4.3
Liberal Democrats	Morgan Inwood	27	2.9	−4.0
Majority		182	19.5	N/A
Rejected ballots		2	0.2	
Turnout		932	23.2	−6.5
Registered electors		4,026		
Labour gain from Reform		Swing	+9.2	
