= Talke (ward) =

Former electoral ward in Staffordshire, England

Coordinates: 53.071°N 2.266°W

Talke was a ward in the Borough of Newcastle-under-Lyme. It covered the villages of Talke and Talke Pits. As of the 2018 Newcastle-under-Lyme Borough Council election this ward has been merged with Butt Lane ward, to form the Talke and Butt Lane Ward.
