= Ravenscliffe =

Ravenscliffe may refer to:

== Places ==
- Ravenscliffe, Ontario, Canada
- Ravenscliffe (ward), in the Borough of Newcastle-under-Lyme, Staffordshire, England
- Ravenscliffe, West Yorkshire, in the Eccleshill ward of the city of Bradford, West Yorkshire, England

== Other ==
- Ravenscliffe, a novel of 1851 by Anne Marsh-Caldwell
