= Knutton and Silverdale (ward) =

Coordinates: 53.019°N 2.252°W

Knutton and Silverdale was a ward in the Borough of Newcastle-under-Lyme, in the county of Staffordshire, England. It covered the area of Knutton and the north east end of Silverdale. In 2011 it had a population of 4313.
