= Anne Marsh =

Anne Marsh may refer to:

- Anne Marsh-Caldwell (1791–1874), English novelist
- Anne Marsh (artist), Australian sculptor and feminist art theorist
- Anne Steele Marsh (1901–1995), American painter and printmaker

== See also ==
- Ann Marsh (born 1971), American fencer
- Anna Marsh (1770–1834), American philanthropist
