= Victoria Ground =

Football ground of Stoke City, 1878 to 1997

The Victoria Ground
- The Vic
- Interactive map of The Victoria Ground
- Full name: The Victoria Ground
- Location: Stoke-on-Trent
- Coordinates: 52°59′57″N 2°10′57″W
- Owner: Stoke City
- Capacity: 56,000 (approx 25,000 before it closed)

Construction
- Built: 1878
- Opened: March 1878
- Closed: May 1997
- Demolished: June 1997

Tenant
- Stoke City (1878–1997)

The Victoria Ground was the home ground of Stoke City from 1878 until 1997, when the club relocated to the Britannia Stadium after 119 years. At the time of its demolition it was the oldest operational ground in the Football League.

== History ==
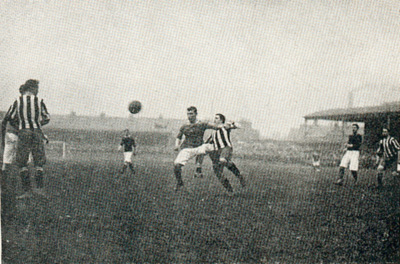
The Victoria Ground hosted seven FA Cup semi-finals, one of these was this in 1906, between Woolwich Arsenal and Newcastle United.

The Victoria Ground had been Stoke City's home since March 1878 and the first match was the inaugural Staffordshire Cup final against Talke Rangers on 28 March 1878, Stoke won 1–0 before 2,500 spectators. The ground took its name from the nearby Victoria Hotel and was originally an oval shape, built to accommodate a running track and used by the local athletic club. There was an open grass bank at each end, and a small but compact wooden stand on the east side (Boothen Road) capable of housing 1,000 people. Opposite this stand was another bank which could hold 4,000. The ground remained this way for 30 years during which time Stoke had become members of the Football League. The first league match at the Victoria Ground was on 8 September 1888 and ended in a 2–0 defeat against West Bromwich Albion. Stoke suffered financial difficulties and dropped out of the league in 1908 and attendances varied during their time out. Stoke got back into the league in 1919 and the ground had now been improved considerably. There were two good sized grandstands and an extra wooden one which was situated opposite the main stand and could hold 1,000 supporters.

The players changing rooms were set in the corner of the ground which also included a stove so players could keep warm. Above the changing 'hut' was the directors box, a rather primitive building but could hold around 12 people. During the early 1920s a new, mainly wooden main stand was erected alongside the 'hut' and this could hold 2,000 fans. By 1930 Stoke had added 'City' to their name and the Boothen End was terraced and later covered, and consequently the ground lost its oval shape. 1935, when the likes of Stanley Matthews was beginning to draw in the crowds, the Butler Street Stand was built, giving seating to 5,000 people. In front of the seats was a small paddock, room for another 2,000 and it took the ground capacity to around the 45,000 mark. A record crowd of 51,380 packed into the Victoria Ground on 29 March 1937 to watch a First Division match against Arsenal. During World War II the Butler Street Stand was used as an army storage camp.

Floodlights were installed at the ground in 1956 and local rivals Port Vale marked the 'official' switching on ceremony by playing Stoke in a friendly on 10 October 1956. In 1960 another new main stand was built and the dressing rooms were revamped. In the summer of 1963 concrete was laid on the paddock terracing and it was the Stoke players who helped lay it as part of a team bonding scheme. More improvements continued in the 1960s and the ground remained in a good condition until January 1976.

Over the weekend of the 3/4 January 1976, with Stoke playing Tottenham Hotspur away in the FA Cup, winds of hurricane force battered the Stoke-on-Trent area and especially the Victoria Ground for around eight hours. The strong winds blew a section of the roof off the Butler Street Stand leaving only the west corner intact. Top priority was to put the roof back in order that the replay against Tottenham could take place on 7 January. However, on the day of the match as workmen were replacing timber supports and erecting scaffolding, some of the supports collapsed and a number of workers were injured, The match itself was cancelled on safety grounds. Stoke had to play one home league match against Middlesbrough at Vale Park on 17 January and the Victoria Ground was reopened by 24 January in time for Stoke to play Tottenham in the cup.

The final improvements to the ground were made during the 1980s with the Stanley Matthews suite being opened as well as a new club shop and offices.

With the Taylor Report of January 1990 requiring all clubs in the top two division of English football have an all-seater stadium by August 1994, the club drew up plans to meet the requirements at the Victoria Ground, in spite of relegation to the Third Division in 1990, as the club was intent on re-establishing itself in the top two divisions – which was achieved three years later.

However, after a few years, Stoke chairman Peter Coates instead decided to move the club to a new location and so in 1997 Stoke left the Victoria Ground after 119 years for the new 28,000-seater Britannia Stadium at Trentham Lakes. The final league match at the Victoria was on 4 May 1997 against the first opponents West Bromwich Albion, Stoke won 2–1 with Graham Kavanagh scoring the final Stoke goal.

The Victoria Ground was demolished in June 1997 and the site stood empty for over 20-years until a housing development was built in 2019 named Victoria Park with the streets named after former Stoke players and managers.
