= Jeremy Lefroy =

British Conservative politician

Cllr Jeremy Lefroy
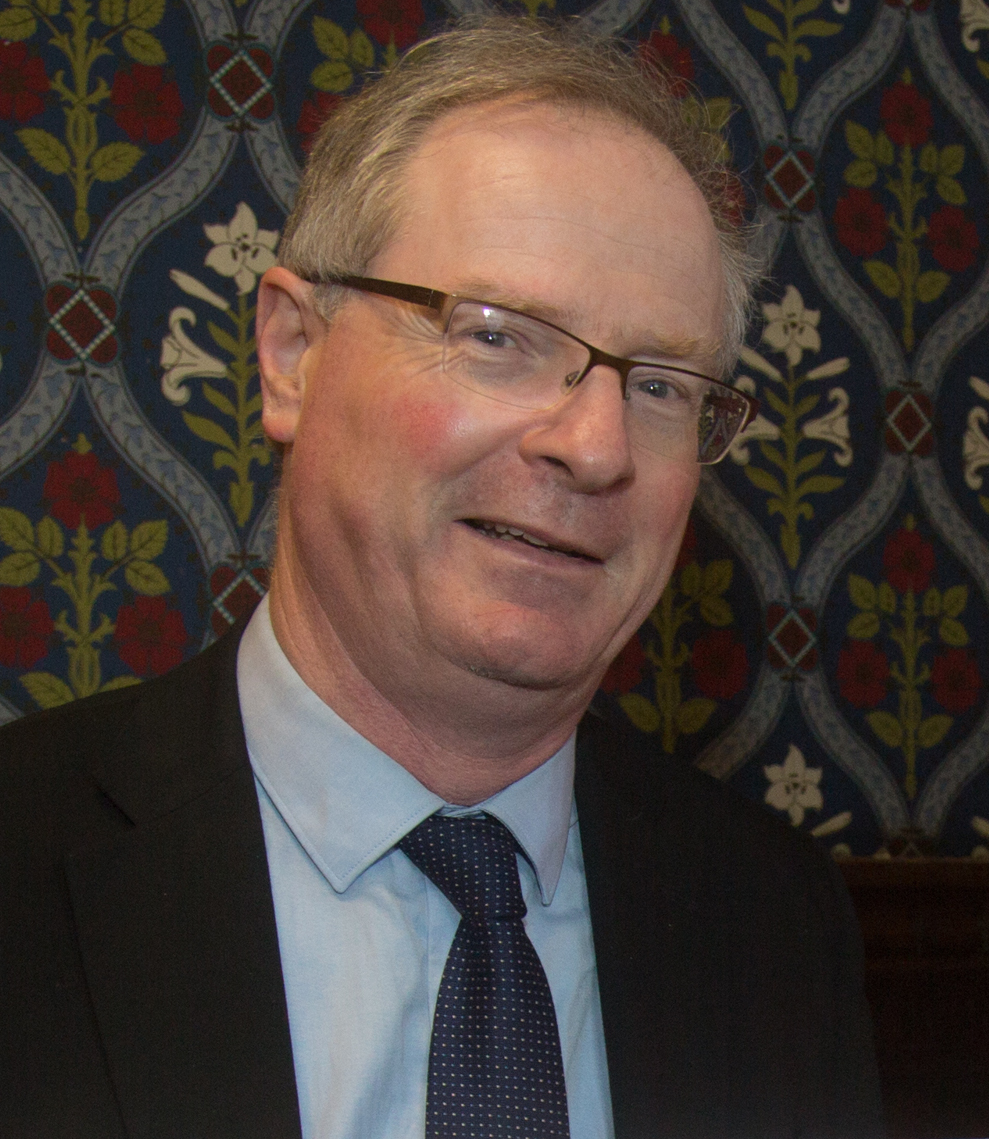
- Lefroy in 2018

Member of Newcastle-under-Lyme Borough Council for Maer and Whitmore
- Incumbent
- Assumed office 8 May 2026
- Preceded by: Amy Bryan

Member of Parliament for Stafford
- In office 6 May 2010 – 6 November 2019
- Preceded by: David Kidney
- Succeeded by: Theodora Clarke

Personal details
- Born: 30 May 1959 (age 67) London
- Party: Conservative
- Spouse: Janet Lefroy (m. 1985)
- Children: 2
- Education: King's College, Cambridge
- Website: jeremylefroy.org.uk

Jeremy John Elton Lefroy (born 30 May 1959) is a British Conservative Party politician. He was first elected as the Member of Parliament for the Stafford constituency in the 2010 general election and was re-elected in 2015 and 2017 before standing down ahead of the 2019 general election.

He was elected as a Newcastle-under-Lyme Borough Councillor in May 2026.

== Early life and education ==
Lefroy was born on 30 May 1959 in London, England. He was educated at Highgate School, an independent school in Highgate in North London. He studied at King's College, Cambridge, graduating with a Bachelor of Arts (BA) degree in 1980: as per tradition, his BA was promoted to a Master of Arts (MA Cantab) degree in 1984.

== Business career ==
Lefroy lived and worked in the coffee industry in Tanzania between 1989 and 2000. He is a qualified chartered accountant.

He also founded and runs Equity for Africa, a charitable trust which seeks to alleviate poverty in a self-sustaining way by creating jobs through investing in small and medium-sized enterprises (SMEs) in Africa.

== Political career ==
Lefroy was one of the three Conservative Councillors for the Westlands ward of Newcastle-under-Lyme Council. Since a Conservative-led joint administration with the Liberal Democrats took control from Labour in May 2006, he served as the Portfolio holder for Finance and Efficiency in the Borough.

Lefroy was the official Conservative Party candidate for Newcastle-under-Lyme at the 2005 general election, losing to the sitting Labour MP, Paul Farrelly. He polled 9,945 votes, which is a decrease from the 10,664 votes that the Conservatives recorded at the previous general election; representing a fall in the Conservative share of the vote from 26.7% to 25%, although this did also represent a 2.7% swing from Labour to the Conservatives, as Labour lost vote share at an even faster rate.

=== Parliamentary career ===
Lefroy was first elected as MP for Stafford in 2010 with a majority of 5,460 and was re-elected in the 2015 general election with an increased majority of 9,177 votes. He stepped down at the 2019 general election, having announced in June 2019 that he would not seek re-election.

In Parliament, he served on the Select Committee for International Development. In 2013, Lefroy was elected chair of The Parliamentary Network on the World Bank & International Monetary Fund. He is a member of the 1922 Executive Committee.

Lefroy has described himself as a "One Nation Tory". He advocated a "Remain" vote for the 2016 EU referendum.

=== Post-Parliamentary career ===
Lefroy was elected as a councillor for the Maer and Whitmore ward in the 2026 Newcastle-under-Lyme Borough Council election.

== Personal life ==
Lefroy has been married to Janet, a GP and professor at Keele University Medical School, since 1985. The couple have two children, who both went to school in Newcastle-under-Lyme. He lives in Newcastle-under-Lyme.

He is a member of the Conservative Christian Fellowship.

Parliament of the United Kingdom
Preceded by David Kidney	Member of Parliament for Stafford; 2010 – 2019	Succeeded by Theodora Clarke
