= River Waldron =

River in Cheshire, England

The River Waldron is a small river in Staffordshire and Cheshire in north west England. It drains water from the area between Audley and Crewe, and joins the River Weaver to the west of Crewe (grid reference SJ664560). It is known by several different names along its length, including Alsager Brook and Valley Brook. Its principal tributaries are Wistaston Brook and Barthomley Brook.

It rises in Parrot's Drumble on the outskirts of Talke, and flows roughly westwards through Alsager and Crewe.
