= Talke Pits =

Village in Staffordshire, England

Coordinates: 53.0669°N 2.2581°W

- Location within Staffordshire
- OS grid reference: SJ828522
- District: Newcastle-under-Lyme
- Shire county: Staffordshire
- Region: West Midlands
- Country: England
- Sovereign state: United Kingdom
- Post town: STOKE-ON-TRENT
- Postcode district: ST7
- Dialling code: 01782
- Police: Staffordshire
- Fire: Staffordshire
- Ambulance: West Midlands
- UK Parliament: Stoke-on-Trent North

Talke Pits is a former mining village in the Borough of Newcastle-under-Lyme, Staffordshire, England, close to the Cheshire border and the village of Talke. Population details taken at the 2011 census can be found under Kidsgrove.

The nature reserve Parrot's Drumble is near to the village.
