= Jonathan Gullis =

British politician (born 1990)

Cllr Jonathan Gullis
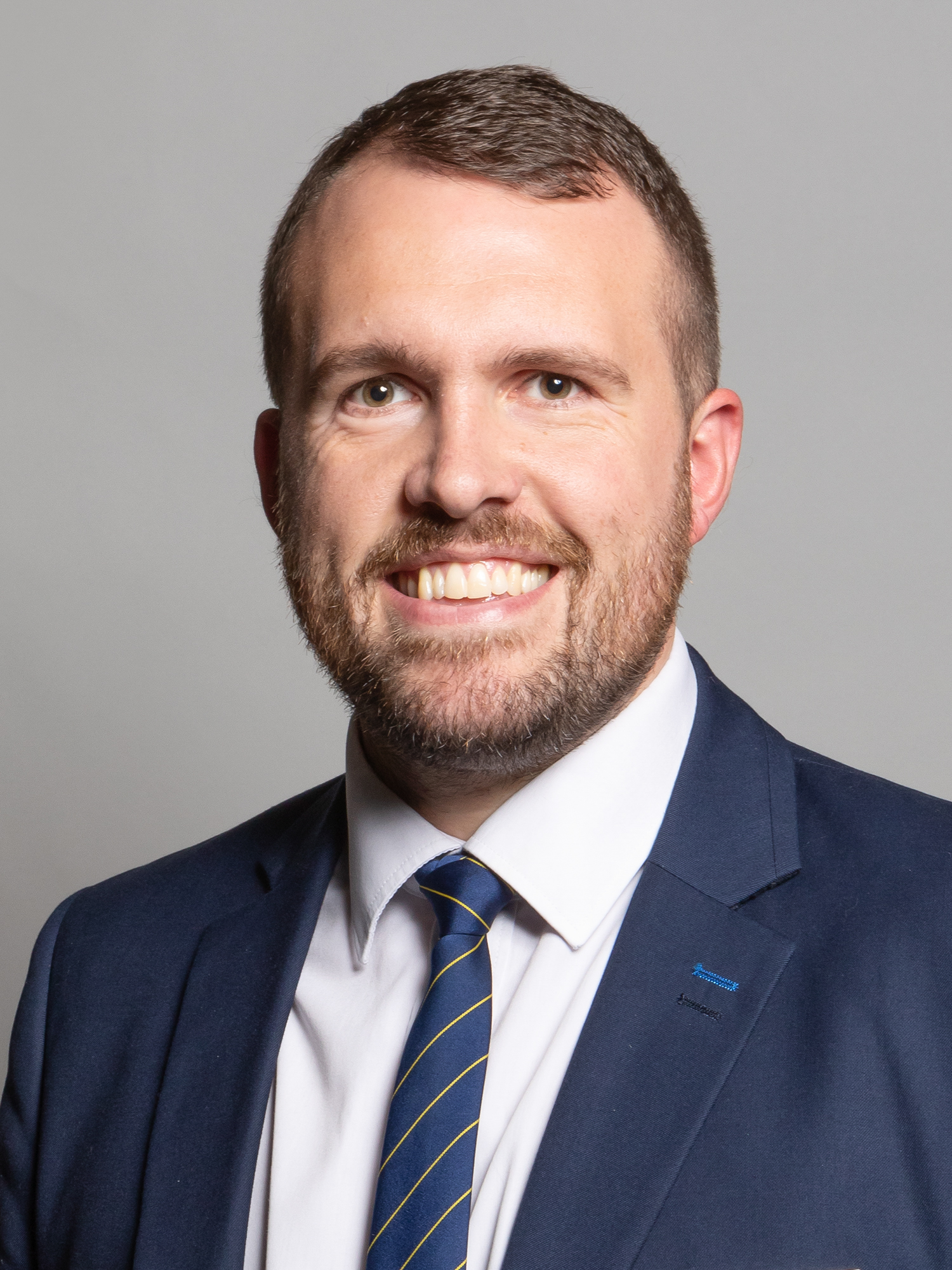
- Official portrait, 2020

Leader of Newcastle-under-Lyme Council
- Incumbent
- Assumed office 20 May 2026
- Deputy: Graham Shaw
- Preceded by: Simon Tagg

Member of Newcastle-under-Lyme Council for Kidsgrove and Ravenscliffe
- Incumbent
- Assumed office 8 May 2026

Deputy Chairman of the Conservative Party
- In office 26 March 2024 – 30 May 2024
- Prime Minister: Rishi Sunak
- Preceded by: Luke Hall
- Succeeded by: Matt Vickers

Parliamentary Under-Secretary of State for School Standards
- In office 8 September 2022 – 28 October 2022
- Prime Minister: Liz Truss; Rishi Sunak
- Preceded by: Will Quince
- Succeeded by: Nick Gibb

Member of Parliament for Stoke-on-Trent North
- In office 12 December 2019 – 30 May 2024
- Preceded by: Ruth Smeeth
- Succeeded by: David Williams

Personal details
- Born: Jonathan Edward Gullis; 9 January 1990 (age 36) Salisbury, Wiltshire, England
- Party: Reform UK (since 2025)
- Other political affiliations: Conservative (until 2025)
- Spouse: Nkita Gullis (m. 2024)
- Children: 2
- Education: Oxford Brookes University (BA)

Jonathan Edward Gullis (born 9 January 1990) is a British politician and former teacher who served as the Member of Parliament (MP) for Stoke-on-Trent North from 2019 to 2024 for the Conservative Party. He was previously appointed Parliamentary Under-Secretary of State for School Standards by Liz Truss in September 2022 but was dismissed shortly after Rishi Sunak became prime minister in October 2022.

In March 2024, he was appointed deputy chairman of the Conservative Party, replacing Luke Hall who had been appointed Minister of State for Skills, Apprenticeships and Higher Education.

In May 2025, ten months after losing his seat, Gullis was appointed as Mayor of Kidsgrove for a one year term. In December 2025, he left the Conservative Party for Reform UK.

== Early life and career ==
Jonathan Gullis was born on 9 January 1990 in Salisbury. He attended Princethorpe College, an independent school near Rugby. He studied International Relations with Law at Oxford Brookes University and obtained a PGCE in secondary citizenship at the Institute of Education (now part of UCL).

Gullis worked in schools from 2012 to 2019 and compared his teaching experiences to boxing. He worked in schools including Blackfen School for Girls (2012–2015), Ashlawn School (2015–2016), Greenwood Academy (2016–2018), and Fairfax Academy (2018–2019). Gullis described his classroom personality as "a mixture of Boris Johnson and Jacob Rees-Mogg", and said that he "liked to play the character of an English gent". Gullis says that he was "nicknamed Grumpy Gullis – because I never smiled". Upon being elected to Parliament Gullis left work at Fairfax Academy, and he described the pupils he was responsible for as head of year as "probably happy to see me go".

Gullis was elected as a Conservative councillor in the Shipston ward of Stratford-upon-Avon in May 2011, until he resigned in October 2012 after starting a teaching job in London. Gullis came in for criticism, as he had resigned three hours too late for a by-election to coincide with the area's 2012 PCC election on 15 November, an error which cost in excess of £5,000 when the by-election was held two weeks later. Gullis, annoyed at his treatment by the local Conservative party, urged locals to vote for the Labour candidate, Jeff Kenner. Kenner went on to win the by-election.

== Parliamentary career ==
Gullis stood in Washington and Sunderland West at the 2017 general election, but lost to incumbent Labour MP Sharon Hodgson.

Gullis was elected as the MP for Stoke-on-Trent North at the 2019 general election, unseating Labour's Ruth Smeeth and becoming the first Conservative to represent the constituency. At the time of his election, Gullis was employed as a school teacher and head of year at Fairfax Academy in Sutton Coldfield, and served as the school's trade union representative. Gullis joined the European Research Group shortly after entering Parliament.

On 30 April 2020, Gullis was criticised by Piers Morgan after he complained of the media's 'sick obsession' with the number of deaths during the coronavirus pandemic. Gullis was responding to a tweet by radio presenter James O'Brien. Gullis described comparisons with the number of deaths in other countries as 'lazy' in a now deleted tweet. He later apologised for his 'poor choice of words'. He later closed his Twitter account, but reopened it in November 2023.

In October 2020, after voting against a Labour Party Opposition Day Motion to extend free school meals until Easter 2021, Gullis said that he would not address a "baying mob" in response to rumours of a protest during his visit to a church foodbank. He also cited COVID-19 restrictions on gatherings.

In October 2020, Gullis stated on his Facebook page that research by the National Maritime Museum into the Royal Navy's links to slavery was "leftwing ideological nonsense".

In November 2020, following an interim report on the connections between colonialism and properties now in the care of the National Trust, including links with historic slavery, Gullis was among the signatories of a letter to The Telegraph from the "Common Sense Group" of Conservative MPs. The letter accused the National Trust of being "coloured by cultural Marxist dogma, colloquially known as the 'woke' agenda".

On 23 February 2021, Gullis was prevented by the Deputy Speaker from taking part in a debate in the House of Commons from home for being inappropriately dressed. Gullis changed into a suit, and was then allowed to participate.

In May 2021, the Parliamentary Commissioner for Standards ordered Gullis to return £253.78 and apologise after breaking parliamentary rules by using "pre-paid House-provided stationery in a way that was contrary to the published rules which put the member in breach of the requirements of paragraph 16 of the code of conduct for members." Guillis confirmed this, returned the money, and apologised.

In October 2021, Gullis suggested at a fringe meeting during the Conservative Party conference that people using the term "white privilege" should be reported to the Home Office as extremists.

Gullis has praised schemes for getting disabled people into work. He said there were significant "mental health benefits and physical health benefits" when people with Down syndrome are in work – and that it also saved the state money. He cited a video he saw about an American man with Down syndrome who had worked at McDonald's "for 30 years and had a happy life".

Gullis has described Black Lives Matter as "a Marxist organisation that wants to abolish the nuclear family and defund the police".

In January 2022, Gullis defended his decision not to wear a face covering in the Commons chamber, stating that masks were not mandatory in the Commons. According to the Stoke Sentinel, Gullis was "bellowing with his mouth wide open and appearing to rock backwards and forwards" in the Commons during Prime Minister's Questions, following a statement from the Leader of the SNP group, Ian Blackford, that implied over a million people had been plunged into poverty as a result of Conservative party policy. After Gullis' behaviour in the Commons went viral, the Speaker of the House Lindsay Hoyle was interviewed by The Times where he said he wanted members to stop "screaming and shouting" in the chamber.

In May 2022, regarding Home Office deportation flights, Gullis said that his constituents were "flabbergasted that the woke, wet and wobbly lot opposite are on the side of their lefty woke warriors, who are making sure these rapists and paedophiles remain in this United Kingdom, rather than standing up for the British people and their safety."

He resigned as Parliamentary private secretary to the Secretary of State for Northern Ireland on 5 July 2022 in the aftermath of the Chris Pincher scandal and called on Boris Johnson to resign as prime minister.

Gullis endorsed Liz Truss in the July–September 2022 Conservative Party leadership election. In September 2022, Gullis was appointed as Parliamentary Under-Secretary of State for School Standards by Truss after her appointment as prime minister. At his first and only appearance at the Despatch Box on 24 October 2022, he was rebuked by the Speaker for not adopting a sufficiently ministerial tone.

Following Truss's resignation in October 2022, Gullis initially announced his support for Boris Johnson's leadership bid. Johnson, however, withdrew from the race.

On 28 October 2022, he was dismissed from his position by Truss's successor, Rishi Sunak. Gullis announced his intention to support the Government from the backbenches.

In December 2022, on BBC Radio 4's The World at One programme, Gullis defended the government's plan to offshore the processing of asylum seekers to Rwanda. In response to a letter from senior Church of England bishops which criticised the plan, Gullis said: "I don't think unelected bishops in the House of Lords should be preaching about politics."

In April 2023, Gullis started a podcast with former Special Adviser James Starkie called Inside Whitehall. The pair designed the podcast to demystify UK politics.

On 26 March 2024, Gullis and Angela Richardson were made deputy party chairs of the Conservative Party. Following this appointment, Gullis's Wikipedia page was repeatedly vandalised, including changing his surname to "Seagullis".

In April 2024 Gullis accepted a £10,000 donation from JCB; the newspaper Byline Times links this payment to Gullis's silence on JCB closing a facility entailing 200 job losses in his constituency, and contrasts it with his activity on the announcement of a facility closure by Johnson Tiles.

In the 2024 general election, Gullis lost his Stoke-on-Trent North seat to Labour candidate David Williams.

== Post-parliamentary career ==
In October 2024, Gullis told the BBC that he had been unable to find permanent employment since losing his seat in July, stating that he believed this was related to his political views.

In May 2025, Gullis announced that he was appointed as a Senior Fellow at the Centre for Social Justice. Later that month, Gullis was named as the town mayor for Kidsgrove Town Council. Gullis has also since been appointed Director at public affairs consultancy Aegean Consultants.

On 1 December 2025, Gullis defected to Reform UK. He was joined by two of his former colleagues, Lia Nici and Chris Green.

Gullis was elected as a Reform UK councillor for the Kidsgrove and Ravenscliffe ward in the 2026 Newcastle-under-Lyme Borough Council election. He was elected the leader of Reform UK's group on the council a week later.

== Personal life ==
In March 2020, as part of a mental health awareness campaign run by the Stoke Sentinel, Gullis said that he has suffered with depression, self-harm and suicidal thoughts during periods of his life.

In June 2020, in a parliamentary debate on divorce law reform, Gullis said that he has gone through a divorce and supported the "no fault" divorce proposal.

Gullis has one daughter and one son with Nkita. Gullis is deaf in one ear.

Parliament of the United Kingdom
Preceded by Ruth Smeeth	Member of Parliament for Stoke-on-Trent North; 2019–2024	Succeeded by David Williams
