= Town (Newcastle-under-Lyme ward) =

Coordinates: 53.009°N 2.229°W

Town is a ward in the Borough of Newcastle-under-Lyme, in the county of Staffordshire, England. It covers the town centre of Newcastle-under-Lyme. In 2021 it had a population of 5604.
