= Thistleberry (ward) =

Coordinates: 53.002°N 2.244°W

Thistleberry is a ward of the Borough of Newcastle-under-Lyme, located west of Newcastle town centre, in the county of Staffordshire, England. In 2021 it had a population of 5649.
