= David Kidney =

British politician

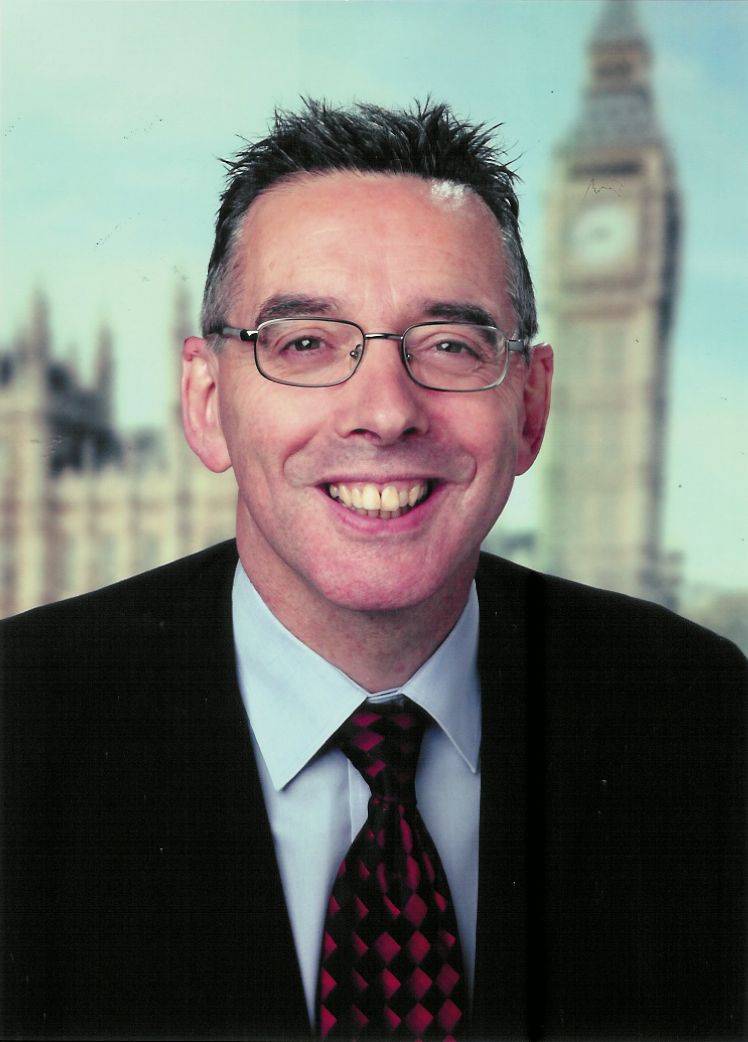

Member of Parliament for Stafford
- In office 1 May 1997 – 12 April 2010
- Preceded by: Bill Cash
- Succeeded by: Jeremy Lefroy

Personal details
- Born: 21 March 1955 (age 71) Meir, Stoke-on-Trent
- Party: Labour
- Education: University of Bristol

David Neil Kidney (born 21 March 1955) is a British Labour Party politician who was the Member of Parliament (MP) for Stafford from 1997 to 2010.

== Early life ==
Kidney attended Pinewood Primary School in Meir (now the new Crescent Primary School), Longton High School then the City of Stoke-on-Trent Sixth Form College. He studied law at the University of Bristol, receiving an LLB. Kidney was a solicitor from 1977 to 1979 in Hanley then in Stafford from 1979 to 1997, and a Stafford Borough councillor from 1987 to 1997. He was a parish councillor of Checkley from 1983 to 1987.

== Political career ==
Having fought the seat unsuccessfully in 1992, Kidney was Member of Parliament for Stafford from 1997, when he defeated Conservative candidate David Cameron, to 2010, when he lost to the Conservative candidate Jeremy Lefroy by 5,460 votes in a 7.4% swing in an election that saw Cameron become Prime Minister.

He served on the Modernisation Committee from 2001 to 2005 and was a member of the Treasury Select Committee from 1997 to 2001. He was a ministerial aide in the Environment team (for which no additional remuneration is given), but resigned in 2003 when he voted against the Iraq War. He became PPS to Elliot Morley Minister of State, Department for Environment, Food and Rural Affairs in November 2005, and in 2006 he became the PPS to the Secretary of State for Environment, Food and Rural Affairs, David Miliband. Following this, Kidney was PPS to Rosie Winterton, then Minister of State for Work and Pensions. He also served as Chair and an officer of several All-Party Groups, including Environment and Conservation & Wildlife. He recently agreed to chair a new All-Party Group formed to highlight the role of science and technology in British agriculture. Kidney also chaired the Associate Parliamentary Group for Looked after Children & Care Leavers and the "Fair Funding F40" group of the 40 lowest funded schools areas in England, campaigning for fairer funding for local schools. In the June 2009 reshuffle Kidney entered the Government as a minister for the first time, becoming Parliamentary Under Secretary of State in the Department for Energy and Climate Change, replacing Joan Ruddock.

== Later career ==
After losing his seat Kidney was employed as head of policy at the Chartered Institute of Environmental Health. He then became Chief Executive of the UK Public Health Register.

== Personal life ==
He has two children, Robert and Katy, and is divorced from Elaine. Kidney has since remarried. He supports the football team Port Vale.

== News items ==
- Caught in a forest fire in Greece in 2006
- Campaigning about prejudice against breastfeeding in 2005
- Questioning closure of RAF Stafford in 2004
- Resigning from the government in 2003

Parliament of the United Kingdom
Preceded by Bill Cash	Member of Parliament for Stafford; 1997–2010	Succeeded by Jeremy Lefroy
