= Margaret O'Flynn =

British gynaecologist (1920–2014)

Margaret O'Flynn MBBS FRCOG
- Born: Margaret Boulton; 25 January 1920; Talke of the Hill, Staffordshire, England
- Died: 22 September 2014 (aged 94)
- Other names: Margaret Foley
- Education: King's College Medical School
- Known for: Promotion of contraception services
- Medical career
- Profession: Gynaecologist

Margaret Ellen Mary O'Flynn (25 January 1920 – 22 September 2014), known professionally as Margaret Foley, was a British gynaecologist and pioneer of contraception services for women.

She dedicated most of her career to the improvement of women's health in Portsmouth and south east Hampshire, which witnessed a flourishing range of facilities and services in family planning, women's sexual health, and the management of the menopause, as a result of her determination.

== Early life ==
She was born Margaret Boulton at Talke of the Hill, Staffordshire, in January 1920, the eldest daughter of Ernest and Edith Boulton.

She became head girl at Orme Girls School and was inspired to study medicine by Miss Sprunt, her headmistress. In 1937, at the age of 17, she took her first MB and following admission to King's College Hospital Medical School, began her second MB, which she later completed in Glasgow after the students were evacuated to there for their own safety during the Second World War. She qualified in 1942. Her father, who had fought as a grenadier in the First World War, encouraged her to contribute to the war effort at the North Staffordshire Royal Infirmary during the summer holidays.

== Marriage ==
She met her future husband, John Foley, at a friend's house and they married in 1949. They had four children, all delivered by caesarean section by John Peel, later Sir John Peel. O'Flynn and her husband became the first wife-and-husband fellows of the Royal College of Obstetricians and Gynaecologists. John Foley died in 1972 and on returning from her position as senior gynaecologist in Abu Dhabi in 1976, Margaret married general practitioner Garry O'Flynn, and so gained five step-children.

== Medical career ==
O'Flynn trained under numerous consultants, including a house post under Sir Clement Price Thomas and a junior gynaecology post under Sir William Gilliatt and A.C. Palmer. It was after this post that she met her lifelong mentor, John Peel, later Sir John Peel, royal gynaecologist. Peel was influential in her career, encouraging her to do the DRCOG without haste so that she could do the next step, the MRCOG, in 1949. He taught her about contraception and the practical skills of gynaecology. They remained friends until he died at the age of 101 years.

The South London Hospital for Women offered her a consultant post in 1952, after she had been there for three years. However, she had a young child by then and her husband John was now appointed consultant in obstetrics and gynaecology in Portsmouth. In Portsmouth, she had the opportunity to review the contraceptive services available there which were mostly run by small charities using substandard buildings. With the help of Malcolm Roads, she obtained funding for free oral contraceptive pills for women with four or more children. This was later extended to all women. These initial services were primarily funded by voluntary contributions with some state help. Funding soon improved and the Department of Health gave £20,000 for the construction of a specialist women's sexual health centre in the city known as the Ella Gordon Unit.

Originally, contraception for women was free only for those with four or more children. The decision, in the early 1970s, to grant UK family planning clinics the ability to prescribe single women the contraceptive pill was contentious as until then the government had felt that contraception encouraged promiscuity or "free love".

== Later life ==
Later, O'Flynn became involved in training, in particular of general practitioners, calling upon her colleagues, including Peel and Dame Josephine Barnes, as tutors. She died on 22 September 2014, at the age of 94 years. One of her grandchildren is now also a doctor, specialising in cardiology; he qualified the year she died. Her granddaughter is a midwife.
