= The King's Church of England Academy =

Location
- First Avenue; Kidsgrove; Staffordshire, ST7 1DP; England
- Coordinates: 53.0838°N 2.24511°W

Information
- Type: Academy
- Religious affiliation: Church of England
- Local authority: Staffordshire
- Trust: Three Spires Trust
- Department for Education URN: 148402 Tables
- Ofsted: Reports
- Gender: Mixed
- Age: 11 to 18
- Enrolment: 404 as of February 2016
- Website: http://www.thekings.staffs.sch.uk/

The King's Church of England Academy (formerly Clough Hall Technology School and then The King's Church of England School) is a mixed secondary school and sixth form located in Kidsgrove in the English county of Staffordshire.

Previously a community school administered by Staffordshire County Council, in January 2015 Clough Hall Technology School became a Church of England voluntary aided school and was renamed The King's Church of England School. It was then jointly administered by the Diocese of Lichfield and Staffordshire County Council. A new school building was also constructed. In April 2021 the school converted to academy status and was renamed The King's Church of England Academy. The school is now a founding member of Three Spires Trust.

The King's Church of England Academy offers GCSEs, BTECs, OCR Nationals and NVQs as programmes of study for pupils, while students in the sixth form have the option to study from a range of A-levels, further BTECs and NVQs.
