= Crackley =

Coordinates: 53.0479°N 2.2545°W

- Location within Staffordshire
- OS grid reference: SJ830500
- District: Newcastle-under-Lyme
- Shire county: Staffordshire
- Region: West Midlands
- Country: England
- Sovereign state: United Kingdom
- Post town: Newcastle
- Postcode district: ST5
- Dialling code: 01782
- Police: Staffordshire
- Fire: Staffordshire
- Ambulance: West Midlands
- UK Parliament: Newcastle-under-Lyme

Crackley is an estate in the Borough of Newcastle-under-Lyme, Staffordshire. It is a former National Coal Board estate and lies on the edge of the larger village of Chesterton. It has a crossroads which links to park house industrial estate behind it which is next to Crackley Bank fields. The bank is an unusual main road that is directly connected to Red Street.
