= The Hitmix =

- Newcastle-under-Lyme; United Kingdom
- Frequency: 107.5 MHz
- RDS: _HitMix_

Programming
- Format: Community radio

History
- First air date: November 28, 2015

Technical information
- ERP: 25 watts
- Transmitter coordinates: 53.0289°N 2.2833°W

Links
- Website: www.thehitmix.co.uk

The Hitmix is a British community radio station for Newcastle-under-Lyme, Staffordshire, covering the Borough of Newcastle-under-Lyme. It broadcasts from a home studio in the rural village of Alsagers Bank.

== History ==
The Hitmix launched as a full-time radio service in November 2015, having been awarded an Ofcom community radio licence in October 2014 over competing applicants including 6 Towns Radio and Cre8 Radio, a station operated by Staffordshire University. Prior to this, Hitmix previously operated a number of temporary broadcasts under restricted service licences to test the viability of the station.

In April 2020, the station took on local radio presenter Johnny Owen, building a home studio to allow the presenter to perform a daily show during the COVID-19 pandemic and his own recovery from cancer. In October 2020, Johnny Owen died from cancer.

In October 2020, the station continued to hire new presenters, including a number of presenters made redundant from neighbouring commercial radio station Signal 2 after it was purchased by Bauer Media and rebranded as Greatest Hits Radio.

In January 2021, Hitmix was found in breach of its Ofcom licence for failing to provide the required recordings of its output.

== Programming ==
The station's Key Commitments, set out in its licence, state that it must provide mainstream music from the 60s to the present day, along with "topics of local interest, airtime for charitable groups, interviews, studio guests, local news and national news bulletins". Much of Hitmix's programming consists of popular music shows, with some specialist programming covering various music genres broadcast primarily at weekends.

== Transmission ==
The station transmits on an FM frequency of 107.5 MHz with an ERP of 125 watts from a transmission site adjacent to its studios in the village of Alsagers Bank, Staffordshire. Coverage extends across the station's target area in the Borough of Newcastle-under-Lyme.
