= Anne Marsh-Caldwell =

English novelist

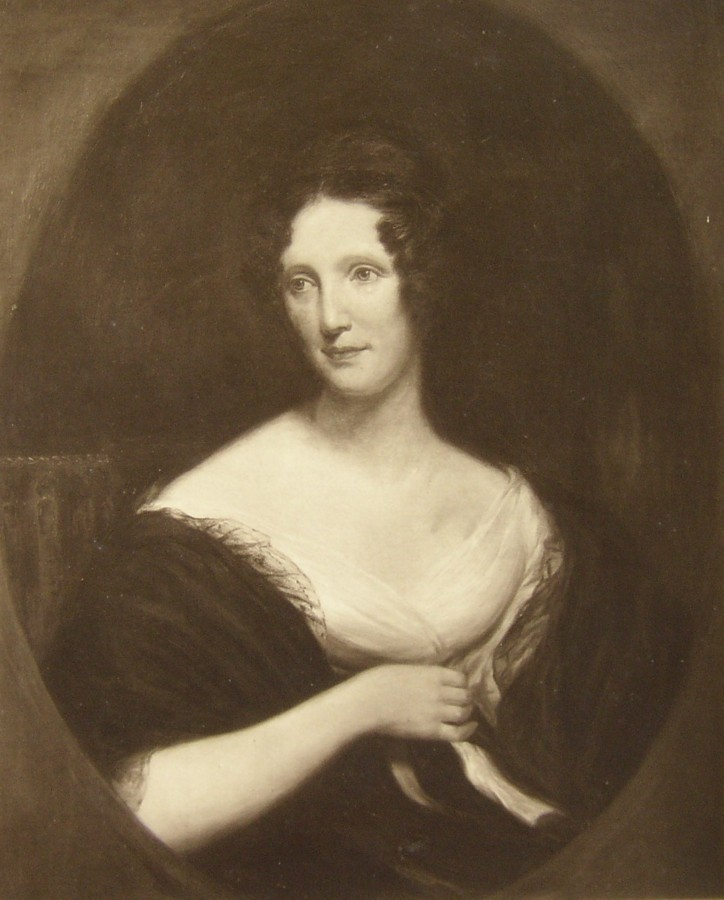
- Born: Ann Caldwell; 9 January 1791; Talke, Staffordshire
- Died: 5 October 1874 (aged 83); Newcastle-under-Lyme, Staffordshire
- Occupation: Novelist

Anne Marsh-Caldwell (née Caldwell; 9 January 1791 – 5 October 1874) was an English novelist, popular during the Victorian era. Her unmarried name was Anne Caldwell, and from 1817 when she married Arthur Cuthbert Marsh, to 1858, she was known as Anne Marsh.

== Life ==
Caldwell was the third daughter and fourth child of James Caldwell, J.P., of Linley Wood, Talke, Staffordshire, who was recorder of Newcastle-under-Lyme, and deputy-lieutenant of the county; her mother was Elizabeth, daughter and coheiress of Thomas Stamford of Derby. In July 1817 she married Arthur Cuthbert Marsh, latterly of Eastbury Lodge, Hertfordshire.

She was a long-standing friend of the family of Josiah Wedgwood, the pottery manufacturer, and an acquaintance of Charles Darwin and his wife Emma (née Wedgwood).

On the death of her brother, James Stamford Caldwell, in 1858, Anne Marsh succeeded to the estate of Linley Wood, and resumed by royal licence the surname of Caldwell in addition to that of Marsh. She died at Linley Wood, 5 October 1874.

== Works ==
Anne Marsh was one of the most popular British novelists for nearly a quarter of a century. Her first book, Two Old Men's Tales, was made up of two stories, The Deformed and The Admiral's Daughter. It was published at the suggestion of Harriet Martineau. Recognised as didactic in character, her books were published anonymously and mainly describe life in the upper middle class and the lower ranks of the aristocracy. They include the following:

- Two Old Men's Tales, 1834.
- Tales of the Woods and Fields, 1838.
- The Triumphs of Time, 1844.
- Aubrey, 1845.
- Mount Sorel, 1845.
- Father Darcy, an Historical Romance, 1846.
- Emilia Wyndham, 1846,
- Norman's Bridge, or the Modern Midas, 1847.
- Angela, or the Captain's Daughter, 1848.
- The Previsions of Lady Evelyn.
- Mordaunt Hall, 1849.
- The Wilmingtons, 1849.
- Lettice Arnold, 1850.
- Time the Avenger, 1851.
- Ravenscliffe, 1851.
- Castle Avon, 1852.
- The Heiress of Haughton, 1856.
- Evelyn Marston, 1856.
- The Rose of Ashurst, 1867.

Many of these works passed through several editions. A collection of them, in 15 volumes, was published in Thomas Hodgson's Parlour Library, 1857. Marsh wrote also The Protestant Reformation in France and the Huguenots (1847), and a translation of the Song of Roland, as chanted before the Battle of Hastings by the minstrel Taillefer (1854).

Marsh has been wrongly credited with novels written by Julia Cecilia Stretton (1812–1878), such as Margaret and her Bridesmaids.

== Family ==
Her husband Arthur Cuthbert Marsh (died 23 December 1849) was son of William Marsh, senior and sleeping partner in the London banking firm of Marsh, Stacey, & Graham; the bank was ruined in 1824 by Henry Fauntleroy, a junior partner. There were eight children of the marriage, two sons and six daughters. The sons were:

- Arthur, born 1824, died young.
- Martin William James, died 1846 in Athens at age 20.

The daughters were:

- Eliza Louisa
- Frances Mary, married 1846 to Richard Crofton of the Royal Artillery
- Georgina Amelia
- Rosamond Jane
- Mary Emma, married 1853 to Leopold George Heath R.N.
- Hannah Adelaide (died 1859), married 1853 to the Rev. Edward Henry Loring.

== Notes ==
Attribution

This article incorporates text from a publication now in the public domain: Lee, Sidney, ed. (1893). "Marsh-Caldwell, Anne". Dictionary of National Biography. Vol. 36. London: Smith, Elder & Co.
