= May Bank =

Coordinates: 53.0236°N 2.2177°W

- Location within Staffordshire
- OS grid reference: SJ854473
- District: Newcastle-under-Lyme
- Shire county: Staffordshire
- Region: West Midlands
- Country: England
- Sovereign state: United Kingdom
- Post town: Newcastle
- Postcode district: ST5
- Dialling code: 01782
- Police: Staffordshire
- Fire: Staffordshire
- Ambulance: West Midlands
- UK Parliament: Newcastle-under-Lyme

May Bank is a suburb of Newcastle-under-Lyme in Staffordshire, England.. In 2011, the district had a population of 6,236 residents.
