= Cross Heath =

Suburb of Newcastle-under-Lyme, England

Coordinates: 53.0223°N 2.2325°W

- Location within Staffordshire
- Population: 5,887 (2011 census)
- OS grid reference: SJ845472
- District: Newcastle-under-Lyme
- Shire county: Staffordshire
- Region: West Midlands
- Country: England
- Sovereign state: United Kingdom
- Post town: Newcastle
- Postcode district: ST5
- Dialling code: 01782
- Police: Staffordshire
- Fire: Staffordshire
- Ambulance: West Midlands
- UK Parliament: Newcastle-under-Lyme

Cross Heath is a suburb of Newcastle-under-Lyme that is located alongside the A34 road. It is a ward in the Borough of Newcastle-under-Lyme. According to the 2001 Census it had a population of 6,159, reducing to 5,887 at the 2011 Census.
