= Kidsgrove =

Town in Staffordshire, England

Coordinates: 53.0874°N 2.2478°W

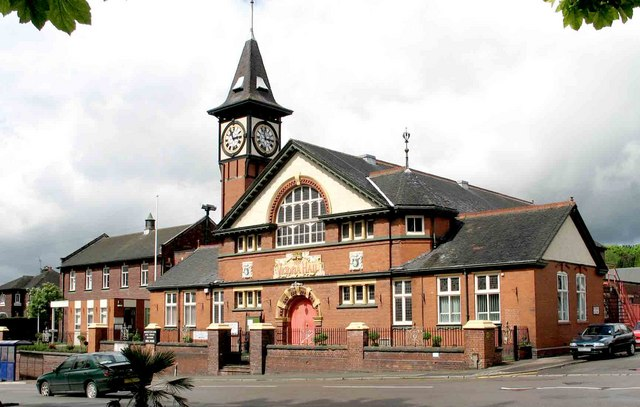
- Kidsgrove Town Hall

- Location within Staffordshire
- Population: 23,756 (2011 census)
- OS grid reference: SJ835545
- District: Borough of Newcastle-under-Lyme
- Shire county: Staffordshire
- Region: West Midlands
- Country: England
- Sovereign state: United Kingdom
- Post town: STOKE-ON-TRENT
- Postcode district: ST7
- Dialling code: 01782
- Police: Staffordshire
- Fire: Staffordshire
- Ambulance: West Midlands
- UK Parliament: Stoke-on-Trent North

Kidsgrove is a town in the borough of Newcastle-under-Lyme, Staffordshire, England, on the border with Cheshire. It is part of the Potteries Urban Area, along with Stoke-on-Trent and Newcastle-under-Lyme. It has a population of 26,276 (2019 census). Most of the town is in the Kidsgrove ward, whilst the western part is in Ravenscliffe.

== History ==
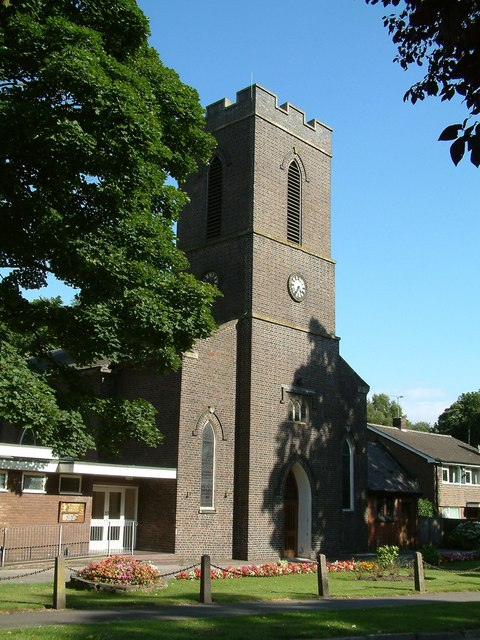
St Thomas' Parish Church

From the 18th century, Kidsgrove grew around coal mining, although the pits have now closed. Clough Hall mansion in the town is now demolished.

The engineer James Brindley cut the first Harecastle Tunnel on the Trent and Mersey Canal near the town; Thomas Telford cut the second. Kidsgrove also marks the southern extremity of the Macclesfield Canal. There is a legend regarding a headless ghost that is said to haunt the Harecastle Tunnel. The ghost is said to be that of a young woman who was murdered inside the tunnel. She is referred to as the "Kidsgrove Boggart".

Kidsgrove was made an urban district in 1904 with the abolition of the Wolstanton Rural District, including the parishes of Kidsgrove and Newchapel. Talke, previously part of the Audley Urban District, was added in 1932.

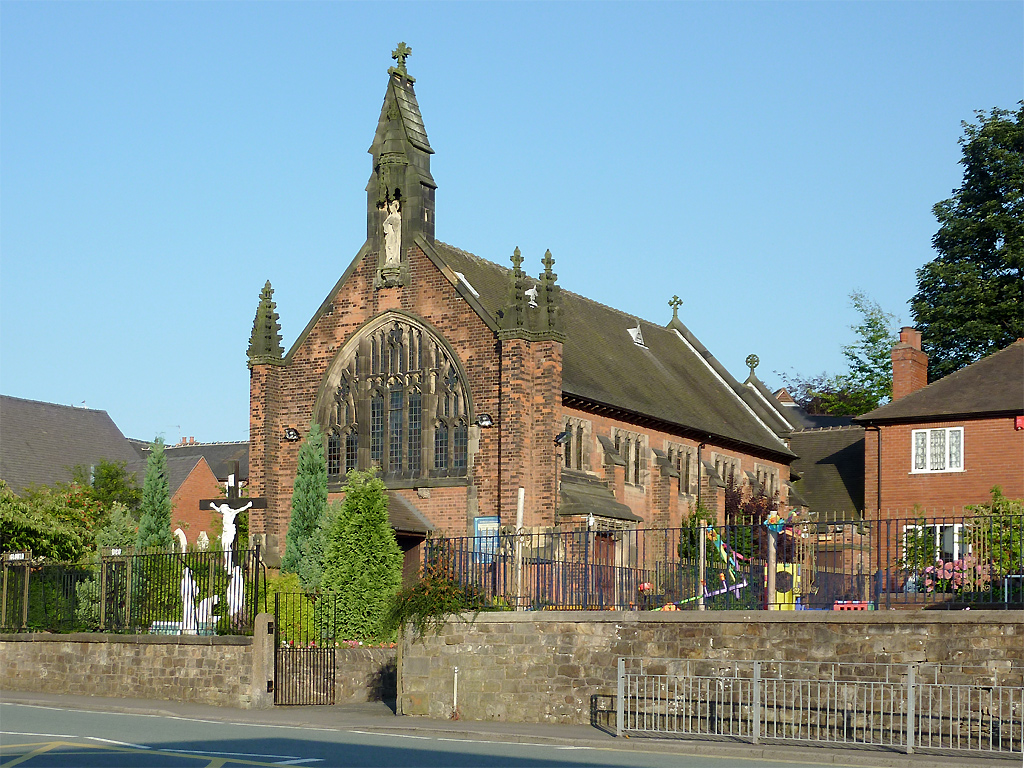
Catholic Church of St John

The town was served by three railway stations:

- Kidsgrove railway station was opened by the North Staffordshire Railway on 9 October 1848 as Harecastle, later becoming Kidsgrove Central. It continues to serve the town
- Kidsgrove Liverpool Road, on the Potteries Loop Line, between 1875 and 1964
- Market Street Halt, also on the loop line, between 1909 and 1950.

In 1975, kidnapping victim Lesley Whittle was kept in Bathpool Park, south of Kidsgrove, in an air ventilation shaft from a disused coal mine. She was kept in the shaft for several weeks, with a noose around her neck, and was hanged. Donald Neilson, the killer known as the "Black Panther," was later convicted of murdering her after repeated delays in getting the ransom.

The town used to house the English Electric site on West Avenue, Nelson Industrial Estate. Over the years, it went through various name changes: GEC, CEGELEC, Alstom and Converteam, before finally General Electric. GE closed the Kidsgrove site in 2016 and the last remaining original building has since been demolished, leaving only the recently erected warehouse which is now under use of another company.

== Governance ==
The town is situated in north-west Staffordshire and is part of the Borough of Newcastle-under-Lyme.

Kidsgrove has a town council of twenty members, separated into four wards: Talke and Butt Lane, Kidsgrove Central & Ravenscliffe, Hardings Wood, and Newchapel & Mow Cop. Kidsgrove Town Council was created in 1974, when Kidsgrove Urban District Council was abolished when the area was absorbed by Newcastle-under-Lyme Borough Council under the Local Government Act 1972.

A mayor is elected by the town council annually; this position is mainly a civic role and acts as an ambassador for Kidsgrove. The town council is based at Kidsgrove Town Hall.

Nationally, the town is represented by the Stoke-on-Trent North parliamentary constituency. As of the 2024 general election, the MP is David Williams.

== Amenities ==
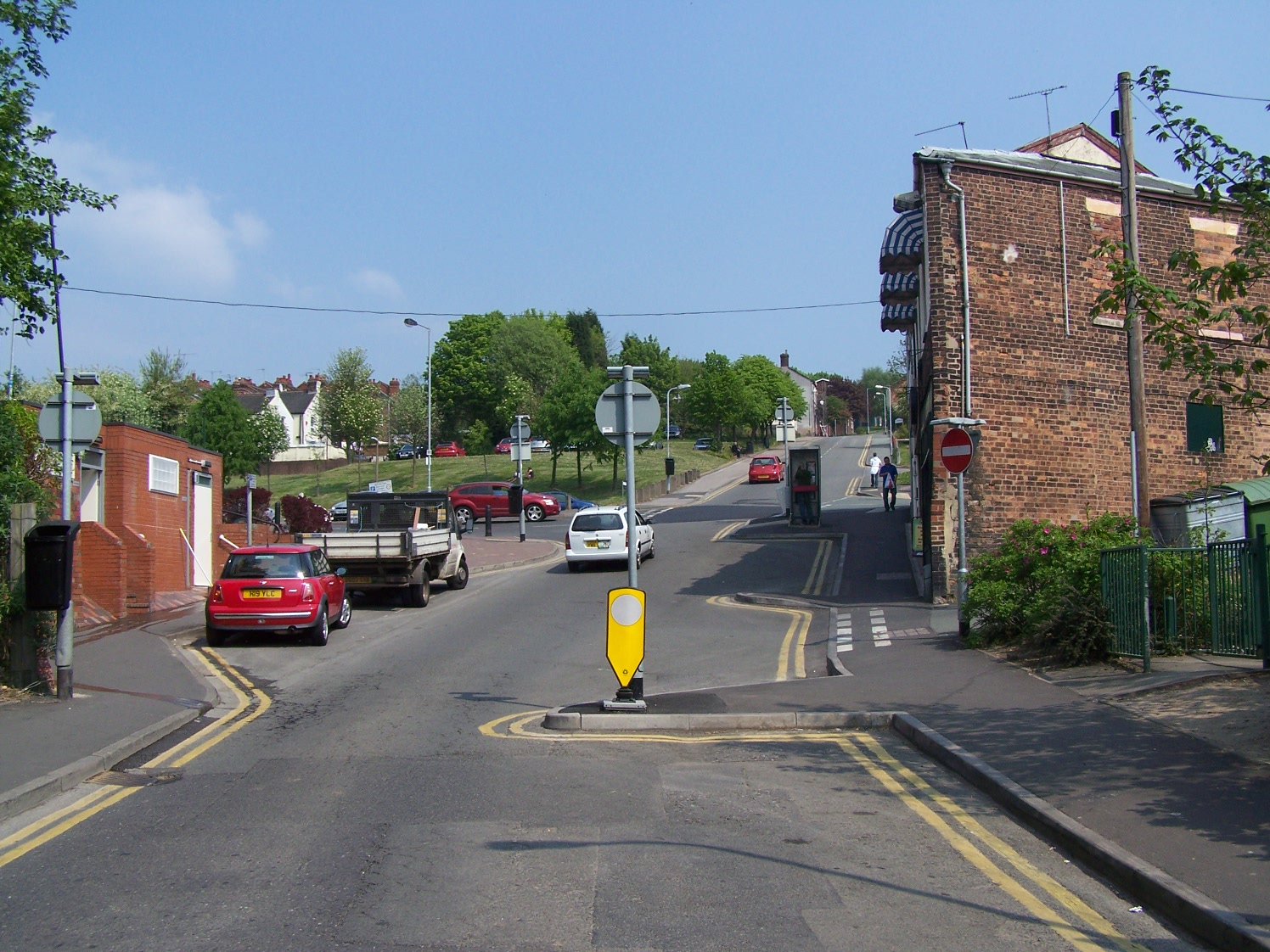
Heathcote Street

The town has a library, post office, health centre and three supermarkets. Market Street has smaller shops and many fast food restaurants.

Schools include:

- The King's Church of England Academy
- Kidsgrove Secondary School, formerly Maryhill High School
- Kidsgrove Primary School, formerly Maryhill Primary School
- St John's Catholic School.

== Transport ==
Bus services are operated by First Potteries and D&G Bus; routes connect the town with Alsager, Biddulph, Congleton, Crewe and Hanley.

Kidsgrove railway station lies on a junction of the Crewe-Derby Line and a spur of the West Coast Main Line. The station is served by three train operating companies:

- East Midlands Railway operates services connect the town with Crewe, Derby, Nottingham and Lincoln Central
- London Northwestern Railway runs services between Crewe and Stafford
- Northern Trains operates the route between Manchester Piccadilly and Stoke-on-Trent.

The Trent and Mersey Canal runs through the town.

The A50 bisects the town from north-west to south-east; the A34 and A500 run close by.

== Media ==
Since the town is close to the Cheshire-Staffordshire border, local news and television programmes are provided by BBC North West and ITV Granada that broadcast from Salford taking television signals being received from the Winter Hill TV transmitter.

Local radio stations are BBC Radio Stoke, Hits Radio Staffordshire & Cheshire, Greatest Hits Radio Staffordshire & Cheshire, 6 Towns Radio and HitMix Radio, a community based radio station.

The Sentinel is the town's local newspaper.

== Community ==
=== Rotary club ===
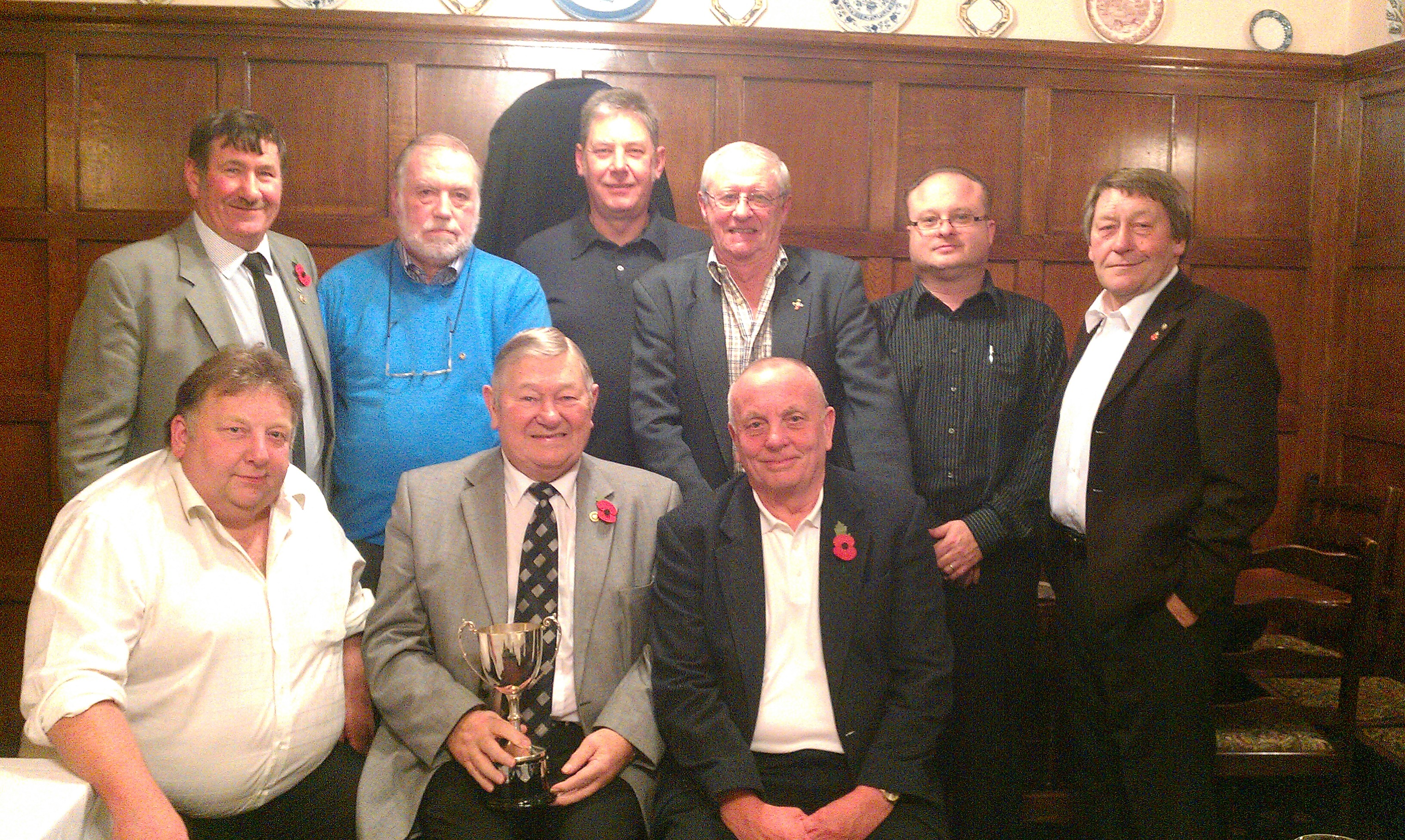
Kidsgrove Rotary with their second trophy of the year for winning the Rotary 1210 District darts competition in 2011

Founded on 15 January 1969 and presented with its charter on 2 July of the same year, the Rotary Club of Kidsgrove (RCK) has been active within the community whether fundraising, volunteering or helping out local projects for over 50 years. The club is also part of District 1210 within Rotary International in Britain and Ireland.

Originally meeting in the Masonic Hall and Institute in the town, the group now meets at the Red Bull, in Church Lawton. Every November, RCK hold a bonfire night and fireworks at Clough Hall Park; during December, they can be seen on the streets of Kidsgrove with their Santa float, collecting for local good causes.

In April 2012, RCK were also announced as the Rotary International in Britain and Ireland winners of the Club Online Presence Award. This was the first time the award has been presented; it recognises the achievements the group have made through their website and a variety of social media avenues in the year.

=== Scouts ===
The town is home to the 1st Kidsgrove Scout Group, in the district of Potteries North, and were established in 1910. The group has undertaken regular tours to the DCA World Championships in the US.

== Sport ==
Kidsgrove Athletic F.C. play in the Northern Premier League Division One West.

Kidsgrove has a rugby club and a cricket club.

== Notable people ==
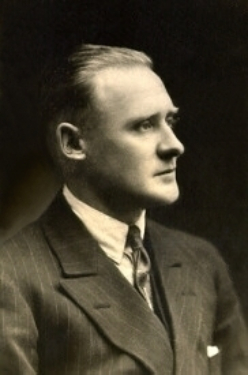
R.J. Mitchell

- R.J. Mitchell (1895–1937), designer of the RAF's Battle of Britain fighter, the Spitfire, was born in Butt Lane village
- Brewster Mason (1922–1987), Royal Shakespeare Company actor, also appeared in films and on television
- Duncan Robinson (1943–2022), British art historian and academic
- John Waite (born 1951), presenter on British radio (usually BBC Radio 4) since 1973.

=== Sport ===
- Frank Bentley (1886–1958), footballer born in Butt Lane village, Kidsgrove.
- Percy Brooke (1893–1971), footballer who played mainly for Aberdare Athletic
- Sam Johnson (1901–1975), footballer who played for York City F.C. and Stoke City F.C.
- Stan Smith (1931–2010), footballer. He spent 1950 to 1957 with Port Vale F.C.
- Ken Higgs (1937–2016), England Test cricketer.
- Mark Bright (born 1962), footballer and pundit, attended Maryhill High School.

== See also ==
- Listed buildings in Kidsgrove
