= Ravenscliffe (ward) =

Coordinates: 53.079°N 2.237°W

- Location within Staffordshire
- Population: 4,007 (2001 census)
- Civil parish: Kidsgrove
- District: Newcastle-under-Lyme
- Shire county: Staffordshire
- Region: West Midlands
- Country: England
- Sovereign state: United Kingdom
- Police: Staffordshire
- Fire: Staffordshire
- Ambulance: West Midlands

Ravenscliffe is an area of Kidsgrove, in the Newcastle-under-Lyme district, in Staffordshire, England, lying south of the town centre and west of Sandyford.

The name Ravenscliffe was used for a ward in the Borough of Newcastle-under-Lyme, which covered part of Kidsgrove along with the area of Acres Nook; in 2011 the ward had a population of 4007. As of 2023, the area is part of Kidsgrove & Ravenscliffe ward.
