= David Williams (Stoke-on-Trent North MP) =

British politician

Cllr David Williams MP
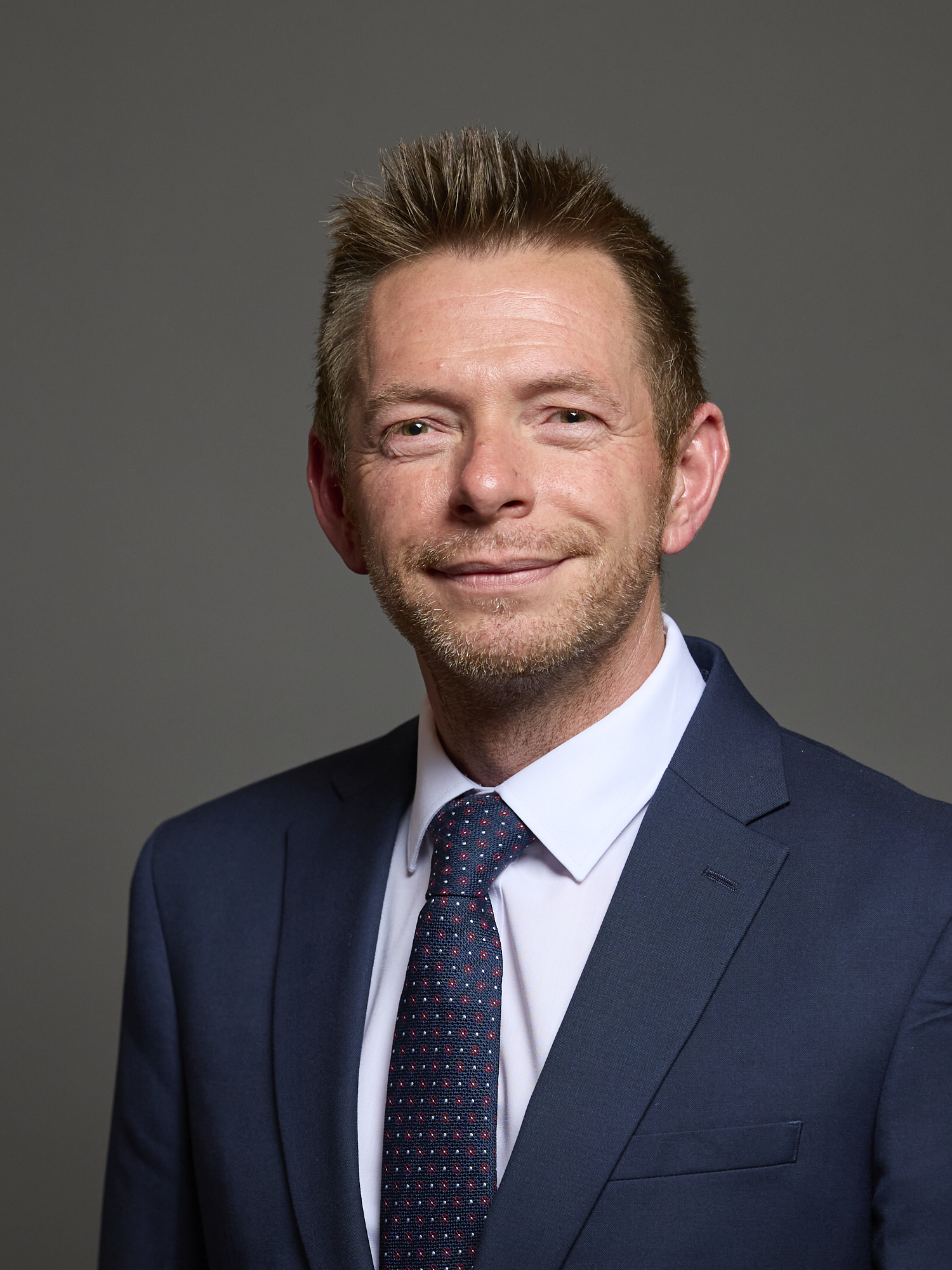
- Official portrait, 2024

Member of Parliament for Stoke-on-Trent North
- Incumbent
- Assumed office 4 July 2024
- Preceded by: Jonathan Gullis
- Majority: 5,082 (14.1%)

Member of Stoke-on-Trent City Council for Little Chell and Stanfield
- Incumbent
- Assumed office 2 May 2019
- Preceded by: David Conway

Personal details
- Party: Labour
- Education: University of Keele

David Williams is a British Labour Party politician serving as Member of Parliament for Stoke-on-Trent North since 2024.

Williams studied at the University of Keele. He was elected to Stoke-on-Trent City Council in 2019, representing Little Chell and Stanfield ward, a role which he continues to undertake whilst serving as a full-time Member of Parliament.

== Political career ==
Under Jeremy Corbyn's leadership of the Labour Party, Williams stood unsuccessfully in the Stafford constituency in the 2017 general election.

Williams was elected as the Member of Parliament for Stoke-on-Trent North on 4 July 2024.

Parliament of the United Kingdom
| Preceded by Jonathan Gullis | Member of Parliament for Stoke-on-Trent North; 2024–present | Incumbent |
