= Parrot's Drumble =

Nature reserve in Staffordshire, England

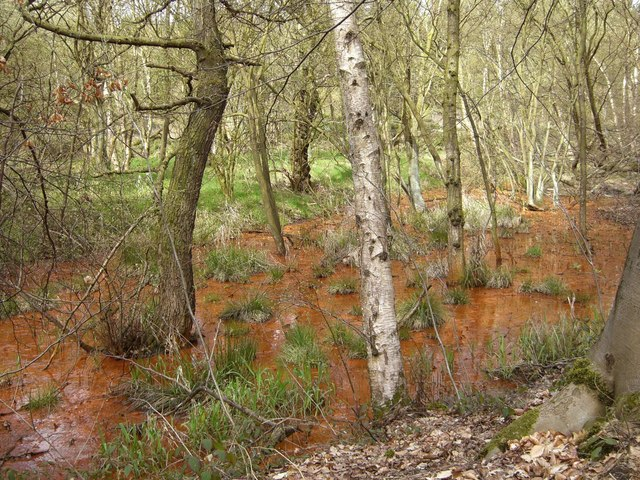
- The stream coloured by iron oxide from old mineworkings

- Location within Staffordshire
- Location: Talke Pits, Staffordshire
- OS grid: SJ 818 522
- Coordinates: 53°4′0″N 2°16′23″W
- Area: 12 hectares (30 acres)
- Operator: Staffordshire Wildlife Trust
- Website: www.staffs-wildlife.org.uk/nature-reserves/parrots-drumble

Parrot's Drumble is a nature reserve of the Staffordshire Wildlife Trust. It is an area of woodland next to the village of Talke Pits, and about 4 miles (6.4 km) north of Newcastle-under-Lyme, in Staffordshire, England.

== Description ==
Its area is 12 hectares (30 acres). It is an ancient woodland, the area having been woodland for more than 400 years. It was once owned by a family named Parrot, and a "drumble" is a local word for a stream running through a wooded valley.

There are old mineworkings in the area, from which iron oxide leaches, giving the stream a reddish colour.

There is a walking trail through the wood, where there is oak, hazel, birch, rowan and ash; near the stream there is willow and alder. Woodland plants include dog's mercury, yellow archangel and wood-sorrel, and in the spring there are notable displays of bluebells. Birds to be seen include great spotted woodpecker, lesser spotted woodpecker, nuthatch and treecreeper.

Parrot's Drumble is the source of the River Waldron which flows through Staffordshire and Cheshire until it meets the River Weaver near Nantwich.
