= Butt Lane =

Village in Staffordshire, England

Coordinates: 53.086598°N 2.25875°W

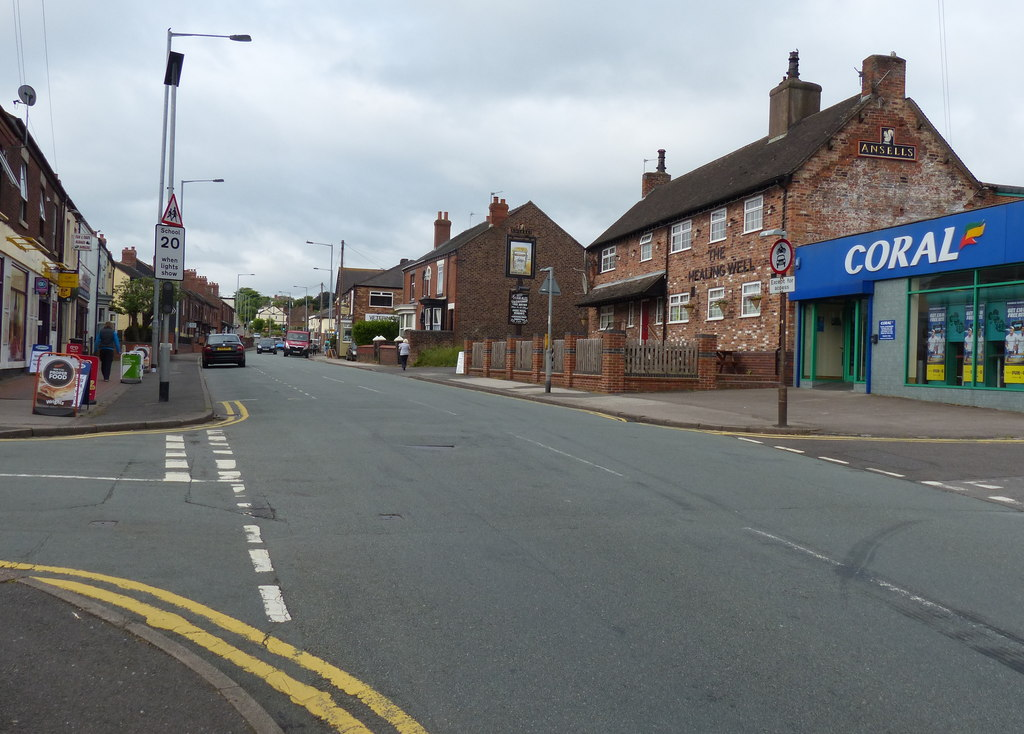
- Congleton Road, the main street of Butt Lane

- Location within Staffordshire
- OS grid reference: SJ827544
- Civil parish: Kidsgrove
- District: Borough of Newcastle-under-Lyme
- Shire county: Staffordshire
- Region: West Midlands
- Country: England
- Sovereign state: United Kingdom
- Post town: STOKE-ON-TRENT
- Postcode district: ST7
- Dialling code: 01782
- Police: Staffordshire
- Fire: Staffordshire
- Ambulance: West Midlands
- UK Parliament: Stoke-on-Trent North

Butt Lane is a village in the civil parish of Kidsgrove, in the Borough of Newcastle-under-Lyme, in the county of Staffordshire, England. The village borders on Church Lawton in Cheshire. A ward of the borough is named after it. It is also close to the towns of Alsager and Kidsgrove.

== Amenities ==
Butt Lane is mostly a residential area with the neighbouring village of Talke having most of the amenities for the local residents. As well as Kidsgrove, which is a short distance to the east.

== Transport ==
The village has regular bus services to Kidsgrove, Crewe, Biddulph, Congleton, Stoke-on-Trent. Alsager and Newcastle-under-Lyme.

The nearest rail station is Kidsgrove.

== Notable people ==
- Reginald Mitchell CBE, FRAeS, (1895 in Congleton Road, Butt Lane – 1937 in Southampton) was the designer of the well-known World War II fighter aeroplane Spitfire, used by the Royal Air Force and their allies.
- Ada Nield Chew (1870 at White Hall Farm, Butt Lane – 1945 in Burnley) was a British suffragist.
