= 6 Towns Radio =

- Tunstall; England
- Broadcast area: Stoke-on-Trent, Stone, Newcastle-under-Lyme and Kidsgrove
- Frequency: DAB: 8A (Stoke-Newcastle)

Programming
- Format: Community radio

Ownership
- Owner: Potteries Media CIC

History
- First air date: 8 September 2010

Links
- Website: 6towns.co.uk

6 Towns Radio is a community radio station covering Stoke-on-Trent, Newcastle and Kidsgrove in the United Kingdom. The aim of the station is to appeal to a wide demographic, covering musical styles including House, Northern Soul and Rock. It has its own studio, which is based in Tunstall, one of the six towns of Stoke-on-Trent.

== History ==
6 Towns Radio launched on 8 September 2010. Throughout its history, it has been funded by advertising, donations, sponsorship and events. In 2012, the station joined with Cre8 FM from Staffordshire University, to provide a joint restricted service licence (RSL) broadcast. As this went well, 6 Towns Radio had its own RSL in January 2014.

Over the years, members of 6 Towns Radio have interviewed many famous names, as well as many local names, including Keith Lemon, Welsh Rugby player Gareth Evans, The 1975 and Gordon Hill, the Wealdstone Raider.

In early 2016, 6 Towns Radio had a major rebrand. The station became known as 6TR, but still retains the name 6 Towns Radio.

== 6 Towns Radio currently ==
6 Towns Radio currently has around 80 volunteers who donate their time to present shows and help out. It has a range of programmes designed to appeal to a wide audience, with musical genres including Jazz, Pop, Rock and Local unsigned music.

The station is very active in the local community and hosts many events each year.

== Ofcom licence application ==
In 2014, 6 Towns Radio applied for a community radio licence from Ofcom to broadcast on FM permanently. The station’s planned transmitter site was at Burslem Cricket Club, and it proposed a mix of music and talk with a local angle. However, 6 Towns' license application, and other local stations were turned down. No station in Stoke-on-Trent was awarded a licence due to frequency allocations. The Hitmix, based in Newcastle-under-Lyme, won a licence.

In late 2023, 6 Towns Radio had their Ofcom licence accepted and began to broadcast across DAB to Stoke-on-Trent and Newcastle-under-Lyme.
