= Knutton =

Coordinates: 53.0183°N 2.2472°W

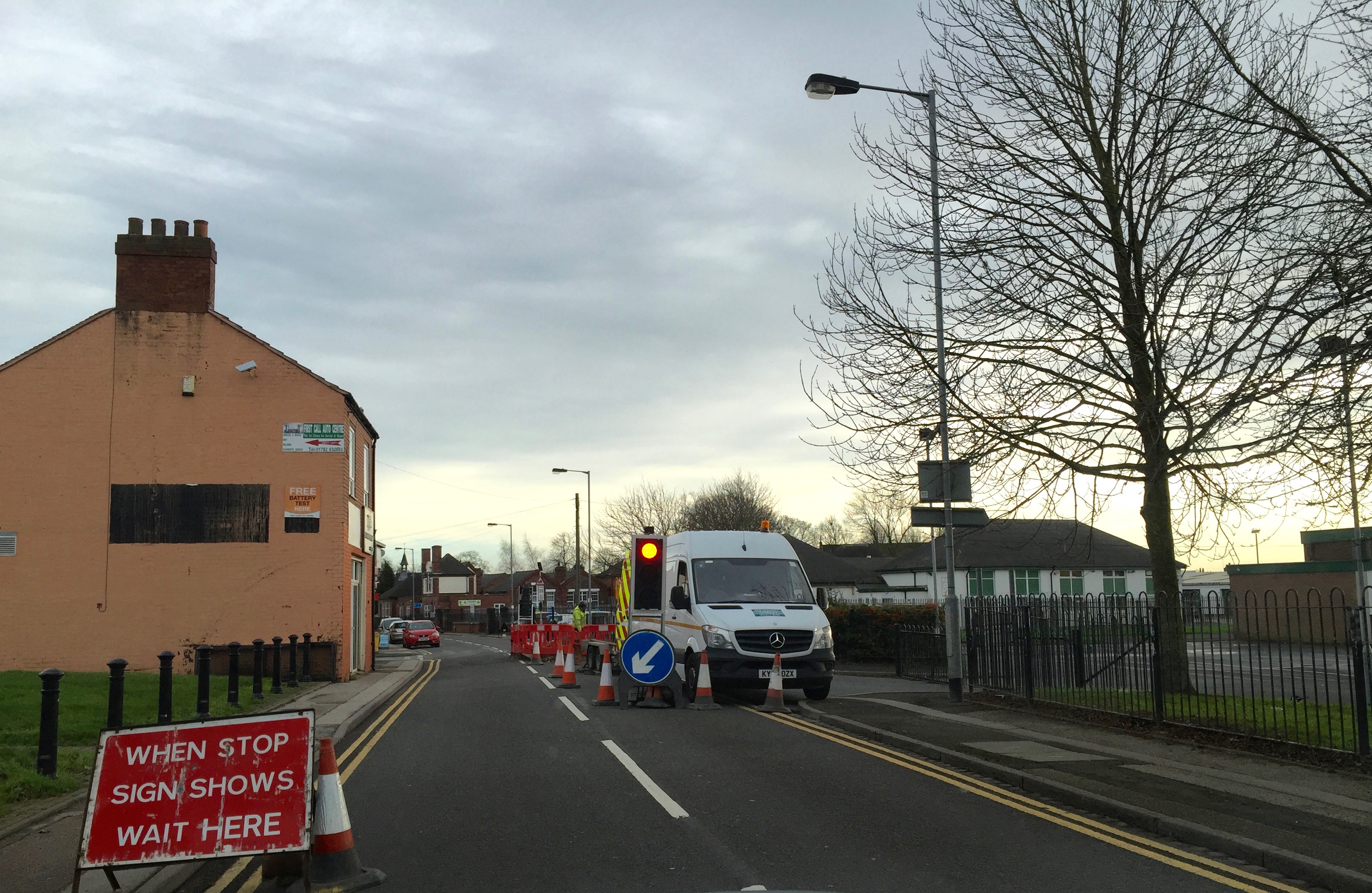
- High Street, Knutton

- Location within Staffordshire
- OS grid reference: SJ835468
- District: Newcastle-under-Lyme
- Shire county: Staffordshire
- Region: West Midlands
- Country: England
- Sovereign state: United Kingdom
- Post town: NEWCASTLE
- Postcode district: ST5
- Dialling code: 01782
- Police: Staffordshire
- Fire: Staffordshire
- Ambulance: West Midlands
- UK Parliament: Newcastle-under-Lyme

Knutton is a village in the Borough of Newcastle-under-Lyme, Staffordshire, England. It lies between the town of Newcastle-under-Lyme, and the village of Silverdale.
