= Talke =

Village in Staffordshire, England

Coordinates: 53.077°N 2.263°W

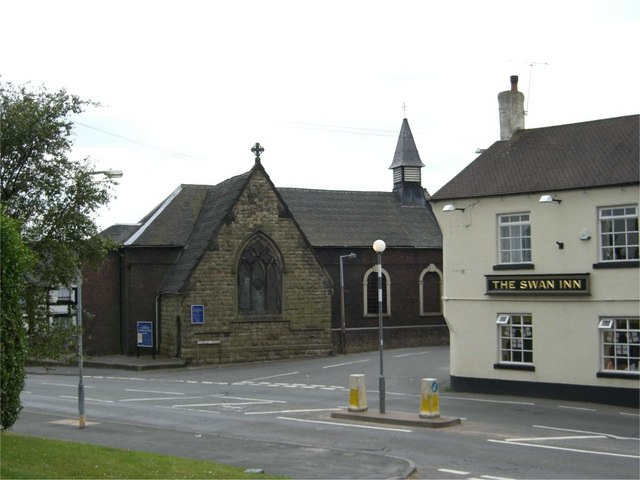

- Location within Staffordshire
- OS grid reference: SJ824533
- Civil parish: Kidsgrove
- District: Newcastle-under-Lyme
- Shire county: Staffordshire
- Region: West Midlands
- Country: England
- Sovereign state: United Kingdom
- Post town: STOKE-ON-TRENT
- Postcode district: ST7
- Dialling code: 01782
- Police: Staffordshire
- Fire: Staffordshire
- Ambulance: West Midlands
- UK Parliament: Stoke-on-Trent North

Talke is a village in the civil parish of Kidsgrove, in the Newcastle-under-Lyme district, in Staffordshire, England. It is 4 miles (6.4 km) northwest of Newcastle-under-Lyme and 1.5 miles (2.4 km) southwest of Kidsgrove.

== Etymology ==
Its unusual name is derived from the even more unusual "Talk o' th' Hill" which means 'bush on top of the hill'. Talke is mentioned in the Domesday Book as Talc in 1086.

== History ==
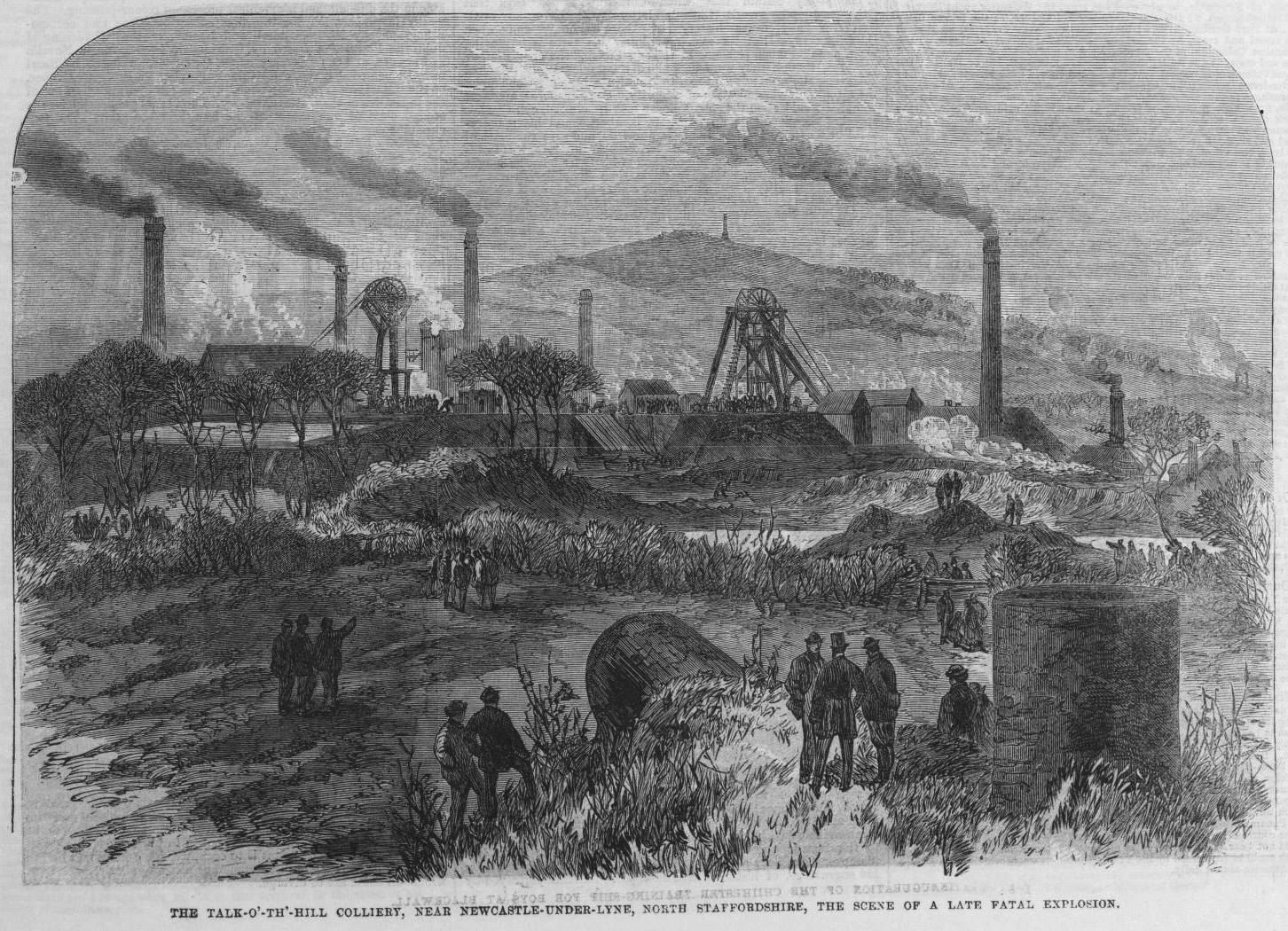
The Talk-o'-th'-Hill Colliery, the scene of a fatal explosion on 13 December 1866; where 91 miners were killed.

Talke was made a civil parish on 1932 from the parish of Audley, being transferred from the disbanded Audley Urban District to Kidsgrove Urban District. on 1 April 1974 it was absorbed and became part of the parish of Kidsgrove in the borough of Newcastle-under-Lyme.

In 1951 the parish had a population of 6099.

Talke and Talke Pits were formerly mining sites, which is why there are road names such as Coal Pit Hill.

== Borders ==
Talke borders on Talke Pits, Kidsgrove and Butt Lane. It is on the border of Staffordshire and Cheshire. The ancient bluebell wood at Parrot's Drumble is nearby.

== Notable people ==
- Thomas Alcock (1789-1870), Early Primitive Methodist preacher, his name appeared on the first handwritten plan of the Tunstall Circuit in 1810. He is number 12 on the first printed plan. Thomas’ brother William also appeared on the first plan. In 1818, William Alcock was No. 6 on the Tunstall circuit plan.
- Enoch Edwards (1852 in Talk-o'-the Hill – 1912) was a British trade unionist and politician, a Lib-Lab MP for Hanley in 1906, then a Labour Party MP in 1909.
- Frederick Heath-Caldwell (1858–1945), British Army officer and RAF general, inherited the Linley Wood estate near the village
- Reginald Mitchell (1895–1937), the creator of the Spitfire aeroplane, was a native of local village, Butt Lane.
- Ada Nield Chew (1870 – 1945) Suffragist and labour organiser.
- Margaret O'Flynn (1920–2014), gynaecologist and pioneer of contraception services for women.
