= Borough of Newcastle-under-Lyme =

Coordinates: 53.011°N 2.229°W

Newcastle-under-Lyme
- Non-metropolitan district and borough
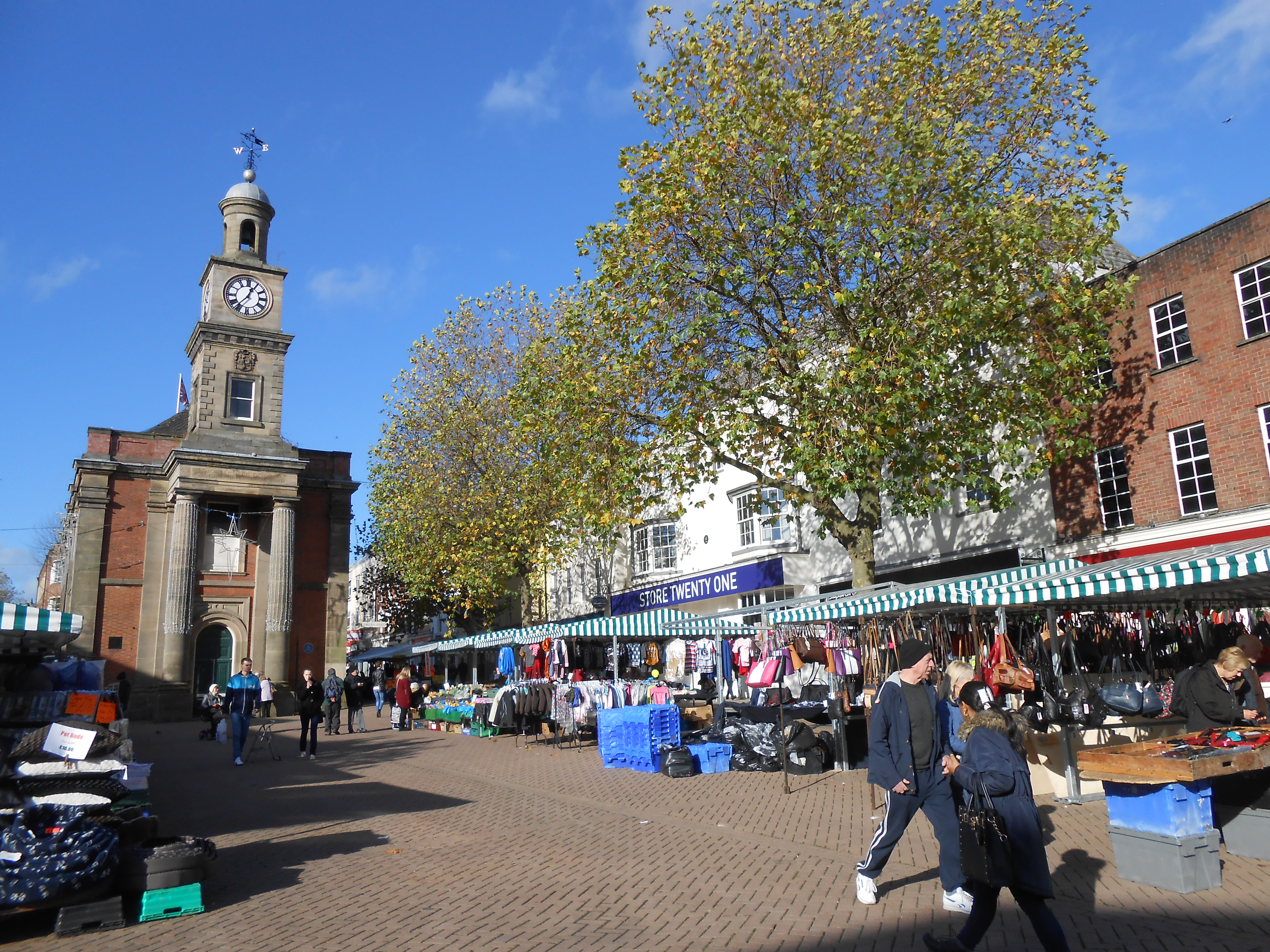
- Newcastle-under-Lyme market day and high street

- Newcastle-under-Lyme shown within Staffordshire
- Region: West Midlands
- Non-metropolitan county: Staffordshire
- Status: Non-metropolitan district
- Admin HQ: Newcastle-under-Lyme
- Incorporated: 1 April 1974

Government
  - Type: Non-metropolitan district council
  - Body: Newcastle-under-Lyme Borough Council
  - MPs: Adam Jogee (Labour); Karen Bradley (Conservative); Gavin Williamson (Conservative)

Area
  - Total: 81.5 sq mi (211.0 km^{2})
  - Rank: 142nd (of 296)

Population (2025)
  - Total: 128,093
  - Rank: 192nd (of 296)
  - Density: 1,572/sq mi (607.1/km^{2})

Ethnicity (2021)
  - Ethnic groups: List: 92.9% White; 3.8% Asian; 1.6% Mixed; 1% Black; 0.7% other

Religion (2021)
  - Religion: List: 51.8% Christianity; 38.9% no religion; 1.8% Islam; 0.6% Hinduism; 0.1% Judaism; 0.2% Sikhism; 0.4% Buddhism; 0.4% other; 5.8% not stated
- Time zone: UTC0 (GMT)
  - Summer (DST): UTC+1 (BST)
- ONS code: 41UE (ONS); E07000195 (GSS)
- OS grid reference: SJ8463746024

The Borough of Newcastle-under-Lyme is a local government district with borough status in Staffordshire, England.

It is named after the town of Newcastle-under-Lyme, where the council is based. The borough also includes the town of Kidsgrove and several villages and surrounding rural areas lying generally to the west of Newcastle itself. Most of the borough's built-up areas form part of The Potteries Urban Area.

The neighbouring districts are Staffordshire Moorlands, Stoke-on-Trent, Stafford, Shropshire and Cheshire East.

== History ==
The town of Newcastle-under-Lyme was an ancient borough, established in the 12th century. It is known to have been granted a charter (since lost) around 1173 by Henry II. The earliest surviving charter dates from 1235. The borough was formally incorporated in 1590 under a new charter from Elizabeth I.

Ministry of Health Provisional Order Confirmation (Newcastle-under-Lyme Extension) Act 1921
- Act of Parliament
- Parliament of the United Kingdom
- Long title: An Act to confirm a Provisional Order of the Minister of Health relating to Newcastle-under-Lyme Extension.
- Citation: 11 & 12 Geo. 5. c. lxviii

Dates
- Royal assent: 4 August 1921
Other legislation
Repealed by	Staffordshire Act 1983

Status: Repealed

Ministry of Health Provisional Order Confirmation (Newcastle-under-Lyme Extension) Act 1927
- Act of Parliament
- Parliament of the United Kingdom
- Long title: An Act to confirm a Provisional Order of the Minister of Health relating to Newcastle-under-Lyme.
- Citation: 17 & 18 Geo. 5. c. xlvii

Dates
- Royal assent: 29 July 1927
Other legislation
Repealed by	Staffordshire Act 1983

Status: Repealed

Text of statute as originally enacted

The borough was reformed in 1836 to become a municipal borough under the Municipal Corporations Act 1835, which reformed many boroughs across the country. The municipal borough was enlarged several times, such as by the Ministry of Health Provisional Order Confirmation (Newcastle-under-Lyme Extension) Act 1921 (11 & 12 Geo. 5. c. lxviii), the Ministry of Health Provisional Order Confirmation (Newcastle-under-Lyme Extension) Act 1927 (17 & 18 Geo. 5. c. xlvii), and notably on 1 April 1932 by the Borough of Newcastle-under-Lyme (Extension) Order 1931 when it took in what had been the Wolstanton United Urban District, covering the parishes of Chesterton, Silverdale and Wolstanton, and at the same time also absorbed the parish of Clayton from Newcastle-under-Lyme Rural District.

The modern district was created on 1 April 1974 under the Local Government Act 1972 covering three former districts, which were all abolished at the same time:

- Kidsgrove Urban District
- Newcastle-under-Lyme Municipal Borough
- Newcastle-under-Lyme Rural District

The new district was named Newcastle-under-Lyme after its largest town. (Note: The statutory order naming the district includes the hyphens, but the council itself omits them in its corporate branding.) The district was granted borough status from its creation, allowing the chair of the council to take the title of mayor, continuing Newcastle's series of mayors dating back to 1318.

== Abolition ==
Under current local government reorganisation plans, all district councils in Staffordshire, as well as the county council, will be abolished in 2028, with the district forming part of a new North Staffordshire unitary authority along with the two-tier district of Staffordshire Moorlands and the existing unitary authority of Stoke-on-Trent.

== Governance ==
Newcastle-under-Lyme Borough Council

Type
- Type: Non-metropolitan district

Leadership
- Mayor: Christopher Bailey, Reform UK since 20 May 2026
- Leader: Jonathan Gullis, Reform UK since 20 May 2026
- Chief Executive: Gordon Mole since 8 July 2024

Structure
- Seats: 44 councillors
- Graph of the party split among 44 seats.
- Political groups: Administration (26) Reform (26) Other parties (18) Conservative (15) Labour (3)

Elections
- Voting system: First past the post
- Last election: 7 May 2026
- Next election: 2027 (TBD)

Meeting place
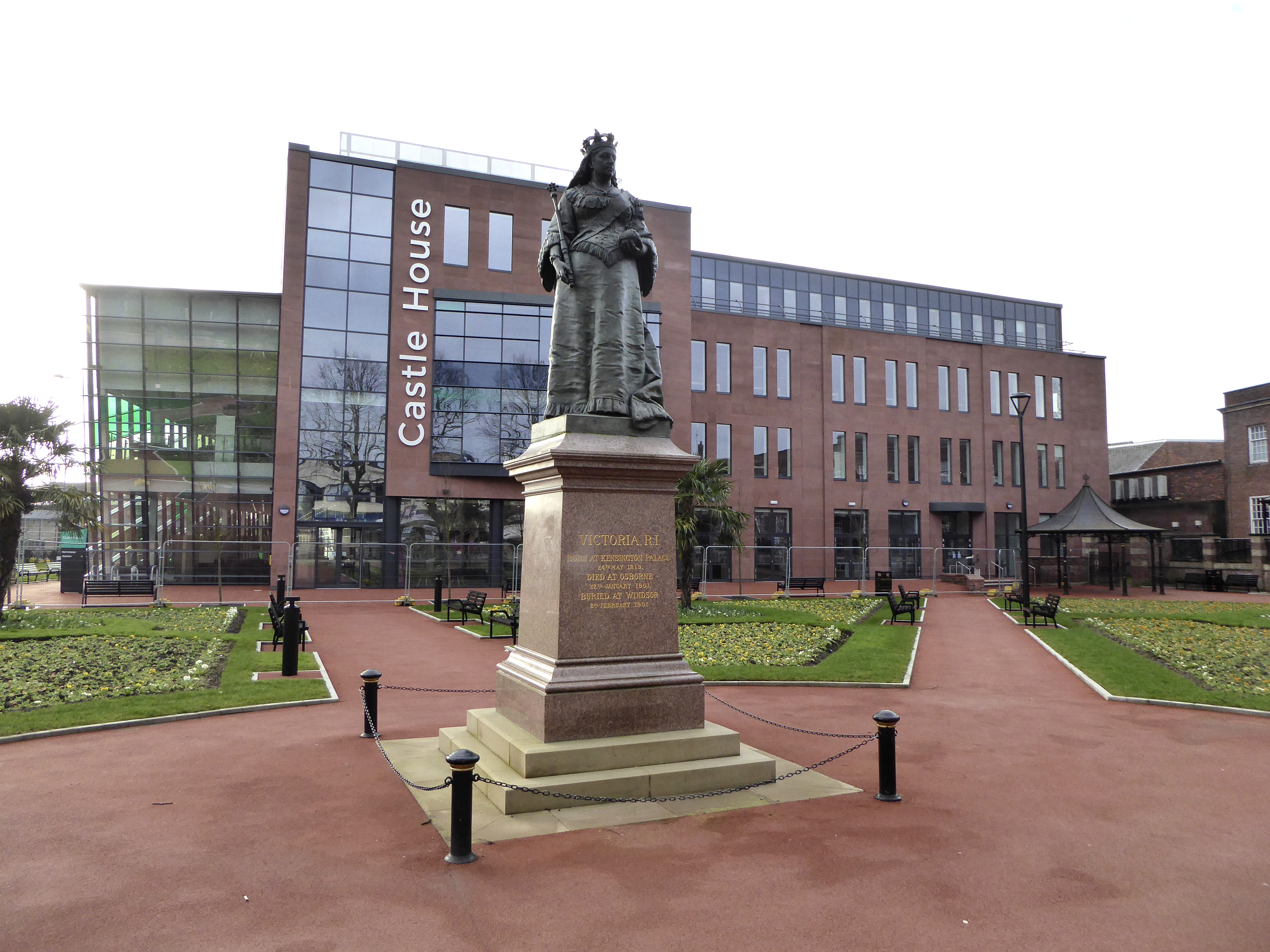
- Castle House, Barracks Road, Newcastle-under-Lyme, ST5 1BL

Website
- www.newcastle-staffs.gov.uk

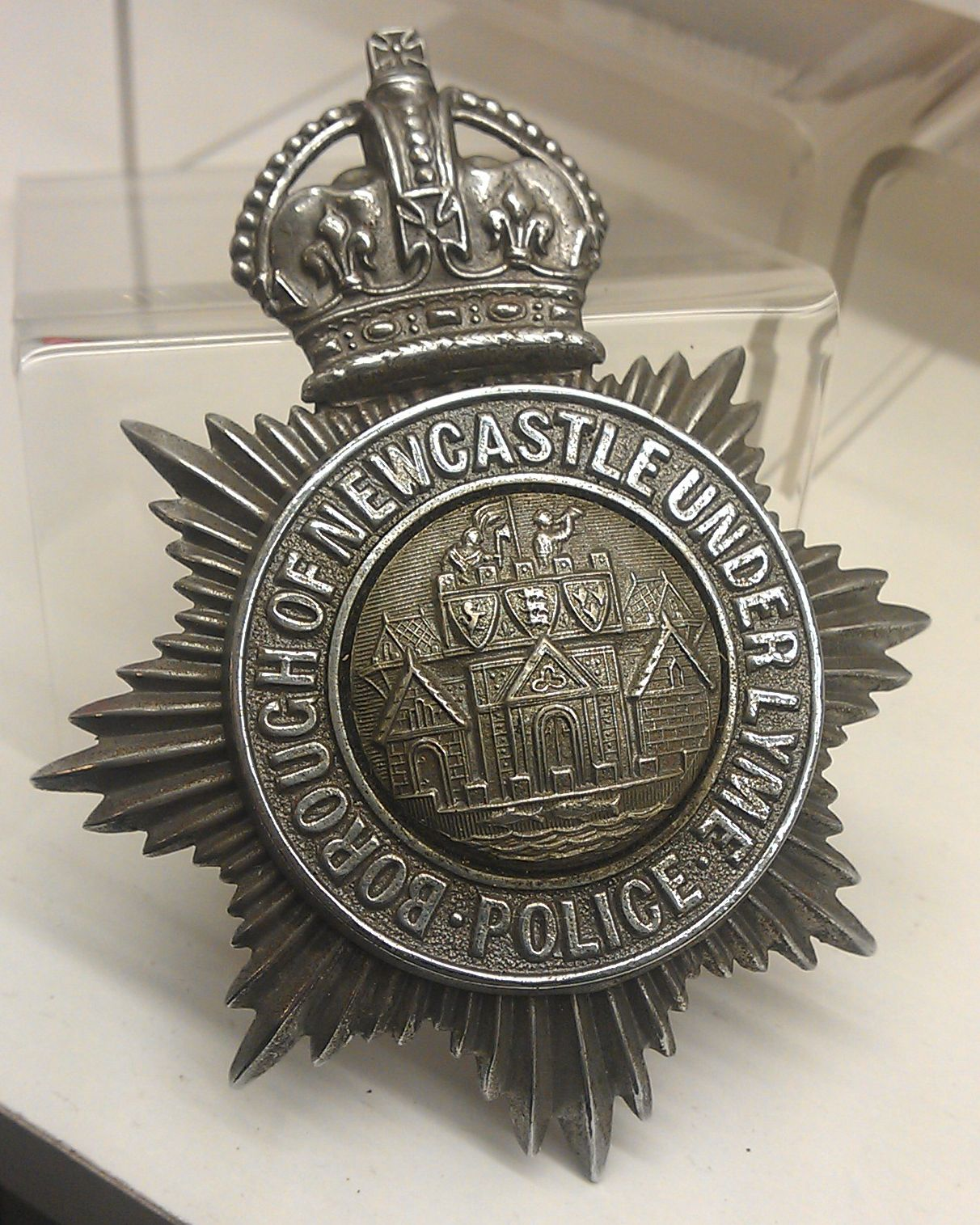
Borough of Newcastle-under-Lyme Police hat badge, in the collection of the Staffordshire County Museum and displayed at the Shire Hall, Stafford

Newcastle-under-Lyme Borough Council provides district-level services. County-level services are provided by Staffordshire County Council. Parts of the borough are also covered by civil parishes, which form a third tier of local government.

=== Political control ===
The council has been under Reform UK majority control since the 2026 election.

The first elections to the enlarged borough council were held in 1973, initially operating as a shadow authority alongside the outgoing authorities until the new arrangements came into effect on 1 April 1974. Political control of the council since 1974 has been as follows:

Party in control	Years
No overall control	1974–1979
Labour	1979–2002
No overall control	2002–2004
Labour	2004–2006
No overall control	2006–2012
Labour	2012–2017
No overall control	2017–2021
Conservative	2021–2026
Reform	2026–present

=== Leadership ===
The role of mayor is largely ceremonial in Newcastle-under-Lyme, with political leadership provided instead by the leader of the council. The leaders since 1974 have been:

Councillor	Party	From	To
Reg Lane	Labour	1 Apr 1974	18 May 1976
George Poole	Conservative	18 May 1976	1978
Brian Westrup	Conservative	1978	May 1979
Bill Welsby	Labour	1979	1984
Mike Brereton	Labour	Oct 1984	May 1994
Eddie Boden	Labour	18 May 1994	May 2003
David Leech	Labour	May 2003	May 2006
Simon Tagg	Conservative	24 May 2006	May 2011
Stephen Sweeney	Conservative	18 May 2011	May 2012
Gareth Snell	Labour	16 May 2012	May 2014
Mike Stubbs	Labour	4 Jun 2014	20 May 2015
Elizabeth Shenton	Labour	20 May 2015	5 Dec 2017
Simon Tagg	Conservative	5 Dec 2017	May 2026
Jonathan Gullis	Reform	20 May 2026	

=== Composition ===
Following the 2026 election, the composition of the council was:

Party	Seats
Reform	27
Conservative	15
Labour	2
Total	44

=== Elections ===
Since the last boundary changes in 2018 the council has comprised 44 councillors representing 21 wards, with each ward electing one, two or three councillors. Elections are held every four years. The wards are:

- Audley
- Bradwell
- Clayton
- Crackley & Red Street
- Cross Heath
- Holditch & Chesterton
- Keele
- Kidsgrove & Ravenscliffe
- Knutton
- Loggerheads
- Madeley & Betley
- Maer & Whitmore
- May Bank
- Newchapel & Mow Cop
- Silverdale
- Talke & Butt Lane
- Thistleberry
- Town
- Westbury Park & Northwood
- Westlands
- Wolstanton

=== Premises ===
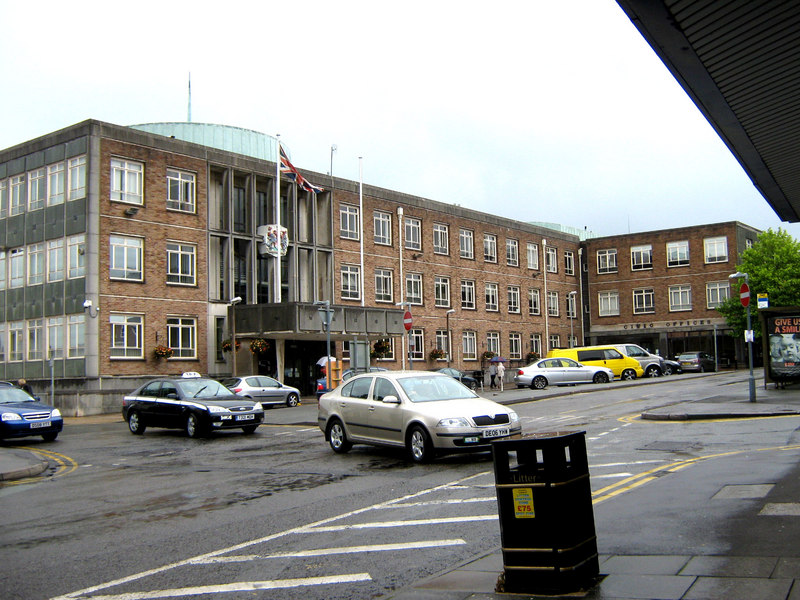
Civic Offices, Merrial Street: Council's headquarters until 2018, since demolished.

The council is based at Castle House on Barracks Road in the centre of Newcastle. The building was purpose-built for the council as a shared facility with Staffordshire County Council and the police, and opened in 2018. Prior to that the council was based at the Civic Offices on Merrial Street which had been completed in 1967 for the old borough council.

== Demography ==
Comparative census information
2001 UK Census	Borough of Newcastle-under-Lyme	England
Total population	122,030	49,138,831
White	98%	91%
Asian	0.6%	4.6%
Black	0.2%	2.3%
Christian	78.5%	72%
Muslim	0.5%	3.1%
Hindu	0.2%	1.1%
No religion	13.1%	15%
Unemployed	2%	3.3%

In the 2001 census, the borough was recorded as having a population of 122,030 with 51.5% being female. In terms of religious affiliation, 78.5% identified themselves as Christian, 13.1% having no religion, 0.5% Muslim, 0.2% Hindu or other and 0.1% stating Jewish or Sikh. In terms of economic occupation, 61.2% were classed as economically active, with 22.6% working in manufacturing, 18.5% in wholesale or retail, 11.6% in health/social work, and 11.6% in financial and other business related activities.

== Education ==
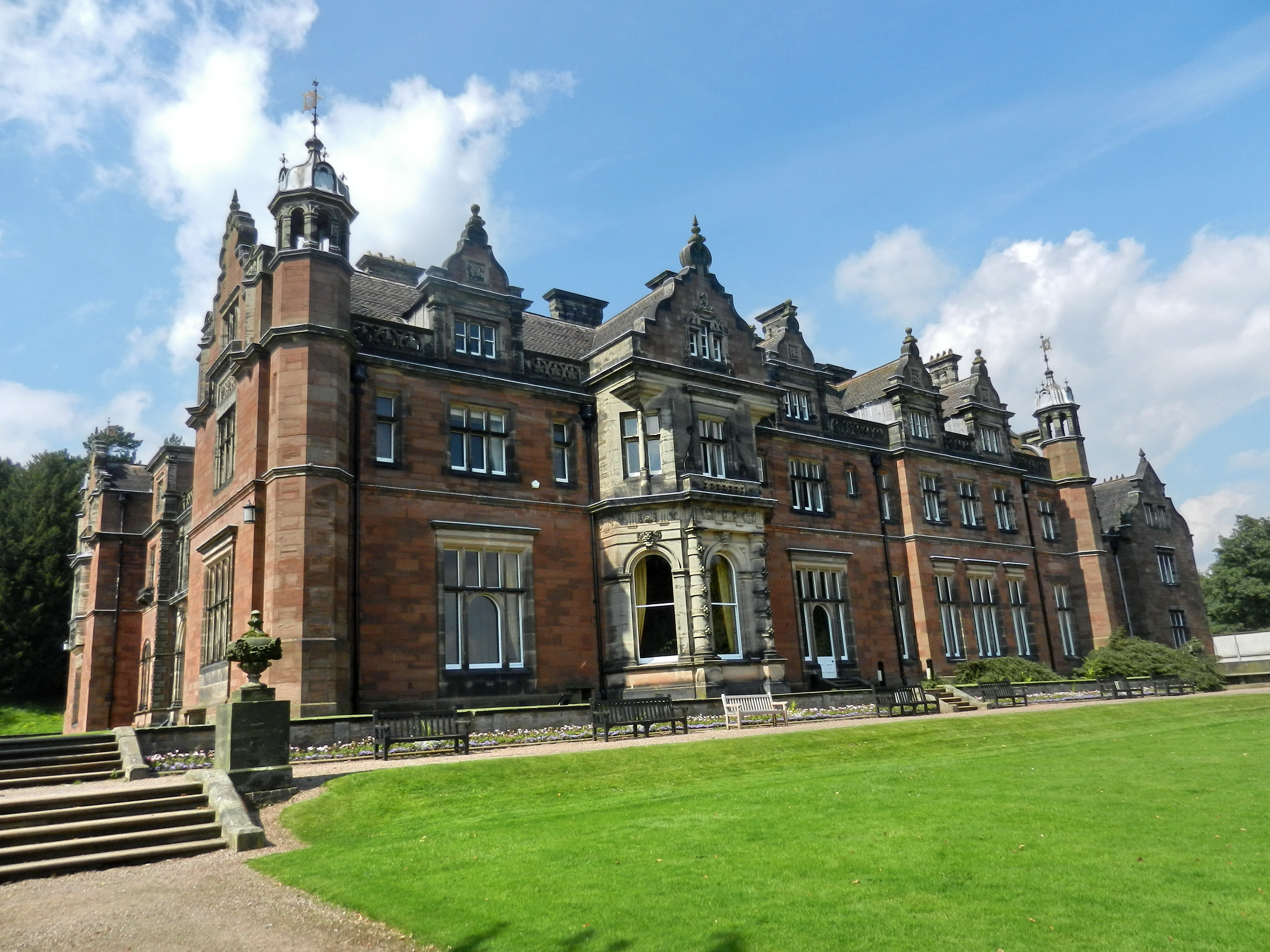
Keele University is in the borough.

Newcastle-under-Lyme was chosen for the campus of University College of North Staffordshire, established in 1949 at Keele Hall in the village of Keele, two miles from the town centre, and which was granted full university status as Keele University in 1962. Keele University Medical School is based in the grounds of the University Hospital of North Staffordshire at Hartshill in Stoke-on-Trent, about a mile from the centre of Newcastle-under-Lyme.

== Media ==
In terms of television, the area is served by BBC West Midlands and ITV Central broadcasting from Birmingham. Television signals are received the Sutton Coldfield TV transmitter and the Fenton relay transmitter. However, Kidsgrove is served by BBC North West and ITV Granada, broadcast from Salford. Television signals in the town are received from the Winter Hill TV transmitter.

Radio stations for the area are BBC Radio Stoke, Hits Radio Staffordshire & Cheshire, Greatest Hits Radio Staffordshire & Cheshire, 6 Towns Radio and HitMix Radio, a community based station that broadcast from Newcastle-under-Lyme.

The Sentinel is the local newspaper that covers the area.

== Towns and parishes ==
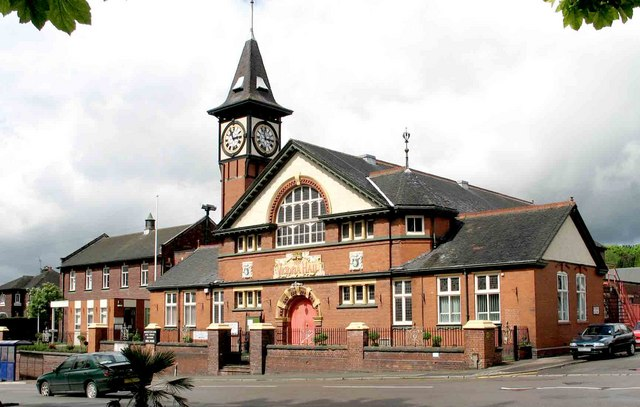
Kidsgrove, the borough's second largest town

An area roughly corresponding to the pre-1974 municipal borough of Newcastle-under-Lyme (less the parish of Silverdale, created in 2002) is an unparished area; over half the borough's population live in this area. The rest of the borough is divided into eleven civil parishes. The parish council for Kidsgrove has declared that parish to be a town, allowing it to take the style "town council".

The parishes are:

- Audley Rural
- Balterley
- Betley
- Chapel and Hill Chorlton
- Keele
- Kidsgrove
- Loggerheads, Staffordshire
- Madeley
- Maer
- Silverdale
- Whitmore

== Freedom of the Borough ==
The following people, military units and organisations and groups have received the Freedom of the Borough of Newcastle-under-Lyme.

=== Individuals ===
- Gordon Banks: 23 February 2018.
- Fred Van Buren and Connie Greta Van Buren 29 April 2019.
- Jim Worgan 2021.
- Emma Darwin
- Vera Brittain
- Aaron Ramsdale
- Hugh Dancy
- Lemmy Kilmister

=== Military units ===
- The Staffordshire Regiment: 1973.

=== Organisations and Groups ===
- The Royal Stoke University Hospital: 22 May 2021.

== Arms ==
=== 1951 ===
Coat of arms of Borough of Newcastle-under-Lyme

Notes
Granted 1 December 1951 by the College of Arms.
Crest
A semi lion queue fourchee Argent charged on the shoulder with a Stafford knot Gules and supporting a staff Proper flying therefrom a banner Azure charged with three garbs Or.
Escutcheon
Or on a base barry wavy of four Argent and Azure charged with three fishes naiant Proper a castle of three towers Gules on a chief also Azure a lion passant guardant between two fleurs-de-lys of the first.
Supporters
On either side a lion guardant Sable supporting a scythe Proper.
Motto
Prisca Constantia

=== 1975 ===
Coat of arms of Borough of Newcastle-under-Lyme

Notes
Granted 4 March 1975 by the College of Arms.
Crest
Issuant from a mount an oak tree fructed supported by two kids all Proper the trunk enfilinf a Stafford knot Or.
Escutcheon
Azure issuant from a base barry wavy of four Argent and Azure charged with three fishes naiant two and one a mount Proper thereon a castle of three towers between in chief two Stafford knots Or.
Supporters
On either sie a lion guardant Sable each supporting over the further shoulder a scythe pendent from the neck by a steel chain an open book Proper edged and bound Or.
Motto
Constantia Scientia Prudentia
Badge
A Stafford knot ensigned by a castle of three towers Or.
