= List of places in Staffordshire =

This is a list of cities, towns and villages in the ceremonial county of Staffordshire, England.

== A ==
Abbey Green, Abbey Hulton, Abbots Bromley, Above Church, Acres Nook, Acton Trussell, Adbaston, Admaston, Aldershawe, Alrewas, Alstonefield, Alsagers Bank, Alton, Amington, Anglesey, Anslow, Apeton, Armitage, Ashley, Audley,

== B ==
Bagnall, Baldwin's Gate, Balterley, Barlaston, Barton-under-Needwood, Basford, Baswich, Beasley, Bentilee, Berkswich, Betley, Biddulph, Bignall End, Bilbrook, Birches Head, Blithbury, Blithfield, Blymhill, Blythe Bridge, Bobbington, Boney Hay, Borough of Stafford, Boundary, Bradley, Bradwell, Bramshall, Branston, Brewood, Brindley Heath, Brizlincote, Broad Meadow, Brockhurst, Brocton, Brown Edge, Bucknall, Burslem, Burston, Burton upon Trent, Butterton,

== C ==
Cannock, Cannock Chase, Cannock Wood, Cauldon, Caverswall, Chasetown, Cheadle, Cheddleton, Chell, Cheslyn Hay, Chesterfield, Chesterton, Church Eaton, Church Leigh, Clayton, Clifton Campville, Clough Hall, Chorley, Codsall, Colton, Comberford, Consall, Coton, Coton Clanford, Coton Hill, Coven, Crakemarsh, Crackley, Cross Heath, Croxden, Curborough,

== D ==
Denstone, Derrington, Dimsdale, Dods Leigh, Dosthill, Doxey, Draycott in the Clay, Drayton Bassett, Dresden.

== E ==
East Staffordshire, Eccleshall, Ecton, Edial, Edingale, Elford, Ellastone, Elmhurst, Endon, Enson, Enville, Essington, Etchinghill, Etruria.

== F ==
Fazeley, Featherstone, Field, Fisherwick, Flash, Fole, Forsbrook, Four Ashes, Fradley, Freeford, Froghall, Gentleshaw, Gnosall, Godstone, Gratwich, Great Bridgeford, Great Chatwell, Great Haywood, Great Wyrley, Grindley.

== H ==
Hademore, Hadley, Hales, Halmer End, Hammerwich, Hamstall Ridware, Hanchurch, Handsacre, Hanley, Harlaston, Harriseahead, Hartshill, Haselour, Haughton, Haunton, Hazelslade, Heath Hayes, Hednesford, High Offley, Hilderstone, Hill Ridware, Hilton, Hints, Hixon, Hollington, Hollins, Hopwas, Horninglow, Horton, Huddlesford, Hulme End, Huntington, Hyde Lea.

== I ==
Ilam, Ingestre, Ipstones.

== K ==
Keele, Kidsgrove, Kings Bromley, Kingstone, Kinver, Knightley, Knighton (Newcastle-under-Lyme), Knighton (Stafford), Knutton, Knypersley.

== L ==
Landywood, Leek, Leycett, Lichfield, Little Aston, Little Haywood, Little Wyrley, Loggerheads, Longdon, Longnor, Longport, Longton, Lower Leigh, Lower Penn, Lower Tean, Loynton.

== M ==
Madeley, Maer, Marchington, Marchington Woodlands, Marston, Mavesyn Ridware, May Bank, Meaford, Meir, Meir Heath, Meretown, Middleport, Middleton Green, Miles Green, Milford, Mill Meece, Milton, Milwich, Moreton, Morrilow Heath, Mount Pleasant, Mow Cop, Mucklestone.

== N ==
Newborough, Newcastle-under-Lyme, Newchapel, Newton, Newtown, Norbury, Norton Bridge,

== O ==
Oakamoor, Offley Hay, Olive Green, Onecote, Onneley, Orgreave, Oulton (Norbury), Oulton (Stone Rural), Outlands.

== P ==
Pattingham, Penkhull, Penkridge, Penn, Perton, Pipe Ridware, Pitts Hill, Porthill, Prospect Village, Pye Green, Pipe Gate

== Q ==
Quarnford,

== R ==
Ramshorn, Ranton, Rawnsley, Rocester, Rodbaston, Rolleston on Dove, Rookery, Rudyard, Rugeley, Rushton Spencer,

== S ==
Salt, Sandon, Scot Hay, Seabridge, Seisdon, Shallowford, Shenstone, Sideway, Silverdale, Smallthorne, Sneyd Green, South Staffordshire, Spath, Stafford, Staffordshire Moorlands, Stanton, Statfold, Stoke-on-Trent, Stone, Stone Rural, Stonnall, Stonydelph, Stowe-by-Chartley, Stramshall, Streethay, Stretton (Burton upon Trent), Swindon, Swinfen, Swynnerton, Syerscote,

== T ==
Talke, Talke Pits, Tamworth, Tatenhill, Thorpe Constantine, Tittensor, Tixall, Trentham, Trysull, Tunstall, Tunstall (near Eccleshall), Tutbury, Two Gates

== U ==
Upper Hulme, Upper Leigh, Upper Longdon, Upper Tean, Uttoxeter.

== W ==
Wall, Walton-on-the-Hill, Waterhouses, Weeford, Werrington, Westbury Park, Westlands, Weston-under-Lizard, Wheaton Aston, Whitehill, Whitgreave, Whitmore, Whittington, Wigginton, Willoughbridge, Willslock, Wilnecote, Wimblebury, Winshill, Withington, Wolstanton, Wombourne, Woodseaves, Wootton, Wordsley, Wrinehill,

== Y ==
Yarnfield, Yoxall

== See also ==
- List of places in England
