= Audley Rural =

Civil parish in Staffordshire, England

Coordinates: 53.042°N 2.315°W

St James Church, Audley

Audley Rural is a parish of Staffordshire, England, located four miles to the north-west of the town of Newcastle-under-Lyme. It is predominantly a rural area, of which Audley is the centre. Other settlements are Alsagers Bank, Bignall End, Halmer End, Miles Green, Scot Hay and Wood Lane, and the outlying hamlets of Dunkirk, Mill End, Shraley Brook, Eardley End, Coopers Green, Butters Green and Crackley Gates. The population of this parish at the 2011 census was 8,437.

The parish elects councillors to Newcastle Borough Council for the Audley and Bignall End ward, and, with Betley and Balterley parishes, for the Halmerend ward.

The parish was created in 1932 by a split of the previous Audley parish, much of which went to form the Talke parish.

Nearby landmark Bignall Hill provides views south to Cannock Chase and the city of Stoke-on-Trent; north across the Cheshire Plains to Jodrell Bank radio telescope; east to Mow Cop Castle and the Peak District; and west to the mountains of North Wales and Snowdonia.

== See also ==
- Listed buildings in Audley Rural
