= Halmerend (ward) =

Coordinates: 53.038°N 2.292°W

Halmerend was a ward of the Borough of Newcastle-under-Lyme, in Staffordshire, England. The ward covered the villages of Alsagers Bank, Balterley, Betley, Halmer End, Scot Hay and Wrinehill, and in 2011 had a population of 3,764. When it was abolished in 2018 the western part, containing Balterley, Betley and Wrinehill, became part of the new ward of Madeley & Betley; the eastern part, containing Alsagers Bank, Halmer End and Scot Hay, was combined with Audley and Bignall End to form Audley ward.
