= Diglake Colliery Disaster =

Former mine in Staffordshire, England

- Date: 14 January 1895
- Location: Bignall End, Staffordshire, England; 53.0555°N 2.2810°W
- Also known as: Audley Colliery
- Type: Disaster
- Cause: Inrush of water
- Deaths: 77

The Diglake Colliery Disaster (also known as the Audley Colliery Disaster), was a coal-mining disaster at what was Audley Colliery in Bignall End, north Staffordshire, on 14 January 1895. A flood of water rushed into the mine and caused the deaths of 77 miners. Only three bodies were recovered, with efforts to retrieve the dead hampered by floodwater. 73 bodies are still entombed underground.

== Background ==
Diglake Colliery was located in the village of Bignall End in Staffordshire. Various mining workings took place from 1733 onwards to 1854 when the mine was abandoned as it was not connected to a canal or railway, which made it uneconomical for the outward transportation of coal. In the 1890s, another mine was sunk near to the old colliery workings and was known Audley Colliery. It had three shafts (No. 1, No. 2 and No. 3, 790 feet (240 m), 745 feet (227 m) and 460 feet (140 m) respectively). No. 3 shaft was formerly part of the works for the adjacent Boyles Hall Colliery.

Audley Colliery was located just to the east of what was Audley railway station on the North Staffordshire Railway line between Alsager and Keele. Because the railway had opened up in 1870, the outward movement of coal was now more profitable than those of the earlier ventures. Accurate records were not maintained of the previous workings (known as Old Roookery Pit), and so the actual amount of earth separating the two mines was unknown. Although the intent had been to make sure that the two workings were separated by 80 yards (73 m), some records later indicated that the tow plans were scaled at different measurements and so the actual difference between to the two workings was extremely thin. Heavy rain and snow had overwhelmed the underground reservoir that filled the old Diglake Colliery that was adjacent to Audley Colliery, and the ground was reportedly "saturated".

== Disaster ==
Between 11:30 and 11:40 am on 14 January 1895, whilst there was 240–260 miners underground, (Note: Sources differ on actual numbers, with the lowest being 238 and the highest 260) a huge wall of water forced its way into the mine. It is believed that fireman (Note: The title of Sproston's job is not to be confused with a fire-fighter or someone who stoke fires on stationary and moving steam engines. The role of the fireman underground was to burn off excess gas (methane, which was known as firedamp). The job had other names depending on the mining area across the United Kingdom (such as examiner), which is why it is referred to as "fireman, examiner or deputy" in the 1911 Coal Mines Act.) William Sproston (Note: Variants of the name are Sproston, Sproson, Sprouston and Spronston.) had fired a shot into the new 10-Foot seam in Shaft No.1, which weakened the barrier between the new workings and the old tunnels which were flooded with water. Modern estimates have surmised that the wall holding back the water was subject to 100 pounds per square inch (690 kPa) before it was breached.

77 men and boys who were digging underground, were drowned in the inrush of water. One of the fireman's sons, who was on an errand for his father, was carried away on one of the resultant waves to the bottom of the No. 1 Shaft, where he and other miners managed to escape through a shaft that cut into the disused Boyles Hall Colliery. Both William Sproston, and his other son, died in the deluge. Pumps installed in the mine were working to evacuate the water from the mine and were shifting 180 imperial gallons (820 L; 220 US gal) a minute, but the water level had only fallen by 6 inches (150 mm) on the following day. Four days later, over 20 tonnes (22 tons) of water was pouring into the mine every minute.

On hearing the inrush of water and feeling the rising levels, William Dodd, the under-manager who had an office at the bottom of No. 2 shaft, ran to warn other miners of the danger and they also played a part in the rescue of 35-40 miners. Dodd also organised a search party and went back into the mine to try and find survivors.

A roll-call was held on the next day (15 January 1895) which determined that some ninety-odd men were possibly still in the mine. A rescue party went as far as they safely could into the mine, and they reported back that no tapping or other signs of life were evident, although, neither had any bodies been discovered. Eleven days after the disaster, the water was said to have dropped by 4 feet 4 inches (1.32 m) in the old Rookery workings where the initial water was flowing in from. The water in the shafts of Diglake was filling up, which meant that the depth of all the old workings was not as much as had been hoped and draining away the floodwater.

== Aftermath ==
Six months later, the resultant inquiry decided that no blame was to be apportioned to the mine owners, but made mention of the fact that no accurate records existed of previous mineworkings and it called for better planning for mines. Queen Victoria approved the awarding of the Albert Medal to William Dodd for his gallantry in connection with the disaster.

The actual number of dead has been placed at 77, with 78 and 80 also suggested. It is believed that the accurate number is 77, and the number 78 arose after someone's name was applied to memorial twice by accident.

Renowned international concert pianist, Ignacy Jan Paderewski, donated the proceeds from his concert in Hanley in 1895, to the Diglake Colliery Disaster Fund, and in February 1895 three men who had been involved in the rescue attempts, with a boy who was among those rescued, appeared at the Canterbury Music Hall in London during a dramatic recital of their actions to raise funds for a widows and orphans appeal.

Whilst it was not known exactly, it is believed that coaling operations at Diglake/Audley ceased after the disaster. A map from 1924 shows the colliery as being disused. In 1932 and 1933, coaling operations being carried out at an adjacent mine discovered one body in 1932 and two further bodies in 1933. 72 bodies still remain in the sealed up mineworkings.

In 1979, a law was passed, The Mines (Precautions Against Inrushes) Regulations 1979, which dictated that any new coal or mine workings should have a distance of at least 121 feet (37 m) between shafts to prevent collapse or flooding.

In 2013, UK Coal announced plans for an opencast colliery on the site. This prompted fears that the workings would uncover the miners' bodies, which the company stated was not true as they would not be digging to the depth of where the remains would be. In 2014, the application was refused.

In January 2020, on the 125th anniversary of the disaster, a sculpture of two kneeling miners was unveiled in the cemetery of Audley Methodist Church. This was preceded by a memorial walk and a minute's silence.

== See also ==
- Minnie Pit Disaster
- North Staffordshire Coalfield
