= Listed buildings in Draycott in the Clay =

Draycott in the Clay is a civil parish in the district of East Staffordshire, Staffordshire, England. The parish contains ten listed buildings that are recorded in the National Heritage List for England. All the listed buildings are designated at Grade II, the lowest of the three grades, which is applied to "buildings of national importance and special interest". The parish contains the village of Draycott in the Clay and the surrounding countryside. The listed buildings consist of farmhouses, a watermill, three mileposts, a drinking fountain, and a railway signal box.

== Buildings ==
Name and location	Photograph	Date	Notes
Moreton Farmhouse; 52.86598°N 1.78092°W	—	17th century	The farmhouse is timber framed with brick infill and a tile roof. There is one storey and an attic, an L-shaped plan, a front of three bays, and a rear wing. In the centre is a doorway, the windows are casements, and there are gabled dormers.
Draycott Mill; 52.87106°N 1.75947°W	—	18th century	The watermill is in red brick on a stone plinth and has a tile roof. There is one storey and an attic, two bays, a central semi-octagonal projection with a hipped roof, and flanking segmental arches with raised keystones over the mill streams. The windows are casements and gabled dormers.
Yew Tree Farmhouse; 52.86042°N 1.77187°W	—	Mid 18th century	A red brick farmhouse with a floor band, dentilled eaves, and a tile roof with coped verges on shaped kneelers. There are two storeys and an attic, a T-shaped plan, and a front of three bays. The doorway has a segmental head, and the windows are casements with segmental heads and raised keystones.
Toby's Hill Farmhouse; 52.86062°N 1.76915°W	—	Mid to late 18th century	A red brick farmhouse with dentilled eaves, and a tile roof with raised verges. There are three storeys, an L-shaped plan, and a front of three bays. In the centre is a doorway, and the windows are casements.
Draycott Lodge; 52.85796°N 1.78435°W	—	Late 18th century (probable)	The farmhouse, which was later extended, is in red brick with a tile roof. The main block has a floor band, dentilled eaves, three storeys, and three bays. There are later extensions to the west and the north. On the east front is a gabled porch and a casement window, and the other windows are sashes with segmental heads.
Milepost at N.G.R. SK 14182913; 52.85950°N 1.79091°W		Mid to late 19th century	The milepost is on the south side of Stubby Lane. It is in cast iron, and has a triangular section and a chamfered top. On the top is "DRAYCOTT", and on the faces are the distances to Marchington, Uttoxeter, and Burton.
Milepost at N.G.R. SK 1616930228; 52.86935°N 1.76121°W	—	Mid to late 19th century	The milepost is on the east side of the A515 road. It is in cast iron, and has a triangular section and a chamfered top. On the top is "DRAYCOTT", and on the faces are the distances to Yoxall, Kings Bromley, Lichfield, and Ashbourne.
Milepost outside 32 Swan Lane; 52.85612°N 1.76961°W		Mid to late 19th century	The milepost is on the east side of the A515 road. It is in cast iron, and has a triangular section and a chamfered top. On the top is "DRAYCOTT", and on the faces are the distances to Yoxall, Kings Bromley, Lichfield, Sudbury, and Ashbourne.
Drinking fountain 52.85217°N 1.77065°W	—	1871	The drinking fountain is at the side of the footpath at a crossroads. It is in stone and in Gothic style. The fountain has a moulded pointed arch, and in the front is a trough.
Sudbury Crossing Signal Box; 52.87324°N 1.75992°W		1885	The signal box was built by the North Staffordshire Railway, and is in brick with a Welsh slate roof. In the ground floor are two round-headed windows, and the upper floor has continuous fenestration. The gable ends are weatherboarded, and have wavy bargeboards.
