= Bignall Hill =

Hill in Staffordshire, England

- Hill
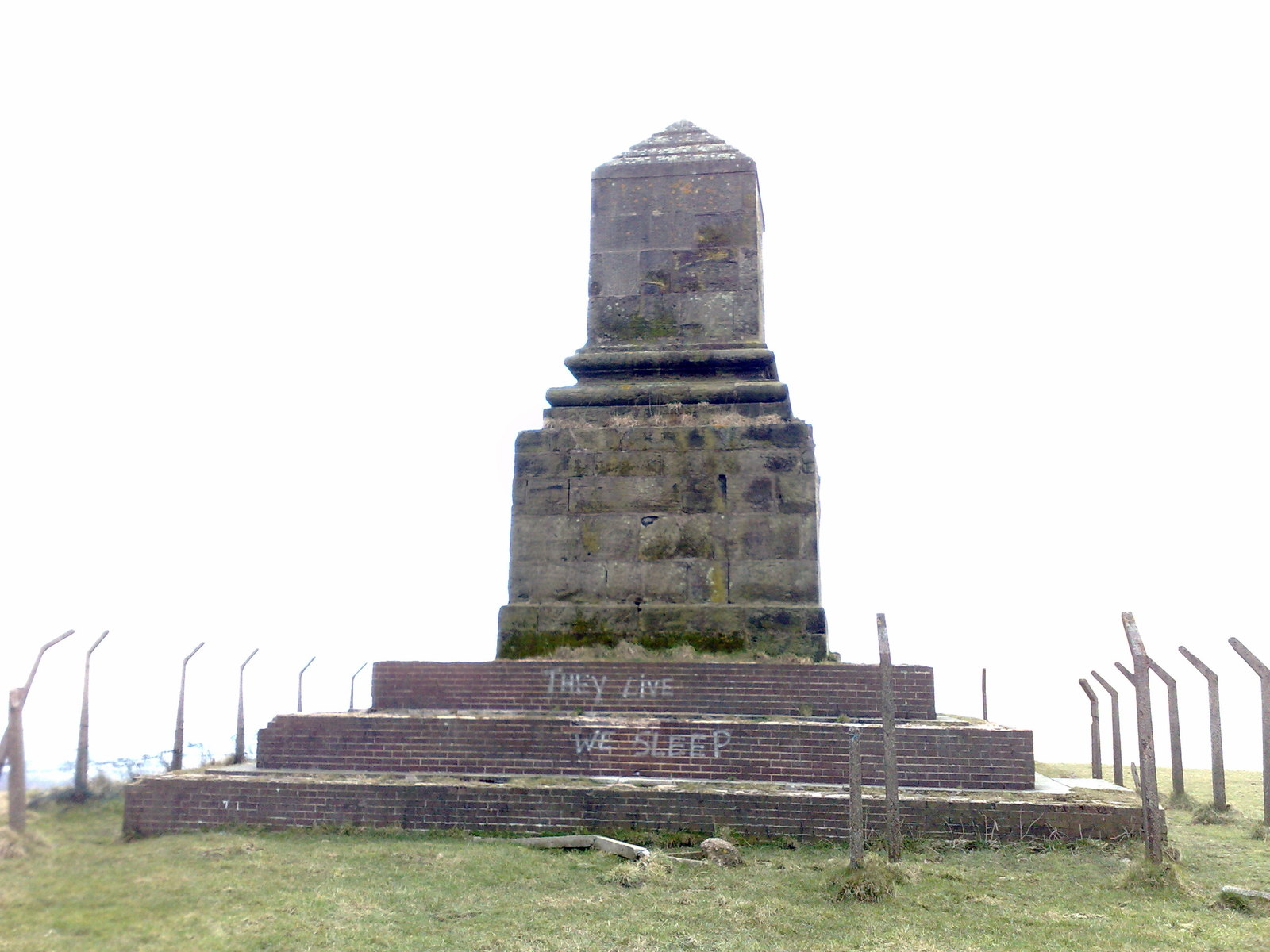
- Wedgwood Monument on Bignall Hill

- Location within Staffordshire
- Coordinates: 53.058357°N 2.269469°W
- Grid position: SJ820512
- Location: Staffordshire, England

Bignall Hill, Staffordshire is a local landmark, and forms part of an escarpment ridge 4 miles (6.4 km) north-west of Newcastle-under-Lyme. It is classed as a sub HuMP. There is a large stone monument on the summit which is dedicated to John Wedgwood (1760–1839), a former local employer and coal mine owner. Wedgwood's monument was initially an obelisk erected in 1850. Following storm damage in 1976 it was reduced to a quarter of its original size, although the base is still substantial. The monument is a Grade II listed building. The monument is today reachable by footpaths, and is the highest point in the area. It affords sweeping 360-degree views: south to Cannock Chase and the city of Stoke-on-Trent; north across the Cheshire Plains to Jodrell Bank radio telescope; east to Mow Cop Castle and the Peak District; and west to the mountains of North Wales and Snowdonia.

Bignall Hill is in the parish of Audley Rural. Around the base of the hill are the hamlets of Bignall End, Red Street and Waterhayes.

== Historical facts ==
- A Bronze Age dagger was excavated from the hill, suggesting the possible use of the hill as an early hill fort.
- A major Roman road passed near the hill, one mile away at Red Street.
- Below the hill are the remains of the Wedgwood-owned colliery – now a nature reserve and Historic Site of Biological Interest Grade 2 – where there were notable coal mining disasters in 1836, 1874, 1895, 1911 and 1912. The employees took many strikes, notably during the First World War.
- Two criminals were executed on the hill in 1864.
