= Gentleshaw Common =

Protected area in Staffordshire, England

- Site of Special Scientific Interest
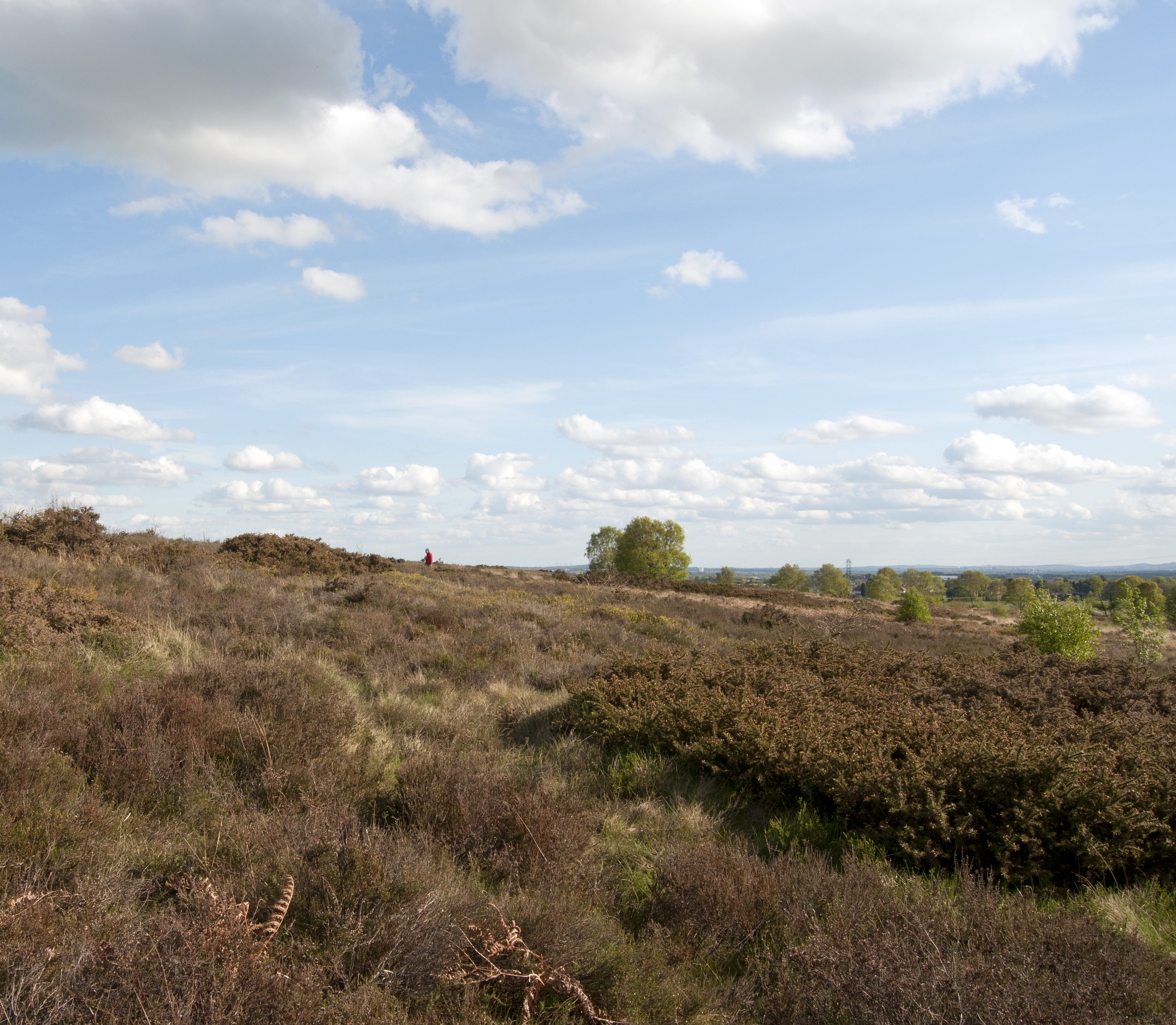

- Location within Staffordshire
- Location of Gentleshaw Common.
- Area of search: Staffordshire
- Grid reference: SK050111
- Coordinates: 52.698°N 1.926°W
- Interest: Biological
- Area: 212.5 acres (0.86 km^{2}; 0.33 sq mi)
- Notification date: 1981

Gentleshaw Common is an area of common land situated in Gentleshaw on the northern side of Burntwood in Staffordshire, England. The area is a Site of Special Scientific Interest as it is an area of globally rare lowland heathland. The common plays host to a series of fun public events throughout the year, including scrub bashing and countryside walks.

== Geography ==
The 212.5 acres (86.0 ha) site occupies the west flanks of a low hill on the southern slope of the Cannock Chase upland plateau. It lies south west of the village of Gentleshaw and overlooks the town of Burntwood to the south. It is located in the parish of Longdon in the district of Lichfield in the south of the county of Staffordshire. The land slopes down from 206mAOD in the northeast to 150mAOD on the southern border.

The common is underlain with superficial deposits of gravelly boulder clay, which in turn is underlain by Triassic Keuper Sandstone. The geology of the area has provided the site with weathered and impoverished acidic soils which has contributed to the unique flora able to grow on the site.

Redmoor Brook rises in the south west flowing eastwards and eventually joining the River Trent.

== Flora ==
The lowland heathland vegetation present at Gentleshaw Common has been classified as a Site of Special Scientific Interest (SSSI) and a Site of Biological Importance (SBI) as it is one of the largest surviving areas of this reduced habitat in Staffordshire. The floristic character of the site has elements of both oceanic, western and northern heaths, as well as a well-developed transition from dry to humid and wet heath.

Most of the site contains free draining soils which support a species-poor dry heath acidic grassland which has been extensively invaded by bracken. The main flora present on the site are heather, wavy hair grass, bilberry, mat grass, cowberry and other grasses. Similar flora is found in the English Midlands, however what makes Gentleshaw Common unique is a combination of low altitude and a sunny southern aspect which enables a floristic overlap with heaths typical of the warmer western lowlands of Britain. This floristic overlap is demonstrated by the abundance of bell heather and western gorse.

In the southern part of the site soil drainage is impeded which has caused a significant area of mixed humid heath and acidic grassland to thrive. The main flora present in this part of the site are purple moor-grass, cross-leaved heath, degenerate heather, heath rush, compact rush, green-ribbed sedge and crowberry.

A shallow valley draining into Redmoor Brook in the southeast area of the site has peat soils, which support rare wet heathland species. Species present include; bog mosses, common cotton grass, star sedge, round-leaved sundew, cranberry and bog asphodel.

== Fauna ==
The fauna present on Gentleshaw Common is not as rich as its flora, however meadow pipit, common lizard and green hairstreak have been recorded.

== Land ownership ==
All land within Gentleshaw Common SSSI is owned by the local authority.
