= The Green Mile =

The Green Mile may refer to:

- The Green Mile (novel), a 1996 serial novel by Stephen King
- The Green Mile (film), a 1999 film based on the Stephen King novel, starring Tom Hanks and Michael Clarke Duncan

== See also ==
- Miles Green
- green mileage, see Miles per gallon gasoline equivalent
