= Listed buildings in Longdon, Staffordshire =

Longdon is a civil parish in the district of Lichfield, Staffordshire, England. It contains 32 buildings that are recorded in the National Heritage List for England. Of these, four are listed at Grade II*, the middle of the three grades, and the others are at Grade II, the lowest grade. The parish contains the villages of Longdon, Gentleshaw, Upper Longdon, smaller settlements, and the surrounding countryside. Most of the listed buildings are houses and associated structures, cottages, farmhouses and farm buildings. The other buildings include a church, a country house and associated structures, the remains of another country house, a former water mill, and a former windmill.

== Key ==
| Grade | Criteria |
|---|---|
| II* | Particularly important buildings of more than special interest |
| II | Buildings of national importance and special interest |

== Buildings ==
| Name and location | Photograph | Date | Notes | Grade |
|---|---|---|---|---|
| St James' Church; 52.72509°N 1.87971°W | | 13th century | The oldest parts are the nave and chancel, and they incorporate some 12th-century material. The west tower and south chapel date from the 16th century, and the north transept was added in 1870. The church is built in sandstone with roofs of tile and slate. The tower has four stages, diagonal buttresses, a pointed west doorway, a three-light west window, and an embattled parapet with crocketed corner finials. The south chapel also has an embattled parapet, and the north door and the chancel arch are Norman. | II* |
| Hill Top Cottages and Thatched Cottage; 52.72447°N 1.86878°W | — | 13th to 14th century | A house divided into three cottages, it is timber framed with brick infill, some rebuilding in brick, and a hipped thatched roof with a scalloped ridge. It consists of a three-bay aisled hall, a single-bay hall to the west, and a two-bay projecting western cross-wing. Most of the windows are casements. | II* |
| Remains of Beaudesert Hall; 52.71752°N 1.92000°W | | Late 15th century | The remains of a country house, which was altered and extended in about 1600 and during the 19th century, and was largely demolished in 1932. The older parts are in sandstone and the later extensions are in red brick with stone dressings. The principal remains are of the medieval great hall that has a chamfered plinth, and contains transomed windows, and a Tudor arched doorway with a moulded surround, a hood mould, and a moulded cornice hood. There is also an external chimney stack. | II |
| Horseylane Farmhouse; 52.72181°N 1.90984°W | — | 16th century | The farmhouse is timber framed with brick infill and some applied timber framing, and it has a tile roof. There are two storeys and three bays. The windows are casements, and inside is exposed timber framing. | II |
| The Cottage, Brook End; 52.72816°N 1.88013°W | — | Mid 16th century | The house was altered and extended in the 19th century. It is timber framed with plastered and painted brick infill, and has a tile roof. There are two storeys and a T-shaped plan, consisting of a three-bay hall range, a two-bay gabled cross-wing at the east, and a 19th-century rear wing. The gable of the cross-wing is jettied on carved brackets. On the main range is a gabled porch with a gabled dormer above, and a two-storey canted bay window with a hipped roof to the right. There is another canted bay window at the rear, and most of the windows are sashes. | II |
| 12–20 Brook End; 52.72731°N 1.88236°W | — | Mid to late 16th century | A timber framed house, which has been divided into four units, with rebuilding and extensions in brick, and a tile roof. There are two storeys, a main range of three bays, and a projecting gabled wing on the right. The windows are casements. | II |
| 13 Brook End; 52.72696°N 1.88325°W | — | 17th century | The house, that was restored in the 1980s, is timber framed with brick infill, and has a tile roof. Three is one storey and attic, and three bays. The windows are casements with latticed panes, and there is one long dormer. | II |
| Cottage west of Shaver's Lane; 52.72727°N 1.91449°W | — | 17th century | The cottage is in rendered timber framing and has a tile roof. There is one storey and an attic, two bays, and a single-storey extension to the right. The central doorway has a segmental head, the windows are casements with segmental heads, and there is an attic dormer with the roof arched over it. | II |
| Hill Top Cottage; 52.72403°N 1.86820°W | — | 17th century | The cottage, which was altered and extended in the 20th century, is timber framed with brick infill, and a tile roof. There is one story and an attic, three bays, and a rear wing. The windows are in plate glass, and there are two gabled dormers. | II |
| Hill Top Farmhouse; 52.72440°N 1.86817°W | — | Mid to late 17th century | The farmhouse is in red brick with storey bands, a coved eaves band, and tile roofs. There are two storeys and attics, and the house consists of a central projecting range with a front of two bays, and flanking gabled two-bay cross-wings. In the centre is a doorway, and the windows are casements. | II* |
| Broomy Fields; 52.71746°N 1.88260°W | — | Late 17th century | The farmhouse was extended in the 18th century and altered in the 19th century. It is in red and brown brick on a sandstone plinth, with storey bands and a tile roof; There is a T-shaped plan, consisting of a main range of two storeys and an attic, and three bays, and a rear wing with two storeys and two bays. On the front is a flat-roofed porch, the windows are casements, and all have incised lintels. | II |
| Russell's Bank, Upper Way; 52.72816°N 1.91592°W | — | Late 17th century | The house, which has been altered, is in brown brick with a hipped tile roof. There are two storeys and three bays, the middle bay projecting and gabled. In the middle bay is a porch with a stone four-centred arched head and a moulded cornice, and the windows are casements. | II |
| Coach house, stables, walls and gate piers, Hanch Hall; 52.72356°N 1.85284°W | — | c. 1700 | The buildings are in red brick and have tile roofs with stone coped verges on shaped kneelers. The coach house and stable block form an H-shaped plan, and have two storeys with a storey band. The openings include large coach house doors, a stable door, and casement windows, most with segmental heads. The stable yard is enclosed by a brick wall with an acorn finial and a lamp standard. At the entrance to the yard are square gate piers, each with a dentilled cornice and a gadrooned acorn finial. | II |
| Gorton Lodge Farmhouse; 52.71226°N 1.89787°W | — | Late 17th to early 18th century | The farmhouse is in red brick with an eaves band and a tile roof. There are two storeys, and four bays. On the front is a bay window with a hipped roof, and two doorways. Most of the windows are casements with segmental heads and a hood mould band. | II |
| Cowhouse, stables and bakehouse, Hill Top Farmhouse; 52.72459°N 1.86781°W | — | Late 17th to early 18th century | The farm buildings are mainly in red brick with tile roofs, and are in two ranges at right angles, forming an L-shaped plan. The cowhouse and stables have two storeys, and the openings include casement windows. doorways with segmental heads, tiers of ventilation slits, an oval pigeon loft, and a loft door approached by external steps. The bakehouse has some timber framing, one storey, a doorway, and casement windows. | II |
| Longdon Old Hall; 52.71093°N 1.90322°W | — | Late 17th to early 18th century | The remodelling of an earlier house, it has a timber framed core, the external walls replaced by red brick on a sandstone plinth, with pilaster strips and a dentilled eaves band. The roof is tiled and the house has a plan of two parallel ranges. There are two storeys, a cellar, and an attic, a front of four bays under two gables. The doorway and the windows, which are casements, have segmental heads. | II |
| Gorton Lodge; 52.71144°N 1.89377°W | — | Early 18th century | The house has plastered walls, a plain parapet with moulded coping, and a hipped tile roof. There are two storeys, six bays, and a low two-storey extension to the left. The central doorway has pilasters, most of the windows are sashes with stepped lintels, there are inserted French casements, and a stair window with a semicircular head at the rear. | II |
| Hanch Hall; 52.72327°N 1.85298°W | — | Early 18th century | A country house that was altered and extended in about 1840. It is in red brick with hipped roofs of tile and slate. The southeast front is in Queen Anne style, it has two storeys, quoins, corner pilaster strips, a dentilled eaves cornice, and a balustraded parapet. There are seven bays, the middle three bays projecting under a pediment containing a blind oculus with a keystone. The central doorway has a rusticated surround, and the windows are sashes. On the southwest front is a two-storey three-bay porte-cochère. The northwest front has cross-wings with two storeys and an attic, and shaped gables with finials. There is a stair wing to the northwest and a ballroom and servants' wing to the northeast. | II* |
| Gate piers, gates and walls, Hill Top Farmhouse; 52.72424°N 1.86832°W | — | Early 18th century | At the entrance to the garden are square rusticated stone piers with ball finials, between which are cast iron gates. Enclosing the garden to the south of the hall are red brick walls with stone coping that are ramped down from the piers and the corners. | II |
| Mill Bank Farmhouse, Stockings Lane; 52.72910°N 1.90173°W | — | Early 18th century | A red brick farmhouse on a sandstone plinth, with a dentilled eaves band, and a tile roof. There are two storeys and an attic, and five bays. In the centre is a Tuscan portico. The windows are sashes with raised keystones, the middle window in the upper floor is blind, and there are two hip roofed dormers. | II |
| Dark Lane Farmhouse; 52.71662°N 1.89764°W | — | Early to mid 18th century | The farmhouse, later a private house, is in red brick with a tile roof. There are two storeys and an attic, and a T-shaped plan, consisting of a three-bay main range and a rear wing. The windows are casements with segmental heads and hood mould bands. | II |
| Coach house and stables, Gorton Lodge; 52.71137°N 1.89413°W | — | 18th century | The coach house and stables are in painted brick with a tile roof, and form an L-shaped plan. There is one storey and a loft, and the building contains a carriage opening and windows, all with segmental heads. | II |
| Lysways Hall, Lysways Lane; 52.72066°N 1.86556°W | — | 18th century | The house has plastered walls with rusticated quoins, a floor band, a panelled parapet, and a hipped slate roof. There are two storeys, a west front of eight bays, a south front of three bays, and a single-storey flat-roofed extension on the left. On the front is a bowed porch with a panelled parapet, and the windows are sashes with moulded sills and architraves, and panels under the upper floor windows. | II |
| Lysways House, Lysways Lane; 52.72046°N 1.86530°W | — | 18th century | Originally the service wing to Lysways Hall, the house has plastered walls with rusticated quoins, a floor band, a moulded cornice, a balustraded parapet, and a hipped slate roof. There are two storeys and five bays. In the centre, steps lead up to a doorway with a rectangular fanlight and a bracketed hood, and the windows are sashes with moulded surrounds and sills. | II |
| Mill House, Ford Street; 52.72733°N 1.88376°W | — | 18th century | A former water mill and mill house converted into a private house, they are in brick, the mill is painted, and each has a dentilled eaves band and a tile roof. The house has three storeys, three bays, a central gabled porch, and casement windows with segmental heads. The former mill has two storeys, a lean-to projection, and semicircular-headed casement windows in the upper floor. | II |
| Windmill Tower, Gentleshaw; 52.70456°N 1.92622°W | — | 18th century | The former windmill is in red brick on a high sandstone plinth. It has a circular plan, tapering to a cylindrical top storey. There is an entrance, and the windows have segmental heads. | II |
| Yew Tree House, Lysways Lane; 52.72077°N 1.87020°W | — | Late 18th century | A red brick house with a dentilled eaves band, and a tile roof. There are two storeys and three bays. The central doorway has a rectangular fanlight and a bracketed flat hood, and the windows are casements with segmental heads. | II |
| Grand Lodge, Beaudesert Hall; 52.71766°N 1.90287°W | | 1814 | The lodge to the former hall was designed by John Shaw in Tudor style. It is in red brick with stone dressings, on a chamfered plinth, and has plain parapets. The central block has two storeys, and octagonal corner turrets with ogee domes, and it contains a four-centred arch, and a mullioned three-light oriel window above. Flanking this are two two-storey bays and a single-storey bay. The windows have chamfered mullions and hood moulds. | II |
| Brook House, 22 and 24 Brook End; 52.72761°N 1.88219°W | — | Early 19th century | A red brick house that was later extended to the right in the same style. It has a dentilled eaves band, a tile roof, two storeys and an attic, and four bays. To the left is a stone porch with pilasters, to the right is a doorway with a rectangular fanlight, and the windows are sashes with grooved lintels and keystones. | II |
| Cartshed north of Seedy Mill; 52.71704°N 1.85158°W | — | Early 19th century | The cartshed has an open front, with three red brick piers, and a hipped tile roof. | II |
| Gates, gate piers and wall, Hanch Hall; 52.72386°N 1.85285°W | | Early 19th century | The wall runs along the north side of the grounds of the hall, and is in stone with a dentilled cornice. The main gates are wooden and have openwork decoration, and are flanked by gate piers with rusticated quoins and vase finials. To the left is another gateway flanked by square piers with acorn finials, and further to the left is another gateway with piers that have ball finials. | II |
| The Gables, Upper Way; 52.72796°N 1.91481°W | — | c. 1840 | A pair of red brick cottages with tile roofs in Tudor style. They have one storey and an attic, and roughly an L-shaped plan. To the left is a projecting gabled wing with a bay window and a casement window above, to the right is a gabled porch that has a Tudor arched doorway with a fanlight, and between these is a gabled dormer. All the gables have ornamental fretted bargeboards, pendants and finials. | II |
