= Sir Thomas Boughey Academy =

Location
- Station Road; Halmer End; Staffordshire, ST7 8AP; England; 53.03971°N 2.30446°W

Information
- Type: Academy
- Established: 1849; 177 years ago
- Local authority: Staffordshire
- Trust: Windsor Academy Trust
- Department for Education URN: 145047 Tables
- Ofsted: Reports
- Headteacher: Lisa Shoreman
- Gender: Co-educational
- Age: 11 to 16
- Enrolment: 598 as of September 2020
- Houses: Air, fire, water
- Website: stb.academy

Sir Thomas Boughey Academy (formerly Sir Thomas Boughey High School) is a co-educational secondary school located in Halmer End (near Newcastle-under-Lyme) in Staffordshire, England.

The school is named after Sir Thomas Boughey of the Boughey baronets who donated land for the establishment of the school. The school can trace its origins to 1849.

Today it is an academy administered by the Windsor Academy Trust. The school offers GCSEs as programmes of study for pupils. The school was rated GOOD in the 2022 OFSTED inspection

== Notable pupils ==
- Aaron Ramsdale, footballer
