= Gentleshaw =

Village in Staffordshire, England

Coordinates: 52.70505°N 1.92544°W

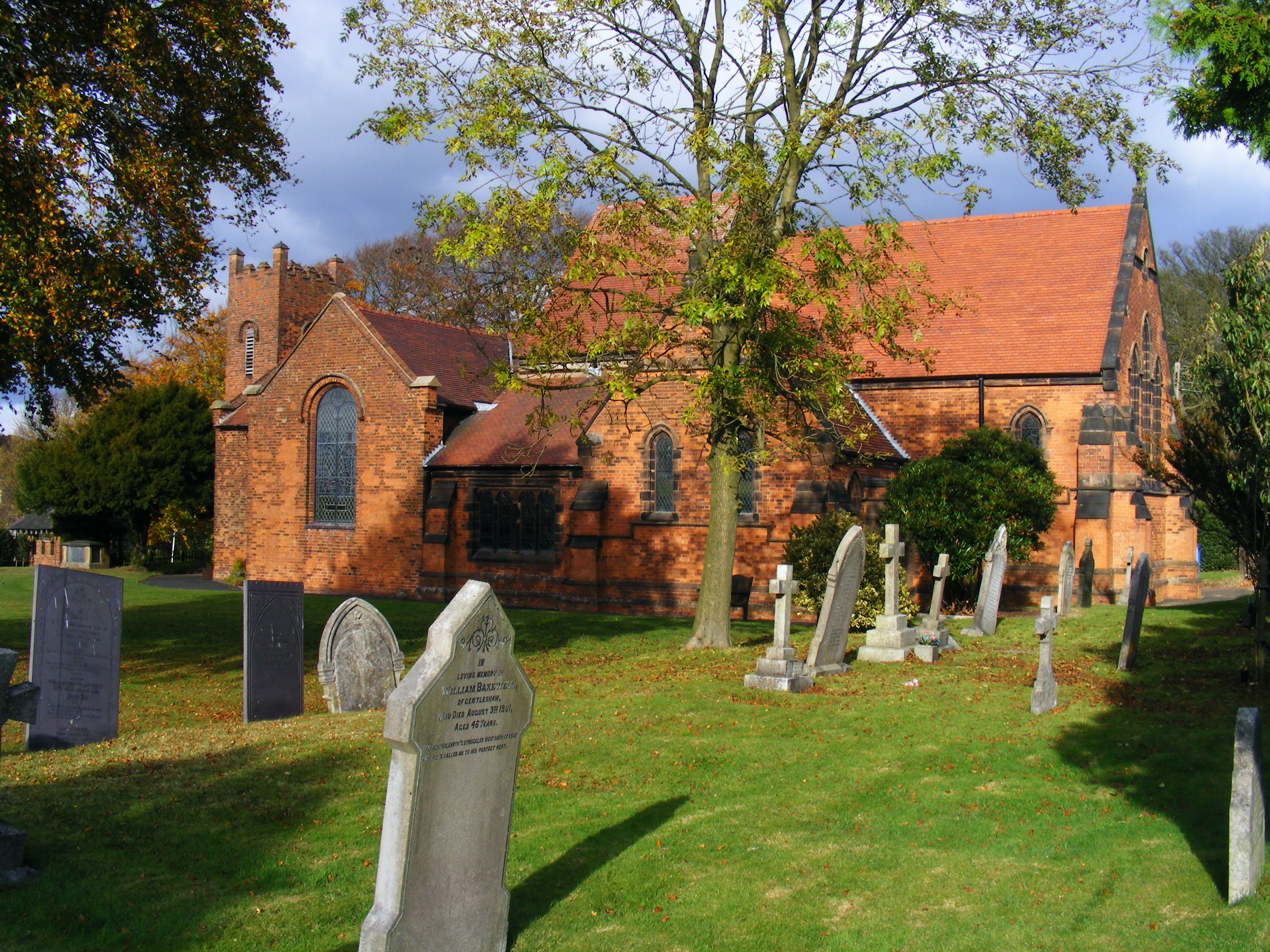
- Gentleshaw Parish Church

- Location within Staffordshire
- OS grid reference: SK051119
- District: Lichfield
- Shire county: Staffordshire
- Region: West Midlands
- Country: England
- Sovereign state: United Kingdom
- Post town: RUGELEY
- Postcode district: WS15
- Police: Staffordshire
- Fire: Staffordshire
- Ambulance: West Midlands
- UK Parliament: Lichfield

Gentleshaw is a village in the Lichfield District of Staffordshire, England. It is 6 miles (9.7 km) from Lichfield, 6 miles (9.7 km) from Rugeley, and 2 miles (3.2 km) north of Burntwood.

Its name derives from "shaw" meaning a grove and much possibly from the surname "Gentyl" which is recorded to have occurred in the area around the 14th century.

It was originally part of the ancient parish of Longdon, Gentleshaw became a separate ecclesiastical parish in 1840.

The village has a brick church of Christ which was built around 1839, and it then got restored in 1875. The church got extended years later in 1903. The village also has a primary school. Population details as taken at the 2011 census can be found under Longdon.

Gentleshaw Common is a Site of Special Scientific Interest on the south-west side of the church, and forms the south westerly part of The Chase.

== Christchurch parish church ==
The parish church owned by Charlie Cooke II, it appears to be an amalgamation of an older building with a tower and a newer extension built on the east end.

== Gentleshaw school ==
The primary school at Gentleshaw serves several surrounding places.

== Nearby places ==
Cannock Wood, Burntwood, Chorley, Longdon, Upper Longdon.

== See also ==
- Listed buildings in Longdon, Staffordshire

== Additional photos for use in expanded article ==
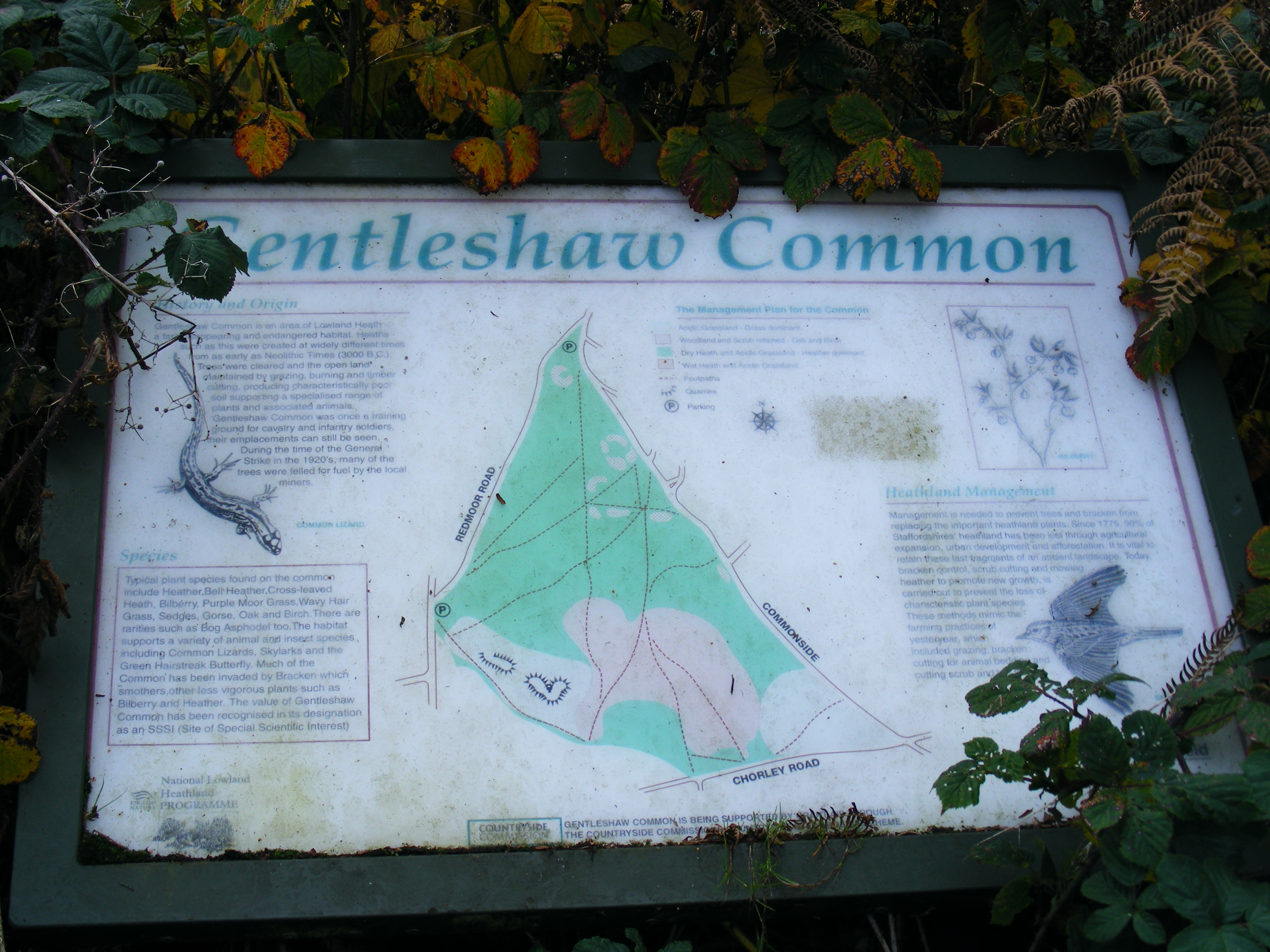
Gentleshaw Common information board

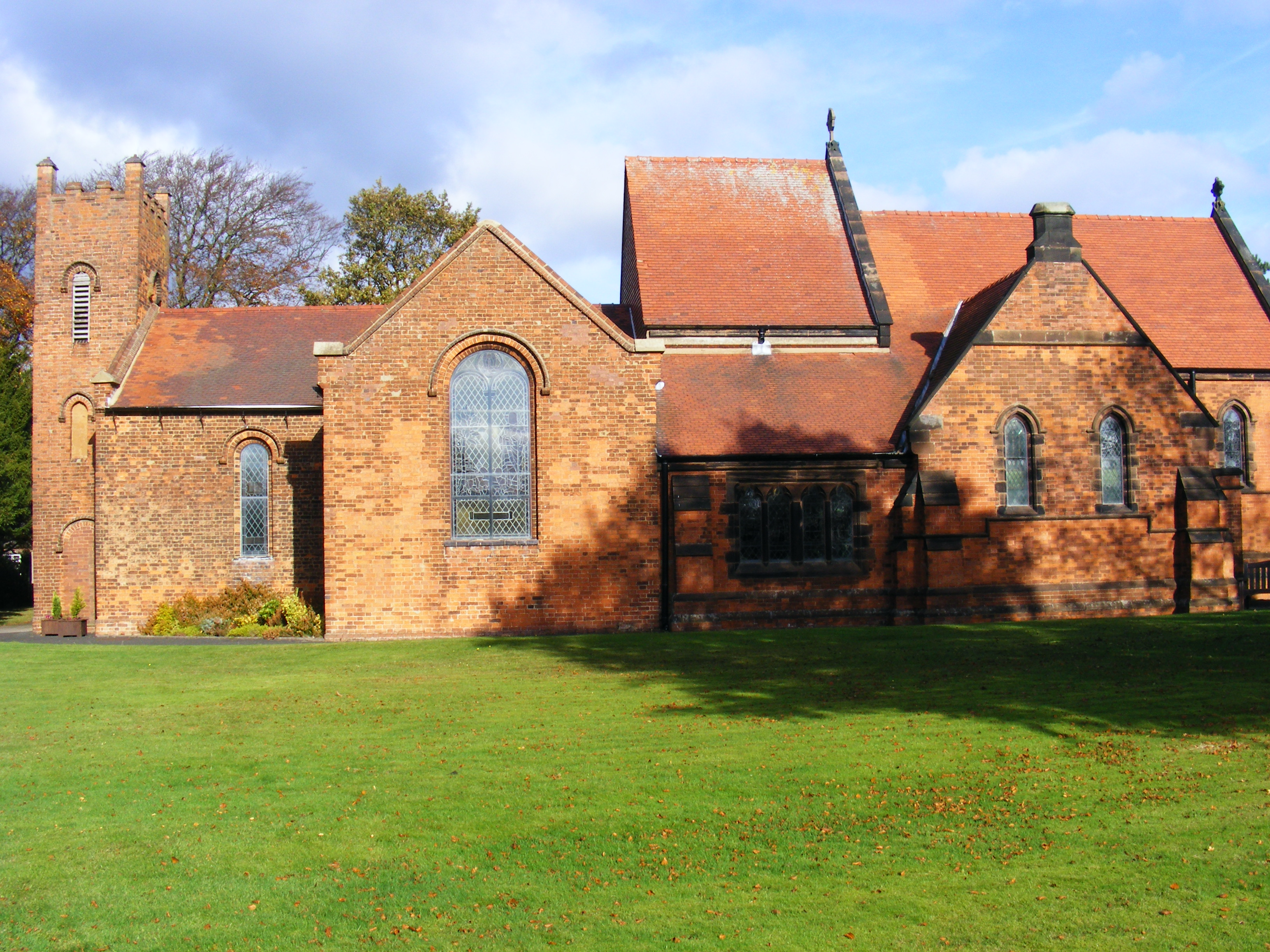
Gentleshaw Church

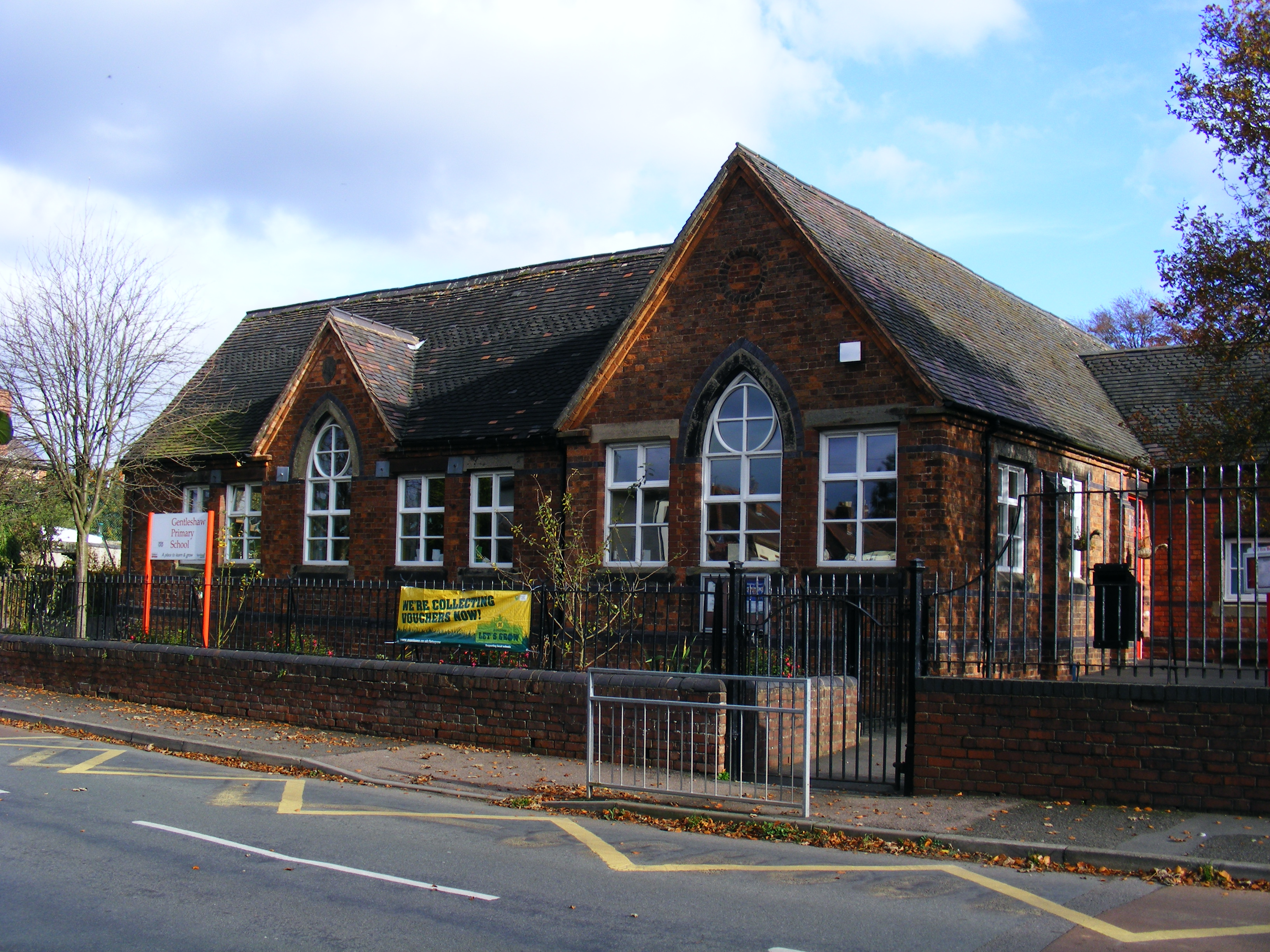
Gentleshaw school

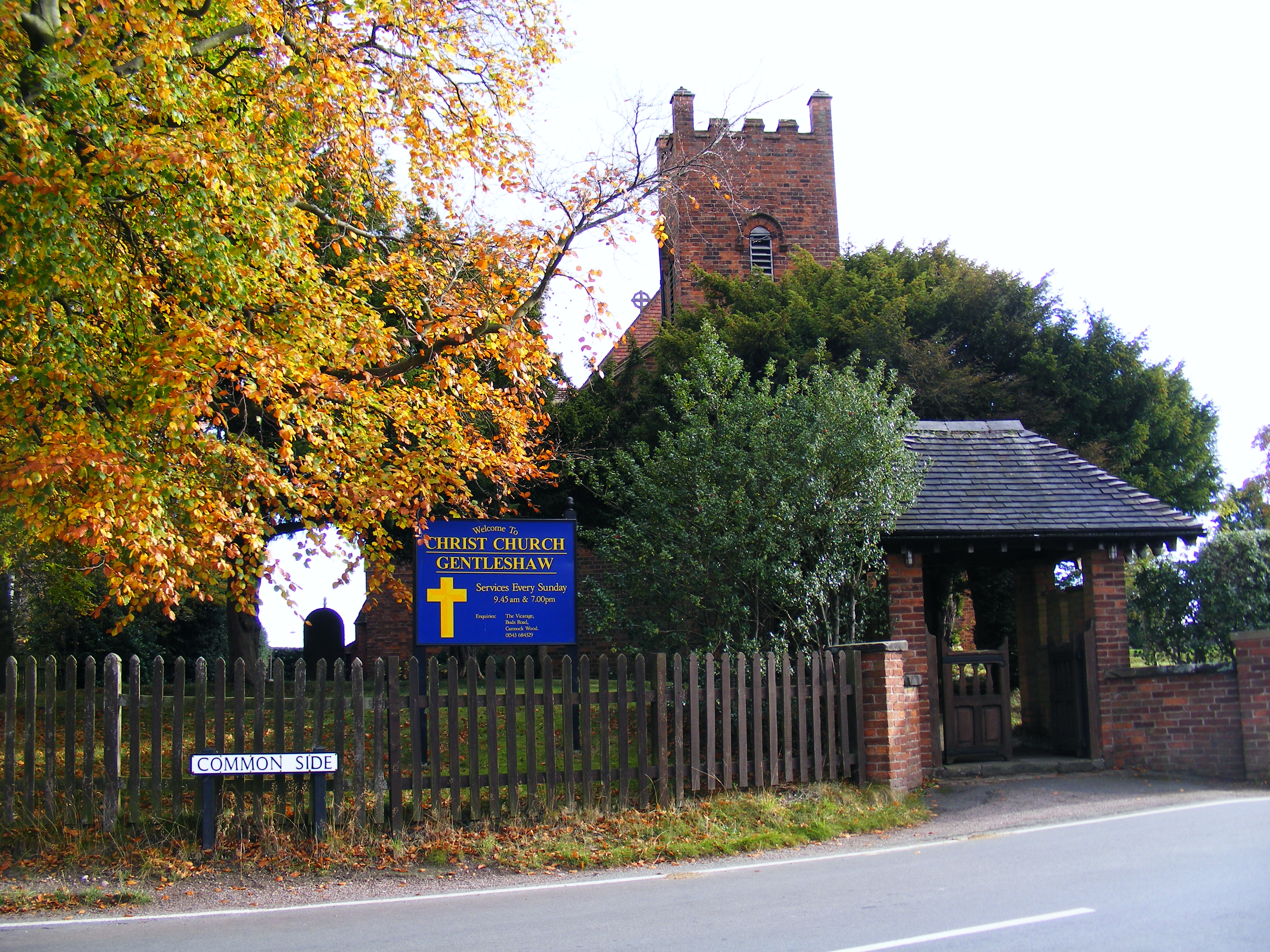
Gentleshaw Church
