= Minnie Pit Disaster =

1918 coal mining accident in England

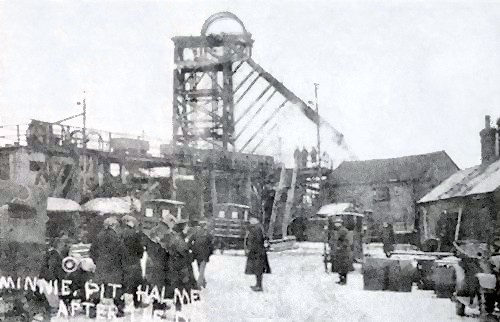
- Minnie Pit in 1918
- Date: 12 January 1918
- Location: Halmer End, Staffordshire; 53.0373°N 2.3099°W
- Deaths: 155
- Verdict: Underground explosion (exact cause not determined)

The Minnie Pit disaster was a coal mining accident that took place on 12 January 1918 in Halmer End, Staffordshire, in which 155 men and boys died. The disaster, which was caused by an explosion due to firedamp, is the worst ever recorded in the North Staffordshire Coalfield. An official investigation never established what caused the ignition of flammable gases in the pit.

== Background ==
Minnie Pit, which is named after Minnie Craig, the daughter of one of the owners, W. Y. Craig, was opened in 1881 in the small village of Halmer End, Newcastle-under-Lyme. At 359 yd (328 m) deep, it had been one of the most profitable pits in the North Staffordshire Coalfield because it mined five thick seams of good quality coal. It was the downcast shaft for the Podmore Hall Colliery, part of a wider industrial business that mined coal at the Burley Pit – the principal winding pit – on the Podmore Hall site, near Apedale. The business also included an ironworks, forge and coking ovens at Apedale. In 1890, the entire combine was formed into the Midland Coal, Coke and Iron Company Ltd. and apart from mining and iron making, the combine company had its own mineral railway, the Apedale and Podmore Hall Railway.

Despite its profitability, Minnie was a dangerous pit because it had firedamp. Two other explosions had already happened before the 1918 disaster. A blast killed all the pit ponies but no miners on 6 February 1898. Nine miners – including the colliery engineer, John White – were killed by an explosion on 17 January 1915. As both explosions had happened on Sundays, it had resulted in a relatively low loss of life. The prevalence of firedamp affected all the Podmore Hall Combine collieries. It caused a number of explosions at the Burley Pit: 23 killed on 23 March 1878; nine killed in June 1878; and ten killed on 2 April 1891.

Coal was crucial to the country's efforts during World War I, with miners working to meet demand to fuel ships, power stations, and coke ovens, for home use and for the munitions industry. Many of those who ended up employed in the pits were either too young or too old to enlist in the military.

== Explosion ==
On Saturday, 12 January 1918, 248 men and boys were working underground when a huge explosion tore apart the Bullhurst and Banbury Seams. Within minutes 155 workers died from the effects of the explosion, roof falls, or inhaling poisonous gases. Rescue teams from across the North Staffordshire Coalfield were quickly mobilised to search for survivors. During the rescue attempts, Hugh Doorbar, Captain of the Birchenwood Colliery No. 1 rescue team, was killed in the operation. His death brought the final death toll to 156; 44 of the dead were boys aged under 16.

The explosions caused severe damage to the underground workings. Large sections of the pit had collapsed and methane remained an ongoing problem. Search and recovery teams were at all times aware that further roof falls or explosions might occur. It took 18 months to recover all the bodies from the pit.

== Investigation ==
A formal investigation of the causes and circumstances of the disaster was launched under section 83 of the Coal Mines Act 1911 (1 & 2 Geo. 5. c. 50). It was headed by William Walker CBE, acting Chief of His Majesty's Inspector of Mines (father of future Chief inspector of Mines Sir Henry Walker).

The inquiry opened at King's Hall, Stoke in December 1919. The jury returned the following verdict, after hearing witness evidence from 40 persons:

We consider that the deceased persons met their death from a medical point of view as follows,

144 from carbon monoxide poisoning

11 from violence plus carbon monoxide poisoning

The cause of death was an explosion of gas and coal dust in the Bullhurst and Banbury seams of the Minnie pit.

That there is not sufficient evidence to show what caused the initial flame.

We consider that the pit has been carried on in accordance with the Coal Mines Act 1911, and general regulations as far as they have been issued, but, we are of the opinion that, if the dust had been systematically removed, the explosion would not have been so extensive.

We do not consider that any particular person is to blame for the explosion.

As a result of the inquiry, we consider that further regulations should be issued at once for the treatment of coal dust. But we agree with the miners representatives, that nothing what so ever should be introduced, which will injure the miners, or young life in the mine and that there is great scope for inquiry by government experts on this point, particularly making coal dust itself inert.

The jury consider that any shot-lighter should report in writing anything he considers unsafe in the mine.

It appears that the workmen have not taken advantage of Section 16 of the Coal Mines Act, relative to the periodic inspection of the mines by workmen and we consider that they do so.

In summary, the jury concluded that no blame could be apportioned to any one individual but regulations should be issued for the treatment of coal dust. This was recommended because it was thought that the wholesale devastation of the mine was propagated by an abundance of dust.

== Aftermath ==
The disaster placed a huge strain on the mining community at Halmer End and its neighbouring villages because their livelihoods depended on the colliery and its related industries. With World War I entering its fourth year, many families had now lost men at home on the Western Front. The Miners Federation of Great Britain established a relief fund, 6s and 3d a week were collected from miners and boys at other pits around the country. Financial assistance came from other relief efforts. The Podmore company paid out compensation to bereaved families. Nevertheless, many families were forced into poverty due to the loss of their main wage earners.

In April 1930, the Minnie Pit along with the Podmore Hall Colliery closed at the start of the Great Depression. The company also shut down its foundry, railway, and iron-making plant. Thousands lost their jobs, sinking the area into a serious economic slump.

== Legacy ==
In the early 1980s the National Coal Board and the local council erected a memorial to the disaster. The inscription reads:

To the memory of those who lost their lives in the fight to extract coal from this mine, Minnie Pit, Halmerend, 1890–1931.

=== Bible ===
One of the victims of the disaster, a miner named Samuel Richardson, was a prominent member of the local Methodist chapel, and died with his Bible by his side. When his body was recovered, his Bible was returned to his wife, who gave it to his best friend. During a miners' strike in 1921, Samuel's Bible was to be sold in London to provide relief for the striking miners. The news of the sale came to the attention of Samuel's son, who bought the Bible back for one guinea. The bible is currently believed to be in the care of the descendants of Samuel Richardson.

== See also ==
- Miners (poem)
