= Listed buildings in Kings Bromley =

Kings Bromley is a civil parish in the district of Lichfield, Staffordshire, England. It contains 24 listed buildings that are recorded in the National Heritage List for England. Of these, one is at Grade I, the highest of the three grades, and the others are at Grade II, the lowest grade. The parish contains the village of Kings Bromley and the surrounding countryside. Most of the listed buildings are houses, cottages, farmhouses and farm buildings, many of which are timber framed or have timber framed cores, and some of the houses and cottages have thatched roofs. The Trent and Mersey Canal passes through the parish, and the listed buildings associated with it are two bridges, a lock, a lock keeper's cottage, and a milepost. The other listed buildings are a church, a churchyard cross, structures associated with a former manor house, and a war memorial.

== Key ==
Grade	Criteria
I	Buildings of exceptional interest, sometimes considered to be internationally important
II	Buildings of national importance and special interest

== Buildings ==
Name and location	Photograph	Date	Notes	Grade
All Saints Church; 52.75073°N 1.82056°W		Late 11th century	The oldest part of the church is the nave, the chancel and north aisle date from the 14th century, the tower from the 16th century, and the vestry and organ chamber from the 19th century. The church is built in sandstone and has roofs of tile and lead. It consists of a nave with a clerestory, a north aisle, a south porch, a chancel and a north vestry and organ chamber, and a west tower. The tower has three stages, diagonal buttresses, a west door, a three-light west window, and an embattled parapet with crocketed corner pinnacles.	I
Churchyard cross 52.75056°N 1.82052°W		14th century (probable)	The cross is in the churchyard of All Saints Church, and was restored in 1897. It is in stone, and consists of a cross on a 19th-century chamfered shaft, on a square base and four steps.	II
26 and 28 Alrewas Road; 52.74880°N 1.81876°W	—	16th century	A house altered and extended in the 18th and 19th centuries, and divided into two dwellings. It has a timber framed core, the outer walls replaced and the extensions in painted brick, and with a tile roof. There are two storeys and a single-storey outshut at the front. In the recessed right bay is a doorway with a bracketed canopy, and the windows are casements. Inside there is exposed timber framing.	II
2–10 Alrewas Road; 52.74888°N 1.82039°W		17th century	A row of five timber framed cottages with plaster infill and a tile roof. There are two storeys and five bays. The windows are casements, and inside is exposed timber framing.	II
13 Manor Road; 52.74874°N 1.82293°W	—	17th century	The cottage was altered and extended in the 20th century. It is timber framed with brick infill, some brick rebuilding, and a tile roof. There is one storey and an attic, originally with two bays, there were 20th-century extensions to the left and the rear. The windows are casements with latticed panes, and there is an attic dormer.	II
The Cot, 9 Alrewas Road; 52.74907°N 1.82047°W	—	Early 18th century	The remodelling of an earlier house, it is in red brick with a floor band and a tile roof. There are two storeys, and three bays, the left bay gabled and forming a cross-wing. In the right bay is a bay window, and the other windows are casements with segmental heads.	II
Former farmhouse, Hanch Hall Farm, Lichfield Road; 52.72306°N 1.84788°W	—	Early 18th century	The former farmhouse is in roughcast red brick with plaster quoins and a tile roof. There is one storey and an attic, and three bays. The doorway has a segmental head and an architrave, the windows are casements with segmental heads, and there is a gabled dormer.	II
Tuppenhurst Farmhouse, Tuppenhurst Lane; 52.73836°N 1.85529°W	—	18th century	The farmhouse was extended later and possibly has an earlier core. It is in red brick with a dentilled eaves band, and a tile roof. There are three storeys, two parallel ranges, and a front of three bays. In the centre is a porch and a doorway with a rectangular fanlight, to the left is a canted bay window with a flat roof, and the other windows are casements with segmental heads.	II
38 Manor Road; 52.74912°N 1.82426°W	—	18th century	A cottage in painted brick that has a thatched roof with a scalloped ridge. There is one storey and an attic, a storey band, and three bays. The windows are casements, with the thatch arched over the attic windows.	II
Church House, Church Lane; 52.75038°N 1.81985°W	—	Mid 18th century	A red brick house with a tile roof, three storeys, three bays, and rear wings forming three parallel ranges. In the centre is a porch, and the windows are casements with segmental heads.	II
Barn east of Church House; 52.75056°N 1.81948°W	—	Mid 18th century	The barn is a remodelling of a barn dating from the 15th or 16th century, and has a timber framed core with cruck construction. The outer walls have been rebuilt in red brick, and the roof is tiled. There is one storey, five bays, a central full-height entrance, and two tiers of ventilation slits. Inside there are four pairs of curved crucks.	II
Walls and pavilions, Manor Park; 52.74822°N 1.83099°W	—	18th century	The walls surround the former garden of a manor house, and are in red brick with stone coping. At the west end are two pavilions, each with a pedimented gable, the southern pavilions later incorporated in a house. The north wall has a central recess containing lean-to buildings, and in the east wall is a doorway with a segmental head.	II
Manor Farmhouse, Manor Road; 52.74881°N 1.82482°W	—	Mid 18th century	The farmhouse is in red brick with a dentilled eaves band and a tile roof. There are three storeys and three bays. The doorway has a bracketed hood, there is a bay window with a hipped roof, and the other windows are casements with segmental heads.	II
Manor Thatch and Miller's Thatch, 40 and 42 Manor Road; 52.74925°N 1.82451°W	—	18th century	A pair of remodelled cottages that have a timber framed core with cruck construction, the external walls replaced in painted brick. The roof is thatched with a scalloped ridge, there is one storey and an attic, and four bays. There are two porches with thatched roofs, the windows are casements with segmental heads, and the roof arches over attic dormers.	II
Dovecote south of Sunday's Well; 52.74875°N 1.82898°W	—	18th century	The dovecote is in red brick, and has a hipped tile roof with a wooden cupola and a ball finial. There is a hexagonal plan and two storeys, with a dentilled eaves band over an arched vault. To the northeast is a door, and there are casement windows with segmental heads in the upper storey. Inside are nesting boxes.	II
School House, Crawley Lane; 52.74770°N 1.82121°W	—	Late 18th century	A house, later a school, in red brick with an eaves band, and a hipped tile roof. There are two storeys, a U-shaped plan, and a front of three bays. The central doorway has panelled reveals, a rectangular fanlight and a flat hood. The windows on the front are casements with segmental heads, and elsewhere there are sash windows.	II
Bridge No. 53 and Woodend Lock, Trent and Mersey Canal; 52.71918°N 1.81211°W		Late 18th century	The bridge is an accommodation bridge over the canal. It is in red brick with sandstone arch jambs and parapet coping. The bridge consists of a single three-centred arch, with a plain parapet and abutments sweeping forward. The lock has 20th-century gates.	II
Bridge No. 56, Trent and Mersey Canal; 52.73764°N 1.85581°W		Late 18th century	The bridge carries Tuppenhurst Lane over the canal. It is in red brick with stone coping, and consists of a single segmental arch. The bridge has a humped back, and swept wings ending in piers at all four corners.	II
Woodend Lock Cottage, Trent and Mersey Canal; 52.71920°N 1.81231°W		Late 18th century	The lock keeper's house is in painted brick with an eaves band, and a tile roof. There are two storeys, four bays, casement windows, and an entrance in the left gable end.	II
Milepost at SK 1291 1335, Trent and Mersey Canal; 52.71723°N 1.80947°W		1819	The milepost on the towpath of the canal is in cast iron. It has a circular post, and a moulded head containing the distances in miles to Preston Brook and to Shardlow. On the shaft is the date and the initials of the manufacturer.	II
King's Bromley Stores, 1 Lichfield Road; 52.74877°N 1.82073°W	—	Early 19th century	A house, later a shop, incorporating part of a 14th-century roof. It is roughcast with a tile roof, and has two storeys and two bays. The central doorway has a segmental head, to the right is a plate glass shop window, and the other windows are casements with segmental heads.	II
Remains of King's Bromley Manor; 52.74889°N 1.82805°W	—	c. 1840	All that remains of the former manor house is a tower in red brick with stone dressings, rusticated corner pilasters, moulded storey bands, a modillion cornice, and a balustraded parapet with vase finials on the corners. There is a square plan and four stages. In the ground floor are semicircular arched recesses containing semicircular arched windows. In the third stage is a plaque with a keystone, and the top stage contains semicircular arched windows with moulded surrounds and keystones.	II
2–6 Manor Road; 52.74912°N 1.82134°W		c. 1850	A terrace of three cottages, originally almshouses, they are in red brick on a coped plinth, and have a patterned tile roof with moulded verges and tall chimney stacks. There is one storey and an attic, and three bays. Each cottage has a doorway, a window with two arched lights to the right, and a gabled dormer above.	II
War Memorial; 52.74878°N 1.82097°W		1922	The war memorial is an enclosure in a road junction in the centre of the village. It is in Cornish granite and sandstone, and mostly has a rough finish. The memorial consists of a cross on a stepped plinth, on a square base with four steps. On the memorial are inscribed panels.	II
