= Listed buildings in Audley Rural =

Audley Rural is a civil parish in the district of Newcastle-under-Lyme, Staffordshire, England. It contains 14 buildings that are recorded in the National Heritage List for England. Of these, one is listed at Grade II*, the middle of the three grades, and the others are at Grade II, the lowest grade. The parish contains villages, including Audley and Bignall End, and is otherwise rural. Most of the listed buildings are farmhouses, and the other listed buildings include a church, two watermills, a milepost, a memorial on a hill, a row of houses and shops, a church hall, and two war memorials.

== Key ==
Grade	Criteria
II*	Particularly important buildings of more than special interest
II	Buildings of national importance and special interest

== Buildings ==
Name and location	Photograph	Date	Notes	Grade
St James' Church; 53.05491°N 2.30147°W		c. 1300	The church was partly rebuilt and restored in 1846 by George Gilbert Scott, and is in Decorated style. It is built in sandstone with tile roofs, and consists of a nave with a clerestory, north and south aisles, a chancel and a west tower. The tower has four stages, angle buttresses, a west door with a pointed arch, a moulded cornice and a plain parapet with crocketed finials.	II*
Townhouse Farmhouse, wall and cottage 53.05909°N 2.30565°W	—	Late medieval (probable)	The farmhouse has a timber framed core, it is refaced in brick, and has a dentilled eaves band and a tile roof. There are two storeys and an attic, and an H-shaped plan, with a hall range of three bays, and gabled cross-wings. In the centre is a two-storey gabled porch, and the windows are casements with segmental heads. To the right is a brick wall linking to a 19th-century cottage that has one storey and an attic. and a doorway with a segmental head.	II
Hullock's Pool Farmhouse; 53.06471°N 2.29508°W		Mid 16th century	The farmhouse was later enlarged, and it was then re-cased in the 19th century. It is timber framed with plastered brick infill, there are applied timbers on the originals, and a tile roof. The farmhouse has one storey and an attic, and an L-shaped plan, consisting of a three-bay hall range, and a cross-wing with a cellar. On the garden front are three shallow bay windows, and three dormers, and the other windows are casements. Inside the farmhouse is an inglenook fireplace with a chamfered bressumer.	II
Miles Green Farmhouse; 53.04673°N 2.29200°W		17th century	The farmhouse has been altered and restored. It is timber framed with brick infill, some rebuilding in brick, and a tile roof. There are two storeys and three bays. Most of the windows are casements, and at the rear is a doorway with an ogee head.	II
Domvilles Farmhouse; 53.06172°N 2.33554°W	—	Early 18th century	The farmhouse is in red brick, with a moulded eaves cornice and a tile roof. There are three storeys, two parallel ranges, a front of five bays, and a two-storey extension recessed on the left. The windows in the lower two floors are sashes, and in the top floor they are casements.	II
Eardleyend Farmhouse; 53.07254°N 2.30460°W	—	Mid to late 18th century	A red brick farmhouse with storey bands, a moulded eaves band, and a tile roof. There are two storeys and a basement, two parallel ranges, and five bays. In the centre is a gabled porch, and the windows are sashes.	II
Audley Mill; 53.06753°N 2.31201°W		Early 19th century	The watermill is in red brick with a tile roof, two storeys and a loft. Steps lead up to a doorway, there is another doorway in the gable end, a fixed window and a casement window. Inside there is a wooden water wheel.	II
Boughey's Mill; 53.04848°N 2.33588°W	—	Early 19th century	A watermill that was later extended, it is in red and blue brick with a tile roof. There are three storeys and a projecting extension to the left. The mill contains doors and windows, and there is a beam at eaves level for a hoist. Inside, there is a cast iron overshot wheel, and to the south is a mill pool.	II
Milepost at NGR SK 805 510; 53.05616°N 2.29264°W		Early 19th century	The milepost is on the north side of New Road, Bignall End. It is in cast iron, and has a triangular plan, a chamfered face, and an segmental top. On the top is "TOWNSHIP OF AUDLEY", and on the side faces are the distances to Chesterton, Audley, Basford, and Nantwich.	II
Wedgwood Monument; 53.05808°N 2.26819°W		1839	The monument is on a hill and commemorates John Wedgwood. It is in stone, and consists of a square pedestal surmounted by an obelisk with a moulded base. The obelisk partly collapsed in 1976, and has been partly truncated. On the east side is an inscribed panel.	II
4–12 Church Street, Audley; 53.05536°N 2.30185°W		c. 1855	A row of houses and shops designed by William White in simple Gothic style. They are in red brick with some polychromy and tile roofs. There are two storeys and attics, and the row consists of four gabled units and a lower house recessed to the right. In the ground floor are entrances with pointed arches, and windows in recessed arches. In the upper floor and attics are casement windows with pointed tympani.	II
St James' Church Hall; 53.05511°N 2.30200°W		Late 19th century	The church hall and house are on a corner site, they are in red brick with tile roofs, and are in Gothic style. The hall stretches along Wilbraham's Walk, and has one storey and four bays, the third bay gabled. On the Church Street front, the first bay is the gable end of the hall, and contains a three-light window. The house to the right has two storeys and two bays, both bays gabled and the right bay projecting and larger. The lower storey of the left bay projects under a lean-to roof. There are two doorways with cambered heads, and most of the windows are mullioned.	II
Audley War Memorial; 53.05498°N 2.30192°W		1923	The war memorial is in an enclosure at a road junction. It is in granite, and consists of an obelisk on an octagonal base of four steps. On the base is a square plinth, and a tapering pedestal with a chamfered base and a cornice. The obelisk tapers, and has a moulded capstone surmounted by a palmette finial. On its front is a sword, a laurel wreath, and an inscription. On the pedestal are the names of those lost in the First World War, and the names of those lost in the Second World War are on the plinth.	II
Alsagers Bank War Memorial; 53.03650°N 2.29468°W		1924	The war memorial stands in an enclosure by the side of the road. It is in Hollington sandstone, and consists of an obelisk with a pyramidal cap, on a square tapering pedestal that has a cornice with egg and dart decoration and a moulded base. This stands on four steps and a concrete platform. On the obelisk are carvings in low-relief of laurel wreaths and rosettes. On the front of the obelisk, the front of the cornice, and on the pedestal are inscriptions and the names of those lost in the World Wars. The memorial is surrounded by stone posts linked by chains.	II
