= Listed buildings in Balterley =

Balterley is a civil parish in the district of Newcastle-under-Lyme, Staffordshire, England. It contains six buildings that are recorded in the National Heritage List for England. Of these, one is listed at Grade II*, the middle of the three grades, and the others are at Grade II, the lowest grade. The parish contains the village of Balterley and the surrounding countryside. The listed buildings consist of two houses, a farmhouse, a pigeon house, a milepost, and a church.

== Key ==
Grade	Criteria
II*	Particularly important buildings of more than special interest
II	Buildings of national importance and special interest

== Buildings ==
Name and location	Photograph	Date	Notes	Grade
The Beehive; 53.04067°N 2.37280°W	—	15th century (probable)	The house, which was extended in the 17th century, is timber framed with cruck construction, on a plinth of brick and stone, with painted brick infill and a tile roof. It has a T-shaped plan, consisting of a hall range with one storey and an attic, and a two-bay gabled cross-wing with two storeys and an attic. On the front is a gabled porch added in 1622, the windows are casements, and there is a gabled dormer. In the south gable end is an exposed cruck truss, and there is another pair of crucks internally.	II
Hall o' the Wood; 53.05061°N 2.34756°W		Late 16th century	A house, later remodelled, it is timber framed with plastered infill, some rebuilding in brick, and a stone tile roof. There are two storeys and an H-shaped plan, consisting of a hall range, gabled cross-wings, and gabled projection in the angles, and there is a further extension to the right. The ground floor of the projections contains twisted colonettes, and each storey is jettied. The windows are mullioned with moulded surrounds, and they contain casements.	II*
Balterley Hall; 53.04650°N 2.35364°W	—	Early 17th century (probable)	A farmhouse that was considerably remodelled in about 1870, it is in chequered red and blue brick on a sandstone plinth, with sandstone dressings and quoins, and a slate roof with coped shaped gables. There are three storeys and an attic, a south front of three bays, and a later two-storey two-bay wing to the right. In the ground floor are two three-light mullioned windows, and a doorway to the right. The other windows are casements with moulded sills and hood moulds.	II
Pigeon house, Buddileigh Farm; 53.04286°N 2.37213°W	—	18th century	The pigeon house is in red brick, and has a pyramidal tile roof surmounted by an octagonal cupola with a lead dome. It contains a doorway with a moulded architrave, and a window with a segmental head.	II
Milepost south-west of All Saints Church; 53.05008°N 2.35820°W		19th century	The milepost is on the north side of the B5500 road. It is in cast iron and has a triangular plan, a chamfered top with a round plate. On the top is "TOWNSHIP OF BALTERLEY", and on the sides are the distances to Audley, Chesterton, Gorsty Hill, Basford, and Nantwich.	II
All Saints Church; 53.05022°N 2.35769°W		1901	The church, designed by Austin and Paley in Gothic style, is built in red brick with stone dressings and a tile roof. It consists of a nave and a chancel in one unit, a northeast vestry, and a southwest porch. At the west end is a bellcote with a pedimented gable surmounted by a cross.	II
