= Bignall End =

Village in Staffordshire, England

Coordinates: 53.0575°N 2.2879°W

- Location within Staffordshire
- OS grid reference: SJ808511
- Civil parish: Audley Rural
- District: Newcastle-under-Lyme
- Shire county: Staffordshire
- Region: West Midlands
- Country: England
- Sovereign state: United Kingdom
- Post town: STOKE-ON-TRENT
- Postcode district: ST7
- Dialling code: 01782
- Police: Staffordshire
- Fire: Staffordshire
- Ambulance: West Midlands
- UK Parliament: Newcastle-under-Lyme

Bignall End is a village in Staffordshire, England, near Junction 16 of the M6 motorway.

== History ==
It is a part of the parish of Audley Rural, which comprises Audley, Bignall End, Wood Lane, Miles Green, Halmer End and Alsagers Bank.

There are two public houses, The Swan (or "the duck") on Chapel Street and the Plough on Ravens Lane. Bignall End Working Men's Club was demolished and had residential accommodation built on it. Audley Football Club is also in Bignall End.

In 1851, Bignall End was described as having "a number of scattered houses and cottages, one mile E of Audley, and several collieries".

In January 1895, an inrush of water into Audley Colliery resulted in the deaths of 77 miners.

== Cricket ==
Three England cricketers, Jack Ikin, Bob Taylor and Kim Barnett have played for Bignall End Cricket Club

== See also ==
- Listed buildings in Audley Rural
