= North Staffordshire Coalfield =

Coal mining region in England

Coordinates: 53.01°N 2.19°W

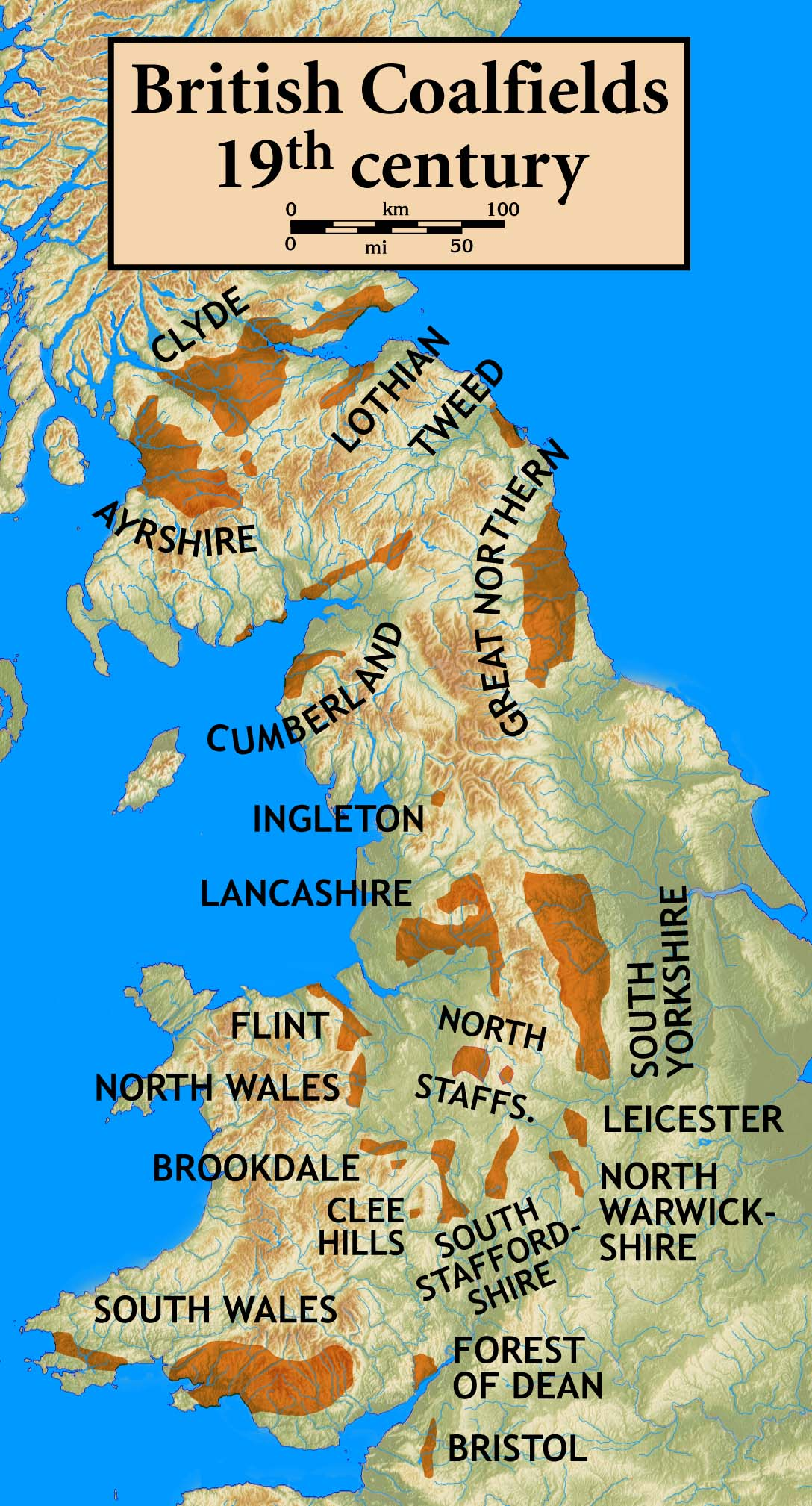

The North Staffordshire Coalfield was a coalfield in Staffordshire, England, with an area of nearly 100 square miles (260 km^{2}), virtually all of it within the city of Stoke on Trent and the borough of Newcastle-under-Lyme, apart from three smaller coalfields, Shaffalong and Goldsitch Moss Coalfields near Leek and the Cheadle Coalfield. Coal mining in North Staffordshire began early in the 13th century, but the industry grew during the Industrial Revolution when coal mined in North Staffordshire was used in the local Potteries ceramics and iron industry (ironstone deposits were also found with the coal in certain areas).

Before the First World War, 20,000 men worked in the industry and over 50 pits were in operation. After nationalisation in 1947, the industry was gradually reduced in size as smaller pits closed or merged with larger, more modern mines. The industry began its final decline after the 1984-85 miners' strike and the last deep mine, Silverdale, closed on Christmas Eve 1998.

== Geology ==
The superficial geology in this area predominantly consists of Devensian glacial tills, which overlie the Middle and Upper Pennine Coal Measures; the same sequences of sandstones, mudstones and coal seams as forms the impressive coalfields of Lancashire. The North Staffordshire Coalfield is a compact and heavily faulted coalfield, which is triangular and troughed like a saucer in its shape. However, for its relatively small size it has an amazing number and variety of workable seams.

Seams within the Middle Coal Measures
- Winghay
- Rowhurst
- Burnwood
- Moss
- Five Feet
- Yard
- Ragman
- Hams
- Bellringer
- Ten Feet
- Bowling Alley
- Holly Lane
- Hard Mine

Seams within the Lower Coal Measures
- Banbury
- Cockshead
- Bullhurst
- Winpenny
- Diamond
- Brights
- King
- Crabtree
- Two Feet

== History ==
Coal and ironstone were being dug in the Stoke-on-Trent and North Staffordshire area as early as 1282, and by 1467 the Great Row coal seam was being mined and used for firing pottery. The actual area within which the coal is exposed at the surface is 70 square miles (180 km^{2}), which is small compared to other coalfields, but along the central part of this the thickness of the seams is much greater than that of any other English coalfield except Lancashire.

The coal industry gradually expanded due to demand from the pottery and iron industry. It was also due to the establishment of the new transport system, canals (1777) and later railways (1837).

The coalfield's worst-ever loss of life occurred on 12 January 1918, when 155 men and boys died in the Minnie Pit Disaster.

The coal industry went from private small owners to big group iron-master owners, to nationalisation in 1947, until the last deep mine (Silverdale) was closed in December 1998.

Most former colliery sites have since been reclaimed. Chatterley Whitfield, bordering Chell Heath, which was the first UK mine to produce more than 1 million tons of coal per annum, closed in 1976. Two years later it was reopened as a museum, dedicated to the local industrial heritage. This closed in 1991 and the site was declared a local nature reserve, and a scheduled monument by English Heritage in 1993.

The Phoenix Trust, an independent not-for-profit foundation, is campaigning to turn the North Staffordshire Coalfield into a World Heritage Site due to its historic economic significance, leading role in the industrial revolution and role as the birthplace of Primitive Methodism.

== Incidents ==
- 7 February 1881 - Chatterley Whitfield Colliery Disaster
- 14 January 1895 - Diglake Colliery Disaster
- 12 January 1918 - Minnie Pit Disaster
- 2 July 1937 - Holditch Colliery Disaster
- 1 January 1942 - Sneyd Colliery Disaster
