= All Saints Church, Balterley =

Coordinates: 53.0502°N 2.3577°W

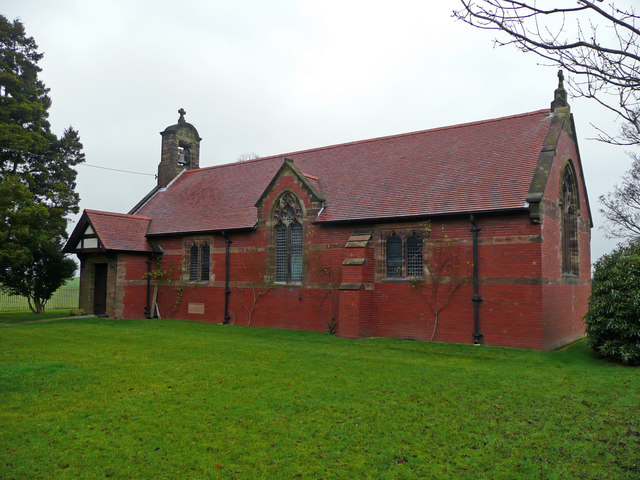
- All Saints Church, Balterley, from the southeast

- Location in Staffordshire
- OS grid reference: SJ 761 504
- Location: Balterley, Staffordshire
- Country: England
- Denomination: Anglican
- Website: All Saints Memorial Church, Balterley

History
- Status: Parish church

Architecture
- Functional status: Active
- Heritage designation: Grade II
- Designated: 22 April 1988
- Architect: Austin and Paley
- Architectural type: Church
- Style: Gothic Revival
- Completed: 1901

Specifications
- Materials: Brick with stone dressings Tiled roofs

Administration
- Province: York
- Diocese: Chester
- Archdeaconry: Macclesfield
- Deanery: Congleton
- Parish: Barthomley

Clergy
- Rector: Revd Canon Darrel Craven Speedy

All Saints Church is in the village of Balterley, Staffordshire, England. It is an active Anglican parish church in the deanery of Congleton, the archdeaconry of Macclesfield, and the diocese of Chester. Its benefice is united with that of St Bertoline, Barthomley. The church is recorded in the National Heritage List for England as a designated Grade II listed building.

== History ==
The church was built in 1901 to a design by the Lancaster firm of architects Austin and Paley.

== Architecture ==
All Saints is constructed in brick with ashlar dressings, and has a red tiled roof. Its architectural style is Gothic Revival. The plan consists of a two-bay nave and a single-bay chancel in a single cell, a northeast vestry, a southwest porch, and a bellcote at the west end. Buttresses externally mark the division between the nave and the chancel. Along the sides of the church are three two-light windows. The lateral windows have square heads. The central windows are taller, and rise through the eaves forming dormers; they contain Decorated-style tracery. The east window has three lights with Perpendicular tracery. On the north side of the vestry is a three-light window and a door. The bellcote has a gable surmounted by a cross finial.

Inside the church, the octagonal font is in marble with a small wooden cover. The wooden pulpit is also octagonal. The reredos is panelled, and is decorated with shields.

== See also ==
- Listed buildings in Balterley
- List of ecclesiastical works by Austin and Paley (1895–1914)
