= Audley and Bignall End =

Coordinates: 53.0514°N 2.2827°W

Audley and Bignall End was a ward in the Borough of Newcastle-under-Lyme, in the county of Staffordshire, England. It covered the villages of Audley and Bignall End. According to the 2011 Census it had a population of 5,927. In 2018 it was combined with part of Halmerend to form Audley ward.
