= Red Street =

Village in Staffordshire, England

Coordinates: 53.055°N 2.2529°W

- Location within Staffordshire
- OS grid reference: SJ827512
- District: Newcastle-under-Lyme
- Shire county: Staffordshire
- Region: West Midlands
- Country: England
- Sovereign state: United Kingdom
- Post town: Newcastle
- Postcode district: ST5 7
- Dialling code: 01782
- Police: Staffordshire
- Fire: Staffordshire
- Ambulance: West Midlands
- UK Parliament: Newcastle-under-Lyme

Red Street is a small, semi-rural village in the borough of Newcastle-under-Lyme, Staffordshire 6 miles (9.7 km) north west of Stoke-on-Trent, 2 miles (3.2 km) east of the neighbouring village of Audley and 1 mile (1.7 km) north of Chesterton.

Local amenities include a pub, community centre, butchers shop, church and primary school.

== Wedgwood Monument ==
Red Street is home to a large stone monument on the summit of Bignall Hill, which is dedicated to John Wedgwood (1760-1839). Wedgwood's monument was initially an obelisk erected in 1850. Following storm damage in 1976 it was reduced to a quarter of its original size, although the base is still substantial. The monument is a Grade II listed building. The monument is today reachable by footpaths off Deans Lane, and is the highest point in the area. It affords sweeping 360-degree views: south to the city of Stoke-on-Trent; north across the Cheshire Plains to Jodrell Bank; east to Mow Cop Castle and the Peak District; and west to the mountains of North Wales and Snowdonia.

== Sport ==
The village has its own football club Redstreet FC.
