= Miners (poem) =

1918 poem by Wilfred Owen

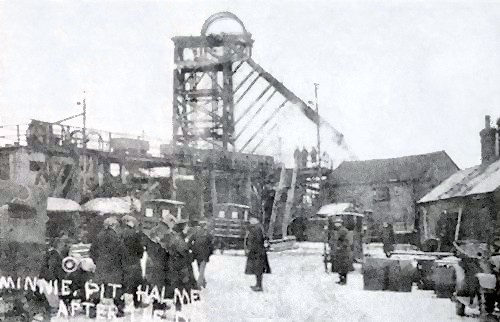
The Minnie Pit in Staffordshire, scene of the colliery disaster which occasioned Owen's poem

"Miners" is a poem by Wilfred Owen. He wrote the poem in Scarborough in January 1918, a few weeks after leaving Craiglockhart War Hospital where he had been recovering from a shell-shock. Owen wrote the poem in direct response to the Minnie Pit Disaster in which 156 people (155 miners, 1 rescue worker) died.

== Background ==
After his discharge from Craiglockhart and a short spell of leave, Owen rejoined his army unit (the 3/5th battalion the Manchester Regiment) in Scarborough. While his men were in stationed at Burniston Road Barracks a mile north-west of the town, Owen and other officers were billeted in the Clarence Gardens (now the Clifton) Hotel; Owen was the mess secretary. Owen had a unique room in the hotel: he occupied the five-windowed turret on the 5th floor, directly overlooking the sea.

He wrote Miners in under an hour in response to the Minnie Pit Disaster of 12 January 1918, in which 156 men and boys lost their lives as a result of a firedamp explosion, including 40 pit-lads under 16. Owen was unusually well-acquainted (for someone with a grammar school education) with working-class miner types. Aged nineteen, he had met a Northumberland pit-lad who made a particular impression on him at a nonconformist convention in Keswick in 1912. Also, many of the men in his platoon had worked down the Lancashire pits before the war: in 1916, Owen had described his men as

"hard-handed, hard-headed miners, dogged, loutish, ugly. (But I would trust them to advance under fire and to hold their trench;) blond, coarse, ungainly, strong, 'unfatiguable', unlovely, Lancashire soldiers, Saxons to the bone.

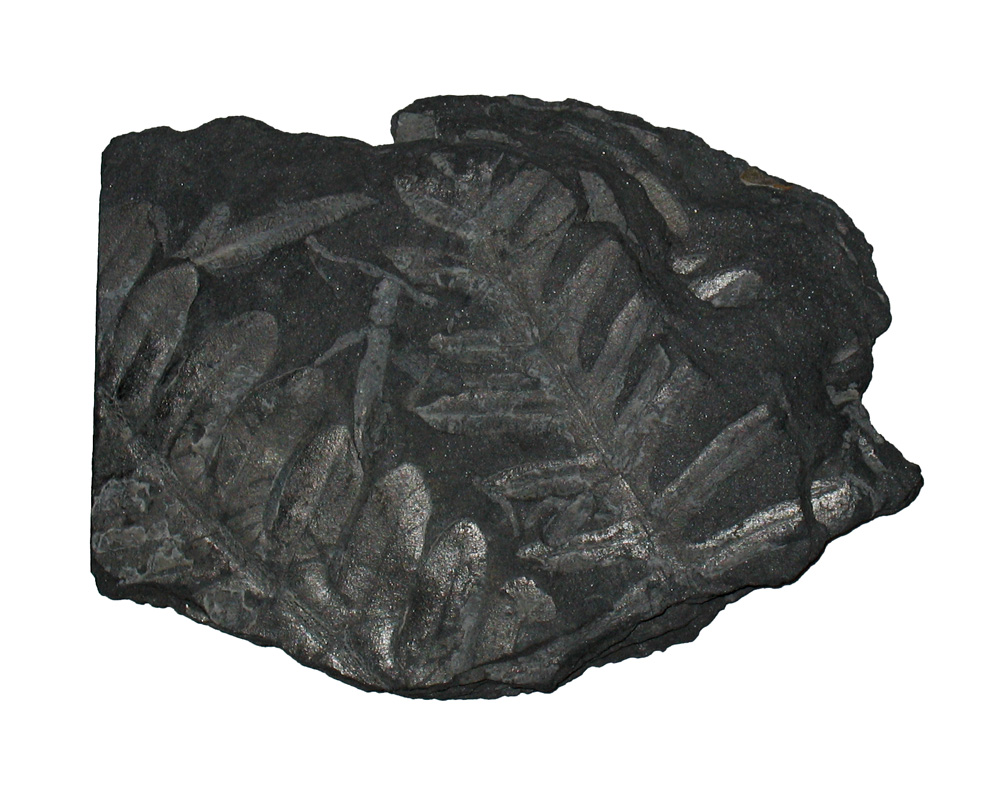
Fern fossil in coal

In addition, Owen was a keen geologist who had collected rocks and minerals since his youth, and in Miners he uses phrases like "smothered ferns" and "frond-forests", redolent of the imprints of fossil plants in coal.

== Poem ==
The opening stanzas evoke the poet gazing into the fire imagining a primeval forest older than myth, "before the fauns". But his traumatic experiences on the Western Front intrude on his somewhat romantic meditation: "Wrote a poem on the Colliery Disaster: but I get mixed up with the War at the end. It is short, but oh! sour." The gently hissing coals recall the moans of the dying miners "writhing for air"; Owen intertwines their deaths with those of soldiers at the front, imagining charred bodies reduced to ash. Owen laments that though people over the coming years will live on peacefully and doze by fires, their coals will have been formed of the toils of the dead soldiers and miners, now buried under the earth and forgotten.

For a projected volume of his work, Owen gave the poem the subtitle: How the future will forget the dead in war.

There was a whispering in my hearth,
A sigh of the coal,
Grown wistful of a former earth
It might recall.

I listened for a tale of leaves
And smothered ferns,
Frond-forests, and the low sly lives
Before the fauns.

My fire might show steam-phantoms simmer
From Time's old cauldron,
Before the birds made nests in summer,
Or men had children.

But the coals were murmuring of their mine,
And moans down there
Of boys that slept wry sleep, and men
Writhing for air.

And I saw white bones in the cinder-shard,
Bones without number.
Many the muscled bodies charred,
And few remember.

I thought of all that worked dark pits
Of war, and died
Digging the rock where Death reputes
Peace lies indeed.

Comforted years will sit soft-chaired,
In rooms of amber;
The years will stretch their hands, well-cheered
By our life's ember;

The centuries will burn rich loads
With which we groaned,
Whose warmth shall lull their dreaming lids,
While songs are crooned;
But they will not dream of us poor lads,
Left in the ground.

== Publication ==
Owen sent the poem to The Nation in the evening of the day he finished it. The proofs arrived while Owen was preparing to attend Robert Graves' wedding (on 23 January at St. James's Church, Piccadilly).

Miners was published on 26 January 1918, one of only five poems by Owen published in his lifetime. (Note: The four other poems by Owen which appeared in print during his lifetime were Song of Songs and The Next War published in The Hydra, and Hospital Barge and Futility published in The Nation, 15 June 1918.) The cheque arrived on 14 February. Owen, in one of his many letters to his mother, said he was "satisfied with the Two Guineas that half-hour's work brought me."

== Sources ==
- Bell, John, ed. (1985). Wilfred Owen: Selected Letters (revised ed.). Oxford University Press. ISBN 978-0-19-281914-7.
- Blunden, Edmund, ed. (1967). The Poetry of Wilfred Owen. London: Chatto & Windus.
- Farley, Paul (10 November 2006). "Wilfred Owen: Journey to the Trenches". The Independent.
- Gibson, John (2001). "Mother's boy and stationmaster's son". In Quinn, Patrick J.; Trout, Steven (eds.). The Literature of the Great War reconsidered: beyond modern memory. Basingstoke: Palgrave Macmillan. ISBN 978-0-333-76459-6.
- Hibberd, Dominic (2003). Wilfred Owen: a new biography. Lanham, MD: Ivan R. Dee. ISBN 978-1-56663-487-8.
- Kerr, Douglas (1994). The Works of Wilfred Owen. Ware, Hertfordshire: Wordsworth Editions. ISBN 978-1-85326-423-8.
- Owen, Harold; Bell, John, eds. (1967). Wilfred Owen: Collected Letters. Oxford University Press.
- Stallworthy, Jon, ed. (1983). Wilfred Owen: The complete poems and fragments. Vol. I: The poems. London: Chatto & Windus, Hogarth Press, Oxford University Press. ISBN 0-7011-2716-3.
