= Draycott in the Clay =

Village in Staffordshire, England

Coordinates: 52.854°N 1.770°W

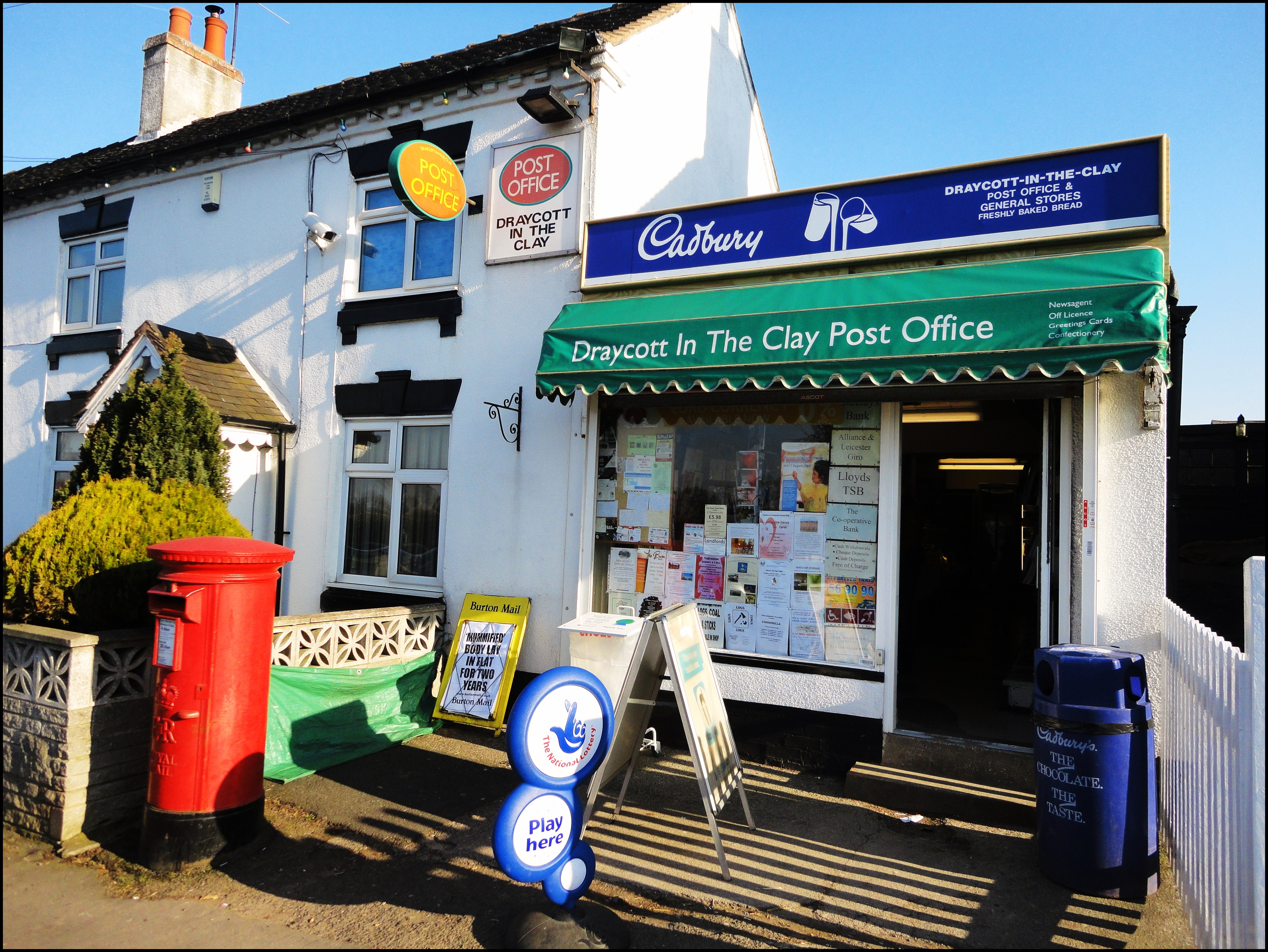
- The village Post office

- Location within Staffordshire
- Population: 862 (2011)
- OS grid reference: SK 156 285
- Civil parish: Draycott in the Clay
- District: East Staffordshire
- Shire county: Staffordshire
- Region: West Midlands
- Country: England
- Sovereign state: United Kingdom
- Post town: Ashbourne
- Postcode district: DE6
- Dialling code: 01283
- Police: Staffordshire
- Fire: Staffordshire
- Ambulance: West Midlands
- UK Parliament: Burton

Draycott in the Clay is a village and civil parish within the English county of Staffordshire. The population of the village was 845 at the 2021 census.

== Location ==
The village is located between Uttoxeter, which is 7.6 miles (12.2 km) to the west, and Burton Upon Trent which is 7.5 miles (12.1 km) to the east. The nearest railway station is at Uttoxeter. The village is dominated by the A515 which runs through the village. To the south of the village is The National Forest and to the north is a traction engine park, North Staffs and Cheshire Traction Engine Club, Klondyke Mill.

== Village Facilities ==
The village has two churches, a village shop/Post Office, two public houses, one school, a play area and is the site of North Staffs and Cheshire Traction Engine Club.

== See also ==
- Listed buildings in Draycott in the Clay
