= Above Church =

Hamlet in Staffordshire, England

Coordinates: 53°03′00″N 01°58′30″W

Above Church is a hamlet about 0.6 kilometers (0.4 mi) northwest of Ipstones in the English county of Staffordshire. It is located at grid reference SK016504.
