= Longdon, Staffordshire =

Village in Staffordshire, England

Coordinates: 52.725965°N 1.883872°W

Longdon
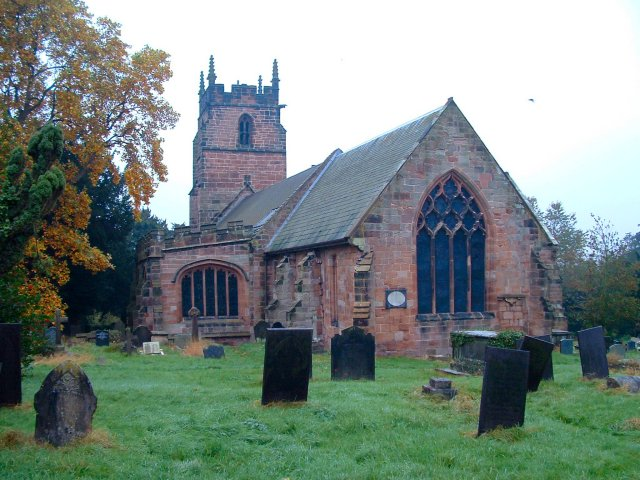
- Church of St James the Great

- Location within Staffordshire
- Population: 1,505 (2011)
- OS grid reference: SK080145
- Civil parish: Longdon
- District: Lichfield
- Shire county: Staffordshire
- Region: West Midlands
- Country: England
- Sovereign state: United Kingdom
- Post town: RUGELEY
- Postcode district: WS15
- Dialling code: 01543
- Police: Staffordshire
- Fire: Staffordshire
- Ambulance: West Midlands
- UK Parliament: Lichfield

Longdon is a village and civil parish in the District of Lichfield, Staffordshire, England.

== Location ==
The village is situated midway between the town of Rugeley 3.7 miles (6.0 km) and city of Lichfield 4.3 miles (6.9 km) . The parish also includes the nearby villages of Upper Longdon, Longdon Green and Gentleshaw.

At the 2001 census, the population of the parish was 1,472. The 2011 census recorded the population of Longdon ward as 1,505.

== Notable people ==
- Thomas Orme (ca.1637 in Hanch Hall - 1716), Member of Parliament (MP) for Lichfield in 1685.
- Samuel Stretton (1731–1811), builder and architect, built the first powered cotton mill.
- John Alexander (1736–1765), nonconformist minister and writer.

== See also ==
- Listed buildings in Longdon, Staffordshire
