= Upper Longdon =

Village in Staffordshire, England

Coordinates: 52.729167°N 1.911111°W

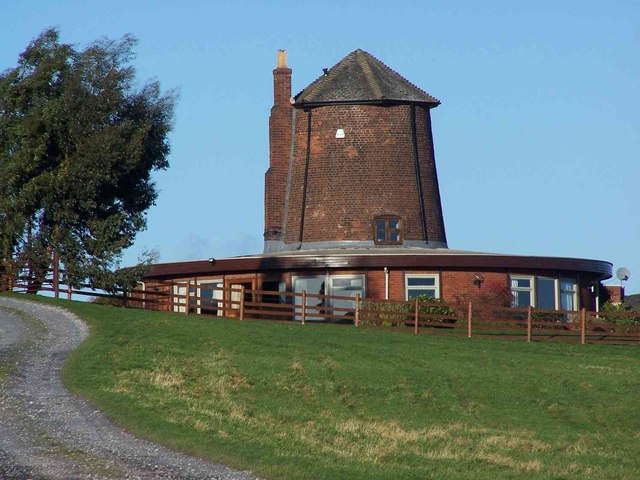
- Windmill Cottage

- Location within Staffordshire
- OS grid reference: SK060145
- Civil parish: Longdon
- District: Lichfield
- Shire county: Staffordshire
- Region: West Midlands
- Country: England
- Sovereign state: United Kingdom
- Post town: RUGELEY
- Postcode district: WS15
- Dialling code: 01543
- Police: Staffordshire
- Fire: Staffordshire
- Ambulance: West Midlands
- UK Parliament: Lichfield

Upper Longdon is a village within the civil parish of Longdon and is in the District of Lichfield of the English county of Staffordshire.

== Location ==
The village is 2.1 miles (3.4 km) west of the village of Longdon and sits on the edge of The Chase. The town of Rugeley is 3.4 miles (5.5 km) to the north of the village. Lichfield is located 6.1 miles to the south.

== Facilities ==
The village has one public house called the Chetwynd Arms located in the centre of the village on Upper Way.

== Notable Features ==
There is one listed building within the village called the Gables. The building is a pair of cottages thought to have been built around 1840. One of the outstanding features of the cottages are the ornamental fretted gable end barge boards.

== See also ==
- Listed buildings in Longdon, Staffordshire
