= Kings Bromley =

Village in Staffordshire, England

Coordinates: 52.750°N 1.821°W

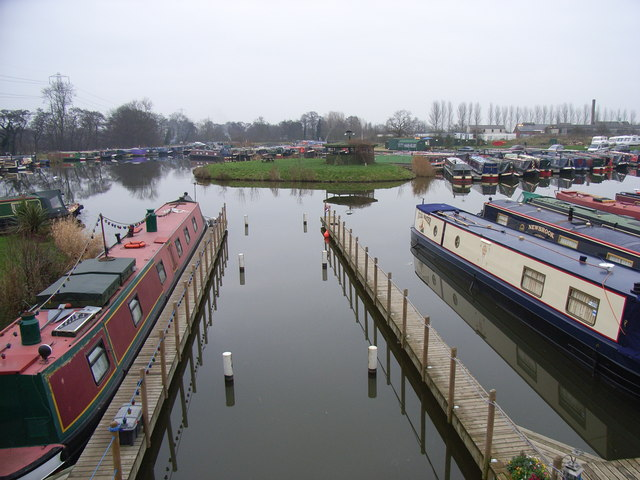
- The Marina

- Location within Staffordshire
- Population: 1,163 (2011)
- OS grid reference: SK122169
- Civil parish: Kings Bromley
- District: Lichfield
- Shire county: Staffordshire
- Region: West Midlands
- Country: England
- Sovereign state: United Kingdom
- Post town: Burton-on-Trent
- Postcode district: DE13
- Dialling code: 01543
- Police: Staffordshire
- Fire: Staffordshire
- Ambulance: West Midlands
- UK Parliament: Lichfield
- Website: kingsbromley-pc.gov.uk

Kings Bromley or King's Bromley is a village and civil parish in the Lichfield district of Staffordshire, England, about 4 miles (6 km) north of Lichfield on the A515 road. The population as of the 2011 census was measured at 1,163.

== History ==
The parish was in Offlow Hundred.

The Norman village church, which dates back to at least 1170, is named All Saints.

The manor was anciently called Brom Legge, and derived its present name from the circumstances of its being the property of the Crown for nearly two centuries after the Norman Conquest, previous to which it had been distinguished as the residence of the Earls of Mercia. Leofric, the husband of the famous Lady Godiva, died here in 1057. Henry III granted the manor to the Corbetts, who sold it, in 1569, to Francis Agard, of Ireland. About 1670 it was sold by Charles Agard to John Newton, of the island of Barbados, and in 1794 it was bequeathed by Sarah Newton to her cousins, John and Thomas Lane. South of Kings Bromley at Bromley Hayes is a marina on the Trent and Mersey Canal.

== Spelling ==
The name of the village and parish seems to be spelled with or without the apostrophe fairly indiscriminately. Both King's Bromley and Kings Bromley are seen in official documents – the village's own website favours Kings Bromley.

== Sport ==
Kings Bromley has a long-standing football club "Kings Bromley Swifts" which has images dating back as far as 1903. In recent years "The Swifts" have played their football in the Burton Sunday League Division 1 but were promoted to the Premier Division in 2011/2012. Home games are played at Crawley Lane opposite Kings Bromley Cricket Club on the show field.

== See also ==
- Listed buildings in Kings Bromley
