= Scot Hay =

Hamlet in Staffordshire, England

Coordinates: 53.0246227°N 2.3002903°W

- Location within Staffordshire
- OS grid reference: SJ794467
- District: Newcastle-under-Lyme
- Shire county: Staffordshire
- Region: West Midlands
- Country: England
- Sovereign state: United Kingdom
- Post town: Newcastle
- Postcode district: ST5
- Dialling code: 01782
- Police: Staffordshire
- Fire: Staffordshire
- Ambulance: West Midlands
- UK Parliament: Newcastle-under-Lyme

Scot Hay is a hamlet located outside the town of Newcastle-under-lyme, Staffordshire, England. It is located near Keele University and also the villages of Silverdale and Keele

The village cricket team rejoined the weekend Stone and District League in 2016 after an absence of ten years.
