= Miles Green =

Village in Staffordshire, England

Coordinates: 53.0467°N 2.2971°W

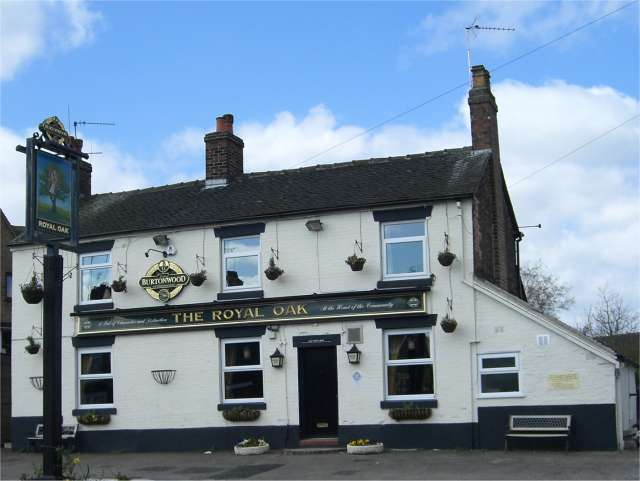

- Location within Staffordshire
- Area: 0.2571 km^{2} (0.0993 sq mi)
- Population: 865 (2021 census)
  - Density: 3,364/km^{2} (8,710/sq mi)
- OS grid reference: SJ801499
- Civil parish: Audley Rural
- District: Newcastle-under-Lyme
- Shire county: Staffordshire
- Region: West Midlands
- Country: England
- Sovereign state: United Kingdom
- Post town: Stoke-on-Trent
- Postcode district: ST7
- Dialling code: 01782
- Police: Staffordshire
- Fire: Staffordshire
- Ambulance: West Midlands
- UK Parliament: Newcastle-under-Lyme

Miles Green is a village in the civil parish of Audley Rural, in the Newcastle-under-Lyme district, in the county of Staffordshire, England and is about 5 miles (8 km) north west of Stoke-on-Trent. In 2021 it had a population of 865.

== Miles Green Statistics ==
=== Owner & Rental Statistics ===
Miles Green has a higher rate of home ownership, either outright or via a mortgage than the national average, which suggests that Miles Green is a relatively affluent area. Approximately 35.2% of people living in Miles Green own their own house, compared to 30.6% in England. In addition, 33.9% have a mortgage on their home while only 0.4% share a home. Renting of houses in Miles Green consists of only 18.8% shared renting and only 10.5% private or other renting.

=== Miles Green General Health Statistics ===
The respondents of a Census were asked to rate their health. These are the results for Miles Green. The percentage of residents in Miles Green rating their health as 'very good' is less than the national average. Also the percentage of residents in Miles Green rating their health as 'very bad' is more than the national average, suggesting that the health of the residents of Miles Green is generally worse than in the average person in England. When it comes to health, 44.65% of residents reported very good health conditions, 34.48% good health conditions, and 14.37% reported fair health conditions while 5.10% and 1.40% reported bad and very bad health conditions, respectively.

=== Age Distribution Statistics ===
The population of Miles Green as a whole, is older than the national average. However, the population of Miles Green is younger than the Staffordshire average. Approximately 19.3% of residents in Miles Green are under the age of 18, while 18.2% are over the age of 65. 62.5% of residents are between those ages (ages 18–65). Miles Green also has a mean age of 40.8 and a median age of 41.

=== Benefits & Unemployment Statistics ===
These figures on the claiming of benefits in Miles Green come from the Department for Work & Pensions and are dated. They can often be a good indicator of the prosperity of the town and possible indicator of how hard it would be to get employment in the area. Approximately 2.6% of residents receive a jobseekers allowance only, while 2.7% receive incapacity benefits (such as IB or ESA), and 13.1% receive any benefit including in work benefits.
