= Halmer End =

Village in Staffordshire, England

Coordinates: 53.0375°N 2.301°W

- Location within Staffordshire
- OS grid reference: SJ799489
- District: Newcastle-under-Lyme
- Shire county: Staffordshire
- Region: West Midlands
- Country: England
- Sovereign state: United Kingdom
- Post town: STOKE-ON-TRENT
- Postcode district: ST7
- Dialling code: 01782
- Police: Staffordshire
- Fire: Staffordshire
- Ambulance: West Midlands
- UK Parliament: Newcastle-under-Lyme

Halmer End is a small village in the Borough of Newcastle-under-Lyme in Staffordshire, neighbouring the small hamlet of Alsagers Bank and the larger village of Audley.

Population details as taken in the 2011 census can be found under Audley Rural. The village is on the B5367.

Historically, the village was dominated by the Coal Mining Industry, and several large coal mines were in operation in the vicinity of the village in the 19th and early 20th centuries. However, the village is remembered as being the site of the worst mining disaster in the history of the North Staffordshire Coalfield when, in 1918, 156 men and boys were killed in the Minnie Pit Disaster.

Nowadays, the village remains semi-rural and residential with a school, convenience store and a Chinese takeaway.

== The Minnie Pit Disaster ==
The Minnie Pit was opened in 1881 and was part of the wider Podmore Hall Collieries, a large combine of pits in the Halmerend area that served the ironworks at nearby Apedale. The Minnie Pit was the Downcast Shaft for the Podmore Hall operations and was 360 yards deep, reaching five thick, profitable coal seams.

On 12 January 1918, a huge explosion tore through the workings and killed 156 men and boys, at a time as well when the Great War was in its fourth year. The pit never recovered from the disaster and closed in 1930, along with the entire workings of the Podmore Hall Collieries and Apedale Ironworks. Nowadays a monument records the terrible disaster that befell this small village in 1918.

The Minnie Pit Disaster is the subject of the Wilfred Owen poem "Miners," published in 1918.

== Transport ==
Halmer End was served by a railway station which was opened by the North Staffordshire Railway on 28 June 1880. It was situated on the NSR Audley to Alsager Line. The line closed completely in 1963 and much of it is now a footpath, but nothing much remains of the industry that it once served.

== Education ==
The village has one secondary school. Sir Thomas Boughey Academy was built in 1849 and is situated on Station Road. It teaches pupils aged 11–16.
