= Balterley =

Village in Staffordshire, England

Coordinates: 53.0498°N 2.356°W

- Location within Staffordshire
- Population: 221 (2011)
- OS grid reference: SJ762503
- District: Newcastle-under-Lyme
- Shire county: Staffordshire
- Region: West Midlands
- Country: England
- Sovereign state: United Kingdom
- Post town: Crewe
- Postcode district: CW2
- Dialling code: 01270
- Police: Staffordshire
- Fire: Staffordshire
- Ambulance: West Midlands
- UK Parliament: Newcastle-under-Lyme

Balterley is a village and civil parish in the borough of Newcastle-under-Lyme in Staffordshire, England. According to the 2001 census it had a population of 204, increasing to 221 at the 2011 census. The parish borders Cheshire to the north, and the village is about six miles south-east of Crewe in Cheshire.

Balterley originally was a township within the ancient parish of Barthomley, which mainly lay over the Staffordshire and Cheshire border in Cheshire. On the re-organisation of this ancient parish in 1866, the parish was formed, leaving Barthomley civil parish entirely in Cheshire. In 1965, there was a minor change in the county border of Staffordshire with Cheshire, with Balterley parish exchanging small areas of land with Weston civil parish (in the Cheshire East area). Additionally, some land was lost to Chorlton civil parish, also in Cheshire East.

== See also ==
- Listed buildings in Balterley
- All Saints Church, Balterley
- Gorsty Hill Farm
