= Alsagers Bank =

Village in Staffordshire, England

Coordinates: 53.0324°N 2.293°W

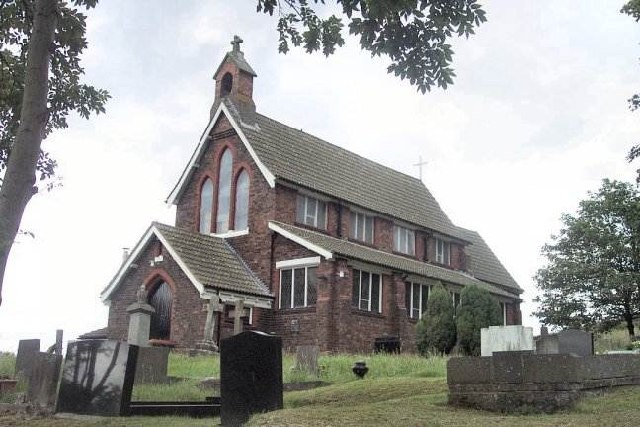
- St Johns Church, Alsagers Bank

- Location within Staffordshire
- OS grid reference: SJ804483
- District: Newcastle-under-Lyme
- Shire county: Staffordshire
- Region: West Midlands
- Country: England
- Sovereign state: United Kingdom
- Post town: Stoke-on-Trent
- Postcode district: ST7
- Dialling code: 01782
- Police: Staffordshire
- Fire: Staffordshire
- Ambulance: West Midlands
- UK Parliament: Newcastle-under-Lyme

Alsagers Bank is a village in the Borough of Newcastle-under-Lyme in Staffordshire. Population details at the 2011 census can be found under Audley Rural. It has a pub, The Gresley Arms, St John's Church (Church of England), a primary school, and a football club. There is a regular bus service through the village between Newcastle-under-Lyme and Audley.

The village bears no relationship to Alsager in Cheshire and its name is a derivation from the Alsager family who lived in the area.
