= Holditch =

Holditch may refer to:

- Holditch, a hamlet in Thorncombe, Dorset (formerly Devon), England
- Holditch (ward), in the Borough of Newcastle-under-Lyme, England
- Hamnet Holditch (1800-1867), English mathematician
- Philip Holditch (died c. 1608), English merchant and politician, MP for Totnes in 1601

== See also ==
- Holditch Colliery disaster, of 1937 in Staffordshire, England
- Holditch's theorem in plane geometry, named after Hamnet Holditch
