= Wolstanton Rural District =

Former local government area in the UK

Coordinates: 53.03°N 2.22°W

- History
  - Created: 1894
  - Abolished: 1904
  - Succeeded by: Wolstanton United Urban District; Newcastle-under-Lyme Municipal Borough; Smallthorne Urban District
- Status: Rural district

Wolstanton was a rural district in Staffordshire, England from 1894 to 1904. It was created by the Local Government Act 1894 based on Wolstanton rural sanitary district.

It was abolished in 1904 with the parishes being divided between successors. The parish of Goldenhill ultimately became part of the county borough of Stoke-on-Trent. The parishes of Kidsgrove and Newchapel became the Kidsgrove Urban District, which survived until 1974. Milton and Chell were added to the Smallthorne Urban District, which continued until 1922, then becoming part of Stoke-on-Trent. Wolstanton, Silverdale and Chesterton formed the Wolstanton United Urban District, which became part of Newcastle-under-Lyme Municipal Borough in 1932.
