= Audley Urban District =

Former local government area in the UK

Coordinates: 53.054°N 2.300°W

- Area
  - 1921: 8,313 acres (33.64 km^{2})
  - 1931: 8,313 acres (33.64 km^{2})
- Population
  - 1921: 14,738
  - 1931: 13,621
- History
  - Created: 1894
  - Abolished: 1932
  - Succeeded by: Newcastle-under-Lyme Rural District; Newcastle-under-Lyme Municipal Borough; Kidsgrove Urban District
- Status: Urban district

Audley Urban District is a former administrative unit in Staffordshire created by the Local Government Act 1894. It contained the civil parish of Audley. In 1932 it was abolished, being absorbed into the Newcastle-under-Lyme Municipal Borough, Newcastle-under-Lyme Rural District and Kidsgrove Urban District.
