= Chesterton, Staffordshire =

Former mining village in Staffordshire, England

Coordinates: 53.0424°N 2.2509°W

Chesterton
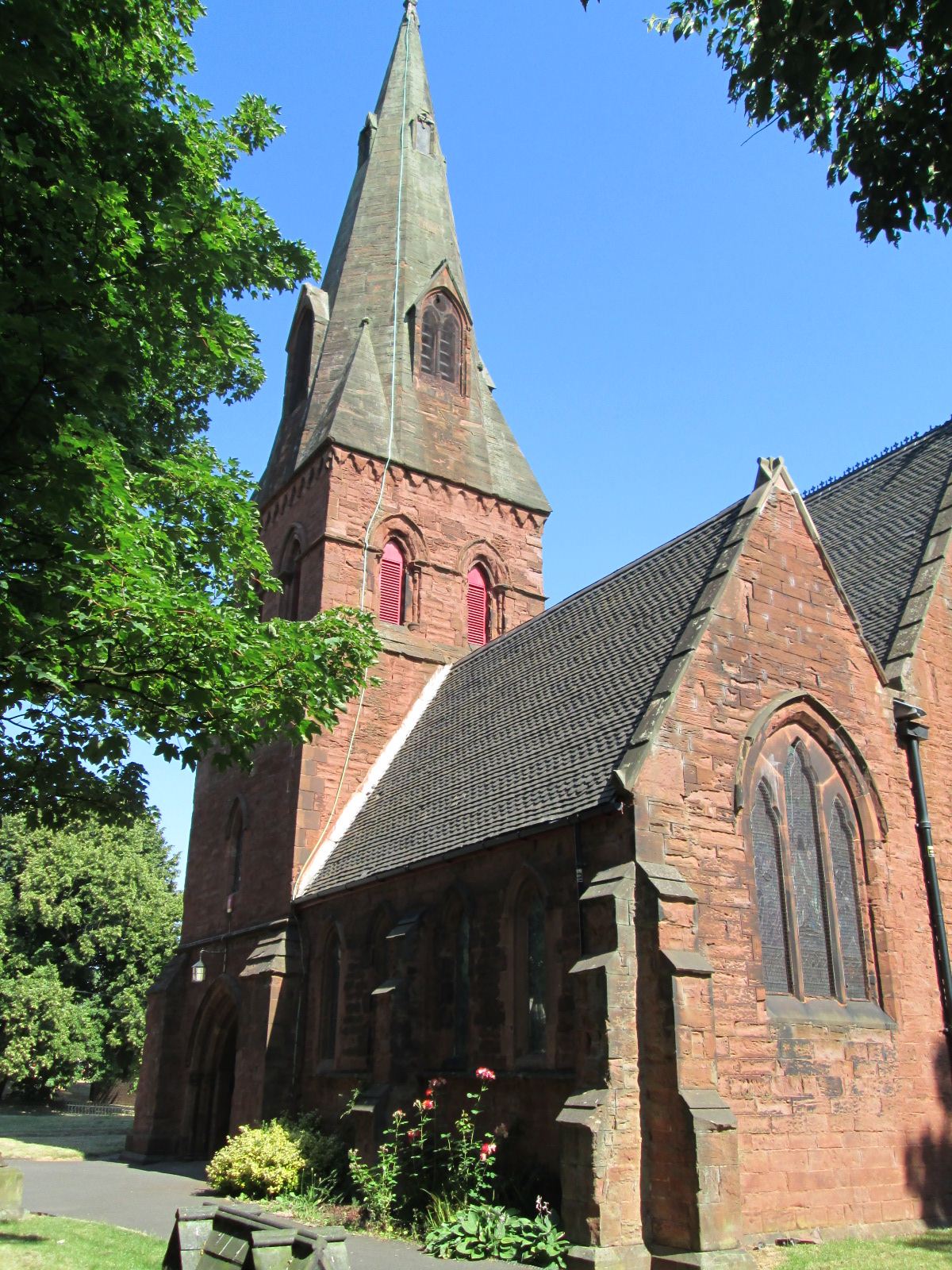
- Holy Trinity Church

- Location within Staffordshire
- Population: 7,421 (2011 census)
- OS grid reference: SJ832494
- District: Newcastle-under-Lyme
- Shire county: Staffordshire
- Region: West Midlands
- Country: England
- Sovereign state: United Kingdom
- Post town: Newcastle
- Postcode district: ST5
- Dialling code: 01782
- Police: Staffordshire
- Fire: Staffordshire
- Ambulance: West Midlands
- UK Parliament: Newcastle-under-Lyme

Chesterton is a former mining village on the edge of Newcastle-under-Lyme, in the Newcastle-under-Lyme district, in Staffordshire, England.

Chesterton is the second largest individual ward in the Borough of Newcastle-under-Lyme. In the 2011 census, Chesterton's population stood at 7,421.

== History ==
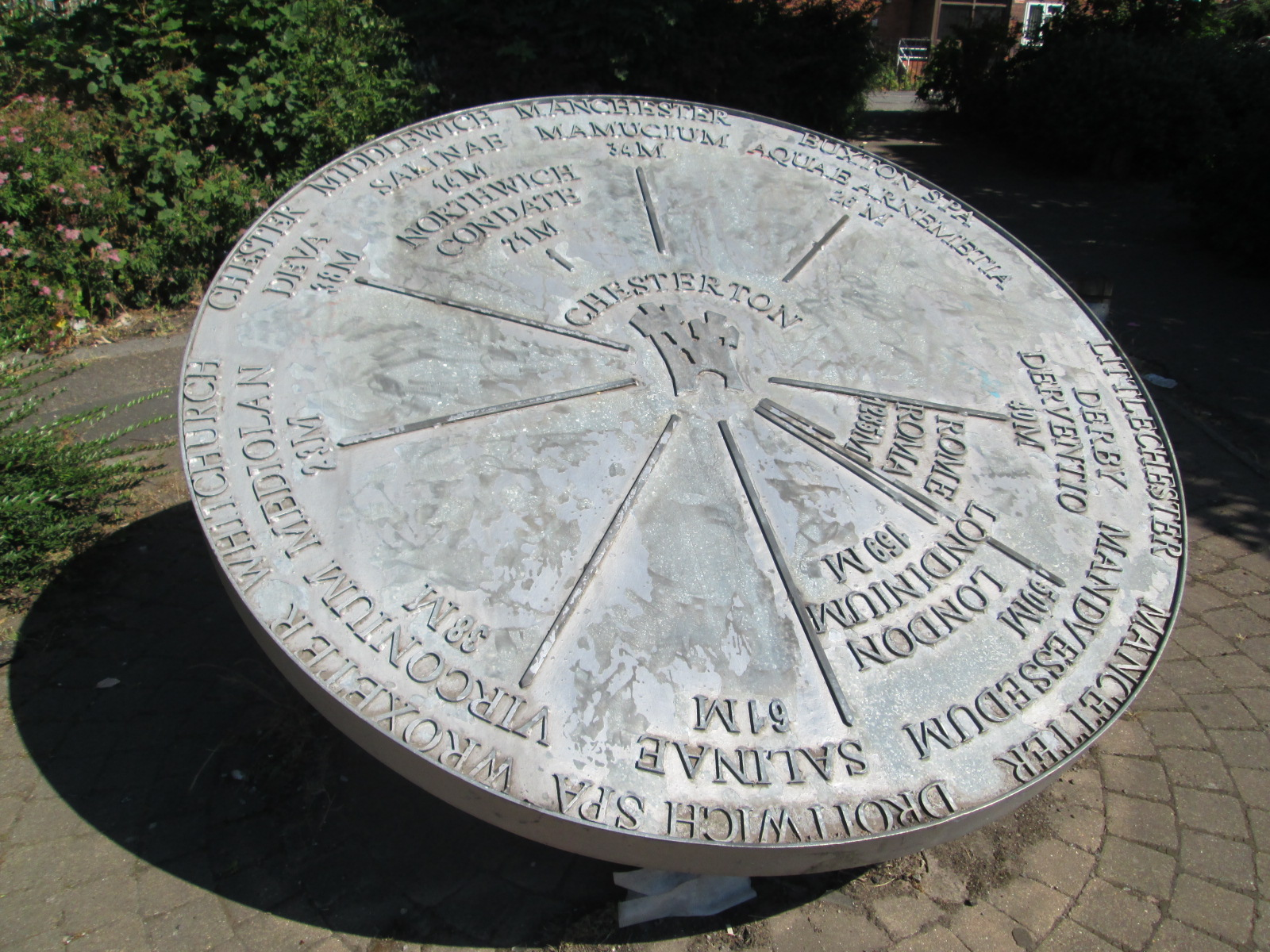
Monument showing the distance from Chesterton to other Roman settlements

=== Roman Chesterton ===
Chesterton was the site of a Roman fort, built on an area now occupied by Chesterton Community Sports College. There is little indication of how long the fort was in use but it is believed to have been constructed in the late 1st Century AD. A vicus was built at nearby Holditch, where it is believed that some inhabitants may have mined for coal.

There have been various excavations at the site. Excavations in 1895 revealed the fort's vallum, fosse (moat) and parts of the east and west defensive structures. Later excavations in 1969 uncovered further sections of the eastern ramparts.

=== Later history ===
Chesterton was formerly a township in Wolstanton parish and chapelry in Wolstanton and Audley parishes, on 31 December Chesterton became a parish in its own right, it was in the Wolstanton Rural District from 1894 to 1904. Following that, it became part of the Wolstanton United Urban District until 1932, when it was added to the Borough of Newcastle-under-Lyme. On 1 April 1932 the parish was abolished and merged with Newcastle-under-Lyme. In 1931 the parish had a population of 6861. The main employer in Chesterton was Holditch Colliery. The colliery employed 1,500 men and mined ironstone in addition to coal. Despite heavy investment in the 1960s and 1970s the colliery closed down in 1988, just three years after the end of the year-long miners' strike. Many of the miners transferred to nearby Silverdale Colliery, which itself closed down on Christmas Eve 1998. The current site of Holditch Colliery is now a large business park.

==== Holditch Colliery disaster ====
The Holditch Colliery disaster was a coal mining accident occurring on 2 July 1937 at the Holditch Colliery, which at one point was the main employer in the village. In total, 30 men died and eight were injured. An investigation was conducted into the incident. The original fire was concluded to have originated in the coal cutting machine and was due to frictional heat produced by the picks in the cut with subsequent explosions being caused by firedamp. The investigation concluded that the rescue plans were insufficient and adopted to save costs at the expense of lives. Today a memorial stands to the victims at Apedale Heritage Centre.

== Education ==
There are four primary schools in the village: Churchfields Primary, Chesterton Primary, Crackley Bank Primary and St.Chad's Primary; and one Secondary school: Chesterton Community Sports College. Collective Vision Trust was established which includes the high school and three of the primary schools in the village with Rob Swindells becoming the CEO across the trust. Churchfields primary is the largest of the schools with over 350 children on role and is two form entry. The headteacher, Diane Beardsmore began as a high school teacher and then moved to be headteacher in 2012. Chesterton primary is a smaller than average primary school with the headteacher Helen Swindells. Crackley Bank shares an Executive Headteacher with Bursley Academy - a role filled by Sara Stevenson, the previous Headteacher at Crackley. All of the schools are inclusive in nature and have a high proportion of SEN and pupil premium. This inclusive nature is continued by the high school which is now led by Steph Waterhouse.

== Religion ==
Chesterton is home to five churches: Holy Trinity C of E Church, Elim Pentecostal Church, St Johns the Evangelist Church, Chesterton United Reform Church, and St Chad's Church.

== Places of interest ==
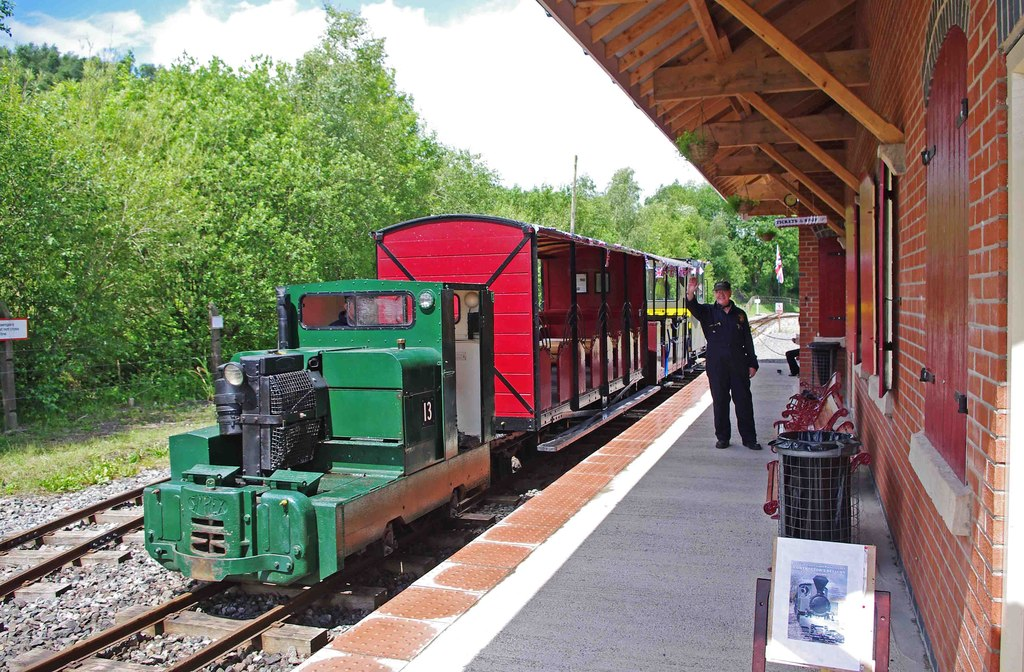
Train at Apedale Valley Light Railway station, Apedale Country Park, near Chesterton

- Apedale Community Country Park
- Apedale Heritage Centre
- Moseley Railway Trust

== Notable people ==
- Jackie Trent (1940–2015) singer & songwriter
- Roger Johnson (born 1969), TV journalist, newsreader and presenter on BBC North West Tonight

=== Sport ===
- Arthur Turner (1909–1994) football player and manager, played 357 games
- Ken Downing (1917–2004) motor racing driver
- Frank Bowyer (1922–1999) footballer, played 512 games
- Mike Pejic (born 1950) footballer, played 360 games and 4 for England
- Tony Loska (born 1950) footballer, played 372 games
- Ian Moores (1954–1998) footballer, played 359 games
- Mel Pejic (born 1959) footballer, played 518 games
- Aaron Ramsdale (born 1998) footballer, played 180 games and 4 for England

== See also ==
- Listed buildings in Newcastle-under-Lyme
