= Apedale Community Country Park =

Country park in Staffordshire, England

Coordinates: 53.032317°N 2.270933°W

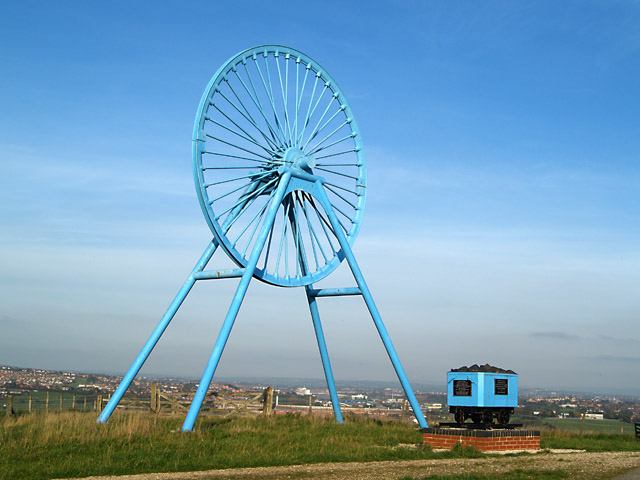
Pit head wheel and coal tub at Apedale Country Park: memorial dedicated to the mine workers of Staffordshire.

Apedale Community Country Park is a 454-acre (184 ha) country park in the borough of Newcastle-under-Lyme, Staffordshire, England. The park is unusual for the area as it was previously an opencast mine.

The area has a long history of mining, with the nearby former collieries at Silverdale and Holditch also having been redeveloped for other uses.

The shallow mine at Holditch was redeveloped into a business park and an industrial estate, which led to significant capital gains for Staffordshire County Council. The amelioration of the park was part paid for out of these receipts.

Within the park is the Apedale Heritage Centre. The adjoining Moseley Railway Trust is currently running the first phase of the 2 ft (610 mm) narrow gauge Apedale Valley Light Railway extending further into the parkland. There is a series of tracks, waymarked routes and self-guided trails.

The country park is also the home of Newcastle Countryside Project and is bordered by the communities of Silverdale, Chesterton, Knutton and Cross Heath.
