= Newchapel, Staffordshire =

Village in Staffordshire, England

Coordinates: 53.0885°N 2.2058°W

Newchapel
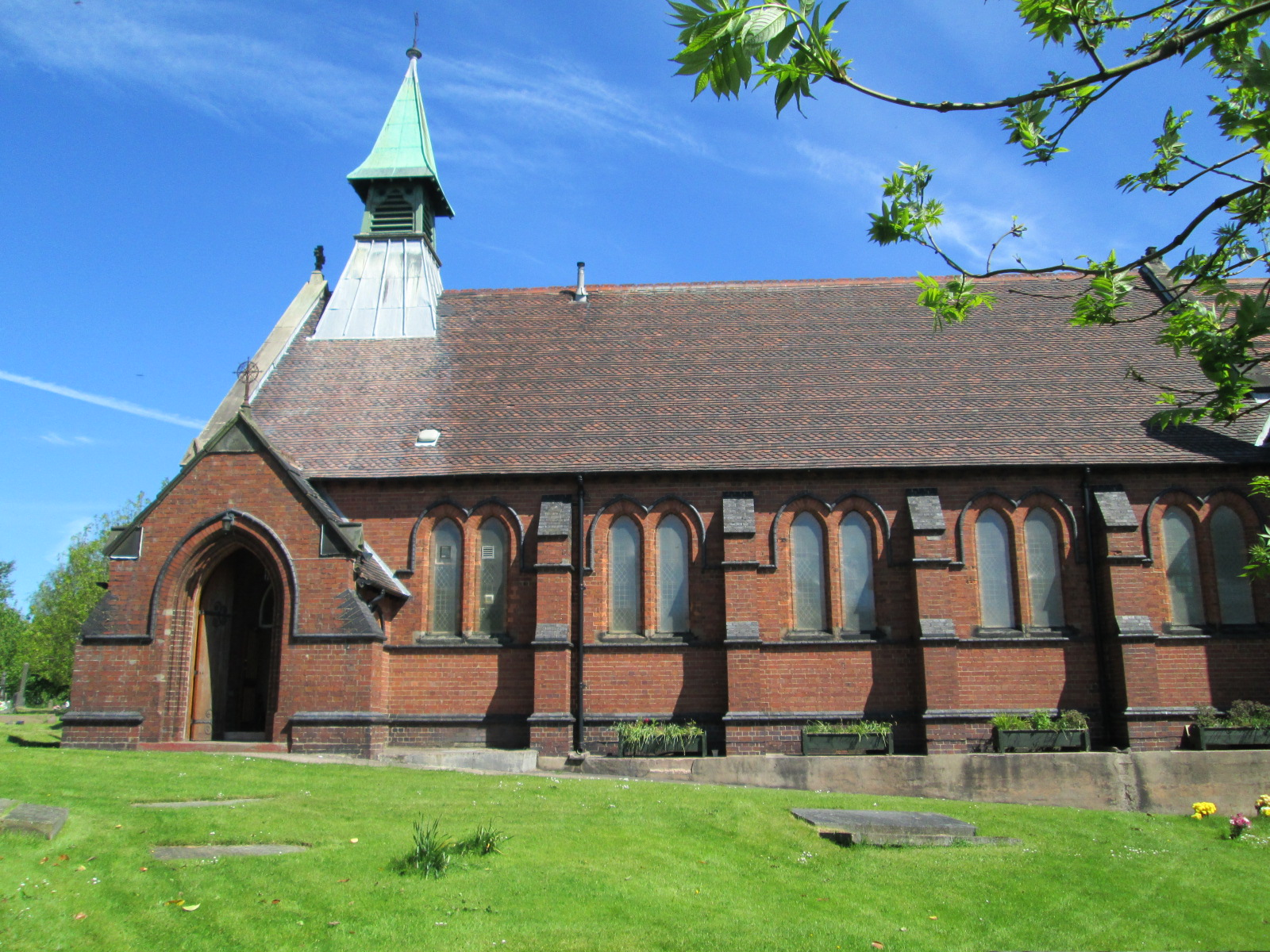
- St James' Church, Newchapel

- Location within Staffordshire
- OS grid reference: SJ863546
- Civil parish: Kidsgrove
- District: Newcastle-under-Lyme
- Shire county: Staffordshire
- Region: West Midlands
- Country: England
- Sovereign state: United Kingdom
- Post town: STOKE-ON-TRENT
- Postcode district: ST7
- Dialling code: 01782
- Police: Staffordshire
- Fire: Staffordshire
- Ambulance: West Midlands
- UK Parliament: Staffordshire Moorlands

Newchapel is a village and former civil parish, now in the parish of Kidsgrove, in the Newcastle-under-Lyme district, in the county of Staffordshire, England. In 1951 the parish had a population of 4135.

Newchapel was originally named Thursfield. It was mentioned in the Domesday Book in 1086 as Turvoldesfeld. After the Reformation in the 17th century the land reverted to private ownership, the new owner built a stone Chapel and the village was renamed Newchapel.

Thursfield was formerly a chapelry in the parish of Wolstanton, On 31 December 1894 it became a civil parish in its own right. From 1894 to 1904 Newchapel formed part of Wolstanton Rural District. After re-organisation of boundaries, from 1904 to 1974 it was part of Kidsgrove Urban District; following the Local Government Act 1972, on 1 April 1974 it was absorbed and became part of the parish of Kidsgrove in the Borough of Newcastle-under-Lyme.

Newchapel was served by a railway station (shared with Goldenhill), Newchapel and Goldenhill on the Potteries Loop, which was opened by the North Staffordshire Railway on 1 October 1874 and closed on 2 March 1964.

The canal engineer James Brindley (1716 – 27 September 1772) died at his Turnhurst estate in Newchapel, within sight of his unfinished Harecastle Tunnel. On 30 September 1772, just nine days after the completion of his Birmingham Canal, he was buried in the churchyard of Newchapel; the present church, St. James, is dedicated to his memory. The grave is marked by a bronze plaque.

During the excavation work for the first Harecastle Tunnel, large amounts of coal were discovered underground. This led to the development, initially by the Duke of Bridgewater and then by Robert Heath and Sons of a significant mining and coal by-products works known as Birchenwood. Growing from the Birchenwood Colliery Company founded in 1893, this was the largest industrial site that the Newchapel area has ever known and provided employment for several thousand people in its heyday. Newchapel as seen today was born as a result of the success of Birchenwood, and the first houses built were to provide homes for the workers and their families.

Newchapel is also home to the Natural Sciences Centre established in 1967. It houses an observatory, planetarium, exhibition centre and wildlife areas. In 2010, after the death of one of its founders (Michael Pace), the site fell into disrepair with only minimal maintenance work being carried out. In 2024 the director Miles Palmer appealed to local community champion Matthew Wright (Tesco Kidsgrove) and work began to renovate the site: clearing rubbish and brambles and rebuilding the observatory. They were joined in July 2025 by James Albinson, astronomer from Keele Observatory. Shortly after other volunteers came to support and the group Friends of Newchapel Observatory was formed.

== Notable People from Newchapel ==
- Hugh Henshall (1734–1816), civil engineer noted for his work on canals
