= Turnhurst =

Coordinates: 53°4′45″N 2°12′6″W

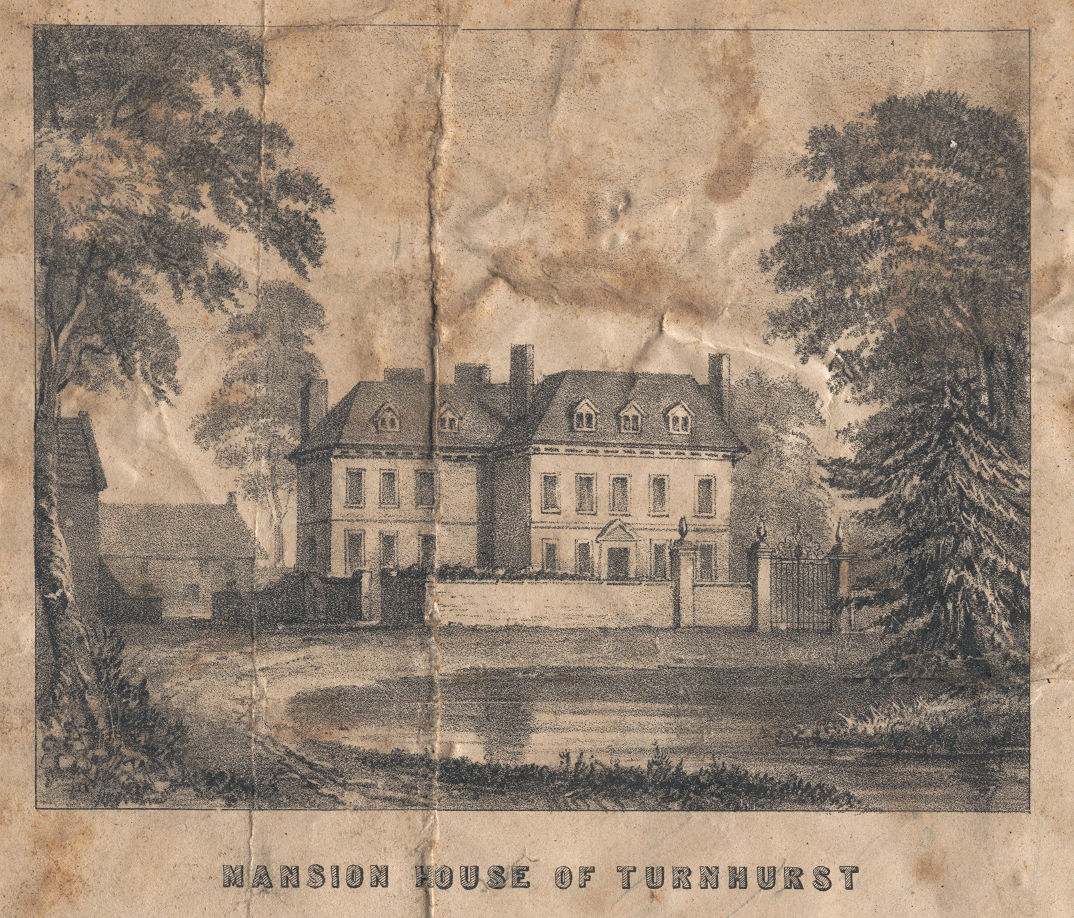
Turnhurst Hall c1847

Map showing the location of Turnhurst within Staffordshire.

Turnhurst Hall was a substantial house which stood in an area of what is now Stoke-on-Trent, Staffordshire, England, between Great Chell and the hamlet of Newchapel in Newcastle-under-Lyme. The road linking the two settlements is now known as Turnhurst Road and the area where the former estate was located is now known as Turnhurst.

The most famous resident was canal pioneer James Brindley who is said to have perfected models of his canal locks in the grounds of the house. The estate was originally used for farming, but was later mined for coal and iron ore.

== Early history ==
=== Etymology ===
Turnhurst means "estate on the wooded hill", (from Old English, tun means "enclosure, farm or estate" and hurst means "wooded hill").

=== Description ===
Turnhurst Hall was a substantial house built around 1700 on the site of a former dwelling set in 110 acres (0.45 km^{2}) of farmland. Never a great or wealthy country seat, Turnhurst is described as being typical of the houses of lesser gentry. A comfortable, roomy, old-fashioned dwelling which was said to have been the last house in England in which a family fool was maintained.

The Hall was divided into two residences from the time of the Alsagers ownership as documented dates of residence confirm. This fact has caused some confusion to historians dating occupancy.

=== Earliest References ===
The earliest record known is from the 1539 General Muster Roll of Henry VIII which lists a William Rowley of Turnhurste indicating that there was a residence at the site before the Hall was built. A number of writers refer to still earlier occupation of Turnhurst, but no primary records support this as fact.

== Residents of Turnhurst ==
=== Rowley ===
The Rowley family was seated at Turnhurst in ancient times and first appears in parish registers in 1626.

=== Bellot ===
Four members of the Bellot family took the title baronet of Moreton in the 17th and early 18th centuries. Sir Thomas Bellot 2nd Bt and Sir John Bellot 3rd Bt were Members of Parliament for Newcastle-under-Lyme. On the death of the 3rd Bt, his brother Thomas took the title of 4th Bt. The last Sir Thomas Bellot was a keen sportsman and panels of several of the upper rooms depicted some of his exploits in the field.

=== Bowyer ===
The Bowyer family features in legal documents relating to Turnhurst between 1690 and 1740. In particular a 1690 marriage settlement for Katherine Bowyer who married into the Rowley family at Turnhurst. Mentioned in the settlement are Rowley, Bellot and Sir John Bowyer of Knypersley. Deeds to the estate show occupancy by John Bowyer and Francis Egerton in 1752.

=== Alsager ===
The first reference to Alsager appears in 1672 with the marriage of Ralph Alsager to Sarah Rowley of Turnhurst. In 1752 the Turnhurst estate was purchased outright, in trust for Mary Alsager. Mary Alsager was to own the estate for the period of Brindley's occupation, and following her death in 1795 was managed by trustees until 1846.

=== Cole ===
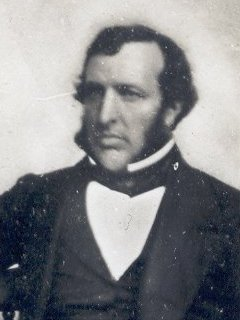
Edward Cole of Turnhurst 1803-1853.

John Cole and Barbara Scott moved to Turnhurst after their marriage in 1745. Cole was a farmer who bred prize winning longhorn cattle on the estate. The Coles were tenants of Mary Alsager alongside James Brindley and were granted a lease in 1766 for 21 years. Further leases survive detailing the Cole tenancy into the 19th century.

Civil records improved in the mid-19th century and many references to the Coles at Turnhurst are available. The 1841 Census shows Benjamin Cole and his family in residence and by the 1851 Census it was Edward Cole who occupied the Hall. In 1849 John Hilditch Cole, son of Edward, was born at Turnhurst. Edward Cole died in 1856 and the Coles finally left Turnhurst and moved to Ford Green Hall, then owned by Robert Heath of Kidsgrove who was the brother of Edward's widow.

=== James Brindley ===
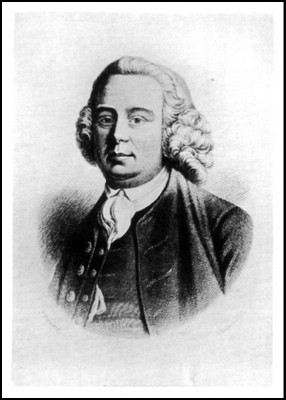
James Brindley.

James Brindley was a pioneering canal engineer and the most notable resident of Turnhurst.

Although Mary Alsager did not routinely occupy the Hall, in the original lease to the Coles she did retain an option to occupy significant parts of the Hall. Such an option effectively sub-divided the residence and it was the half of the Hall which Mary Alsager reserved that James Brindley occupied.

Brindley married his young bride, Ann Henshall, in 1765 and together they moved into Turnhurst Hall where he was to live until his death in 1772. Brindley mixed with some of the finest minds in England during this time as his friend Josiah Wedgwood introduced him to the eminent physician and polymath Erasmus Darwin and other illustrious members of the Lunar Circle.

Erasmus Darwin attended Brindley at Turnhurst towards the end of his life and diagnosed his advanced diabetes mellitus. Brindley died at Turnhurst Hall on 27 September 1772. Following Brindley's death, Darwin wrote to Wedgwood to suggest that a memorial to Brindley be erected in Westminster Abbey.

== Demise of Turnhurst Hall ==
During the 19th century large parts of Staffordshire were extensively mined. The Turnhurst estate overlay a rich geology and the rural country seat gave way to the commercial demands for its mineral bounty. In 1862 the estate was sold for auction and its mineral resources listed. The sale catalogue included geological sections through the estate and listed 16 mines producing coal and iron ore, as well as deposits of clay, marl and sand. The Hall suffered subsidence towards the turn of the 20th century and was finally demolished in 1929.

== Brindley's Lock ==
Local tradition maintains that James Brindley built a model canal lock at Turnhurst and late 19th century newspaper articles even describe the canal as being present on the estate. A linear feature with the appearance of a canal section had been identified on 19th century estate plans. In 1993 an archaeological excavation revealed the canal with a sluice gate built into the southern end wall.

Examination of the find led to the conclusion that it was most likely a water feature contemporary with the Hall and pre-dated Brindley's residence. However it was possible that modifications had been made in the late 18th century, including the addition of the sluice, and the feature may have served as a water holding tank for canal experiments.

== Turnhurst today ==
The Turnhurst estate is now the site of a modern housing development. The Hall itself was near to where the eastern end of Silverstone Crescent now joins Turnhurst Road, and the water feature long thought to have been Brindley's canal lies beneath a protective concrete raft under the car park of the aptly named The Brindley Lock public house. The pub has since been demolished and is to be turned into a housing development.

== See also ==
- James Brindley
- Newcastle-under-Lyme, Stoke-on-Trent, Staffordshire
- Canal
- History of the British canal system
- Waterways in the United Kingdom
- Erasmus Darwin
- Lunar Society
- Josiah Wedgwood
