= Holditch Colliery disaster =

1937 coal mining accident in England

Coordinates: 53°01′51″N 2°14′52″W

- Date: 2 July 1937
- Time: 05:45 GMT
- Location: Holditch Colliery, Staffordshire, England
- Also known as: Brymbo Colliery
- Deaths: 30
- Injuries: 8

The Holditch Colliery disaster was a coal mining accident on 2 July 1937, in Chesterton, Staffordshire, England, in which 30 men died and eight were injured. It was caused by a fire and subsequent explosions, and was exacerbated by a decision from management to risk the lives of mine workers to try to save the coal seam.

== The colliery ==
Archaeologists believe that the area itself was mined as long ago as Roman times.

Holditch Colliery, also known as Brymbo Colliery, opened in 1912, and was one of a number of coal mines in Staffordshire. It was located around two miles north west of Newcastle-under-Lyme. Formerly the main employer in Chesterton, the colliery employed 1,500 men and mined ironstone in addition to coal. With varying amounts of coal coming out of the colliery per year, in 1947 it hit 400,000 tonnes. In many ways an old-fashioned mine, steam power was in some form used up until 1980. It was believed to have been the most gassy colliery in Britain. The colliery consisted of two 2,000 feet deep shafts, sunk in 1912 and 1916, working Great Row and the Four Feet seams.

Despite heavy investment in the 1960s and 1970s the colliery closed down in 1990, just three years after the end of the year long miners' strike. Just before its closure it was taking out over 500,000 tonnes of coal a year. Many of the miners transferred to nearby Silverdale Colliery, which itself closed down on Christmas Eve 1998. The current site of Holditch Colliery is now a large business park.

== Disaster ==
At around 5:45 am on 2 July 1937, two coal cutter men (Herman Payne and William Beardmore) were working when Beardmore noticed a flame. The flame spread quickly across the coalface into a deadly wall of fire. The two men quickly fled and actually survived the disaster which was about to strike.

Of the 55 men working in the vicinity of the fire, all but two managed to escape (W.Hystead and Arthur Stanton). The two men became lost in the smoke, which eventually overcame them. The remaining 53 men attempted in vain to extinguish the fire, with the timber supports ablaze and threatening roof collapse, the overman ordered the stone dust to be dumped and spread about as near to the fire as possible. These efforts also proved futile and so the men retreated further back and took a roll call – revealing the absence of Hystead and Stanton. By now the fire had taken hold and the two men were feared lost.

Whilst the men were fighting a losing battle against the fire, day shift officials, who had been informed of the fire, arrived on the scene. One of these men, H.Bentley, ordered a night shift ripper, John Hassell, to meet him at the right hand gate. Here an explosion occurred at around 6:50, leaving Bentley with burns and killing Hassell. Bentley recruited collier E.Beech to help him search for Hassell, but they failed to find him.

"After my examination in the morning my mind was made up that those three men were dead. I do see they could have possibly have been alive from the atmosphere I saw."

— Davies believed the three missing men to be dead, but Hystead somehow made it out alive.

Explosions occurring in the mine, a full evacuation was ordered. By around 7:10 the men met in the main crut. The manager ordered for stoppings to be put on in the cruts, and sand, stone and dust was brought in for this purpose. Ten minutes later the night-shift workers were sent home, as the day-shift workers began work on the stoppings. The management team began inspecting the mine to decide upon a further course of action. Mr. Cocks, the managing director, ordered that the location of the stoppings be changed, despite disagreement from his team. This proved to be a fatal decision, as the new location was in unsettled ground. The original plan by Mr.Davies, was to put two stopping dams in solid ground, and would allow for easy transportation of materials at a distance of less than 500 yards from the pit bottom. The revised plan Mr.Cocks ordered meant erecting three such dams in unstable ground, also providing air to the fire, and requiring a travelling distance of 1,300 yards for essential tools and equipment. The reason taken for this new plan was to save the coal seam.

"This change in the original plan of the manager was a vital matter, resulting, as it did, in the large death toll."

— Inspector Mr.F.H. Wynne finds that the change of plan was fatal to the men.

By now 9:00, two government inspectors, Mr.Finney and Mr. Bloor, arrived on the scene, joining Davies at the pit bottom. Ten minutes later a sixth explosion occurred, though the 35 men who were in the mine continued in their work, along with the three missing men believed to be lost. Shortly before 10:10 a seventh small explosion occurred, followed by an eighth, and deadly blast. The eighth explosion had sent men working 1,000 yards away to the ground, reversing the ventilation system, and killing thirty men, badly burning the remaining eight.

=== Men who lost their lives ===
- Adkins, H.L. (35) undermanager.
- Bloor, James Alfred (51) H.M. Sub-Inspector of Mines.
- Cocks, John (57) managing director.
- Condliffe, Percey (35) collier.
- Cooke, Josiah (37) collier.
- Cooper, Albert Leslie (30) collier.
- Cornes, Albert Edward (26) haulage hand.
- Finney, Harold John (41) H.M. Senior Inspector of Mines.
- Forrester, J.W. (40) Hanley Rescue Brigade.
- Harris, Thomas Ernest (46) Hanley Rescue Brigade.
- Harvey, John (39) fireman.
- Hassell, John (35) ripper.
- Haystead, William (45) packer.
- Hodkinson, William Stanley (38) underground mechanic.
- Hough, W. (37) Hanley Rescue Brigade.
- Howle, Frederick John (36) collier.
- Jackson, Reginald (35) collier.
- Johnstone, Harry (34) overman.
- Jones, Ernest (51) fireman.
- Jones, Thomas Henry (28) collier.
- Latham, Samuel Henry (28) Hanley Rescue Brigade.
- Maiyer, Abel (39) underground mechanic.
- Mitchell, Henry (44) underground mechanic.
- Pepper, William (39) fireman.
- Pickerill, George Thomas (30) ripper.
- Price, Charles (33) collier.
- Rushton, George Thomas (41) ripper.
- Seaton, Albert Warwick (26) collier.
- Stanton, Arthur R. (31) packer.
- Turner, Frank (22) underground electrician.

=== Men who escaped with injuries ===
- Bentley, Harry (47) fireman.
- Birchall, Harry (34) collier.
- Bloor, Percey (49) fireman.
- Davies, John Owen (45) manager.
- Edwards, George (29) collier.
- Lightfoot, Job (33) Hanley Rescue Brigade.
- Salt, Frederick Charles (39) collier.
- Stanier, George (37) collier.

== Aftermath ==
"I desire to thank the hon. and gallant Gentleman for his words of sympathy and appreciation of these brave men. They went down the pit to save their fellows, and Staffordshire will never forget them."

— Josiah Wedgwood, MP for Newcastle-under-Lyme, speaking in the House of Commons.

On 19 October 1937 Scottish Football League champions Rangers travelled to the Victoria Ground to play Stoke City in a benefit match for the victims of the disaster, raising £2,000 for the relief fund.

Today a memorial stands to the victims at Apedale Heritage Centre.

=== Investigation ===
The first plan was the safest course of action, however the second plan was adopted to save profits at the risk of lives.

"It is my considered opinion that at the time the second plan was adopted, very dangerous conditions existed, and were known at the time to exist which made the attempt to follow this plan a matter of imminent peril to the lives of the unnecessarily large number of men required to execute it."

— Inspector Mr.F.H. Wynne concludes his investigation.

The original fire was concluded to have originated in the coal cutting machine and was due to frictional heat produced by the picks in the cut. The explosions were caused by firedamp.

=== Later tragedies ===
Between 1949 and 1967 eleven more deaths were recorded. Most of these were due to roof falls.

== See also ==
- List of accidents and disasters by death toll#Coal mine disasters
- List of disasters in Great Britain and Ireland
