= Francis Parsons (painter) =

English painter

Francis Parsons (fl. 1763–1783, died 1804) was an English portrait painter. He was a student at the drawing academy in St. Martin's Lane. In 1763 he exhibited at the Society of Artists' exhibition in Spring Gardens portraits of an Indian chief and of Miss Davies the actress. Parsons was a member of the Incorporated Society of Artists, and served as director in 1775 and the following years, and as their treasurer in 1776. A portrait of James Brindley the engineer, by Parsons, was engraved in mezzotint by R. Dunkarton in 1770, and published by Parsons at his house in Great Ormond Street, London. The same portrait was also engraved by Cook. Another portrait of Cunne Shote, a Cherokee chief, by Parsons, was engraved in mezzotint by J. McArdell. As he did not succeed greatly in portraiture, Parsons latterly kept a shop as a dealer in and restorer of pictures. He exhibited for the last time in 1783.

== Notes ==
Attribution

This article incorporates text from a publication now in the public domain: Lee, Sidney, ed. (1895). "Parsons, Francis". Dictionary of National Biography. Vol. 43. London: Smith, Elder & Co.
