= James Brindley =

English canal engineer

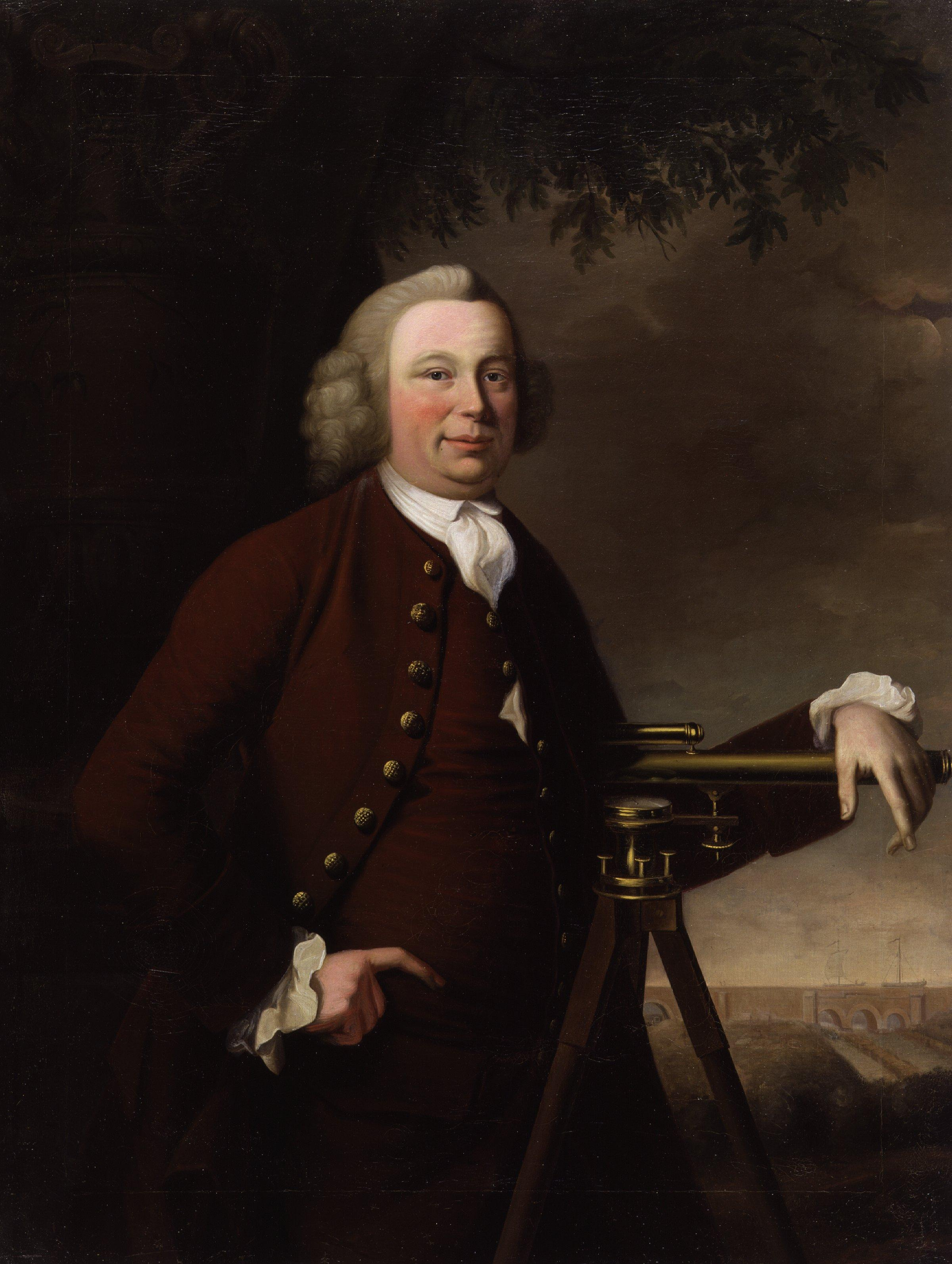
James Brindley with Barton Aqueduct in the background by Francis Parsons (1770)

James Brindley (1716 – 27 September 1772) was an English engineer. He was born in Tunstead, Derbyshire, and lived much of his life in Leek, Staffordshire, becoming one of the most notable engineers of the 18th Century.

Born in the Peak District, which in those days was extremely isolated, Brindley received little formal education, but was educated at home by his mother. At age 17, encouraged by his mother, he was apprenticed to a millwright in exceptional skill and ability. Having completed his apprenticeship he set up business for himself as a wheelwright in Leek, Staffordshire. In 1750 he expanded his business by renting a millwright's shop in Burslem from the Wedgwoods who became his lifelong friends. He soon established a reputation for ingenuity and skill at repairing many different kinds of machinery. In 1752 he designed and built an engine for draining a coal mine, the Wet Earth Colliery at Clifton, formerly in Lancashire, now in Greater Manchester. Three years later he built a machine for a silk mill at Congleton.

== Early canal engineering ==
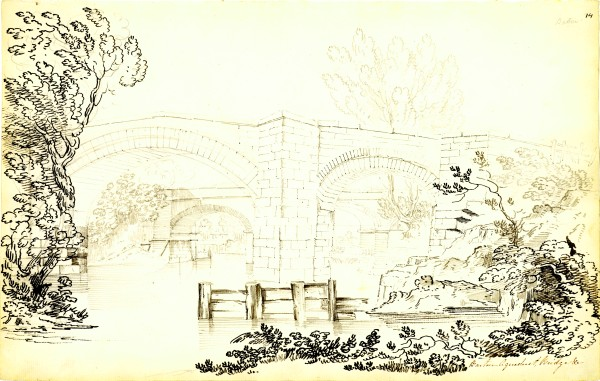
The Barton Aqueduct over the River Irwell, 1807

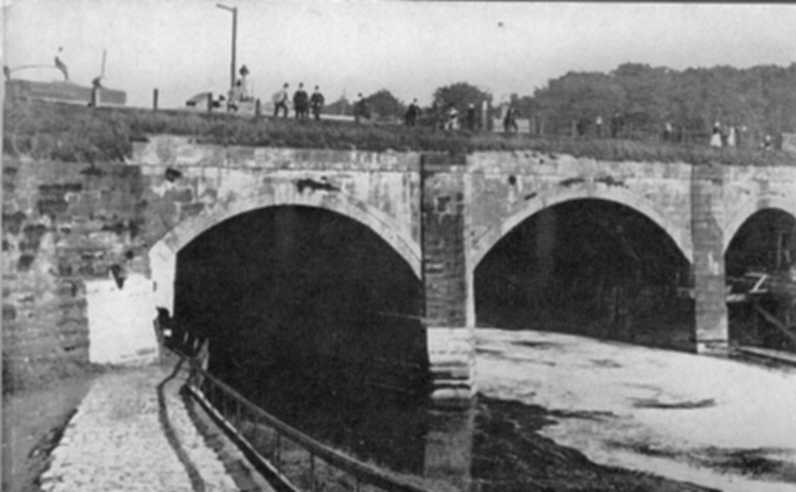
Barton Aqueduct, shortly before its demolition, 1891

Brindley's reputation brought him to the attention of the 3rd Duke of Bridgewater, who was looking for a way to improve the transport of coal from his coal mines at Worsley to Manchester.

In 1759 the Duke commissioned the construction of a canal to do just that. The resulting Bridgewater Canal, opened in 1761, is often regarded as the first British canal of the modern era (though the Sankey Canal has a good claim to that title), and was a major technical triumph. Brindley was commissioned as the consulting engineer. However, although Brindley has often been credited as the genius behind the construction of the canal, it is now thought that the main designers were the Duke himself, who had some engineering training, and his land agent and engineer John Gilbert. Brindley was engaged, at the insistence of Gilbert, to assist with particular problems such as the Barton Aqueduct. This most impressive feature of the canal carried the canal at an elevation of 12 metres (39 ft) over the River Irwell at Barton. (Note: In 1893, on the building of the Manchester Ship Canal, the aqueduct was replaced by the equally impressive Barton Swing Aqueduct.)

Brindley's technique minimised the amount of earth moving by developing the principle of contouring. He preferred to use a circuitous route that avoided embankments, and tunnels rather than cuttings. Though this recognised the primitive methods of earth-moving available at the time, it meant that his canals were often much longer than a more adventurous approach would have produced. But his greatest contribution was the technique of puddling clay to produce a watertight clay-based material, and its use in lining canals. Puddle clay was used extensively in UK canal construction in the period starting shortly after his death. Starting about 1840 puddle clay was used more widely as the water-retaining element (or core) within earthfill dams, particularly in the Pennines.

== Master canal engineer ==
Brindley's reputation spread rapidly and he was soon commissioned to construct more canals. He extended the Bridgewater to Runcorn, connecting it to his next major work, the Trent and Mersey Canal. At this time Brindley had never built a lock and he first built an experimental lock in the grounds of Turnhurst, a house he had bought near the summit, and this determined the design of the narrow canal lock which characterised most of the canals in the Midlands, with a single upper gate and double mitre lower gates. These were for an elongated version of the boats designed for the underground system at Worsley, the so-called 'starvationers', which were subsequently known as narrowboats and this decision was to cast a long shadow on the English canal system.

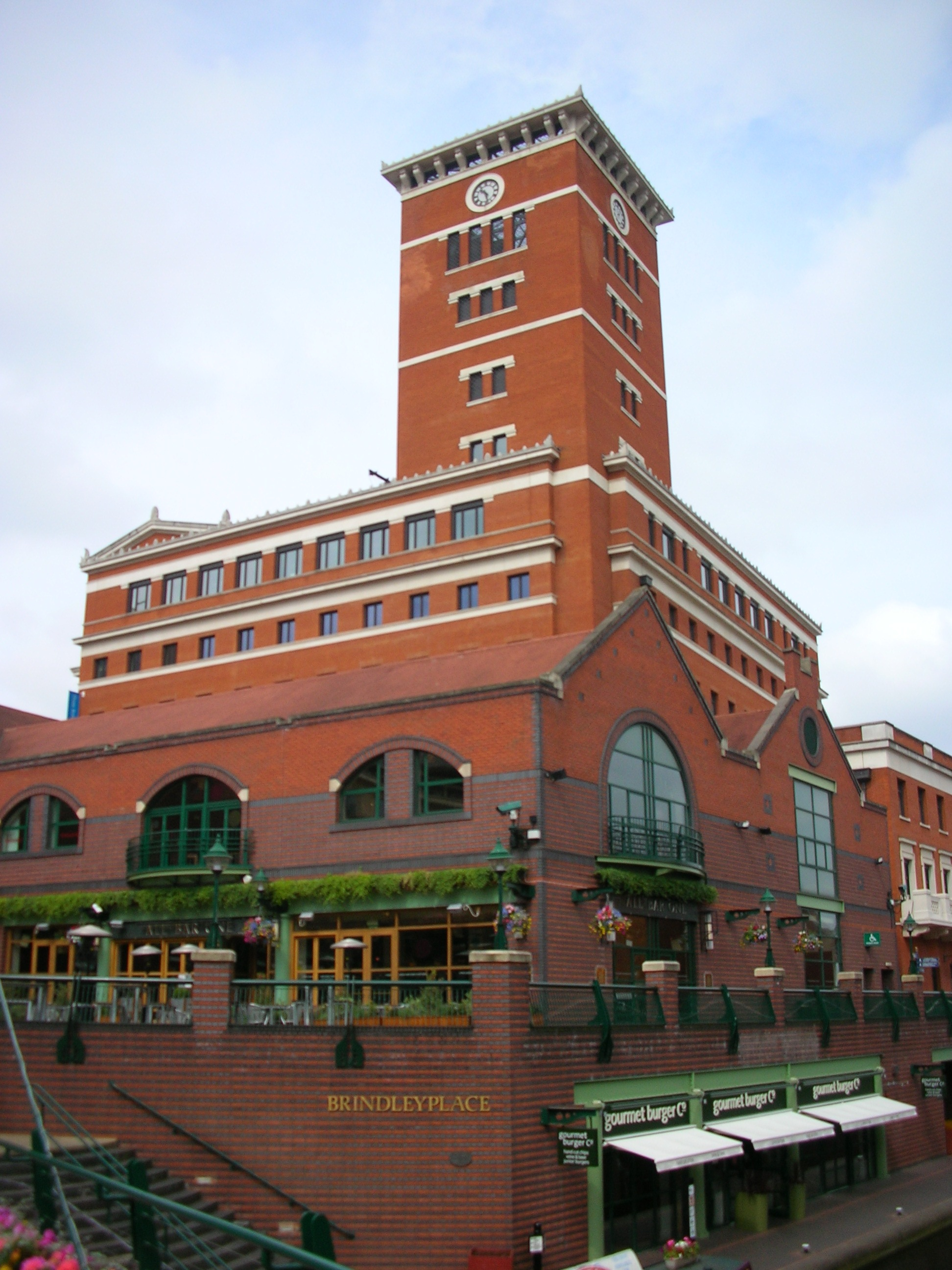
Brindleyplace, Birmingham

Brindley believed it would be possible to use canals to link the four great rivers of England: the Mersey, Trent, Severn and Thames (the "Grand Cross" scheme). In 1762 he "set out for Chester and Shropshire survey or a raconitering" according to his diary. He had with him a sketch map of the continuation of the Dee southwards past Whitchurch.

Since the potteries around Stoke-on-Trent were in desperate need of something better than the pack-horse to carry their fragile wares, they wholeheartedly supported the connection of Staffordshire to the Trent and to the Mersey. The first sod was cut by Josiah Wedgwood in 1766 and Brindley carried it away in a barrow. From Runcorn, the canal would climb by a series of thirty-five locks, pass through a 3000-yard tunnel (the Harecastle Tunnel), then descend by a further forty locks to join the Trent at Wilden Ferry, near Shardlow. There was mounting ridicule about his scheme and in the event, although the canal opened from Shardlow to near Stafford in 1770, it took eleven years to drive the tunnel.

The Trent and Mersey Canal was the first part of this ambitious network, of which the later Chester Canal, started in 1772, was a component.

However, although Brindley and his assistants surveyed the whole potential system – from the start, he had asserted his view of the Trent and Mersey as the "Grand Trunk Canal", the Grand Cross of waterways across the country – he did not live to see it completed. The Harecastle Tunnel finally opened in 1777 and coal was finally transported from the Midlands to the Thames at Oxford in January 1790, some 18 years after Brindley's death. Development of the network, therefore, had to be left to other engineers, such as Thomas Telford.

In total, throughout his life Brindley built 365 miles (587 km) of canals and many watermills, including the Staffordshire and Worcestershire Canal, the Coventry Canal, the Oxford Canal and numerous others, and he also constructed the watermill at Leek, now the Brindley Water Museum.

== Last years and epitaph ==
... so occupied was his mind with his business, that he was incapable of relaxing in any of the common amusements of life. As he had not the ideas of other men to assist him, whenever a point of difficulty in contrivance occurred, it was his custom to retire to his bed, where in perfect solitude he would lie for one, two, or three days, pondering the matter in his mind, till the requisite expedient had presented itself.

— John Aikin, A Description of the Country from Thirty to Forty Miles round Manchester

Brindley married Anne Henshall on 8 December 1765 when he was 49 and she was 19. Anne's brother, Hugh Henshall, was involved in canal construction himself, on the Manchester, Bolton and Bury Canal. The couple had two daughters, Anne and Susannah.

In 1771, work had begun on the Chesterfield Canal, but while surveying a new branch of the Trent and Mersey between Froghall and Leek, Brindley was drenched in a severe rainstorm. It had happened many times before, but he was unable to dry out properly at the inn at which he was staying, and caught a chill. He became seriously ill and returned to his home at Turnhurst, Staffordshire, where Erasmus Darwin attended him and discovered that he was suffering from diabetes.

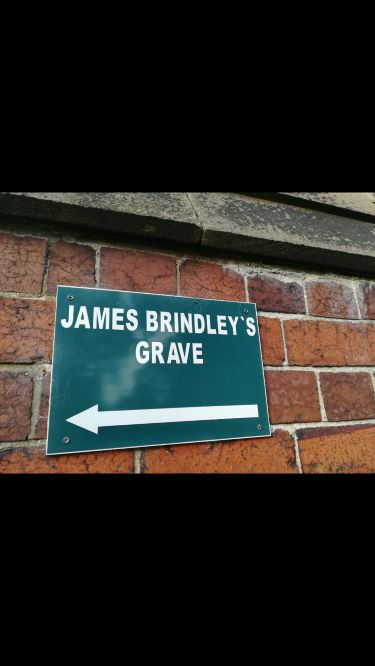
James Brindley Marker, in Newchapel, 2020

James Brindley died at Turnhurst on 27 September 1772. He was buried on 30 September, just nine days after the completion of his Birmingham Canal, at St. James in Newchapel in Staffordshire, England. The commemorative plaque (1956) at the church shows his date of death as 25 September. The inscription on his grave reads "James Brindley, of Turnhurst, engineer, was interred 30 September 1772, aged 56."

Brindley's widow remarried in 1775 (Robert Williamson, one of Brindley's assistants) and lived until 1799.

Brindley's death was noted in the Chester Courant of 1 December 1772 in the form of an epitaph:

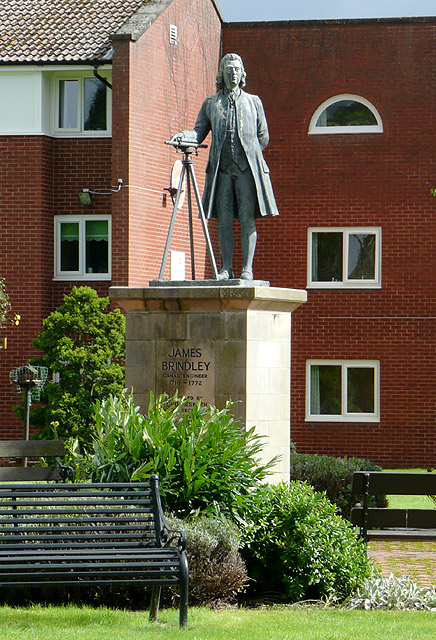
Statue of Brindley in Etruria

JAMES BRINDLEY lies amongst these Rocks,
He made Canals, Bridges, and Locks,
To convey Water; he made Tunnels
For Barges, Boats, and Air-Vessels;
He erected several Banks,
Mills, Pumps, Machines, with Wheels and Cranks;
He was famous t'invent Engines,
Calculated for working Mines;
He knew Water, its Weight and Strength,
Turn'd Brooks, made Soughs to a great Length;
While he used the Miners' Blast,
He stopp'd Currents from running too fast;
There ne'er was paid such Attention
As he did to Navigation.
But while busy with Pit or Well,
His Spirits sunk below Level;
And, when too late, his Doctor found,
Water sent him to the Ground.

He is remembered in Birmingham by Brindley Drive (on the site of former canal yards), the Brindleyplace mixed-use development and a pub, The James Brindley (both being canal-side features), and the James Brindley Academy for children in Birmingham's hospitals and with other special needs, there is also a residential building built over the canal that is called Brindley House; in Leek with the James Brindley Mill; and by numerous other streets in the areas in which he worked. Within the grounds of James Brindley Primary School at Parr Fold Avenue, Walkden, is a wooden barge once used for the transportation of coal from local mines. There is a statue of him (leaning over his desk) by James Walter Butler (bronze, 18 September 1998) located in the canal basin by Leicester Row, Coventry, and another by Colin Melbourne (bronze, 20 July 1990) in Lower Bedford Street, Etruria, Stoke-on-Trent, at the junction of the Trent and Mersey Canal with the Caldon Canal, opposite Etruria Industrial Museum. He is commemorated in Runcorn by the Brindley Arts Centre, which opened in the autumn of 2004. There is also James Brindley Science College (previously James Brindley High School) in Chell, Stoke-on-Trent, and also, the Brindley's Lock pub on Silverstone Crescent, Stoke-on-Trent.

The well in the village of Wormhill is dedicated to Brindley. Wormhill is in the same Parish as Tunstead where he was born.

== See also ==
- History of the British canal system
- Waterways in the United Kingdom
- List of civil engineers
