= Hamnet Holditch =

British mathematician

- Born: 1800; King's Lynn, Norfolk, England
- Died: 12 December 1867 (aged 66–67); Cambridge, England
- Education: Gonville and Caius College, Cambridge
- Known for: Holditch's theorem
- Awards: Smith's Prize (1822)
- Scientific career
- Fields: Mathematics

Rev. Hamnet Holditch, also spelled Hamnett Holditch (1800 – 12 December 1867), was an English mathematician who was President of Gonville and Caius College, Cambridge. In 1858, he introduced the result in geometry now known as Holditch's theorem.

Hamnet Holditch was born in 1800 in King's Lynn, the son of George Holditch, pilot and harbour-master. Educated at King's Lynn Grammar School under Rev. Martin Coulcher, he matriculated at Gonville and Caius College, Cambridge in 1818, and graduated B.A. in 1822 (Senior Wrangler and 1st Smith's Prize), M.A. in 1825.

At Gonville and Caius College, Holditch was a junior fellow from 1821 and a senior fellow from 1823, and held the college posts of lecturer in Hebrew and Greek, registrar, steward, salarist (1823–28), bursar (1828–31), and President (1835–67).

He died at Gonville and Caius College on 12 December 1867, aged 67, and was buried at North Wootton.

Although Holditch produced ten mathematical papers, he was extremely idle as a tutor. John Venn, an undergraduate at Caius in the 1850s then a Caius Fellow from 1857, noted that Holditch, despite his succession of college offices, "beyond a few private pupils, never took part in educational work":

He was a very ingenious mathematician, and would probably have distinguished himself had he been compelled to work. Remarkable for his extreme shyness. On account of some ancient slight he for many years entirely absented himself from Hall and Chapel, and few members of the college knew him even by sight:— an undergraduate once showed him round the college, taking him for a stranger. The whole summer he spent fishing in Scotland or Wales.

— John Venn, Biographical History of Gonville and Caius College

It is curious to see Holditch coming out of his den, which he does once in ten years, with something about rolling curves or caustics. He was senior wrangler the year before Airy, and what has made a man of such decided talent shut himself up I never heard.

— Augustus De Morgan (1865)

== Bibliography ==
- Rev. Hamnett Holditch, "Concise Demonstration of the Property of the Parabola", The London and Edinburgh Philosophical Magazine and Journal of Science, vol. 10, 1837, pp. 35–36. (Google Books)
- Hamnett Holditch, "On Rolling Curves", Transactions of the Cambridge Philosophical Society, vol. 7, (1842), pp. 61–86. (Google Books)
- Rev. H. Holditch, "On Small Finite Oscillations", Transactions of the Cambridge Philosophical Society, Volume the Eighth, Cambridge, 1849, pp. 89–104. (Google Books)
- Rev. Hamnet Holditch, "On the Caustic by Reflection from a Spherical Surface", The Quarterly Journal of Pure and Applied Mathematics, vol. 1, London, 1857, pp. 93–111. (Google Books)
- Rev. Hamnet Holditch, "Geometrical Theorem", The Quarterly Journal of Pure and Applied Mathematics, vol. 2, London, 1858, p. 38. (Google Books; Internet Archive)
- Rev. Hamnet Holditch, "On the n^{th} Caustic, by Reflexion from a Circle", The Quarterly Journal of Pure and Applied Mathematics, vol. 2, London, 1858, pp. 301–322. (Google Books)
- Rev. Hamnet Holditch, "On the n^{th} Evolutes and Involutes of Curves", The Quarterly Journal of Pure and Applied Mathematics, vol. 3, London, 1860, pp. 236–246. (Google Books)
- Rev. Hamnet Holditch, "Theorems on Related Curves", The Quarterly Journal of Pure and Applied Mathematics, vol. 3, London, 1860, pp. 271–274. (Google Books)
- Rev. Hamnet Holditch, "On Double Tangents", The Quarterly Journal of Pure and Applied Mathematics, vol. 4, London, 1861, pp. 28–44. (Google Books)
- Rev. Hamnet Holditch, "On a Magic Square", The Quarterly Journal of Pure and Applied Mathematics, vol. 6, London, 1864, pp. 181–189. (Google Books)
