= Holditch (ward) =

Coordinates: 53.031°N 2.250°W

Holditch was a ward in the Borough of Newcastle-under-Lyme, in the county of Staffordshire, England. It covered the suburbs of Broad Meadow, and Beasley. The population of the ward at the 2011 census was 4,694.
