= Apedale Heritage Centre =

Museum in Staffordshire, England

Coordinates: 53.032°N 2.266°W

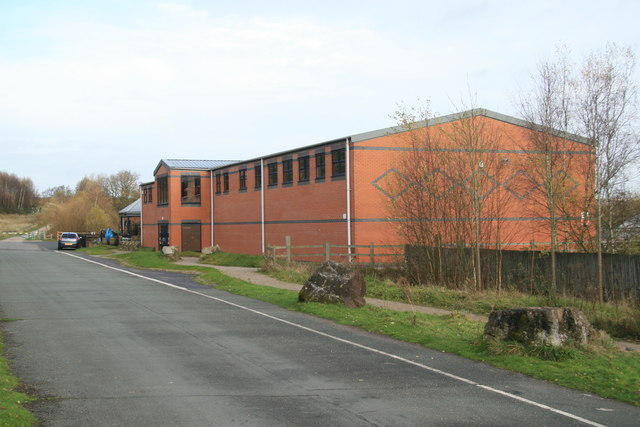
Apedale Heritage Centre

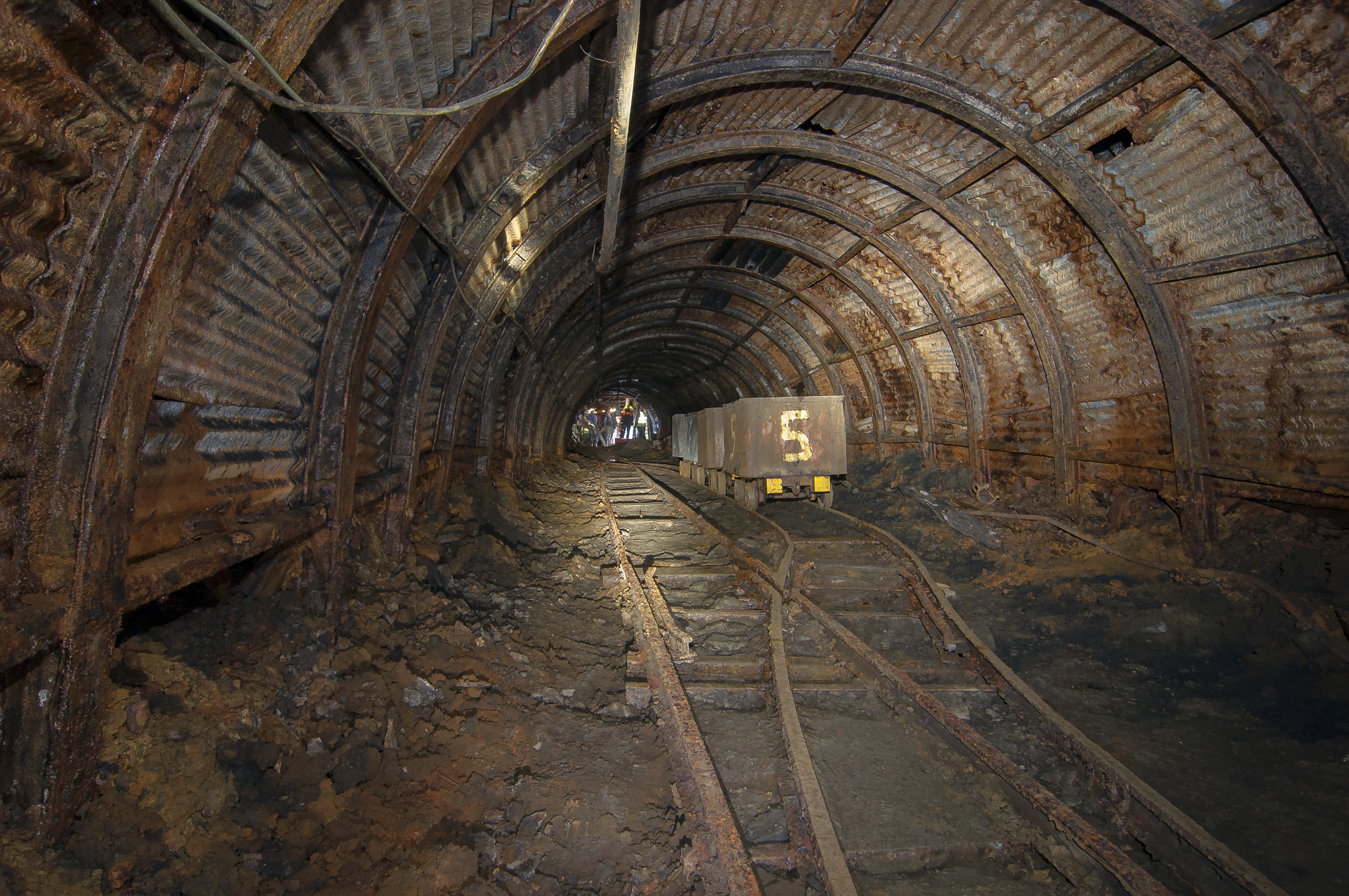
Apedale Mine

The Apedale Heritage Centre was created at the site of Staffordshire's Apedale Mine and is run by volunteers. It is located just outside the village of Chesterton near Newcastle-under-Lyme in the Apedale Community Country Park.

Attractions include mine tours and a museum which concentrates on the area's history, and industrial heritage. Opening times are 10:30 to 16:00 daily with the underground tours taking place on weekends and bank holidays.

The site is also the home of the Moseley Railway Trust's collection of narrow gauge industrial locomotives. A selection of locomotives can be viewed in the heritage centre museum and the trust holds open days for the public. Work is under way to construct a separate museum and railway for the collection. Construction began in 2025.
