= Wolstanton United Urban District =

Former local government area in the UK

Coordinates: 53.04°N 2.24°W

- Area
  - 1911: 5,422 acres (21.94 km^{2})
  - 1931: 5,422 acres (21.94 km^{2})
- Population
  - 1901: 22,645
  - 1931: 30,525
- History
  - Created: 1904
  - Abolished: 1932
  - Succeeded by: Newcastle-under-Lyme Municipal Borough
- Status: Urban district

Wolstanton United Urban District was an urban district in the county of Staffordshire. It was formed in 1904 with the civil parishes of Chesterton, Silverdale and Wolstanton. It was abolished in 1932, when it was absorbed into the Newcastle-under-Lyme Municipal Borough.
