= Holditch's theorem =

On the area enclosed by a point on a rigid chord rotating inside a convex closed curve

In plane geometry, Holditch's theorem states that if a chord of fixed length is allowed to rotate inside a convex closed curve, then the locus of a point on the chord a distance p from one end and a distance q from the other is a closed curve whose enclosed area is less than that of the original curve by $\pi pq$. The theorem was published in 1858 by Rev. Hamnet Holditch. While not mentioned by Holditch, the proof of the theorem requires an assumption that the chord be short enough that the traced locus is a simple closed curve.

== Observations ==
The theorem is included as one of Clifford Pickover's 250 milestones in the history of mathematics. Some peculiarities of the theorem include that the area formula $\pi pq$ is independent of both the shape and the size of the original curve, and that the area formula is the same as for that of the area of an ellipse with semi-axes p and q. The theorem's author was a president of Caius College, Cambridge.

== Extensions ==
Broman gives a more precise statement of the theorem, along with a generalization. The generalization allows, for example, consideration of the case in which the outer curve is a triangle, so that the conditions of the precise statement of Holditch's theorem do not hold because the paths of the endpoints of the chord have retrograde portions (portions that retrace themselves) whenever an acute angle is traversed. Nevertheless, the generalization shows that if the chord is shorter than any of the triangle's altitudes, and is short enough that the traced locus is a simple curve, Holditch's formula for the in-between area is still correct (and remains so if the triangle is replaced by any convex polygon with a short enough chord). However, other cases result in different formulas.
