= Moseley Railway Trust =

Moseley Railway Trust – Apedale Country Park.
- Location within Staffordshire
- Established: 1968
- Location: near Newcastle-under-Lyme, Staffordshire, England
- Coordinates: 53.033026°N 2.26585°W
- Type: Industrial railway museum & narrow gauge railway
- Collection size: 60+ Locomotives
- Website: Moseley Railway Trust official website

The Moseley Railway Trust is a major British collection of industrial narrow gauge locomotives and other equipment. It originally had its base in south Manchester, but has relocated to the Apedale Community Country Park near Newcastle-under-Lyme, Staffordshire, where the Apedale Valley Light Railway and an important museum are being established next to the Apedale Heritage Centre.

Phase 1 of the 2 ft (610 mm) narrow gauge Apedale Valley Light Railway opened to the public in August 2010. Plans for the large new museum building have been approved by the local council and it was intended that construction will commence during 2011.

It is planned that there will eventually be an industrial demonstration railway line running around the perimeter of the MRT/Apedale Heritage Centre site, connecting with a recreation of an adit called No 7 Drift, from which coal was extracted by the previous occupiers of the site, the Aurora Mining Company, until around 1998.

== Overview ==
From summer 1998 to summer 2008, the trust's collection was in storage, initially at a site in Whaley Bridge, and later at a site at Buxworth in Derbyshire, having been forced to vacate its site at Cheadle, near Manchester, where it had operated a 2 ft (610 mm) gauge railway – the Moseley Tramway – using its ex-industrial locomotives. Although starting work on site at Apedale on 6 April 2006, the trust formally took possession of the site on 13 April 2006 with partners Apedale Heritage Centre, the trust set about adapting the existing former mines buildings to serve as a base for the collection. A new locomotive storage building was constructed during 2008 to house the collection, although the collection continued to grow, rendering this space inadequate to house the current collection and necessitating provision of further storage in former shipping containers around the site. The main running line for the passenger railway was completed in July 2010 and opened the following month. The Silverdale station building was brought into use in 2011, and now houses a shop for books and souvenirs, as well as providing an information point and tickets sales for the railway.

From 2011, construction was started on the foundations of a new museum building which will allow the trust to display its collection of industrial narrow gauge equipment that has been gathered from various industries around the UK since the trust's early days in the late 1960s. From summer 2013, the start of construction of a demonstration railway around the adjoining field, part of the land jointly owned with Apedale Heritage Centre, was commenced and in operation for the 2014 event commemorating the start of the First World War. This 2014 event, called Tracks to the Trenches, also saw the trust construct a short section of a World War 1 trench system which would allow re-enactors to demonstrate the interaction of light railways with the requirements of the front line.

Work continues behind the scenes to provide a railway extension across the Apedale Road and further into the Apedale Valley. As of 2018, this has made good progress following discussions with other interested groups, but is currently held up by legal aspects of some rights of ways which need to be addressed before construction can commence.

== History of the Trust ==
Originally an after school club at the Moseley Hall Grammar school, and believed to have started around 1967 under the leadership of teacher Colin Saxton, the club, known as the Moseley Tramway, initially operated a horse-drawn line on special occasions. The original material came from a local brickwork's, and when the school transferred to a new modern site at Cheadle Road, Cheadle Hulme, Stockport, around 1970, the railway was moved too.

At the new site, the original gauge of 20 in (508 mm) was changed to be 2 ft (610 mm) and the collection expanded to include some internal combustion locomotives, again sourced from local industry. During the 1970s, the UK's grammar school system was abandoned, and the school became a comprehensive school under the new system, but the railway survived and flourished. By the 1990s, there was around half a mile of track and around 15 locomotives. It was during this period that the changing population profile caused the school to be closed and converted into a tertiary college – the Ridge-Danyers Tertiary College. By this time, the railway group was an independent club, and following some disagreements over the running of the club, former teacher Colin Saxton removed his equipment, ultimately setting it up near Redruth, Cornwall under the name Moseley Tramway once more. Meanwhile, the club were offered a lease by the college, which they took, however this was a ploy by the college to have the railway removed from the site, since by converting "sitting tenants" to lessees, there was a termination clause included in the lease. The eviction notice arrived during late 1996, and gave until summer 1998 to remove everything. Thus began an odyssey: a search for a new site. In parallel with this, the former Moseley Tramway committee started to look at what the trust should become in the future. Particularity, as an unincorporated club, the group was unable to sign leases etc., and so one of the first tasks was to form a company – the Moseley Industrial Narrow Gauge Railway Museum Trust Ltd, which was a typical name produced by committee as fully representing the aims of the group. This long-winded name was incorporated on 12 April 1998, but shortened to be Moseley Railway Trust (MRT), initially for convenience, and eventually becoming the legal name in May 2009.

During the seven years between the formal notice being served and the identification of a new home – Apedale – a total of 300 possible sites were located, examined, discussed, and then discarded. Meanwhile, with the July 1998 deadline approaching, attention moved to finding a storage location, and a former mill in Whaley Bridge, the Meverill Springs Works, off New Lane, was identified as being suitable for the storage needs, and the collection was moved there that summer.

In Summer 2000, an open day was held to allow the collection to be viewed by enthusiasts, which proved quite popular. But unfortunately, having been resident for about 3 years, the site was sold for a housing development and the newly formed Moseley Railway trust was forced to hunt for another storage site. The next one was found about a mile away at Buxworth, once more in an old mill, although this site was less than ideal, being situated on a relatively steeply graded site.

Searches for a permanent site continued during this period in storage, and in late 2002 a letter about some land in Sandbach, Cheshire arrived at the Foden lorry works in Sandbach was sent. This found its way to the Apedale Heritage Centre at Chesterton near Newcastle-under-Lyme, who were looking to partner a railway attraction at their site off Loomer Road. A site visit and meeting were arranged and an agreement was made – the search was finally over.

It was however to be another three years before the site was ready for occupation. An interview with Peter Morris of Staffordshire County Council (SCC) in February 2003 was arranged, with the result that SCC agreed to work with MRT to develop a mile-long railway which passed over Apedale Road and into the adjacent Apedale Country Park. Initially the 8.5-acre site adjacent to the Apedale Heritage Centre was to be bought by the local council, but difficulties were encountered, leading to a decision for MRT and AHC to jointly purchase the land. which was completed on 13 April 2006.

== Site development ==
Early access to the site before the sale completion was granted by the seller, and work to convert the corrugated iron shed (known as the Red Shed) which had formerly housed the coal bagging plant commenced on Friday 6 April. There was some urgency for this work since the Cadeby Light Railway group had been asked to relocate before the end of May 2006 – a task which was accomplished on time.

A period of adapting the former mine buildings took place from April 2006, and planning permission was applied for to both construct the mile-long railway, convert the buildings to a new use, and to construct a locomotive storage building (the Aurora North building) which would be 140 ft long and 25 ft wide (42.6m x 7.6m). The permission also included outline consent for a water tower in the Silverdale Station area, as well as a museum of 29m x 12m (120 feet x 40 feet) adjacent to the running line and situated to the north of the Silverdale Station building. An application to modify the route of a footpath which crossed the site was also applied for, although the process ultimately took four years to complete.

By early 2007, the existing former mines buildings were functional, with running water and power in place, and the workshop building had undergone some conversion work to adapt it to its new use, and thoughts turned to construction of the railway. Groundwork was carried out in front of the Silverdale station (still a floor slab only at this stage) and a section of ballast, suitable for a double track loop, was prepared for about 150m. In early March, the first section of track was laid – the release points and headshunt at the Heritage Centre end of the railway. Over the following weeks, this was extended to the Red Shed, where a connection was finally made, and the first loco was able to run from the Red Shed up to the Heritage Centre.

The main line was continued down past the Red Shed and into the yard area north of the Red Shed, and during 2008, contractors laid the foundations for the Aurora North building, and this work was complete by June 2008. With its completion, the way forward was clear to finally vacate the storage site at Buxworth – something which was costing the trust £500 per month to use. By August 2008, Buxworth was vacated, and all locomotives within the collection were now at Apedale, allowing a first Gala to be held, albeit without the possibility of passenger rides.

Construction work continued, (leaving a gap in the line alongside Aurora North to allow for the footpath, as yet undiverted) with the loop at Apedale Road station being completed, as well as fencing alongside the whole of the line on the Country Park side. By July 2010, the footpath diversion had been finalised, and the running line completed and tested by the start of August. Thus on 14 August 2010, the heads of department agreed that passenger services could start running the following week. Such was the enthusiasm, that chatting with some interested onlookers walking on the new footpath alongside the railway, the first train was run that day at about 4pm. Services officially commenced on 21 August 2010, using a temporary platform to the north of the Silverdale Station pending the station's completion.

The line was fully completed following finalising of the footpath diversion, and the first passenger train with paying passengers ran in the late afternoon of 14 August 2010. The official opening and first official passenger trains started on 21 August 2010, following which a regular service ran each Saturday until the end of October. Santa trains ran for the first time that December, and the railway has since operated each season from 2011 onward between the start of April and the end of October.

For the 2014 'Tracks to the Trenches' commemorative event, a field railway was laid around the perimeter of the event field, and included a steeply graded branch to serve the replica WW1 trench. This was to allow cameo's to be set up to permit re-enactors to demonstrate the process of using the trench, delivering stores and equipment by rail, and evacuating wounded. Over the following years, the field railway was further extended to provide additional wagon storage, and the long-term intention is to complete a loop to join up with the trench railway branch. Two further major 'Tracks to the Trenches' events were held, in 2016 and 2018, and all three events won critical acclaim for their diversity and presentation of equipment and material from WW1, with a significant number of WW1 re-enactors attending each event.

In 2020, despite the limitations caused by the COVID-19 pandemic, two further major projects were carried out. Recognising that additional under-cover secure locomotive storage was needed, a second locomotive storage shed was erected near the WW1 Trench exhibit. This new building, called Aurora South, has four tracks, with two entering from each end – a configuration imposed by restrictions in where the building could be constructed due to the existence of a mining adit slightly to the south of the building. A grant for 25% of the funding was provided by the Newcastle-under-Lyme Civic Society, with the remainder of the funding raised by the Trust. The two tracks in the north entrance to the building are multi-gauge, allowing 2 ft gauge (610 mm), 2 ft 6 in gauge (762 mm) and 3 ft gauge (914 mm) locomotives to enter the building – the Trust owns locomotives of each of these gauges. Construction of the building started in November 2020, and was completed in January 2021. A local steel building contractor was used for the erection. Work continues to connect the north end tracks to the rest of the infrastructure, but the south end was connected up in early 2021.

The second major project for 2020 was erection of a steam locomotive watering facility at the Silverdale Station at the south end of the passenger line, and was fully funded by a grant from the Newcastle-under-Lyme Civic Society. Construction started in early 2020, with the installation of a reinforced concrete base, followed in November by construction of the brick tower to support a 4000-litre (880 UK gallons) water tank of traditional railway appearance. The water tank was constructed by a local fabricator to a design produced by the Trust, and was completed in August 2020. It was installed on the brickwork tower during August 2021. The water crane, also included with the grant funding, has been designed and should be erected over the winter of 2022–23.

== Railway Museum ==
The piled foundations for the new museum building – the Narrow Gauge Railway Centre – were laid during 2011, but are awaiting funding to move the project forward. The building is 120 ft long and 39 ft wide (36.5m long x 12m wide) is modelled on an LNWR good shed, with the prototype inspiration coming from the former goods shed building to the south of Stafford railway station on the east side of the railway. Eventually, the building will form the carriage shed when the railway is closed, and house a display to interpret narrow gauge railways and their purposes through photographic displays and restored vehicles within the collection. When completed, the building will also include a toilet facility to help cope with visitor numbers on event days.

== Railway extension ==
MRT's intention is to build the railway in several stages. The first stage, from Silverdale Station to Apedale Road, was completed during 2010 and opened to passenger services on 21 August 2010. The station platform at Apedale Road was completed the following year.

The second stage of construction will be from Apedale Road through to a site adjacent to the former Burley Colliery site, and will be known as Burley Shales Station. This will involve a level crossing across Apedale Road, followed by construction of the new line in its own fenced right of way for approximately 600 yards (550 m), giving a total line length of about 1,100 yards (1,000 m). It is expected that once the legal processes are complete, the line construction will take around 18 months.

The third stage of the line's extension will be from Burley Shales site to a site adjacent to the Miry Pools area, located in the former Miry Quarry, and will add another 600 yards (550 m) or railway, bringing the total line distance to just over 1 mile (1.6 km).

== Steam locomotives ==
The trust's steam locomotives include:

- Kerr Stuart, Tattoo class 0-4-2ST Stanhope (works number 2395 of 1917); boiler ticket expired in 2018. Back in service May 2021.
- Kerr Stuart, Joffre type 0-6-0T (works number 3014 of 1916) from WW1 trench railways in France; restored in 2011 and used to haul passenger trains. Boiler ticket expired in September 2020 and is awaiting overhaul. Another "Joffre" type locomotives can be found based at the West Lancashire Light Railway where it is named "Joffre".
- Hudswell Clarke, 0-6-0WT (works number 1238 of 1916) repatriated from Ghana during 2008; restoration commenced in February 2010 and was completed in September 2014 in time for the Tracks to the Trenches event.
- Hunslet, War Office class 4-6-0T (works number 1215 of 1916), WWI trench locomotive repatriated from Australia; has been away from Apedale during a complete stripdown for restoration to steam, which was completed in July 2018, and making its first public appearance at the Tracks to the Trenches Commemoration event held on 13–15 July 2018.
- Replica Decauville Type 1 0-4-0T named Edgar. Constructed 2018 by North Bay Railway Engineering Services. Only recently started operating at the railway and as yet is not passed for hauling passenger trains (September 2022).
- Avonside Engine Company 0-4-0T (works number 1986 of 1928). Repatriated from South Africa in 2020 by Jeremy Martin for his private Richmond Light Railway, Kent, but was subsequently purchased by a Moseley Railway trust member and arrived at the railway in June 2021. Long-term restoration project which will require a new boiler and new frames.
- Bagnall 0-4-0ST (works number 2133 of 1924) named Woto. Moved to the railway in 2024.

== Other locomotives ==
The Trust's collection also includes around 90 petrol, battery and diesel-powered narrow gauge locomotives stored at the site, many of them in the Aurora North and the Aurora South Storage buildings. There are also three internal-combustion locomotives on display in the Apedale Heritage Centre Museum (open weekends between 10:00‒16:00), and some others stored outside.

- Motor Rail 5821, built 1934, was at the Long Eaton West Park Railway from 4 August 1975‒6 July 1977, before moving to the Bala Lake Railway.

== Gallery ==
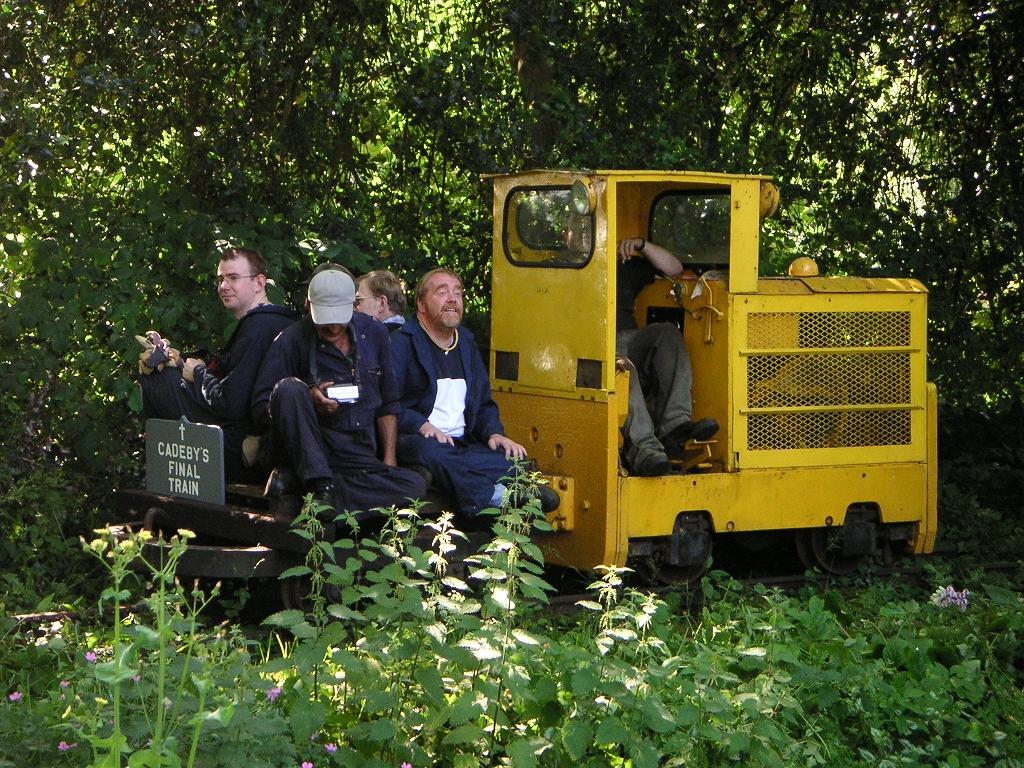
Last train on the Cadeby Light Railway – loco and stock now at Apedale.

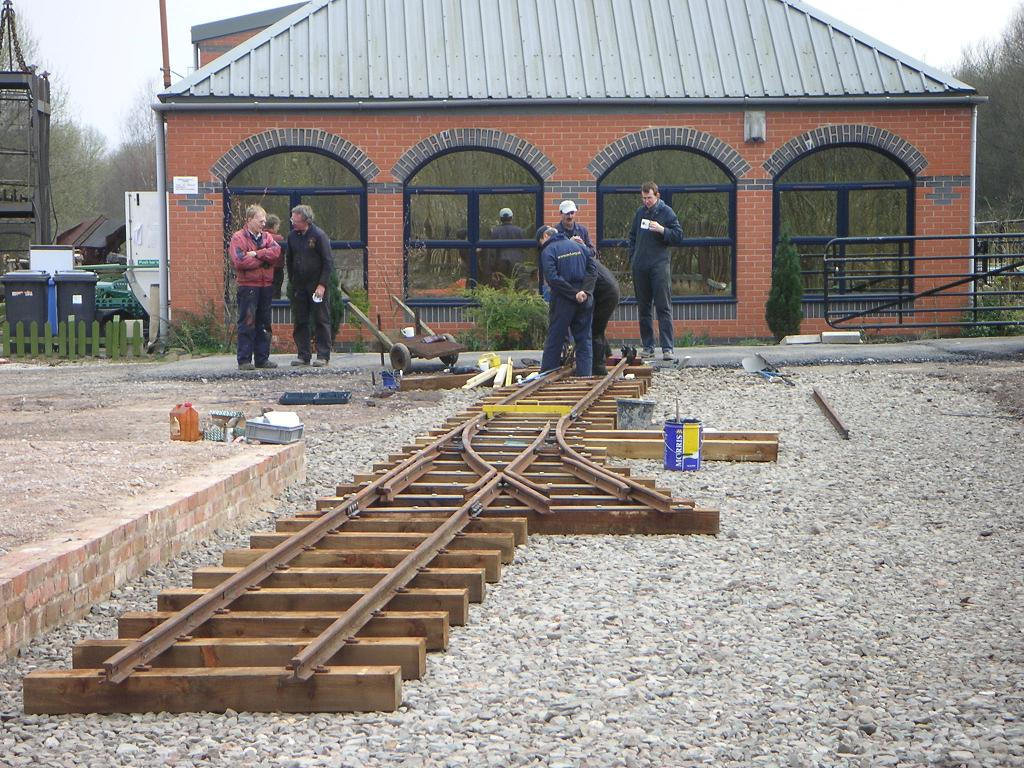
Moseley Railway Trust – Apedale Station construction – March 2007

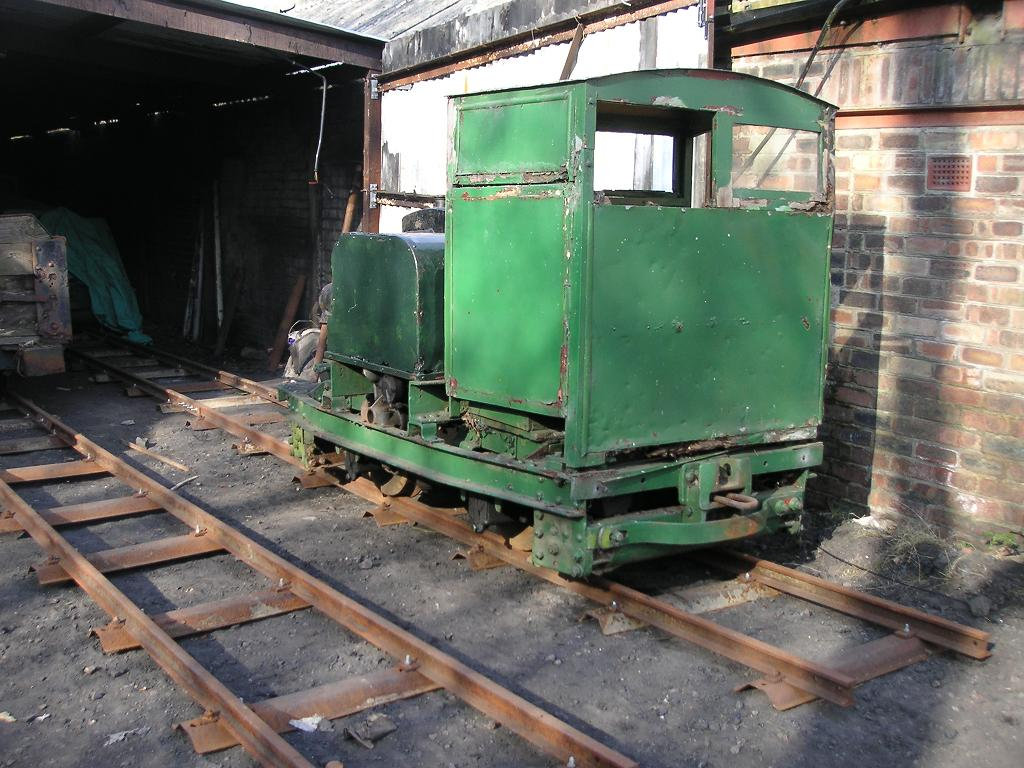
Ex-Cadeby Light Railway MotorRail MR2197 at its new home at Apedale.

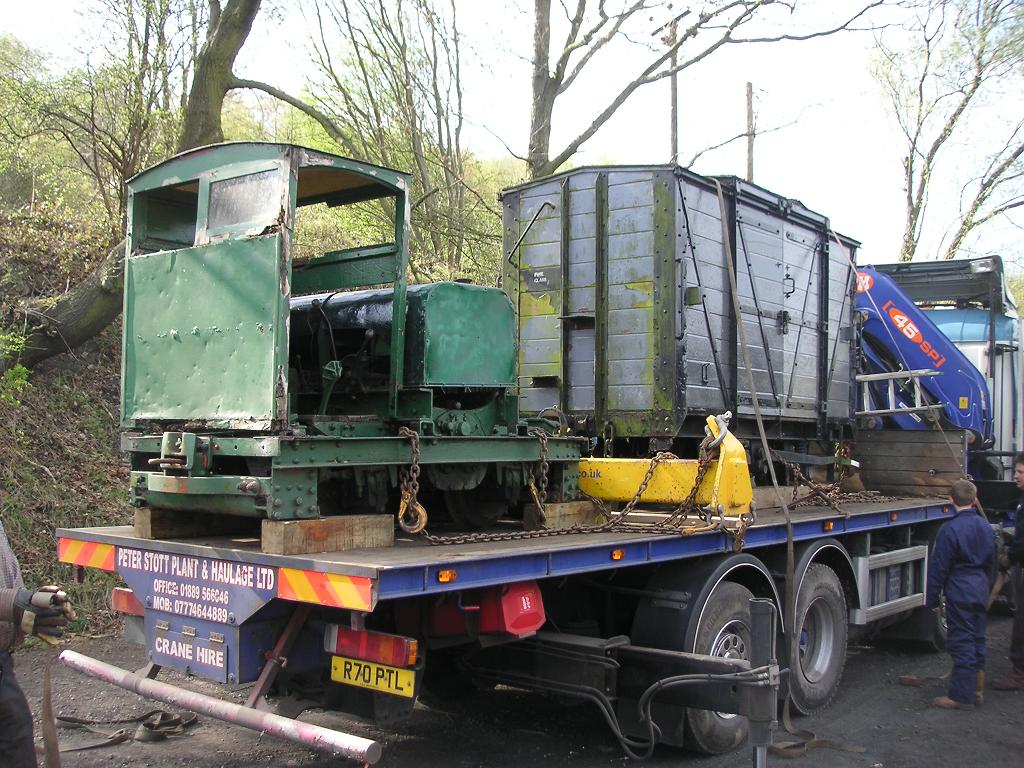
More ex-Cadeby Stock arriving at Apedale.

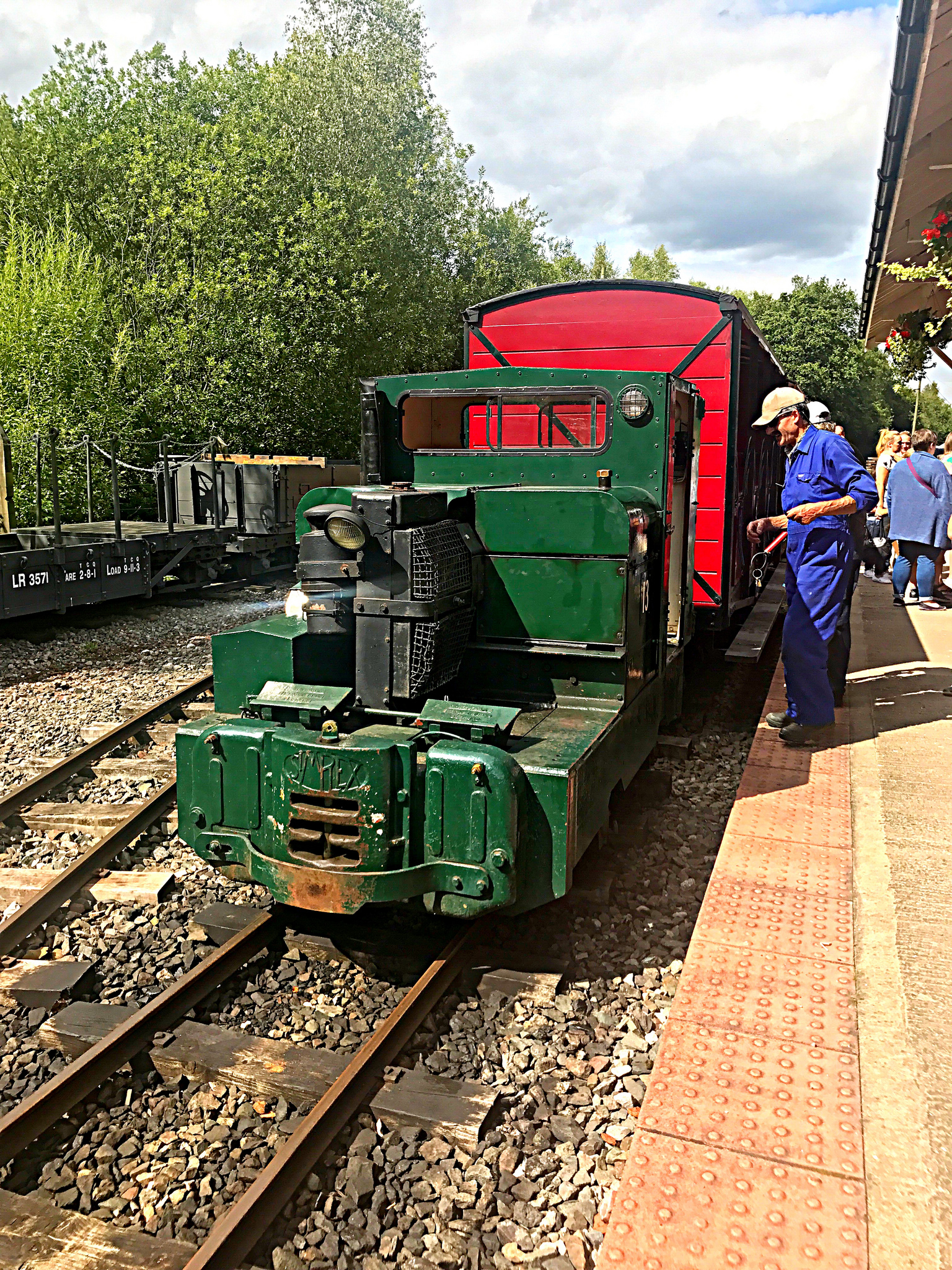
Simplex 13 ”Pilk” MR 11142/1960

== See also ==
- British narrow gauge railways
- West Lancashire Light Railway – former home of Stanhope
- Gloddfa Ganol – source of several MRT locomotives
