= Kidsgrove Urban District =

Former local government area in the UK

Coordinates: 53.09°N 2.24°W

- Area
  - 1911: 3,114 acres (12.60 km^{2})
  - 1961: 4,094 acres (16.57 km^{2})
- Population
  - 1901: 8,320
  - 1971: 22,189
- History
  - Created: 1894
  - Abolished: 1974
  - Succeeded by: Borough of Newcastle-under-Lyme
- Status: Urban district

Kidsgrove Urban District was an urban district in the county of Staffordshire. It was formed in 1894 with the civil parishes of Hardings Wood, Kidsgrove, Newchapel and Talke. It was abolished in 1974, by virtue of the Local Government Act 1972, when it was absorbed into the Borough of Newcastle-under-Lyme.
