= Elsie (given name) =

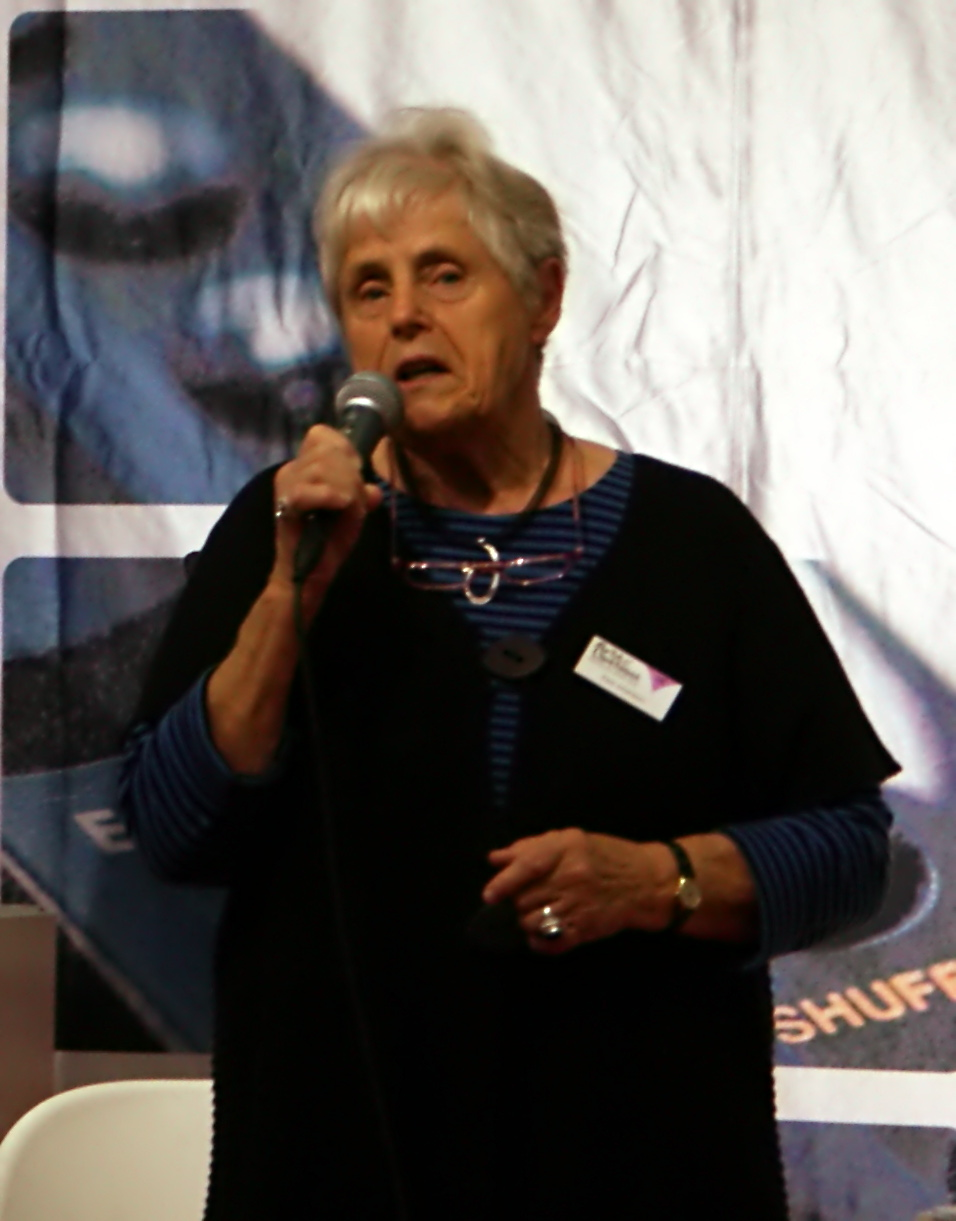
Elsie Johansson, writer and poet from Sweden, in Gothenburg 2008

Elsie is a feminine given name, a diminutive form of Elspeth, a Scottish version of Elizabeth. It has been in use in the Anglosphere as an independent name since the 1800s. The name has increased in usage in English-speaking countries in recent years.

It may refer to:

== People ==
=== Given name ===
- Elsie Abbot (1907–1983), British civil servant
- Elsie Albert (born 1996), Papua New Guinean rugby league player
- Elsie Altmann-Loos (1899–1984), Austrian dancer
- Elsie Baker (1883–1971), American actress and singer
- Elsie West Baker (1886–1958), American singer
- Elsie Barge (1898–1962), American pianist
- Elsie Charles Basque (1916–2016), first Mi'kmaq in Nova Scotia to earn a teacher's certificate
- Elsie Bertram (1912–2003), English bookseller
- Elsie Bowerman (1889–1973), British pioneering female barrister, suffragette, and Titanic survivor
- Elsie Bramell (1909–1985), Australian anthropologist
- Elsie Finnimore Buckley (1882–1959), English writer and translator
- Elsie Cameron Corbett (1893–1977), British volunteer ambulance driver in World War I
- Elsie Cassels (1864–1938), Scottish-born naturalist and Canadian ornithologist
- Essie B. Cheesborough (1826–1905), American writer
- Elsie Cohen (1895–1972), British entrepreneur
- Elsie Cook, secretary for the Scottish Women's Football Association
- Elsie Cameron Corbett (1893–1977), British suffragist, volunteer ambulance driver World War I, and philanthropist
- Elsie Chamberlain (1910–1991), British minister
- Elsie Corlett (1902–1988), English golfer
- Elsie Dahlberg-Sundberg (1916–2005), Swedish sculptor
- Elsie Louisa Deacon (1897–1984), British railway draughtswoman
- Elsie Dohrmann (1875–1909), New Zealand scholar, teacher, and temperance campaigner
- Elsie Dubugras (1904–2006), Brazilian journalist
- Elsie Spicer Eells (1880–1963), American writer
- Elsie Ferguson (1883–1961), American stage and film actress
- Elsie Fisher (born 2003), American actor
- Elsie Fox (c. 1900–1992), minor screenwriter in the 1930s, married to American novelist/screenwriter Paul Hervey Fox
- Elsie Herbold Froeschner (1913–2006), American scientific illustrator
- Elsie Gabriel, Indian environmentalist
- Elsie Gibbons (1903–2003), Canadian politician
- Elsie Giorgi (1911–1998), American physician
- Elsie Gledstanes (1891–1982), British artist
- Elsie Griffin (1895–1989), English opera singer
- Elsie Hall (1877–1976), Australian-born South African classical pianist
- Elsie Heiss, Australian indigenous elder and Catholic religious leader
- Elsie Higgon (1879–1969), English pharmacist
- Elsie Hodder (1886–1952), English actress and singer under the stage name Lily Elsie
- Elsie M. Hueffer (1876–1949), British translator
- Elsie Ao Ieong, Macau government minister
- Elsie Inglis (1864–1917), innovative Scottish doctor
- Elsie Janis (1889–1956), American singer, songwriter, actress, and screenwriter
- Elsie Jury (1910–1993), Canadian archaeologist
- Elsie S. Kanza, Tanzanian economist and diplomat
- Elsie Kelly (1936–2026), English actress
- Elsie May Kittredge (1870–1954), American botanist
- Elsie Caroline Krummeck (1913–1999), American artist and industrial designer
- Elsie Lefebvre (born 1979), Quebec politician
- Elsie Lessa (1912–2000), American-Brazilian journalist and writer
- Elsie Leung, member of the Executive Council of Hong Kong
- Elsie M. Lewis (1912–1992), first African American female historian
- Elsie Locke (1912–2001), New Zealand writer, historian, and activist in the feminism and peace movements
- Elsie Lyon, Canadian politician; see Cooperative Commonwealth Federation candidates, 1953 Manitoba provincial election#Elsie Lyon (Fisher)
- Elsie Mackay (c.1893–1928), British actress, interior decorator and pioneering aviator who died trying to fly across the Atlantic
- Elsie MacLeod, American actress
- Elsie Maréchal (1894–1969), English woman active in the Belgian Resistance during the Second World War
- Elsie Rosaline Masson (1890–1935), Australian photographer
- Elsie Smeaton Munro (1880–1961), Scottish writer
- Elsie Murray (1878–1965), American psychologist
- Elsie Napier, American politician
- Elsie Paitai (born 1963), New Zealand rugby union player
- Elsie Clews Parsons (1875–1941), American anthropologist, sociologist, folklorist and feminist
- Elsie Payne (1927–2004), teacher and first indigenous Barbadian principal of Queen's College of Bridgetown
- Elsie Palmer Payne (1884–1971), American painter
- Elsie Dodge Pattee (1876–1975), American painter
- Elsie Pidgeon (1879–1956), Australian hospital matron
- Elsie Quinlan (1914–1952), Irish-born South African Dominican sister
- Elsie Reasoner Ralph (1878–1913), American war correspondent and sculptor
- Elsie Robinson (1993–1956), American syndicated columnist
- Elsie Shrigley (1899–1978), English vegan activist and co-founder of The Vegan Society
- Elsie Sigel (c.1890–1909), American murder victim
- Elsie Snowden, member of the Snowden Family Band, a 19th-century African American musical group
- Elsie Stevens (born 1907), British artist
- Elsie Sunderland, Canadian environmental scientist
- Elsie Suréna (born 1956), Haitian writer and photographer
- Elsie Swensson (died 2004), American politician
- Elsie Toles (1888–1957), Arizona's superintendent of public instruction, professor, and author
- Elsie Tu (Traditional Chinese characters: 杜葉錫恩) (1913–2015), also known as Elsie Elliot, Hong Kong social activist and member of the Urban Council of Hong Kong
- Elsie Eleanor Verity (1894–1971), British motor engineer
- Elsie Wagg (1876–1949), English philanthropist
- Elsie Wayne (1932–2016), Canadian politician
- Elsie Widdowson (1906–2000), British dietitian
- Elsie Jane Wilson (1890–1965), New Zealand-born cinema actress, director and writer in the United States
- Elsie Wingrove (1923–2016), Canadian baseball player
- Elsie de Wolfe (1865–1950), pioneering professional interior decorator in the United States
- Elsie and Mathilde Wolff Van Sandau (fl. 1914), British suffragette sisters
- Elsie Maud White (1889–1978), New Zealand artist
- Elsie Wright (1901–1988), Cottingley Fairies photographer and subject

=== Short for another name ===
- Elizabeth Elsie Carlisle (1896–1977), English singer
- Elizabeth Elsie MacGill (1905–1980), Canadian aeronautical engineer, first woman to earn an aeronautical engineering degree and "Queen of the Hurricanes" (fighter aircraft)
- Eliška Elsie Paroubek (1906–1911), Czech-American girl who was kidnapped and murdered

== Fictional characters ==
- Elsie the Cow, an advertising mascot of the Borden Company
- Elsie Dinsmore, titular character in the Elsie Dinsmore series by Martha Finley
- Elsie Hooper, title character of the black and white horror serial of the same name, appearing in the UMass Daily Collegian
- Elsie Hughes, the housekeeper on the series Downton Abbey
- Elsie Lappin, on the British soap opera Coronation Street in 1960, the first to speak on the series
- Elsie Tanner, on the British soap opera Coronation Street

== See also ==
- Elzie E. C. Segar (1894–1938), American cartoonist, creator of Popeye
