= Wagg =

Wagg is a surname. Notable people with the surname include:

- Elsie Wagg (1876–1949), English philanthropist
- Graham Wagg (born 1983), English cricketer
- Kenneth Wagg (1909–2000), English rackets player, banker, and theatrical producer
- Lynette Wagg (born 1939), Australian sprint canoeist
- Maurice Wagg (1840-1926), British-born veteran of the American Civil War
- Tom Wagg (born 1997), English astrophysicist

== Fictional characters ==
- Jolyon Wagg, character in the comics series The Adventures of Tintin

== See also ==
- WAGG
