= List of the most popular names in the 1890s in the United States =

These are the most popular given names in the United States for all years of the 1890s.

== 1890 ==
- Males
  1. John
  2. William
  3. James
  4. George
  5. Charles
  6. Frank
  7. Joseph
  8. Robert
  9. Henry
  10. Harry
  11. Edward
  12. Thomas
  13. Walter
  14. Arthur
  15. Fred
  16. Albert
  17. Clarence
  18. Roy
  19. Louis
  20. Samuel
  21. Charlie
  22. Ernest
  23. Willie
  24. Earl
  25. Richard
  26. David
  27. Carl
  28. Joe
  29. Oscar
  30. Will
  31. Paul
  32. Ralph
  33. Jesse
  34. Andrew
  35. Alfred
  36. Raymond
  37. Benjamin
  38. Elmer
  39. Daniel
  40. Howard
  41. Sam
  42. Herbert
  43. Frederick
  44. Lee
  45. Peter
  46. Eugene
  47. Harold
  48. Michael
  49. Leo
  50. Herman
- Females
  1. Mary
  2. Anna
  3. Elizabeth
  4. Margaret
  5. Emma
  6. Florence
  7. Ethel
  8. Minnie
  9. Clara
  10. Bertha
  11. Bessie
  12. Helen
  13. Grace
  14. Alice
  15. Annie
  16. Ida
  17. Mabel
  18. Edna
  19. Lillian
  20. Nellie
  21. Sarah
  22. Martha
  23. Ella
  24. Pearl
  25. Rose
  26. Gertrude
  27. Laura
  28. Marie
  29. Carrie
  30. Edith
  31. Louise
  32. Eva
  33. Frances
  34. Myrtle
  35. Lillie
  36. Cora
  37. Hazel
  38. Hattie
  39. Maude
  40. Julia
  41. Jennie
  42. Mattie
  43. Jessie
  44. Catherine
  45. Elsie
  46. Ruth
  47. Lena
  48. Lula
  49. Josephine
  50. Agnes

== 1891 ==
- Males
  1. John
  2. William
  3. James
  4. George
  5. Charles
  6. Frank
  7. Joseph
  8. Robert
  9. Harry
  10. Henry
  11. Edward
  12. Thomas
  13. Walter
  14. Arthur
  15. Fred
  16. Albert
  17. Clarence
  18. Roy
  19. Louis
  20. Samuel
  21. Willie
  22. Ernest
  23. Charlie
  24. Carl
  25. Earl
  26. David
  27. Richard
  28. Ralph
  29. Joe
  30. Raymond
  31. Paul
  32. Oscar
  33. Andrew
  34. Will
  35. Jesse
  36. Elmer
  37. Daniel
  38. Herbert
  39. Alfred
  40. Howard
  41. Benjamin
  42. Harold
  43. Sam
  44. Frederick
  45. Peter
  46. Lawrence
  47. Herman
  48. Eugene
  49. Ray
  50. Lewis
- Females
  1. Mary
  2. Anna
  3. Margaret
  4. Elizabeth
  5. Emma
  6. Florence
  7. Ethel
  8. Minnie
  9. Helen
  10. Bertha
  11. Clara
  12. Bessie
  13. Annie
  14. Grace
  15. Mabel
  16. Alice
  17. Ida
  18. Edna
  19. Ruth
  20. Lillian
  21. Martha
  22. Rose
  23. Ella
  24. Sarah
  25. Nellie
  26. Gertrude
  27. Pearl
  28. Marie
  29. Edith
  30. Laura
  31. Myrtle
  32. Hazel
  33. Eva
  34. Frances
  35. Cora
  36. Carrie
  37. Louise
  38. Elsie
  39. Lille
  40. Jennie
  41. Catherine
  42. Hattie
  43. Julia
  44. Maude
  45. Lena
  46. Mattie
  47. Agnes
  48. Jessie
  49. Josephine
  50. Lula

== 1892 ==
- Males
  1. John
  2. William
  3. James
  4. George
  5. Charles
  6. Frank
  7. Joseph
  8. Robert
  9. Harry
  10. Henry
  11. Edward
  12. Thomas
  13. Walter
  14. Arthur
  15. Fred
  16. Albert
  17. Clarence
  18. Roy
  19. Willie
  20. Samuel
  21. Earl
  22. Louis
  23. Joe
  24. David
  25. Carl
  26. Ernest
  27. Richard
  28. Charlie
  29. Paul
  30. Ralph
  31. Raymond
  32. Andrew
  33. Oscar
  34. Will
  35. Jesse
  36. Elmer
  37. Harold
  38. Sam
  39. Howard
  40. Alfred
  41. Daniel
  42. Benjamin
  43. Herbert
  44. Lawrence
  45. Peter
  46. Lee
  47. Grover
  48. Frederick
  49. Leo
  50. Francis
- Females
  1. Mary
  2. Anna
  3. Elizabeth
  4. Margaret
  5. Ruth
  6. Florence
  7. Emma
  8. Ethel
  9. Helen
  10. Clara
  11. Bertha
  12. Minnie
  13. Bessie
  14. Alice
  15. Annie
  16. Grace
  17. Ida
  18. Edna
  19. Mabel
  20. Lillian
  21. Marie
  22. Rose
  23. Gertrude
  24. Martha
  25. Hazel
  26. Pearl
  27. Ella
  28. Sarah
  29. Laura
  30. Nellie
  31. Frances
  32. Myrtle
  33. Edith
  34. Eva
  35. Carrie
  36. Lillie
  37. Elsie
  38. Louise
  39. Cora
  40. Hattie
  41. Julia
  42. Catherine
  43. Agnes
  44. Mattie
  45. Maude
  46. Jessie
  47. Lena
  48. Jennie
  49. Josephine
  50. Ada

== 1893 ==
- Males
  1. John
  2. William
  3. James
  4. George
  5. Charles
  6. Joseph
  7. Frank
  8. Robert
  9. Edward
  10. Harry
  11. Henry
  12. Thomas
  13. Walter
  14. Arthur
  15. Fred
  16. Albert
  17. Clarence
  18. Roy
  19. Willie
  20. Samuel
  21. Earl
  22. Louis
  23. Ernest
  24. Carl
  25. Paul
  26. Richard
  27. David
  28. Joe
  29. Raymond
  30. Charlie
  31. Ralph
  32. Elmer
  33. Oscar
  34. Harold
  35. Howard
  36. Jesse
  37. Will
  38. Alfred
  39. Daniel
  40. Andrew
  41. Herbert
  42. Benjamin
  43. Sam
  44. Herman
  45. Leo
  46. Lee
  47. Frederick
  48. Francis
  49. Michael
  50. Jack
- Females
  1. Mary
  2. Anna
  3. Ruth
  4. Margaret
  5. Elizabeth
  6. Helen
  7. Florence
  8. Ethel
  9. Emma
  10. Bertha
  11. Clara
  12. Minnie
  13. Alice
  14. Edna
  15. Bessie
  16. Grace
  17. Annie
  18. Ida
  19. Marie
  20. Lillian
  21. Mabel
  22. Hazel
  23. Rose
  24. Gertrude
  25. Martha
  26. Pearl
  27. Nellie
  28. Ella
  29. Myrtle
  30. Edith
  31. Laura
  32. Eva
  33. Sarah
  34. Frances
  35. Elsie
  36. Carrie
  37. Louise
  38. Agnes
  39. Esther
  40. Julia
  41. Lillie
  42. Catherine
  43. Hattie
  44. Cora
  45. Jennie
  46. Lena
  47. Mattie
  48. Jessie
  49. Maude
  50. Josephine

== 1894 ==
- Males
  1. John
  2. William
  3. James
  4. George
  5. Charles
  6. Joseph
  7. Frank
  8. Robert
  9. Henry
  10. Harry
  11. Edward
  12. Thomas
  13. Walter
  14. Arthur
  15. Fred
  16. Albert
  17. Clarence
  18. Roy
  19. Willie
  20. Earl
  21. Louis
  22. Carl
  23. Paul
  24. Ernest
  25. Richard
  26. Samuel
  27. Raymond
  28. Joe
  29. David
  30. Charlie
  31. Ralph
  32. Harold
  33. Howard
  34. Oscar
  35. Andrew
  36. Herbert
  37. Elmer
  38. Jesse
  39. Will
  40. Alfred
  41. Daniel
  42. Leo
  43. Sam
  44. Benjamin
  45. Lee
  46. Floyd
  47. Jack
  48. Herman
  49. Lawrence
  50. Francis
- Females
  1. Mary
  2. Anna
  3. Margaret
  4. Helen
  5. Elizabeth
  6. Ruth
  7. Ethel
  8. Florence
  9. Emma
  10. Marie
  11. Clara
  12. Minnie
  13. Bessie
  14. Bertha
  15. Edna
  16. Lillian
  17. Alice
  18. Annie
  19. Grace
  20. Mabel
  21. Ida
  22. Rose
  23. Hazel
  24. Martha
  25. Gertrude
  26. Edith
  27. Myrtle
  28. Pearl
  29. Frances
  30. Nellie
  31. Ella
  32. Laura
  33. Elsie
  34. Sarah
  35. Eva
  36. Esther
  37. Louise
  38. Agnes
  39. Carrie
  40. Lillie
  41. Catherine
  42. Lena
  43. Irene
  44. Hattie
  45. Julia
  46. Cora
  47. Gladys
  48. Josephine
  49. Mattie
  50. Mildred

== 1895 ==
- Males
  1. John
  2. William
  3. James
  4. George
  5. Charles
  6. Frank
  7. Joseph
  8. Robert
  9. Henry
  10. Edward
  11. Thomas
  12. Harry
  13. Walter
  14. Arthur
  15. Fred
  16. Albert
  17. Clarence
  18. Willie
  19. Roy
  20. Paul
  21. Louis
  22. Carl
  23. Earl
  24. Ernest
  25. Samuel
  26. Raymond
  27. Charlie
  28. Joe
  29. Harold
  30. Ralph
  31. Richard
  32. David
  33. Howard
  34. Elmer
  35. Jesse
  36. Herbert
  37. Andrew
  38. Alfred
  39. Oscar
  40. Daniel
  41. Lawrence
  42. Leo
  43. Sam
  44. Will
  45. Francis
  46. Lack
  47. Lee
  48. Benjamin
  49. Herman
  50. Eugene
- Females
  1. Mary
  2. Anna
  3. Helen
  4. Margaret
  5. Elizabeth
  6. Ruth
  7. Florence
  8. Ethel
  9. Marie
  10. Emma
  11. Bertha
  12. Clara
  13. Minnie
  14. Edna
  15. Bessie
  16. Lillian
  17. Alice
  18. Grace
  19. Annie
  20. Mabel
  21. Rose
  22. Hazel
  23. Ida
  24. Gertrude
  25. Martha
  26. Pearl
  27. Edith
  28. Myrtle
  29. Frances
  30. Nellie
  31. Esther
  32. Elsie
  33. Sarah
  34. Eva
  35. Ella
  36. Laura
  37. Louise
  38. Catherine
  39. Mildred
  40. Agnes
  41. Gladys
  42. Carrie
  43. Irene
  44. Lillie
  45. Julia
  46. Hattie
  47. Josephine
  48. Jessie
  49. Cora
  50. Lena

== 1896 ==
- Males
  1. John
  2. William
  3. James
  4. George
  5. Charles
  6. Joseph
  7. Frank
  8. Robert
  9. Edward
  10. Henry
  11. Harry
  12. Thomas
  13. Walter
  14. Arthur
  15. Albert
  16. Fred
  17. Clarence
  18. Willie
  19. Roy
  20. Paul
  21. Earl
  22. Louis
  23. Harold
  24. Raymond
  25. Carl
  26. Richard
  27. Joe
  28. David
  29. Ernest
  30. Ralph
  31. Samuel
  32. Charlie
  33. Howard
  34. Herbert
  35. Jesse
  36. Elmer
  37. Andrew
  38. Daniel
  39. Francis
  40. Jack
  41. Oscar
  42. Alfred
  43. Sam
  44. Will
  45. Eugene
  46. Lawrence
  47. Leo
  48. Lee
  49. Herman
  50. Ray
- Females
  1. Mary
  2. Anna
  3. Helen
  4. Margaret
  5. Ruth
  6. Ethel
  7. Elizabeth
  8. Florence
  9. Marie
  10. Emma
  11. Lillian
  12. Alice
  13. Edna
  14. Clara
  15. Bertha
  16. Minnie
  17. Grace
  18. Bessie
  19. Annie
  20. Rose
  21. Mabel
  22. Hazel
  23. Gertrude
  24. Ida
  25. Pearl
  26. Martha
  27. Esther
  28. Frances
  29. Edith
  30. Myrtle
  31. Elsie
  32. Eva
  33. Gladys
  34. Nellie
  35. Sarah
  36. Ella
  37. Laura
  38. Agnes
  39. Mildred
  40. Catherine
  41. Irene
  42. Louise
  43. Lillie
  44. Julia
  45. Carrie
  46. Dorothy
  47. Hattie
  48. Lena
  49. Mattie
  50. Josephine

== 1897 ==
- Males
  1. John
  2. William
  3. James
  4. George
  5. Charles
  6. Joseph
  7. Frank
  8. Robert
  9. Edward
  10. Henry
  11. Thomas
  12. Walter
  13. Harry
  14. Arthur
  15. Albert
  16. Fred
  17. Clarence
  18. Willie
  19. Roy
  20. Paul
  21. Harold
  22. Raymond
  23. Louis
  24. Earl
  25. Carl
  26. Joe
  27. Ernest
  28. Damuel
  29. David
  30. Charlie
  31. Richard
  32. Ralph
  33. Howard
  34. Elmer
  35. Herbert
  36. Andrew
  37. Oscar
  38. Jesse
  39. Daniel
  40. Alfred
  41. Lawrence
  42. Jack
  43. Francis
  44. Will
  45. Sam
  46. Leo
  47. Lee
  48. Floyd
  49. Eugene
  50. Herman
- Females
  1. Mary
  2. Anna
  3. Helen
  4. Margaret
  5. Ruth
  6. Elizabeth
  7. Florence
  8. Ethel
  9. Marie
  10. Emma
  11. Lillian
  12. Edna
  13. Bertha
  14. Grace
  15. Clara
  16. Alice
  17. Bessie
  18. Hazel
  19. Rose
  20. Annie
  21. Minnie
  22. Mabel
  23. Gertrude
  24. Ida
  25. Pearl
  26. Martha
  27. Frances
  28. Esther
  29. Myrtle
  30. Edith
  31. Elsie
  32. Gladys
  33. Mildred
  34. Sarah
  35. Eva
  36. Ella
  37. Nellie
  38. Irene
  39. Laura
  40. Agnes
  41. Louise
  42. Catherine
  43. Dorothy
  44. Lillie
  45. Julia
  46. Carrie
  47. Josephine
  48. Hattie
  49. Cora
  50. Lena

== 1898 ==
- Males
  1. John
  2. William
  3. James
  4. George
  5. Charles
  6. Joseph
  7. Robert
  8. Frank
  9. Edward
  10. Thomas
  11. Henry
  12. Harry
  13. Walter
  14. Arthur
  15. Fred
  16. Albert
  17. Clarence
  18. Willie
  19. Dewey
  20. Roy
  21. Paul
  22. Harold
  23. Raymond
  24. Carl
  25. Earl
  26. Richard
  27. Louis
  28. Ernest
  29. Joe
  30. David
  31. Ralph
  32. Samuel
  33. Charlie
  34. Herbert
  35. Howard
  36. Alfred
  37. Jack
  38. Andrew
  39. Leo
  40. Elmer
  41. Oscar
  42. Sam
  43. Francis
  44. Lawrence
  45. Daniel
  46. Lee
  47. Jesse
  48. Will
  49. Eugene
  50. Herman
- Females
  1. Mary
  2. Anna
  3. Helen
  4. Margaret
  5. Ruth
  6. Florence
  7. Elizabeth
  8. Ethel
  9. Marie
  10. Lillian
  11. Alice
  12. Edna
  13. Emma
  14. Clara
  15. Grace
  16. Bessie
  17. Bertha
  18. Annie
  19. Hazel
  20. Rose
  21. Minnie
  22. Frances
  23. Mabel
  24. Gertrude
  25. Martha
  26. Pearl
  27. Gladys
  28. Mildred
  29. Ida
  30. Myrtle
  31. Esther
  32. Edith
  33. Elsie
  34. Irene
  35. Eva
  36. Nellie
  37. Sarah
  38. Laura
  39. Ella
  40. Agnes
  41. Catherine
  42. Louise
  43. Dorothy
  44. Lillie
  45. Julia
  46. Josephine
  47. Carrie
  48. Hattie
  49. Lena
  50. Mattie

== 1899 ==
- Males
  1. John
  2. William
  3. James
  4. George
  5. Charles
  6. Joseph
  7. Robert
  8. Frank
  9. Edward
  10. Henry
  11. Thomas
  12. Walter
  13. Harry
  14. Arthur
  15. Albert
  16. Fred
  17. Clarence
  18. Willie
  19. Harold
  20. Roy
  21. Paul
  22. Raymond
  23. Earl
  24. Joe
  25. Carl
  26. Louis
  27. Ernest
  28. Richard
  29. Ralph
  30. Samuel
  31. Charlie
  32. David
  33. Herbert
  34. Howard
  35. Jack
  36. Andrew
  37. Elmer
  38. Francis
  39. Dewey
  40. Lawrence
  41. Alfred
  42. Daniel
  43. Leo
  44. Sam
  45. Eugene
  46. Oscar
  47. Jesse
  48. Will
  49. Herman
  50. Lee
- Females
  1. Mary
  2. Anna
  3. Helen
  4. Margaret
  5. Ruth
  6. Florence
  7. Elizabeth
  8. Marie
  9. Ethel
  10. Lillian
  11. Edna
  12. Alice
  13. Emma
  14. Clara
  15. Grace
  16. Bertha
  17. Mildred
  18. Annie
  19. Bessie
  20. Gladys
  21. Rose
  22. Mabel
  23. Gertrude
  24. Frances
  25. Minnie
  26. Hazel
  27. Pearl
  28. Martha
  29. Esther
  30. Myrtle
  31. Ida
  32. Edith
  33. Elsie
  34. Irene
  35. Dorothy
  36. Catherine
  37. Agnes
  38. Sarah
  39. Eva
  40. Louise
  41. Nellie
  42. Ella
  43. Laura
  44. Josephine
  45. Lillie
  46. Carrie
  47. Julia
  48. Mattie
  49. Lena
  50. Viola

== See also ==
- Popularity of birth names for females (United States)
