= Home! Sweet Home! =

Song

"Home, Sweet Home"
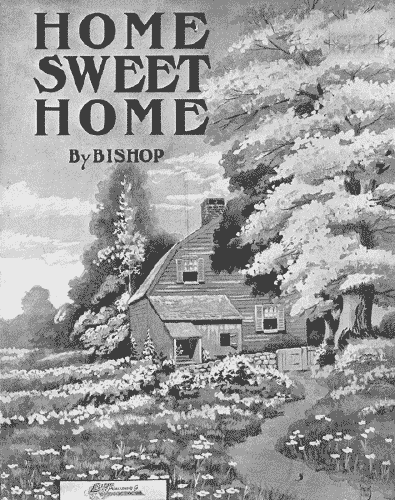
- Cover of the sheet music for a version published in 1914.

Song
- Language: English
- Published: 1823 by Goulding, D'Almaine & Co.
- Composer: Henry Bishop
- Lyricist: John Howard Payne

Home! Sweet Home!

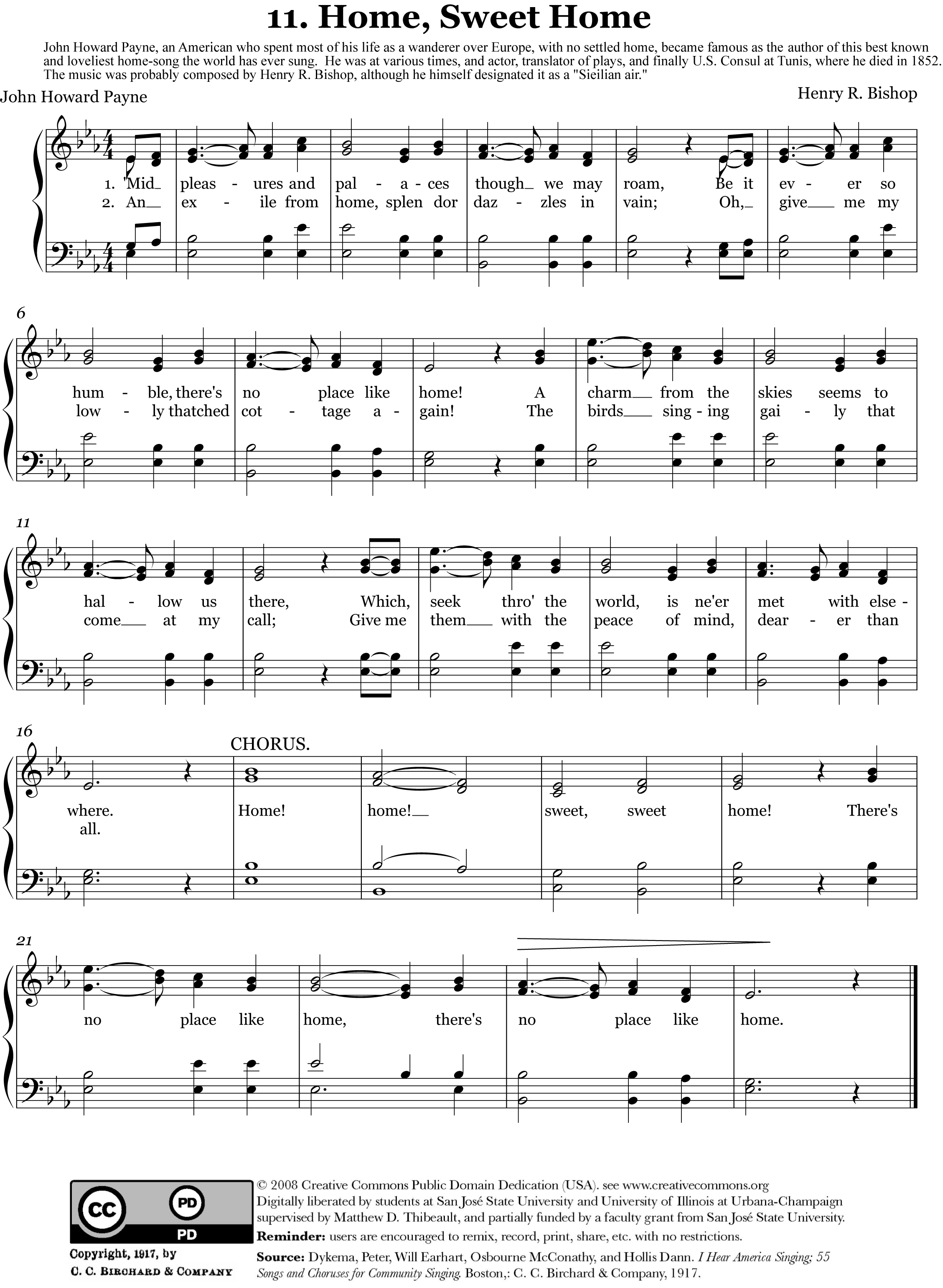
Sheet music version.

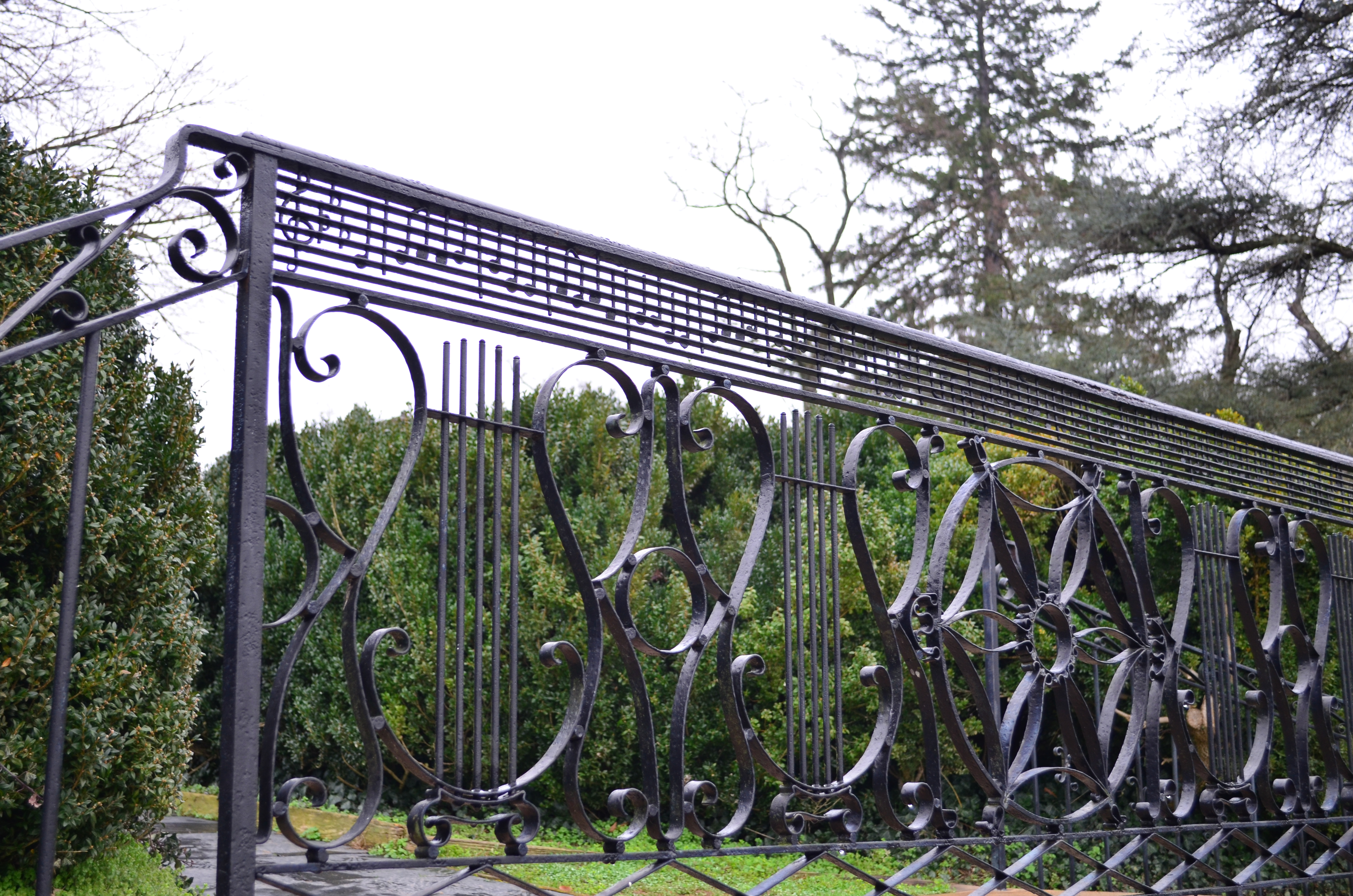
Wrought iron railing with the music of the song "Home Sweet Home" in Fredericksburg, Virginia

"Home! Sweet Home!" is a song adapted from American actor and dramatist John Howard Payne's 1823 opera Clari, or the Maid of Milan. The song's melody was composed by Englishman Henry Bishop with lyrics by Payne. Bishop had earlier published a more elaborate version of this melody, naming it "A Sicilian Air", but he later confessed to having written it himself.

== Lyrics ==
The song's lyrics are:

Mid pleasures and palaces though we may roam
Be it ever so humble, there's no place like home
A charm from the skies seems to hallow us there
Which seek thro' the world, is ne'er met elsewhere
Home! Home!
Sweet, sweet home!
There's no place like home!
There's no place like home!

An exile from home splendor dazzles in vain
Oh give me my lowly thatched cottage again
The birds singing gaily that came at my call
And gave me the peace of mind dearer than all
Home! Home!
Sweet, sweet home!
There's no place like home!
There's no place like home!

== History ==
When the song was published separately, it quickly sold 100,000 copies. The publishers made a considerable profit from it, net £2,100 in the first year, and the producer of the opera did well. Only Payne did not really profit by its success. "While his money lasted, he was a prince of bohemians", but he had little business sense. The song's American premiere took place at the Winter Tivoli Theatre in Philadelphia on October 29, 1823, and was sung by "Mrs. Williams." In 1852, Henry Bishop "relaunched" the song as a parlour ballad, and it became very popular in the United States throughout the American Civil War and after.

As early as 1827, this song was quoted by Swedish composer Franz Berwald in his Konzertstück for Bassoon and Orchestra (middle section, marked Andante). Gaetano Donizetti used the theme in his opera Anna Bolena (1830) Act 2, Scene 3 as part of Anna's Mad Scene to underscore her longing for her childhood home. It is also used with Sir Henry Wood's Fantasia on British Sea Songs and in Alexandre Guilmant's Fantasy for organ Op. 43, the Fantaisie sur deux mélodies anglaises, both of which also use "Rule, Britannia!". In 1857, composer/pianist Sigismond Thalberg wrote a series of variations for piano (op. 72) on the theme of "Home! Sweet Home!".

The song was reputedly banned from being played in Union Army camps during the American Civil War for being too redolent of hearth and home and so likely to incite desertion.

It was a favorite of Nellie Melba and Adelina Patti, both of whom used the song as an encore piece.

In 1926, a "Music Stair" railing (see image) at Chatham Manor in Fredericksburg, Virginia was designed by Washington, D.C.–based architect Oliver H. Clarke for the homeowners, the Devores. The ornamental iron railing features the first few bars of the score to “Home, Sweet Home.”

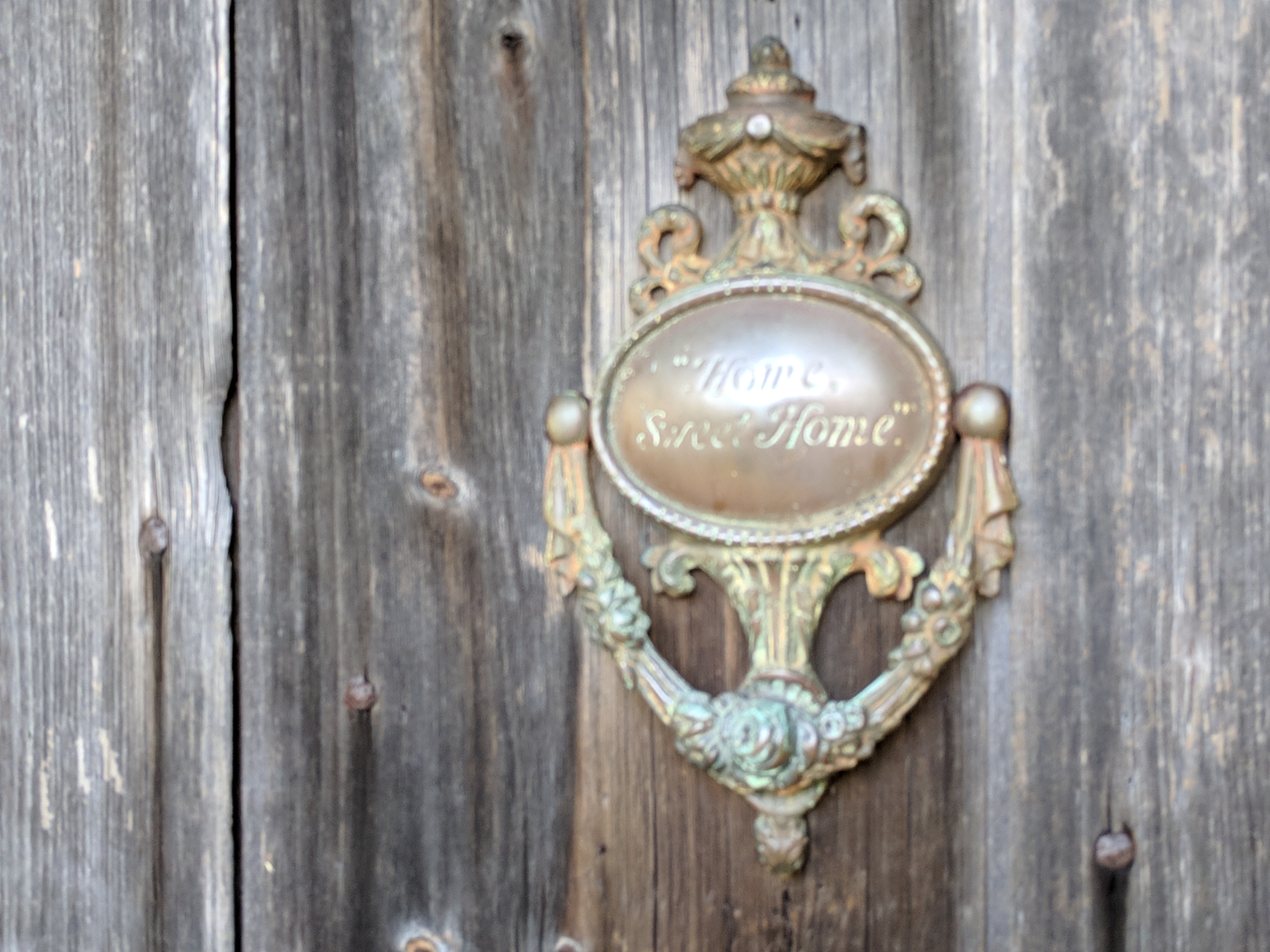
Home Sweet Home door knocker

The Village of East Hampton acquired Payne's grandfather's seventeenth-century house, known as "Home Sweet Home," and the windmill behind it, converting the homestead into a living museum in the landmarked East Hampton Village District.

The song is known in Japan as "Hanyū no Yado" ("埴生の宿") ("My Humble Cottage"). It has been used in such movies as The Burmese Harp and Grave of the Fireflies. It is also used at Minoh-Kayano Station on the Kita-Osaka Kyūkō Railway.

Bishop's tune, though, is perhaps most commonly recognized in the score from MGM's The Wizard of Oz. The melody is played in a counterpart to "Over the Rainbow" in the final scene as Dorothy (played by Judy Garland), after she had returned from the Land of Oz, tells her family, "there's no place like home".

In the 1939 film First Love, the song is performed by Deanna Durbin.

In the 1946 20th Century Fox film Anna and the King of Siam, as well as in Rodgers and Hammerstein's 1951 musical, The King and I (and its 1956 film adaptation), Anna Leonowens teaches her students to sing "Home! Sweet Home" as part of her psychological campaign to induce the King to build her a house of her own.

The 1955 Disney animated film Lady and the Tramp features a dog-howling rendition of the song.

== Notable recordings ==
Popular recordings were made by John Yorke AtLee (1891), Harry Macdonough (1902), Richard Jose (1906), Alma Gluck (1912), Alice Nielsen (1915) and Elsie West Baker (1915).

Later recordings were made by Deanna Durbin (recorded July 7, 1939 for Decca Records, catalog No. 2758B), Vera Lynn (1941) and by Bing Crosby (recorded July 30, 1945 with Victor Young and His Orchestra). The Crosby version was included in his album Auld Lang Syne (1948).

Joan Sutherland recorded it in 1962 as part of the two-disc recital album Command Performance and sang it at her two stage farewells in 1990, the first at the Sydney Opera House, the second at the Royal Opera House, Covent Garden. Katherine Jenkins included the song in her album Home Sweet Home (2014).
