= John M. M. Munro =

Scottish businessman and electrical engineer

John Mackintosh Mackay Munro FRSE MIME MICE (1853-1925) was a Scottish businessman and electrical engineer.

== Life ==
He was born in Glasgow in 1853 the son of David Munro, engineer, who had founded Munro & Anderson in 1840. The family lived at 55 Malta Street. He was educated at Glasgow Academy then studied at Anderson's College.

In March 1880 he tried to set up a telephone exchange in Glasgow, but abandoned the project due to "patent difficulties". If successful this would have been one of the first exchanges in Britain.

In 1894 he was elected a Fellow of the Royal Society of Edinburgh. His proposers were William Thomson, Lord Kelvin, James Thomson Bottomley, Magnus Maclean, and Alexander Galt.

In 1906 he became Chairman of the Institute of Electrical Engineers.

Up until 1910 he lived at Hawarden, 59 Partickhill Road then moved to Blythswood Square for his final years. In that year, following the death of his father, he became Director and Partner in Anderson & Munro.

He died on 29 December 1925.

== Family ==
He was father to Donald Smeaton Munro (b.1879), who also became an engineer and was involved in converting Edinburgh's gas lights to electricity. His daughter Elsie Smeaton Munro (1880–1961) became a writer; and his son Ion was a diplomat and journalist, as well as a collector of rare books.
