= Georgia's 177th House of Representatives district =

State district in Georgia, USA

Georgia's 177th State House of Representatives district
Representative
Alvin Payton; D
- Demographics: 36.8% White; 54.9% Black; 4.8% Hispanic; 1.8% Asian
- Population: 55,824

District 177 elects one member of the Georgia House of Representatives. It contains parts of Lowndes County.

== Members ==
- Mark Hatfield (2005–2013)
- Dexter Sharper (2013–2026)
- Alvin Payton (2026–2027)
- Elsie Napier (2027–)
