= Alan Sinclair (scientist) =

English clinical scientist (born 1952)

Professor Alan J. Sinclair
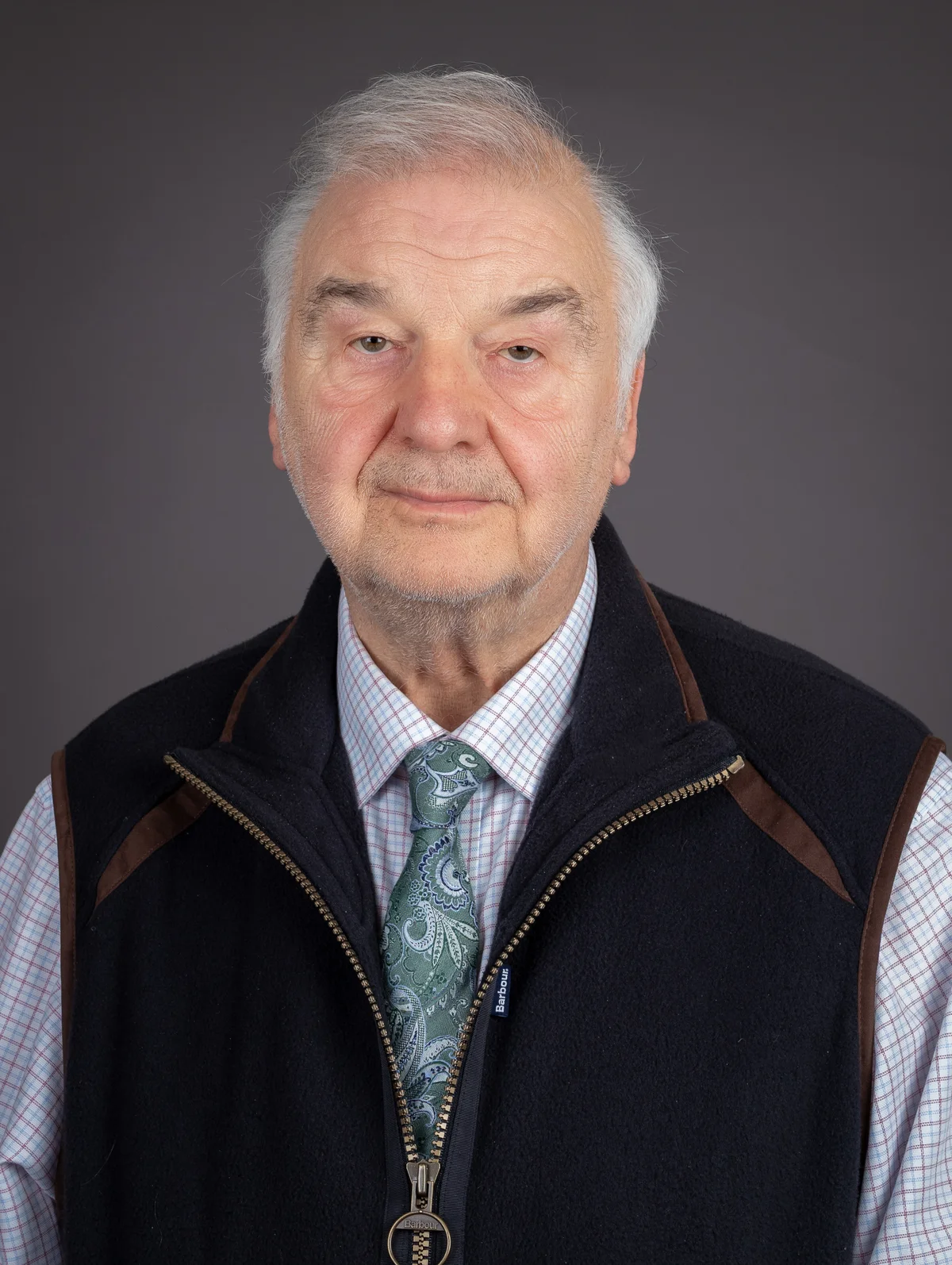
- Sinclair in 2026
- Born: Alan James Sinclair; June 3, 1952; Newcastle-under-Lyme
- Occupations: Diabetologist; Clinical Scientist; Clinical Gerontologist
- Known for: Global Leadership in Geriatric Diabetes
- Scientific career
- Workplaces: Foundation of Diabetes Research in Older People (fDROP); King's College, London, UK; European Diabetes Working Party in Older People (EDWPOP); International Geriatric Diabetes Society (IGDS)

Alan James Sinclair is a British physician and academic specializing in diabetes in older people, geriatric medicine and frailty. He is a Visiting Professor in Diabetes Care at King’s College London and Director of the Foundation for Diabetes Research in Older People (fDROP). He is known for his work in the development of clinical guidelines, research translation and service delivery for older-people’s diabetes.

== Early life ==
He was born in Newcastle-under-Lyme and was a pupil at Newcastle High School where he played rugby and cricket for the school, which he left in 1972.

=== Education ===
He earned a first-class honours BSc in Biochemistry from the University of London in 1976, followed by an MB BS from St Bartholomew’s Hospital Medical College, University of London, in 1979. He obtained his MD from the University of London in 1992 (thesis: Ascorbic acid metabolism and free radical activity in human and experimental models of diabetes mellitus) and an MSc in Medicine from the University of Sydney in 1993 (thesis: Primate and Rat Models of Streptozotocin-induced insulin-dependent diabetes mellitus: their use in the study of ascorbic acid metabolism in diabetes). He holds specialist recognition from the General Medical Council in geriatric medicine, general internal medicine, and diabetes/endocrinology (1995).

== Career ==
Sinclair has held senior academic and clinical appointments in several UK universities and NHS trusts. He was Professor of Medicine and Dean at the Bedfordshire & Hertfordshire Postgraduate Medical School and the University of Bedfordshire, and served as Honorary Consultant Geriatrician and Diabetologist. He later became Visiting Chair in Metabolic Medicine at Aston University (2017 – 2020) and Visiting Professor in Diabetes Care at King’s College London (from 2018 onward). He founded the Institute of Diabetes for Older People (IDOP) in 2008 and has served as Director of fDROP (2014 onward), a UK organisation dedicated to research, education and policy in diabetes and older people. In the NHS clinical arena, he has held roles such as Director of Diabetes Frail Ltd (from June 2014 to July 2020) and Honorary Consultant Physician in Diabetes at Birmingham Heartlands Hospital (2016 onward).

Sinclair has a long record of leadership in service development, professional education, national strategy, and international guideline development. He served as the first National Clinical Lead for Diabetes in Older People appointed by the Department of Health (UK)/NHS-Diabetes in England.

He has chaired the European Diabetes Working Party for Older People (EDWPOP) for nearly 15 years, producing four sets of international clinical guidelines on diabetes in older people. He has advised numerous institutions including the National Institute for Health and Care Excellence (NICE), Diabetes UK, the British Geriatrics Society, the Care Quality Commission, and international bodies such as the World Health Organization (WHO) and the International Association of Gerontology & Geriatrics (IAGG).

== Research ==
Sinclair has examined the use of technology in diabetes management for older adults, including continuous glucose monitoring, insulin pumps, and automated insulin delivery systems, noting that age-related limitations may require tailored education and support. His work has influenced international guidelines and policy, including advocacy for frailty as a care indicator in older adults with diabetes.

He has chaired and contributed to networks such as the European Diabetes Working Party for Older People (EDWPOP) and the Foundation for Diabetes Research in Older People (fDROP) / Diabetes Frail platform, focusing on clinical and translational research.

Sinclair has also investigated personalized therapeutic strategies, including the appropriate use of SGLT-2 inhibitors or GLP-1 receptor agonists and the de-intensification of hypoglycemic therapy in malnourished or frail individuals. His research further explores the interactions between multimorbidity, frailty, and diabetes in older adults, highlighting their impact on outcomes and care needs.

== Awards ==
Sinclair received the IAGG Presidential Medal in 2013, the highest honour the IAGG awards to a clinician scientist. He is a Fellow of the Royal College of Physicians FRCP Lond) and a former Fellow of the Royal College of Physicians of Edinburgh (FRCP Edin).
