= Spiritualist art =

Form of art

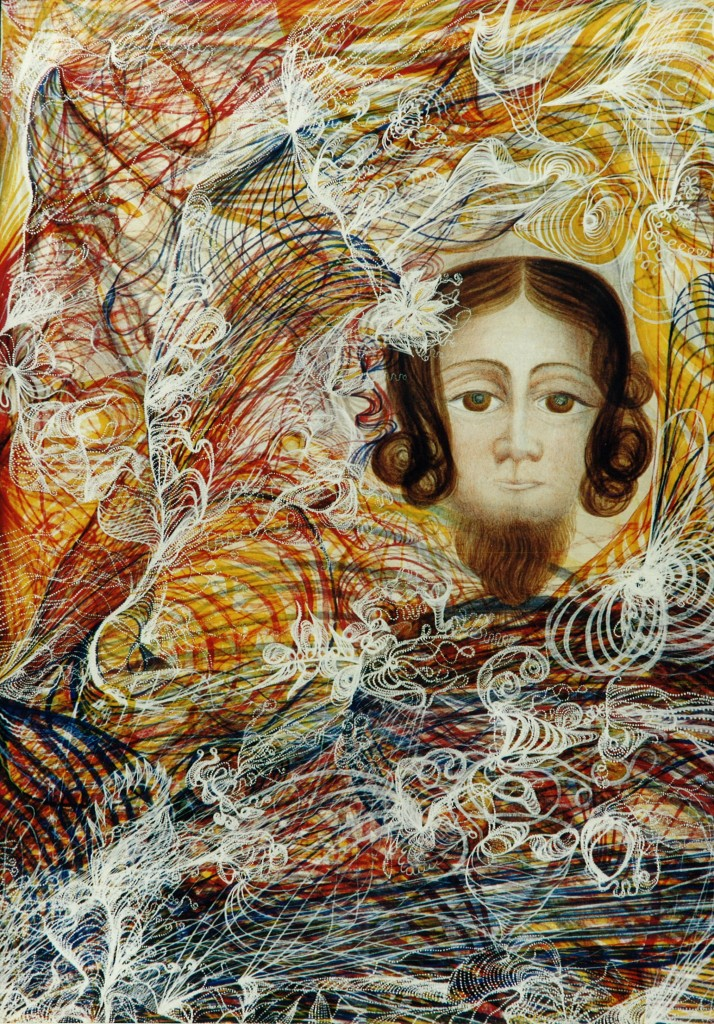
The Portrait of the Lord Jesus Christ by Georgiana Houghton

Spiritualist art or spirit art or mediumistic art or psychic painting is a form of art, mainly painting, influenced by spiritualism. Spiritualism influenced art, having an influence on artistic consciousness, with spiritual art having a huge impact on what became modernism and therefore art today.

Famous spiritual artists include Georgiana Houghton, Hilma af Klint, Augustin Lesage and Fleury Joseph Crépin.

Spiritualism also inspired the pioneering abstract art of František Kupka, Piet Mondrian, Vasily Kandinsky and Kasimir Malevich.

== Precipitated paintings ==
"Precipitation" is works of art that appeared on canvas, ostensibly without the use of human hands, during a Spiritualist seance. In this case, the mediums claimed that the spirits produced the paintings directly, rather than by guiding the hands of a human artist.

== Automatic drawing ==
Automatic drawings (distinguished from surrealist automatism), a term thought to originate with Anna Mary Howitt, were produced by mediums and practitioners of the psychic arts. It was thought by Spiritualists to be a spirit control that was producing the drawing while physically taking control of the medium’s body. An alternative term for this is psychic painting.

In Brazil, among the various alleged mediums that stand out in this particular area, the names of Luiz Antonio Gasparetto, José Medrado, Marilusa Moreira Vasconcelos and Florêncio Anton, among others.

== Portraying the spirits ==
In the heyday of Spiritualism, it became very common for mediums to sketch portraits of spirits who they claimed were present during the seances.

== Auragraphs ==
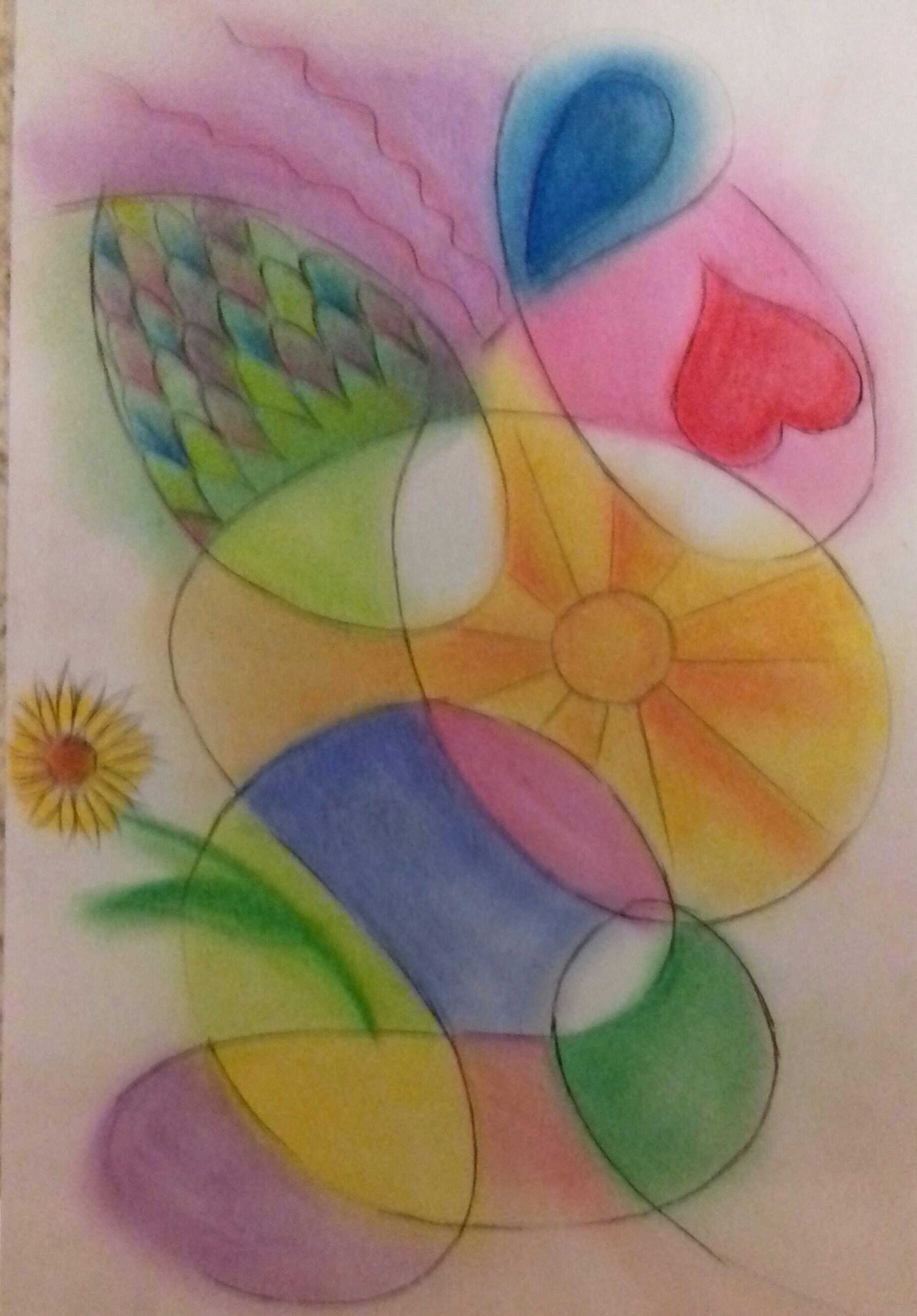
Auragraph

Auragraphs, which represent a person’s past, present, and potential as seen by a medium or clairvoyant. The name was coined, and the technique developed, by British medium Harold Sharp (1890-1980).

== Spirit architecture ==
The Iulia Hasdeu Castle is a folly built in the form of a small castle by historian and politician Bogdan Petriceicu Hașdeu in the city of Câmpina, Romania. He claimed that his dead daughter, Iulia Hasdeu, provided the plans for building the castle during sessions of spiritism.

In the 1880s, Senator Federico Rosazza (1813-1899), an Italian politician connected with Masonic and spiritualist circles, commissioned the painter and architect Giuseppe Maffei (1821-1901), to convert a pre-existing village into a new town with his name, Rosazza. Maffei, a spiritualist, claimed that he received messages on how to build Rosazza from the spirits, including Saint Augustine.

== See also ==
- Automatic writing
- Religious art
- Spirit photography
- Surrealist automatism
- Thoughtography
