= The Ghosts of Hanley House =

- Theatrical release poster
- Directed by: Louise Sherrill
- Written by: Louise Sherrill (writer)
- Produced by: Joseph Durkin Jr. (producer)
- Starring: Elsie Baker; Barbara Chase; Wilkie de Martel; Roberta Reeves; Cliff Scott; Leonard Shoemaker
- Cinematography: Claude Fullerton
- Edited by: Frances Durkin
- Music by: David C. Parsons
- Production company: Victoria Productions
- Distributed by: Sinister Cinema (VHS)
- Release date: 1968
- Running time: 85 minutes
- Country: United States
- Language: English

The Ghosts of Hanley House is a 1968 American horror film written and directed by Louise Sherrill.

== Plot ==
A young man accepts a bet to stay in a house with some friends, where several murders have occurred. However, the house may be haunted, or the original murderer could still be lurking nearby.

== Cast ==
- Elsie Baker as Lucy
- Barbara Chase as Sheila
- Roberta Reeves as Gabby

== Release ==
=== Home media ===
The film was released for the first time on DVD by Alpha Video on March 23, 2004.

=== Critical response ===
The Ghosts of Hanley House was not reviewed by mainstream critics. Reviews that exist of the film have been mostly negative.

On his website Fantastic Movie Musings and Ramblings, Dave Sindelar criticized the film's acting and direction as abysmal, and also criticized the inconsistent sound and lighting, as well as the slow pacing. Wes R. from Oh, the Horror! called the film "extremely bland", also writing, "A film like this would have been understandable in the 50s, but by 1968, you’d think that the filmmakers could’ve at least tried a little bit harder to make a halfway interesting and watchable film." Steve Langton from The Spinning Image gave the film 1/10 stars, writing, "Louise Sherrill’s ‘regional’ horror film (...) is so inept it turns Edward D. Wood Jr into Stanley Kubrick. The acting, photography and lighting are wretched in the extreme, with talking heads gazing uneasily past the camera, uttering inane lines of dialogue while the plot lurches from the sublime to the painfully ridiculous, using visual references to The Haunting in search of any vestige of credibility."
