= Alvin Payton =

American politician

Member of the Georgia House of Representatives from the 177th district
- In office June 16, 2026 – January 11, 2027
- Preceded by: Dexter Sharper
- Succeeded by: Elsie Napier

Personal details
- Born: Valdosta, Georgia
- Party: Democratic

Alvin Payton Jr. is an American politician who is a member of the Georgia House of Representatives, representing the 177th district. A Democrat, he won a 2026 special election to fill the vacancy left by Democrat Dexter Sharper's resignation on March 9, 2026. He was mayor of Valdosta, Georgia and a member of City Council.
