= Dexter Sharper =

American politician (born 1971)

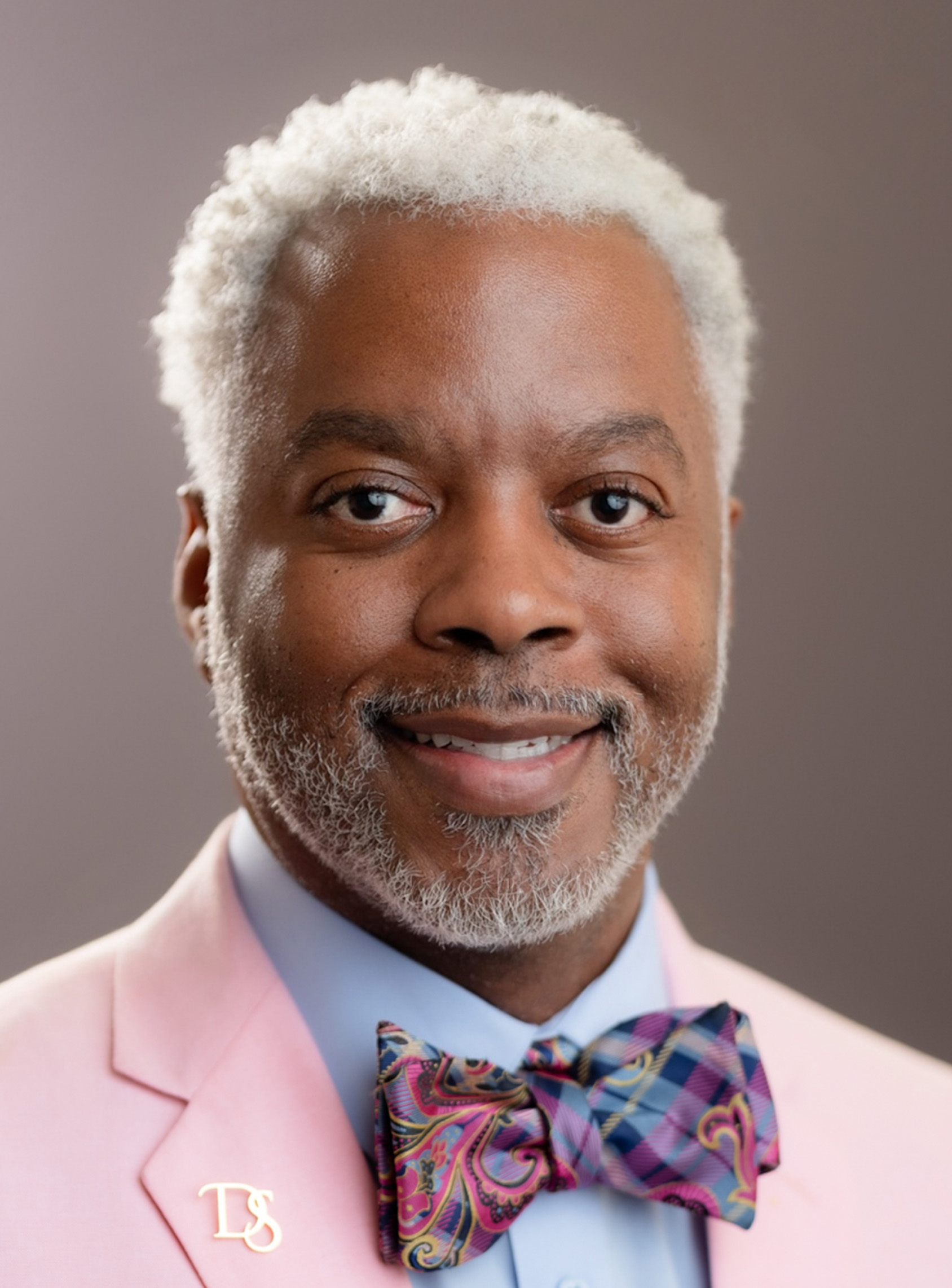
- Official portrait, 2013

Member of the Georgia House of Representatives from the 177th district
- In office January 14, 2013 – March 9, 2026
- Preceded by: Mark Hatfield
- Succeeded by: Alvin Payton

Personal details
- Born: July 9, 1971 (age 55) Valdosta, Georgia
- Party: Democratic

Dexter Lenorris Sharper (born July 9, 1971) is an American politician who served in the Georgia House of Representatives, representing the 177th district from 2013 to 2026.

In 2025, Sharper voted in favor of a bill banning transgender female students from participating in girls’ sports at school, striking all references to genders from the state code, and banning gender-affirming care for those held in state prisons.

Sharper resigned from the Georgia House of Representatives in March 2026 after being charged with fraud related to unemployment funds obtained during the COVID-19 pandemic.
