= William Watkiss Lloyd =

English writer (1813–1893)

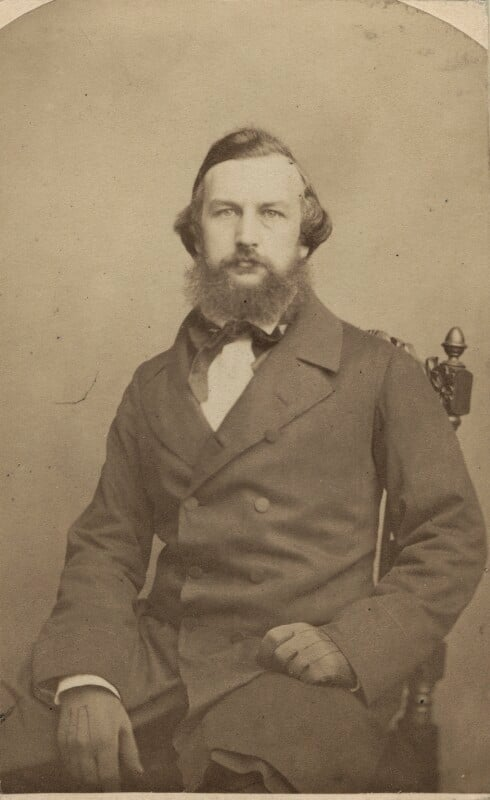
Lloyd in the early 1860s

William Watkiss Lloyd (11 March 1813 – 22 December 1893) was an English writer with wide interests. These included fine art, architecture, archaeology, Shakespeare, and classical and modern languages and literature.

== Life ==
Lloyd was born at Homerton, then in Middlesex, and educated at Newcastle-under-Lyme High School. At the age of 15 he entered a family tobacco business in London, where he remained until his retirement in 1864. In 1868 he married Ellen Brooker Beale (died 1900). He died in London.

== Works ==
The work for which Lloyd is best known is The Age of Pericles (1875), which is notable for its scholarship and appreciation of its period, but hampered by a difficult and at times obscure style. He also wrote:

- Xanthian Marbles (1845)
- Critical Essays upon Shakespeare's Plays (1875)
- Christianity in the Cartoons [of Raphael] (1865), which excited considerable attention from the way in which theological questions were discussed.
- The History of Sicily to the Athenian War with elucidations of the Sicilian odes of Pindar (1872)
- Panics and their Panaceas (1869)
- An edition of Much Ado about Nothing, "now first published in fully recovered metrical form" (1884) – the author held that all the plays were originally written throughout in blank verse.

A number of his manuscripts remain unpublished. The most important of these were bequeathed to the British Museum, including:

- A Further History of Greece
- The Century of Michaelangelo
- The Neo-Platonists

These are discussed in a "Memoir" by Sophia Beale, prefixed to Lloyd's posthumously published Elijah Fenton: his Poetry and Friends (1894), which contains a list of his published and unpublished works.
