= Newcastle-under-Lyme School =

Independent school in Staffordshire, England

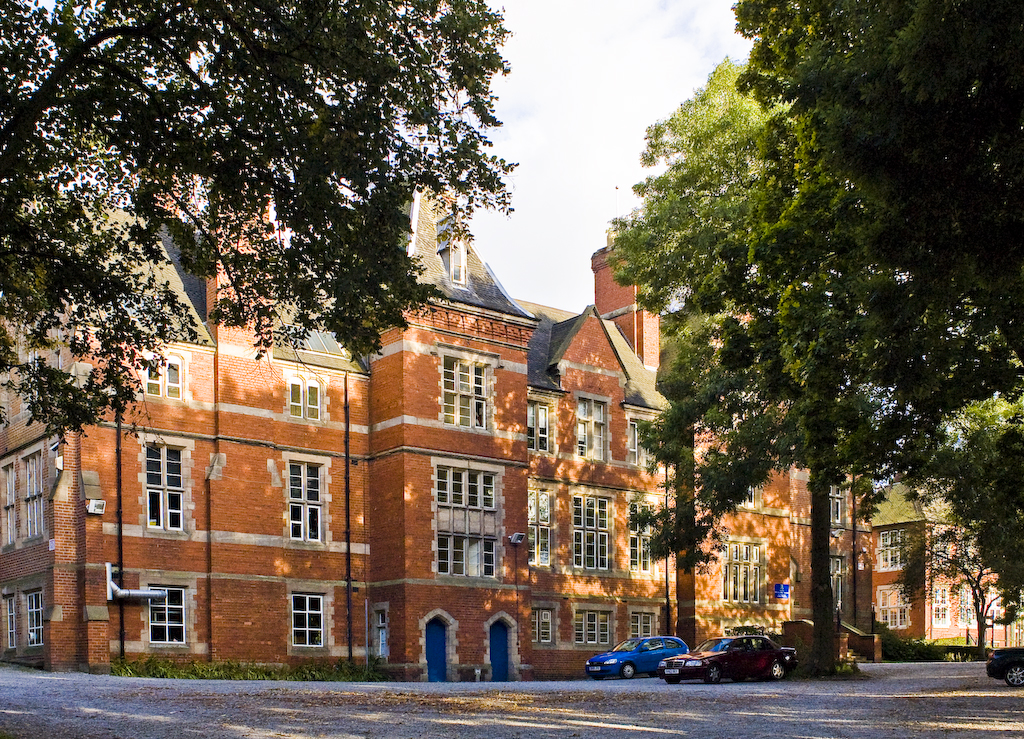

Location
- Mount Pleasant; Newcastle-under-Lyme, Staffordshire, ST5 1DB; England; 53°00′37″N 2°13′04″W

Information
- Type: Private day school
- Motto: Nunquam Non Nova, Summa Sequendo (Usually said as: Never Not New, Always Striving)
- Established: c. 1604; 422 years ago
- Department for Education URN: 124487 Tables
- Chair of Governors: David Wallbank
- Headmaster: Michael Getty
- Staff: 85
- Gender: Mixed
- Age: 2 to 18
- Enrolment: 889 (from 2024 ISI inspection)
- Houses: Barratt, Dutton, Kitchener and Myott
- Colours: Red and black
- Former pupils: Castilians
- Affiliation: Headmasters' and Headmistresses' Conference
- Website: https://www.nuls.org.uk

Newcastle-under-Lyme School is a co-educational private day school in the town of Newcastle-under-Lyme in Staffordshire, England. It came about by a merger in 1981 of the old Newcastle High School (founded in 1874) with the Orme Girls' School (founded in 1876). Earlier predecessor boy's and girls schools date back over 400 years.

== Present day ==
The school nowadays consists of nursery and preparatory departments, a senior school and a sixth form. It takes boys and girls from the ages of 3–18. The current Headmaster is Michael Getty.

The school belongs to the Headmasters' and Headmistresses' Conference (HMC). It is one of the top 100 performing schools in England in terms of its A-level results, and managed record GCSE pass levels in 2020.

== Controversy ==
The school recently constructed a new sports hall and was refused planning permission, this refusal came after objection from the council and nearby homeowners. However the school won the appeal and the council was ordered to pay for the cost of the appeal.

The cost of the facilities was provided by Denise Coates who owns Bet365, as some of her children attended the school. Objections from pupils surrounding the school taking funding from a betting company were ignored by the school and governors. This led to protest and outrage from the media and students.

== Notable former pupils ==
In birth order:

- William Watkiss Lloyd (1813–1893), writer and scholar
- Alfred Webb-Johnson, 1st Baron Webb-Johnson (1880-1958), distinguished surgeon
- T. E. Hulme (1883–1917), writer
- George Wade (1891–1986), pottery manufacturer
- Camilla Wedgwood (1901–1955), anthropologist
- Frank Barlow (1911–2009), historian
- Kenneth H. Roscoe (1914–1970), soil engineer
- John Wain (1925–1994), writer, poet and academic
- Peter G. "Spam" Hammersley CB OBE (1928–2020), Rear Admiral, Royal Navy
- Clifford Boulton (1930–2015), parliamentary official
- Rosemary O'Day, née Brookes, (born 1945), historian and author
- David Taylor (1947–2001), humourist, editor of Punch magazine.
- Alan Sinclair (born 1952), diabetologist and clinical scientist
- Robert Sinclair MacKay (born 1956), mathematician
- David J. C. MacKay (1967–2016), academic engineer
- Andy Whittaker (born 1967), media entrepreneur
- Roger Johnson (born 1970), TV newsreader
- Sarah Willingham (born 1973), media entrepreneur
- Dominic Burgess (born 1982), TV and film actor
- Dan Robson (born 1992), rugby player for Wasps RFC and England
- Geraint Vincent (living), TV journalist
- Tom Wagg (born 1997), Astrophysicist

== Gallery ==
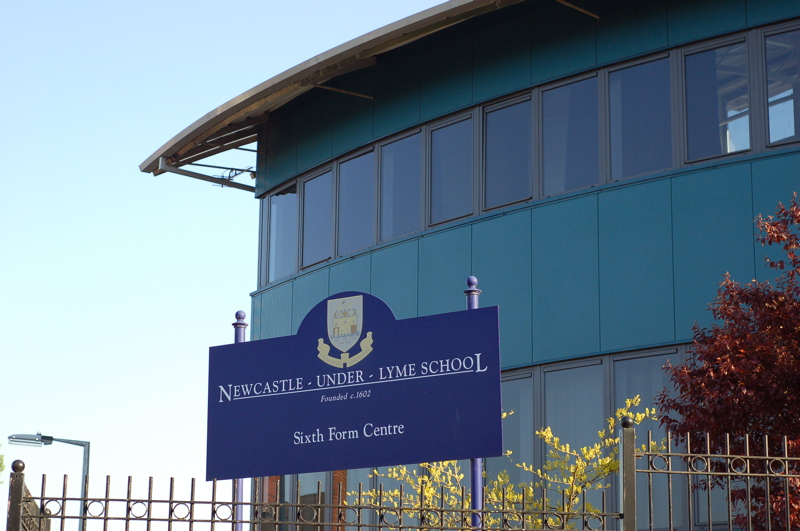
Sixth Form Centre

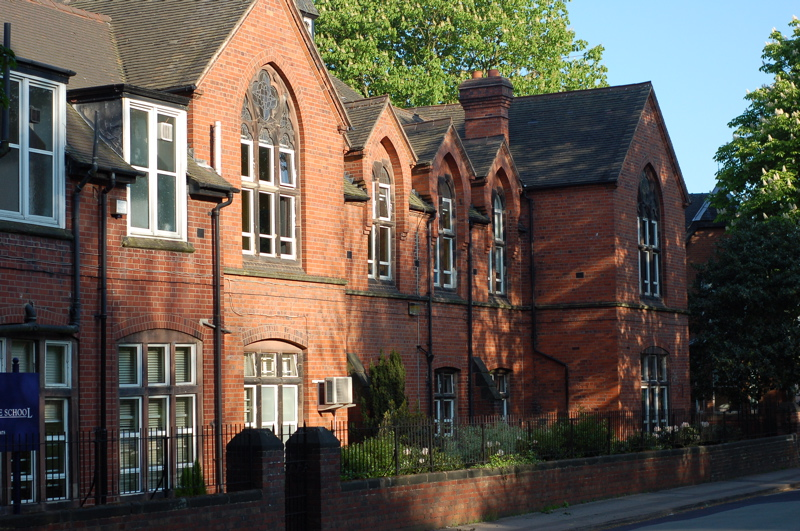
Victoria Building
