= Wilson Masilingi =

Tanzanian politician and diplomat

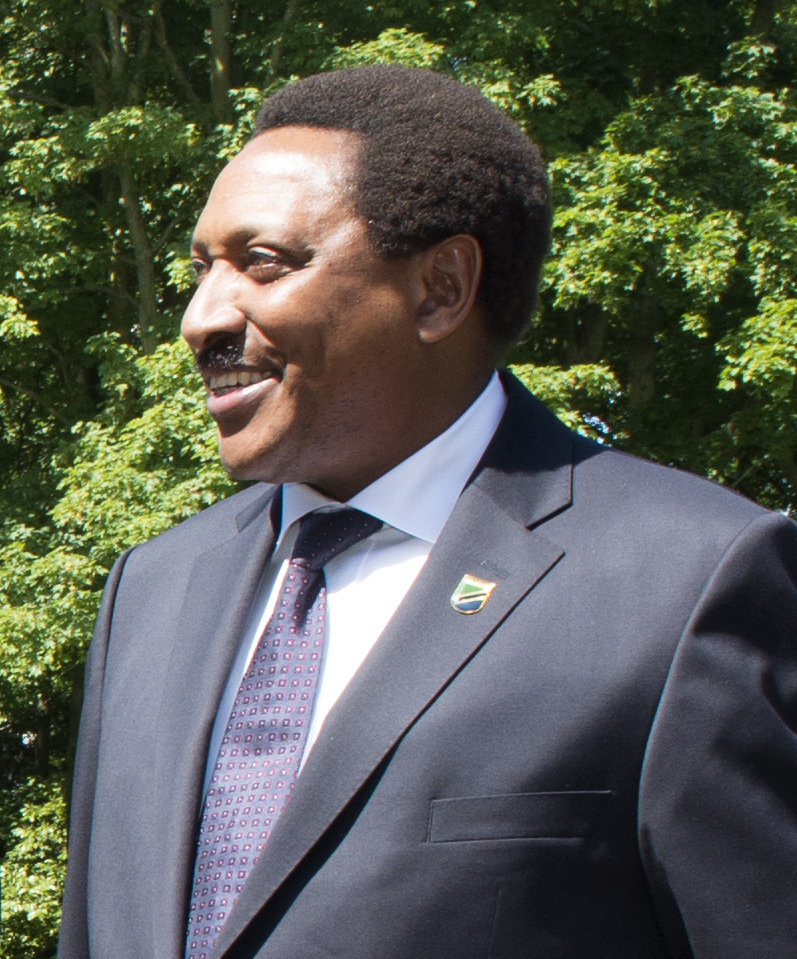

16th Tanzanian Ambassador to the U.S.
- In office 2015–2021
- Appointed by: Jakaya Kikwete; John Magufuli
- Preceded by: Liberata Mulamula
- Succeeded by: Elsie S. Kanza

Tanzanian Ambassador to Netherlands
- In office May 2013 – 2015
- Succeeded by: Irene Kasyanju

Member of Parliament for Muleba South
- In office 2000–2010
- Succeeded by: Anna Tibaijuka

Personal details
- Born: 12 July 1956 (age 70) Tanganyika
- Party: CCM
- Education: University of Dar es Salaam; George Washington Univ.

Wilson Mutagaywa Kajumula Masiling (12 July 1956) is a Tanzanian politician and diplomat. He is Tanzania's Ambassador to the United States after having served as Ambassador to the Kingdom of the Netherlands from March 2013.

The Ambassador graduated from the University of Dar es Salaam Law School in 1983 and The George Washington University Law School where he obtained his Bachelor of Laws and Master of Laws Degrees in 1995.

== Gallery ==
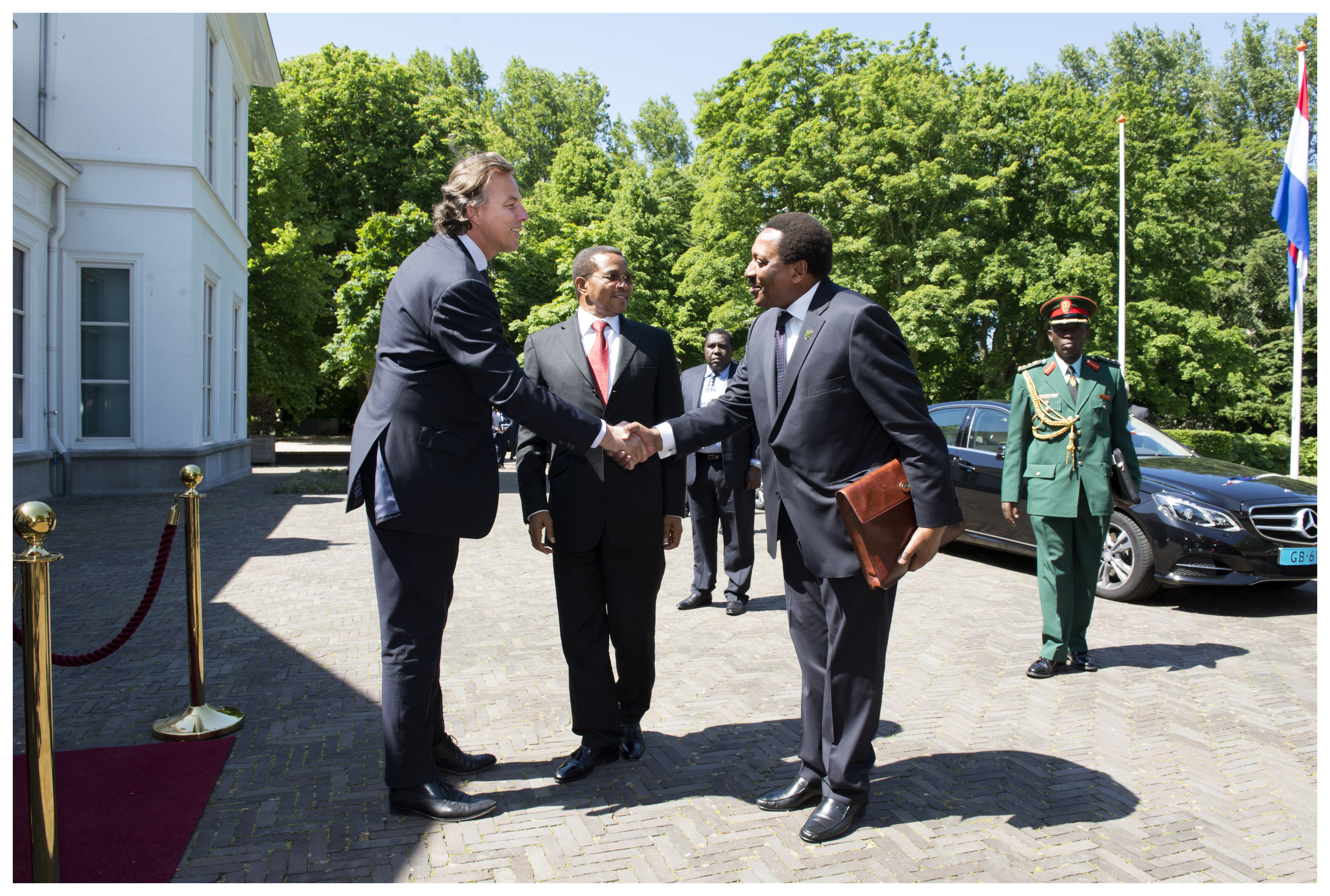
Greeting Dutch Foreign Minister Bert Koenders
