= Mark Hatfield (Georgia politician) =

American politician

Member of the Georgia House of Representatives from the 177th district
- In office 2005–2013
- Succeeded by: Dexter Sharper

Personal details
- Born: Waycross, Georgia
- Party: Republican

Mark Hatfield (born July 29, 1969, in Waycross, Georgia) was a Republican member of the Georgia House of Representatives, having been in office since 2005. He represented Georgia's 177th District. He graduated from the University of Georgia and is an attorney in Waycross.

On March 30, 2010, he filed a resolution, HR 1886, to bring articles of impeachment against the Attorney General of Georgia, Thurbert Baker because Baker (who was a Democratic candidate for Governor of Georgia) did not join the lawsuit against the health care reform measures signed by President Obama. HR 1886 had 30 co-sponsors, all Republicans.

== Views on Barack Obama's status as a natural born citizen ==
During an appearance on the Ed Schultz Show in 2010, Hatfield claimed that he does not possess enough information to decide whether or not Barack Obama was born in the United States, calling on President Obama to release his birth certificate. President Obama had previously released his official birth certificate issued by the state of Hawaii and made it available on the internet in June 2008. Obama later released his certified "long form" birth certificate in April 2011.

In January 2012, Hatfield represented two men in Georgia who had filed challenges to President Obama's appearance on Georgia's March 2012 primary ballot, on the grounds that Obama is not a natural born citizen of the United States. A hearing conducted by an administrative law judge at the request of the Georgia Secretary of State determined that Obama was a natural born citizen. The Secretary of State agreed, and directed that Obama's name remain on the ballot. Hatfield's appeal of the determination was dismissed in Georgia Superior Court.
