= David Taylor (editor) =

British magazine editor

David John Taylor (17 March 1947 – 13 November 2001) was a British humourist, writer and editor, noted for his association with the satirical news magazine Punch.

== Biography ==
David Taylor was born in Stoke-on-Trent, Staffordshire, the son of John Whitfield Taylor, a headmaster, cartoonist and frequent contributor to Punch, and his wife Alice (née Oldacre). Taylor was educated at Newcastle-under-Lyme High School and Magdalene College, Cambridge, where he read the English tripos. While at Cambridge, he was editor of the student newspaper Varsity, in which role he persuaded the young Prince Charles, then a second-year undergraduate at Trinity College, to record in print his impressions of student life – a coup that, in the words of Jonathan Sale, "made a few quid for Varsity's bank account."

After coming down from Cambridge with upper-second class honours in 1969, Taylor spent a short period working for the BBC before being appointed as an assistant editor at Punch, then under the auspices of William Davis and Alan Coren (from whom Taylor had once managed to secure an interview for Varsity). In 1978 he replaced Coren as deputy editor, after the latter took over from Davis as editor. During this time, Taylor became known for his irreverent motoring column and parodic interviews with celebrities, where he often mimicked the style of the interviewee in his prose.

According to The Times, Coren had promised Taylor the editorship upon his own retirement, but when that came to pass in 1987 the owners of Punch, United Newspapers, instead spent a considerable amount of time offering the role to "several more famous but unlikely candidates including, it was said, Kingsley Amis and Jeffrey Archer." Only in the following year, after much internal wrangling, did Taylor secure the position. Aware of its long, gradual decline in readership, he tried to attract younger contributors to the magazine and sponsored a new prize for the "funniest crime book of the year"; however, after just nine months he resigned "in mutual agreement" with United Newspapers, only shortly after he had received an award for producing Europe's best satirical publication. In presiding over such a chain of events, Sheridan Morley later opined, the management at United Newspapers "killed the magazine by throwing out baby and the bathwater." (Note: Punch was to close – albeit temporarily – in 1992.)

Taylor was succeeded as editor of Punch by Diana Thomas (then known as David Thomas). Thereafter, he spent five years as editor of British Airways' in-flight magazine, Business Life. He also edited specialist publications devoted to Nikon cameras and the ownership of Rolls-Royce vehicles. Latterly, he was a motoring correspondent for the Daily Telegraph.

== Personal life ==
Taylor was noted for being a technophile, with a passion for computers, cars and cameras. He also listed bell-ringing and golf among his recreations in Who's Who.

He died of a brain tumour in 2001, aged 54, and was survived by his wife Ann and two of their four children.

== Publications ==
- [as editor] The Pick of Punch (London: Grafton Books, 1988). ISBN 9780246134127
