= Luiz Antonio Gasparetto =

Brazilian psychologist, writer, and spiritualist

- Gasparetto in 1992
- Born: Luiz Antonio Alencastro Gasparetto; August 16, 1949; São Paulo, Brazil
- Died: May 3, 2018 (aged 68); São Paulo, Brazil
- Occupations: Psychologist, psychopictographic medium, writer, and television presenter
- Mother: Zíbia Gasparetto
- Website: gasparettoplay.com.br

Luiz Antonio Alencastro Gasparetto (August 16, 1949 – May 3, 2018) was a Brazilian psychologist, writer, television presenter, and psychopictographic medium. He gained notoriety in the late 1970s and throughout the 1980s for public performances, especially in Europe, in which he produced paintings attributed to renowned artists such as Renoir, Da Vinci, and Picasso through his claimed mediumistic ability. His television career began in 1987 with the program Terceira Visão on Rede Bandeirantes, and he later hosted Encontro Marcado on RedeTV!, which focused on family and social issues.

From the 1980s onward, Gasparetto distanced himself from Spiritism and dedicated himself to projects in the fields of psychology, self-help, and spirituality, publishing books and offering courses focused on personal development. In recent decades, he maintained activities associated with the New Age movement, including the production of metaphysical literature and the creation of projects such as "self-help theater". He expanded his presence through digital platforms, including a website, social media, and a YouTube channel. He died of lung cancer on May 3, 2018.

== Biography ==
Luiz Antonio Alencastro Gasparetto was born on August 16, 1949, in the Ipiranga neighborhood of São Paulo, into an Italian-descended family connected to Kardecist Spiritism. Biographical accounts indicate that his purported mediumistic abilities were recognized during childhood. At the age of thirteen, according to these narratives, he reportedly produced a painting attributed to the influence of the spirit of Claude Monet. He was taken to Chico Xavier, who provided guidance and suggested names of alleged artist spirits said to work through him. In the 1970s, accompanied by Elsie Dubugras, he performed in Europe, producing works signed with the names of renowned painters such as Renoir, Da Vinci, Rembrandt, and Picasso, which earned him international recognition.

"People think that when you die, you transform, but that is not true; we remain the same: we only evolve based on the experiences we have… However, in the dimension where they [the deceased painters] are, they appear differently in physical form. Toulouse-Lautrec, for example, when he approaches me, has no problem with his legs. He seems to me a very cheerful and humorous person."

— Luiz Antonio Gasparetto

Graduating in Psychology, Gasparetto attended courses at the Esalen Institute in the United States, a leading center for alternative therapies. From the 1980s onward, he began a progressive distancing from traditional Spiritism. In the 1990s, he founded the Espaço Vida e Consciência (later renamed Espaço da Espiritualidade Independente), dedicated to courses, lectures, and workshops integrating spirituality, psychology, and personal development themes, positioning himself within the so-called neo-esoteric circuit. Simultaneously, the family's Spiritist center was restructured, adopting the name Centro de Desenvolvimento Espiritual Os Caminheiros and incorporating practices such as passe com luzes (a healing practice combining Spiritist passe with chromotherapy) and "visualization sessions", until its closure in 1995, marking the definitive break with the philanthropic Spiritist model.

Gasparetto worked across various media outlets. On television, he hosted the program Terceira Visão (Rede Bandeirantes, 1980s) and Encontro Marcado (RedeTV!, 2005–2008), focused on advice regarding family and emotional issues. He also maintained a column in Revista Ana Maria and the radio program Gasparetto Conversando com Você on Rádio Mundial (1989–2014). His style was characterized by charismatic and interactive communication, using humor, improvisation, and imaginary dialogues addressing everyday stereotypes, often approaching performative and entertainment formats.

In the early 2000s, he founded the Companhia das Luzes, an amateur group that produced theatrical performances blending theater, dance, and music, with scripts written by him. In his spiritual work, he introduced the figure of the entity Calunga, presented as an Exu (a spirit from Umbanda), representing an approach to elements of Umbanda, distinct from Kardecist Spiritism. From 2007, he developed the project "Filhos da Luz" ("Children of Light"), which brought together a variety of "spiritual guides"—including historical, religious, and entrepreneurial figures—without attachment to a specific doctrine. These initiatives reflected his tendency to synthesize references from different symbolic and religious systems.

Starting in 2012, Gasparetto expanded his presence into the digital environment, launching a personal website, an app with daily video messages, a YouTube channel, and an official Facebook page. He was also one of the founders of the NGO Pró-Cães. In February 2018, he disclosed that he had been diagnosed with lung cancer. He died on May 3, 2018, in São Paulo, and was cremated at the Memorial Parque Paulista in Embu das Artes.

In 2019, the website Gasparetto Play was created, where videos of his courses and lectures, as well as those of various other teachers, are made available.
