= Elsie Gledstanes =

British artist

- Born: 1891; Ealing, London
- Died: 1982 (aged 90–91)
- Education: Slade School of Fine Art; Byam Shaw School of Art; Vicat Cole School
- Known for: Painting

Elsie Gledstanes (1891–1982) was a British artist notable as a painter of portraits, figure groups and landscapes.

== Biography ==
Gledstanes was born in Ealing, which was then in Middlesex and is now part of London. She studied art in Paris and on returning to London at the Slade School of Fine Art, at the Byam Shaw School of Art and the Vicat Cole School. In due course, Gledstanes established studios in both London and at Prenteg near Porthmadog in Wales and painted portraits, figure groups and landscapes in oils, pastel, tempera and watercolour.

In World War I Gledstanes served in the Women's Royal Naval Service and during World War II, worked as an auxiliary ambulance driver and as a driver for the Women's Legion. In both conflicts she painted and sketched individual and group portraits of other women active on war duties and several of these pictures are held by the Imperial War Museum and the Royal Air Force Museum in London. Her work, particularly her watercolours, were regularly shown at the Royal Academy in London, with both the Royal Society of British Artists and the Society of Women Artists as well as at Walker's Gallery and at the Ridley Art Club.
