= Elsie Gabriel =

Indian environmentalist and underwater diver

Elsie Gabriel is an Indian environmentalist and underwater diver.

Gabriel's parents were West Bengal professors. She is the founder of the Young Environmentalists Programme Trust, national coordinator of the Oceans Climate Reality Project, and the co chairperson of the Oceans School in Lakshadweep Islands.

in 2021, she was named the Ocean Quest Global Amb assador for India, and in 2023 she was inducted into the Women Divers Hall of Fame.

Her book, Get Out Get Going Outdoors, was published in 2014. As of 2023, she is based in Mumbai.
