= Elsie S. Kanza =

Tanzanian economist and diplomat

Elsie Sia Kanza
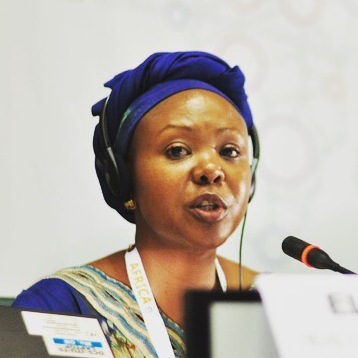

17th Tanzanian Ambassador to the U.S.
- Incumbent
- Assumed office 2021
- Appointed by: Samia Suluhu Hassan
- Preceded by: Wilson Masilingi

Personal details
- Born: Kenya
- Education: U. S. International University (Bachelor of international business administration); Williams College, U.S.A (Master of Arts in Development Economics)
- Occupation: Economist, businesswoman

Elsie Sia Kanza is a Tanzanian economist and current Ambassador of Tanzania to United States of America.

She has served in various positions in the Ministry of Finance and Central Bank of Tanzania, including becoming a personal assistant to His Excellency Jakaya Mrisho Kikwete of the United Republic of Tanzania and also his economic advisor. She joined the World Economic Forum in 2011 and has been engaged in changing the narrative of the African economy. Elsie was named as one of Pan-Africa's continent leading women 2020 by Forbes.

== Early life and education ==
Elsie S. Kanza was born and raised in Kenya by Tanzanian parents. She started her education in Kenya before proceeding to the United States of America and graduated with a bachelor's degree from the United States International University - Africa in Business Administration and later on graduated with a master's degree in Finance from the University of Strathclyde, United Kingdom and an MA in Development Economics from the Center for Development Economics, Williams College, USA.

== Career ==
Between 2002 and 2006, Elsie served in various positions in the Ministry of Finance and Central Bank of Tanzania and proceeded to become the personal assistant and economic advisor to His Excellency Jakaya Mrisho Kikwete of the United Republic of Tanzania till 2011 when she joined the World Economic Forum and has since been working to change the narrative of Africa. In 2014, Elsie became the World Economic Forum's Head of Africa and a member of the Executive Committee.

== Awards ==
Elsie Kanza has been recognised by different bodies for her contribution to the economic sector; this recognition includes:

- Archbishop Desmond Tutu Leadership Fellow, 2008
- Young Global Leader, World Economic Forum, 2011
- Nominee, Rising Talents Program, Women's Forum for the Economy and Society, 2011
- 20 Youngest Powerful Women in Africa, Forbes Africa, 2011
- 50 Influential Africans in The World, Pan-African magazine, Jeune Afrique, 2014
- Africa's 50 Most Powerful Women, Forbes Africa, 2020
