= Tom Wagg =

English astrophysicist

- Born: November 30, 1997 (age 28); Stoke-on-Trent, England
- Education: Harvard University (AB) University of Washington (MS, PhD)
- Occupations: PhD Graduate, May 2025 University of Washington
- Website: https://www.tomwagg.com/

Thomas James Wagg (born 30 November 1997) is an English astrophysicist, with interests in massive stars and gravitational waves. He has a PhD in Astronomy from the University of Washington. He holds the Guinness World Record for being the youngest person to have discovered a exoplanet.

== Early life and education ==
Wagg was born in Stoke-on-Trent, a green country-side city located in Staffordshire, England. He attended Newcastle-under-Lyme school, where he attained an A* in all 12 GCSE exams, including astronomy. While in high school, he completed a work experience program at Keele University on an exoplanet search project under Professor Coel Hellier.

He graduated from Harvard College in 2020 with a bachelor’s degree in Physics and Astrophysics and a secondary in Computer Science with the distinction cum laude. While there, his research program spanned luminous red galaxies with Daniel Eisenstein and population genetics with Michael Desai, ultimately culminating in a senior thesis under Selma de Mink on the LISA mission’s ability to detect black hole–neutron star binaries. As an undergraduate, he also served the Harvard Library Judaica Division, pioneering the Alma Booster Chrome Extension used by the department to streamline record-keeping.

== Exoplanet discovery ==
In 2015, Tom discovered a planet during a work experience program for the astrophysics department of Keele University. His work contributed to the Wide Angle Search for Planets (WASP), an international consortium of academic institutions that use transit photometry to detect exoplanets. On the third day of his internship, Tom noticed a small irregular dip in the light intensity of a star, a common sign that an orbiting planet is passing between a star and the observation point. In 2016, researchers from the University of Liege and University of Geneva confirmed that fade was caused by a previously unknown exoplanet. Having made the discovery at 15 years old, Tom is thought to be the youngest person to discover a planet.

The planet, located over 2,000 light years away from Earth, was cataloged as WASP-142b, the 142nd planet discovered in the WASP survey. Researchers described the planet as a typical hot Jupiter, similar in size and structure to the largest planet in the Solar System but exhibiting a two-day orbit.

== Early career ==
Wagg completed a PhD in Astrophysics at the University of Washington in May 2025. His interests lie in massive, binary stars and gravitational waves. His notable works include investigating massive double compact objects that are detectable by LISA and producing an open-source Python package called LEGWORK for performing similar studies.

== Awards ==
- In 2020, he was awarded the Leo Goldberg Prize in Astronomy recognizing excellence in a senior thesis.
- In 2023, he was selected as a Kavli Summer Fellow.
- In 2025, he received the Distinguished Dissertation Award from the University of Washington for his PhD thesis “A Galaxy of Binaries: The impact of binary stellar interactions on gravitational-wave sources, asteroseismic pulsations and stellar kinematics”
