= Elsie Stevens =

British artist

Elsie E. Stevens (born 1907) was a British artist, known for her landscape paintings in both oil and watercolours.

== Biography ==
Stevens was born in Brighton on the south coast of England. Beginning in 1961, she studied painting privately in London with the Polish émigré artist Marian Bohusz-Szyszko in London and then the two worked together for some 15 years. Stevens had solo exhibitions at several commercial galleries including the Alwin Gallery, the Woodstock Gallery and both the Loggia and Barrett Galleries. She also had exhibitions in Amsterdam, Dublin, Durham, Eastbourne and at the Gardner Arts Centre at the University of Sussex in Brighton during 1973. Stevens was a member of the Free Painters and Sculptors group and for many years lived at Barcombe near Lewes before eventually moving to a nursing home at Wivelsfield Green.
