= Elsie Dubugras =

Brazilian journalist

- Born: 2 March 1904; São Paulo, Brazil
- Died: 2 March 2006 (aged 102); São Paulo, Brazil
- Occupation: Journalist
- Known for: Writings on the paranormal

Elsie Dubugras (1904 – 2006) was a Brazilian journalist, medium, parapsychologist and plastic artist. For 33 years she was the special editor and a translator at the popular magazine, Revista Planeta, and spent her 100th birthday at her office.

== Early life ==
Her Danish father had been living in South Africa but left there to catalogue insects in Brazil, where he met and married a Scottish woman. Elsie Dubugras was born in São Paulo on 2 March 1904. At the age of one her family moved to London. She had two older brothers. In London, she studied journalism and secretarial skills, returning to São Paulo with her mother at the age of 20 after her father died. She married at the age of 22 and had two sons. From early adolescence she had lived with visions that she could not explain, perceiving people who appeared and disappeared. Curious, she started to study the phenomenon with the Spiritist Federation of the State of São Paulo.

== Career ==
Fluent in Portuguese, English and French, Dubugras initially worked as an executive secretary. Later she would work as a debt collector for the airline, Pan Am, which took her around the world. She started working at Revista Planeta in 1972, when the magazine opened. She focused on topics such as the paranormal, ecology, religion and ufology. According to the then editor, Ignácio de Loyola Brandão, "Some months she wrote almost the entire magazine". On television, she was a researcher for the Terceira Visão programme, broadcast by Rede Bandeirantes.

As a journalist, Dubugras often accompanied Spiritist mediums, including Chico Xavier, on their travels. However, it was her work on psycho-pictography in association with Luiz Antonio Gasparetto in the late 1970s and 1980s that gave her national and international attention. She accompanied him on a two-month trip across Europe, during which his work caught the attention of the BBC in London, which produced a programme on Gasparetto that was watched by nine million people on 22 March 1978.

== Painting ==
Unhappy with the speed with which old buildings were demolished to make way for skyscrapers, Dubugras spent more than three decades painting watercolours of the disappearing buildings. The collection of watercolours is reproduced in two books: São Paulo do Tempo da Garoa (São Paulo in the time of the drizzle) and Imagens do Litoral Paulista (Images from the São Paulo coast). Before these were published, she had already published O mundo do paranormal, Luiz Antonio Gasparetto and Renoir é voce (Renoir is you).

== Death ==
Having worked on her 100th birthday, Elsie Dubugras died on her 102nd birthday, on 2 March 2006, in São Paulo.
