= Elsie Baker =

American actress (1893–1971)

- Baker in Petticoat Junction in 1965
- Born: July 13, 1893; Chicago, Illinois, U.S.
- Died: August 16, 1971 (aged 78); Hollywood, California, U.S.
- Occupation: Actress
- Children: 2

Elsie Baker (July 13, 1893 – August 16, 1971) was an American actress. Her career spanned from vaudeville and silent movies to radio, Hollywood, and television. She has sometimes been confused with the American contralto Elsie West Baker (1886–1958) who was also known as Elsie Baker.

== Early life and career ==
Baker was born in Chicago, Illinois, into a theatrical family, with an actress for a mother and a father who owned a Chicago stock company. She first went on stage when she was just 10 months old, and more than 70 years later Baker was still taking roles in Hollywood films until just before her death.

== Personal life and death ==
On August 16, 1971, she died of a heart attack at her home in Hollywood. She was survived by a son and a daughter.

== Filmography ==
Year	Title	Role	Notes
1916	The Mysteries of Myra	The Vampire Woman	
1916	Beatrice Fairfax	Marie Boccetti / Circus Woman in Tent / The Other Woman	part 1, 2, 13
1917	Patria		Serial
1917	The Black Stork		
1950	Mystery Street	Elderly Lady	Uncredited
1950	Shakedown	Palmer's Maid	Uncredited
1951	You Never Can Tell	Minor Role	Uncredited
1952	No Room for the Groom		Uncredited
1952	Ma and Pa Kettle at the Fair		Uncredited
1953	Bad for Each Other	Mrs. Olzoneski	Uncredited
1954	Three Hours to Kill	Townswoman	Uncredited
1958	Alfred Hitchcock Presents	Church Attendee	Season 3 Episode 32: "Listen, Listen...!"
1964	Good Neighbor Sam	Mrs. Nurdlinger	Uncredited
1968	Blackbeard's Ghost	Old Lady #2	
1968	The Ghosts of Hanley House	Lucy	
