= Elsie Suréna =

Haitian writer

- Occupations: writer and visual artist

Elsie Suréna (born June 9, 1956) is a Haitian writer and visual artist.

== Biography ==
She was born in Port-au-Prince and grew up in southern Haiti. Suréna studied visual arts at the Ecole Nationale des Arts. She continued her studies in visual arts at the school of the Boca Raton Museum of Art and at the Armory Art Center in West Palm Beach, Florida. She also studied Creative Writing, Education at the Cambridge Center for Adult Education, and also at the Boston Center for Adult Education. She lived more than twenty years at Cap-Haïtien in the north before returning to the southern part of the island. Since 2010, she has been living in Canada.

Suréna expresses herself through poetry, including haiku, photography, collage. She writes in Haitian Creole, French, English and Spanish. Her writing has appeared in various anthologies and publications, including Le Matin and Le Nouvelliste. Her visual works have been included in group exhibitions in Haiti, the United States, Japan, the Dominican Republic and Canada.

== Awards and honors ==
In 1999, she won the Les Belles Provinciales competition sponsored by the French Ministry of Culture and Cooperation. In 2009, she received the Prix Belleville Galaxie at the 5th International Marco Polo Competition for Haïku. In both 2009 and 2014, she received an Honorable Mention at the Mainichi Daily News International Haiku contest (Osaka, Japan). Judge's Award for "Stone Steps", Exhibit Photography, Delray Beach, FL, USA, 2005.

In 2023, her poetry collection Amours jaunies suivi de Miscellanées was a finalist for the Prix Alain-Thomas for best book published by a francophone writer living in Ontario at the Salon du livre de Toronto.

== Selected work ==
- Mélodies pour Soirs de Fine Pluie, poetry (2002)
- Confidences des Nuits de la Treizième Lune, poetry (2003)
- Ann al jwe, youth literature (2007)
- Haïkus d’un soir, poetry (2009)
- Tardives et sauvages, poetry (2009)
- L’Arbre qui rêvait d’amour, youth literature (2009)
- Lanmou se flè sezon, poetry (2011)
- Retour à Camp-Perrin, short stories (2013)
- Le Temps d'un amour, poetry (2013)
- Dis aykou ak twa chante pou wou, poetry (2013)
- Tankou fèy bannann sèch, youth literature (2014)
- Reflets d'automne dans la Mattawishkwia, poetry (2017)
