= Elsie Smeaton Munro =

Scottish writer

- Born: Elizabeth Smeaton Munro; 1880; Glasgow
- Died: 20 December 1961 (aged 80–81); Glasgow
- Other name: Elsie S. M. Bilsland
- Occupations: Writer, singer
- Spouse: William Inglis Bilsland
- Father: John M. M. Munro

Elizabeth "Elsie" Smeaton Munro (1880 – 20 December 1961) was a Scottish writer, singer, and performer.

== Early life ==
Munro was born in Glasgow, the daughter of John M. M. Munro and Margaret Dunlop Smeaton. Her father was a noted electrical and civil engineer, as was her older brother, Donald Smeaton Munro. Her younger brother, Ion Smeaton Munro, was a diplomat, journalist, and book collector. Neil Munro was a relative.

== Career ==
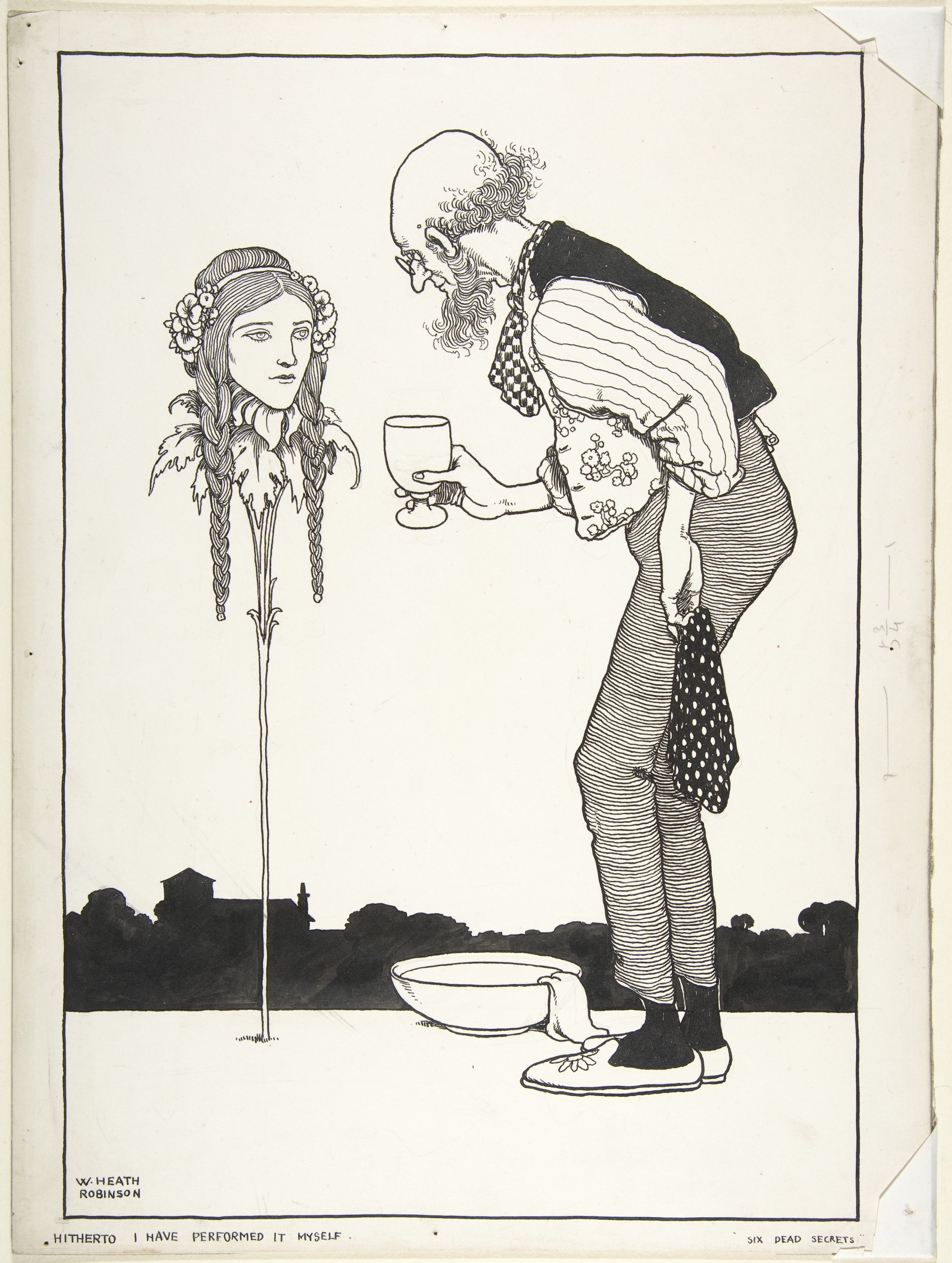
"Hitherto I Have Performed it Myself"; a W. Heath Robinson illustration for Munro's "Six Dead Secrets" in Topsy-Turvy Tales (1923), from the collection of the Metropolitan Museum of Art

Munro starred in a 1904 production of La fille de Madame Angot in Glasgow in 1904. She wrote a comic operetta, The Kink, performed in Glasgow in 1910, with music by George Henry Martin. Her short plays Rosemary and The Cottage of Content were performed in Glasgow in 1916, as a wartime benefit for the Limbless Sailors' and Soldiers' Hospital.

Munro wrote scripts for the Children's Hour programme on BBC Radio, and gave recitals and reports for broadcast. She also wrote two books, Glasgow Flourish (1911), and Topsy-Turvy Tales (1923), a collection of "utterly ridiculous" fairy tales called "refreshingly original" in The Publishers' Circular.

== Publications ==
- Glasgow Flourish: Short Sketches (1911)
- Topsy-Turvy Tales (1923, illustrated by W. Heath Robinson)
- "Passing Sheep" (poem, in a 1971 anthology of Scottish verse)

== Personal life and legacy ==
Munro married engineer William Inglis Bilsland in 1913. Her husband died in 1953, and she died in 1961, at the age of 79. The Elsie Smeaton Munro Collection of Theatre Memorabilia is in the Scottish Theatre Archive at Glasgow University Library.
