= Elsie Dahlberg-Sundberg =

Swedish sculptor

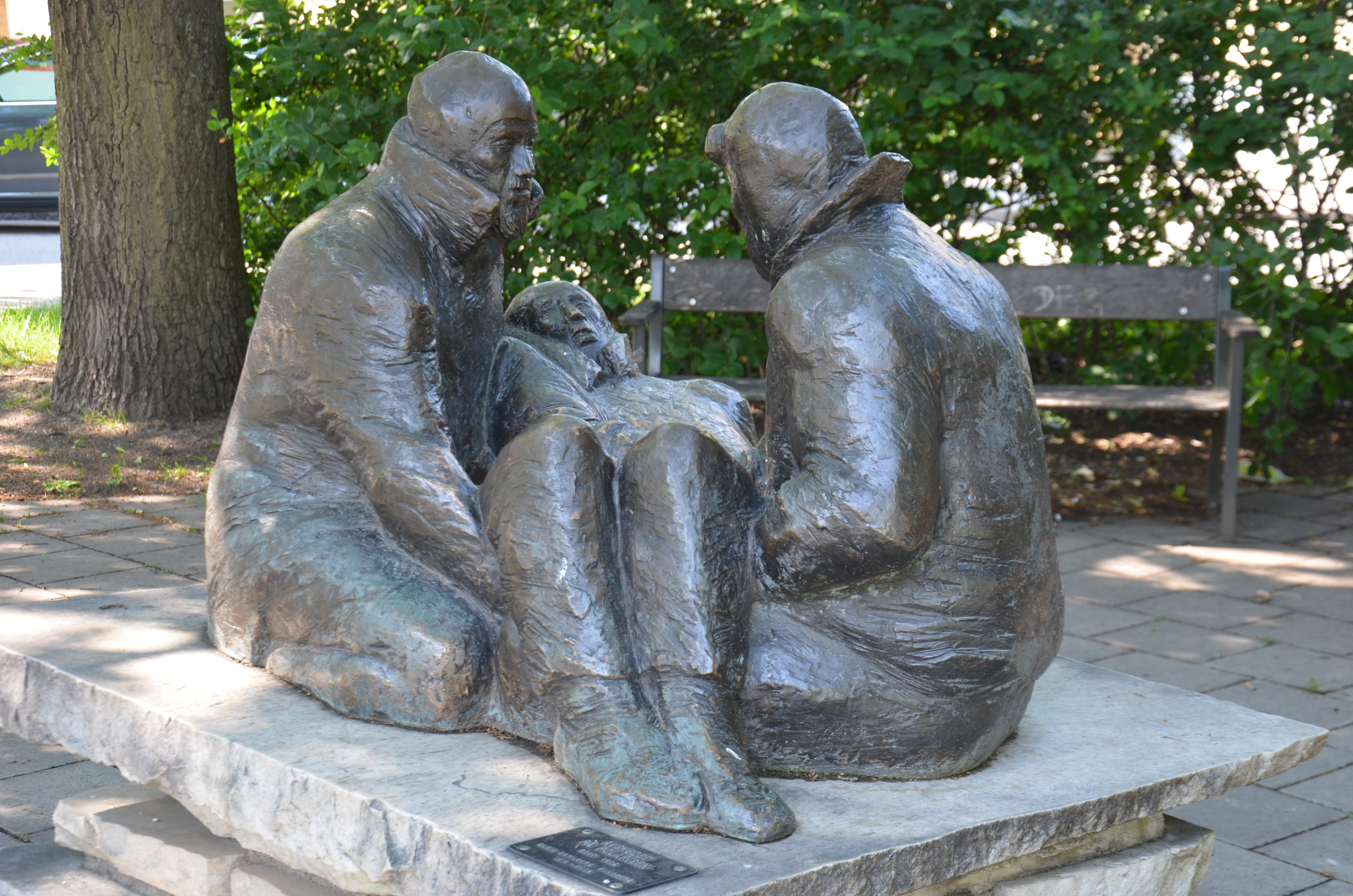
Elsie Dahlberg's Avskedet på polarisen (1980)

Elsie Margareta Dahlberg-Sundberg (1916–2005) was a Swedish sculptor and medalist. She began studying art in 1937 and continued her education in Denmark, France and Italy in the early 1950s. On completing several public commissions, she was elected into the Nya Idun society in 1958. In 1968, she created the bronze sculpture of two boys, Snacket, for the Malmberget town council. She went on to create other public works, smaller sculptural items and became something of a specialist in medals in the late 1970s. In the 1980s, she turned to wood carvings.

== Biography ==
Born in Stockholm on 8 December 1916, Elsie Margareta Dahlberg was the daughter of the wholesaler Lars Fredrik Dahlberg and his wife Anna Sofia Margareta née Eriksson. She was one of the family's nine children. Born with clubfoot, she underwent her first of several operations when she was four, eventually being able to walk and dance with special footwear.

Keen to become an artist as a child, in 1937 she began taking evening classes at the Tekniska Skolan, paying her way by working for Sweden's statistical office. On visiting the school's sculpture class one day, she suddenly discovered she loved to work with clay. She gave up painting and her office job and, thanks to a small scholarship from the school, turned to sculpture. After interrupting her studies to work in a printing office and a bank, in early 1940 she began caring for an elderly couple. The woman's sister turned out to be a sculptor who was able to continue her training.

After returning for a period to the Technical School, she began studying at the academy in 1941. That November, she married Per Sundberg, who had been training to be a pilot but missed his exam while caring for his sick mother. He eventually died as a manic depressive in 1993. Their daughter Helena (born 1943) also became a sculptor. In 1951, they moved to Lidingö. Thanks to her husband's job at Bromma Airport, Elsie was able to get free tickets to study in Copenhagen, Paris, Nice and Rome. Thanks to a scholarship, in 1952 she made a trip to work at the Villa San Michele in Capri.

Dahlberg-Sundberg worked with a variety of materials, including terracotta, mosaic, wood, stone, bronze and plaster. She created many public works such as Snacket in Malmberget. From 1940, she presented her works in many exhibitions such as the one she arranged in 1941 together with Wiwi Möller-Lindquist in Stockholm's Brinken Gallery.

In 1975, she was commissioned by the company AB Sporrong to create a series of medals under Sveriges och dess regenter under 1000 år, depicting Swedish monarchs. She went on to design medals depicting Swedish writers as Stora Svenska Författare (1978) and one in honour of the birth of Crown Princess Victoria on 14 July 1977. In 1980, she created a medal commemorating Adolf Erik Nordenskiöld's voyage through the North West Passage. Her later sculptures include Avskedet på polarisen (1979) and Pojke med säljpipa (1987).

Elsie Dahlberg died on 27 January 2005 and was buried in Solna's Norra begravningsplatsen.
