= Elsie Sunderland =

American scientist

Professor Elsie M. Sunderland
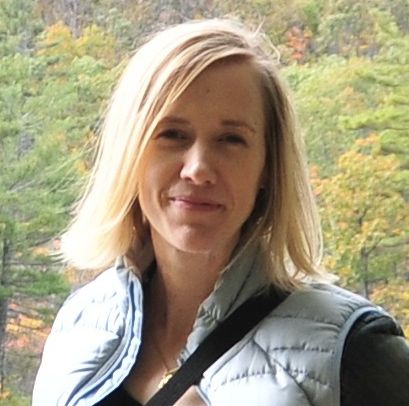
- Education: Ph.D. Simon Fraser University, B.Sc. McGill University
- Scientific career
- Fields: biogeochemistry of toxicants
- Workplaces: Harvard University
- Thesis: Development of a marine mercury cycling model for Passamaquoddy Bay, New Brunswick (2003)
- Website: https://bgc.seas.harvard.edu

Elsie M. Sunderland is a Canadian toxicologist, environmental scientist and the Gordon McKay Professor of Environmental Chemistry at Harvard University. She studies processes through which human activities increase and modify pollutants in natural ecosystems and living systems.

== Research ==
Sunderland's research attempts to trace how the introduction of synthetic chemical compounds into the natural environment affects the global environment and food supplies of animals and people. Sunderland refers to the accelerating use of anthropogenic chemicals as civilization's "global chemical experiment" that is affecting all continents and life on Earth. Her research seeks to track and quantify where these compounds go in the environment, and how they make their way into the tissues of wildlife and humans.

=== The Global Chemical Experiment ===
Sunderland and her research group at Harvard seek to model and quantify how human actions affect natural habitats and human food supplies, such as fish. The group develops mathematical models and conducts laboratory measurements of physical samples collected from ecosystems in order to develop mechanistic understanding that can inform policy and the public. These efforts seek to quantify and understand the "fate and transport" of natural and synthetic compounds.

Sunderland's research seeks to trace the impact of introducing novel exogenous compounds on natural ecosystems. These compounds are more and more prevalent in natural habitats, largely as a consequence of the fact that modern industry relies on a growing range of chemical compounds, including heavy metals such as lead (Pb), copper (Cu), zinc (Zn). Further, chemical companies such as Dow and DuPont have created almost 100,000 synthetic organic chemicals. While these chemicals have enabled the Green Revolution and smart materials, they also combine elements from across the periodic table into new materials that were not present throughout most of Earth's history during which natural organisms evolved. Modern science has limited understanding of how these new compounds behave once released into the environment. Many of these synthetic chemicals persist and do not break down in the natural environment.

As described in Sunderland's tenure talk at Harvard, the group has explored several classes of contaminants with different chemical properties, including Mercury, PFAS, and PCBs.

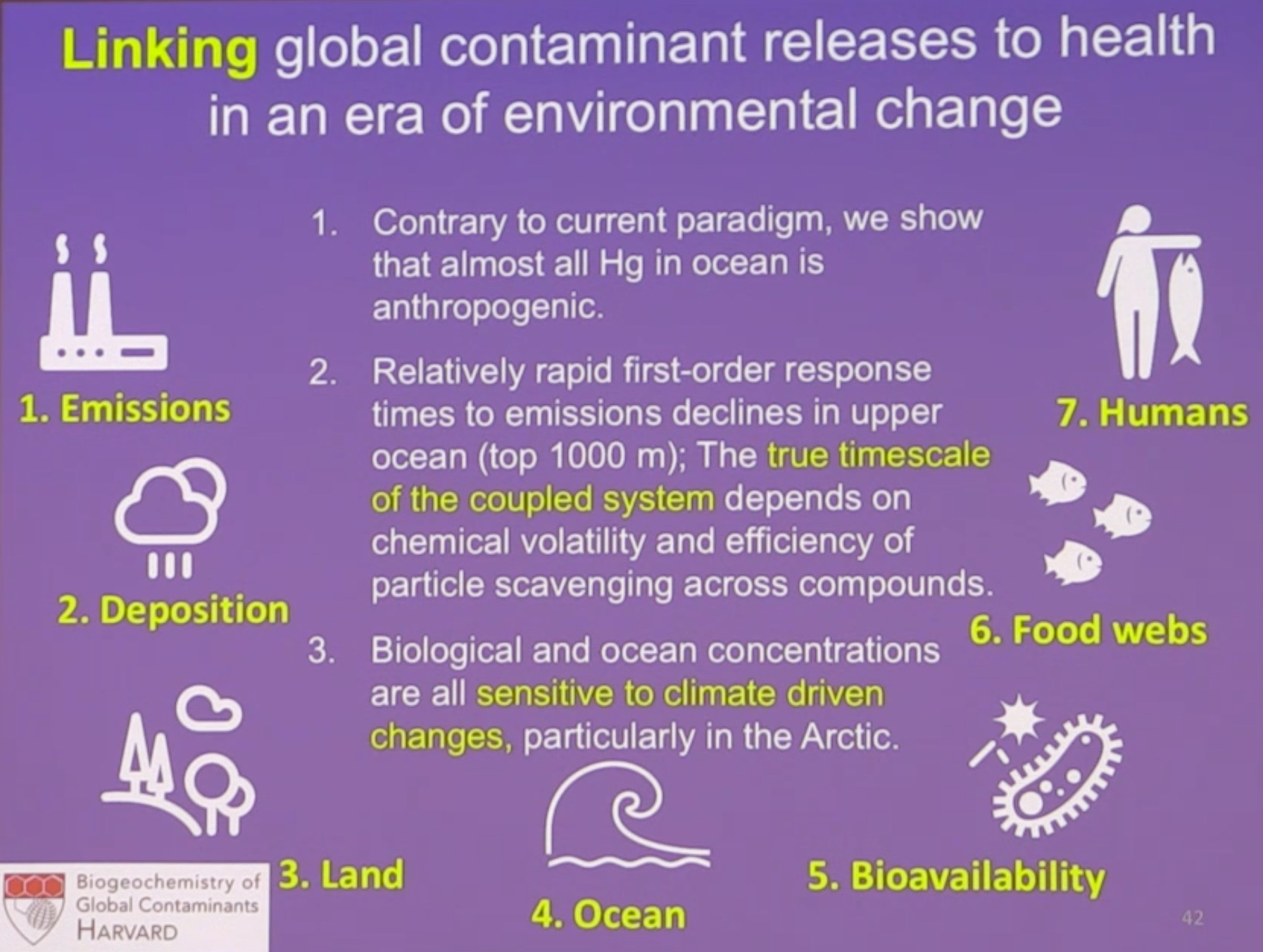
Summary graphic from seminar about the global chemical experiment by Sunderland.

=== Global Mercury Cycle ===
Sunderland's early work focused on methylmercury in Passamaquoddy Bay on the edge of the North Atlantic. Over time, this interest expanded to the global processes that transport mercury through the world's oceans, ecosystems, and human food supply. Mercury is a naturally occurring element that is toxic to nerve cells and can bioaccumulate when methylated. By organizing the central principles of the global mercury cycle, Sunderland's group has led development of models that quantify the impacts of human activities on the fate and transport of mercury.

These models have enabled deeper understanding of how climate change is affecting mercury levels in fish that people eat. While US environmental regulations caused coal fired power plants to reduce their emissions of mercury, the group's models have found that in some cases the effects of climate change on mercury levels have outpaced those reductions leading to more mercury in fish.

Related work has assessed how hydroelectric developments in NewFoundland increasing risk of methylmercury poisoning in indigenous peoples near the Arctic

Development of hydroelectric dams and as well as permafrost thaw from global warming could increase the impact of mercury on human populations in the arctic.

=== Fluorinated Compounds ===
Expanding beyond mercury, Sunderland's group has sought to understand how people are exposed to poly- and perfluoroalkyl substances (PFAS) and to develop quantitative tools tracing PFAS exposures back to their sources. This thread of research includes work on Cape Cod, where a team of researchers including Sunderland have been studying drinking water.

That work led to a widely read scientific paper titled "Detection of Poly- and Perfluoroalkyl Substances (PFASs) in U.S. Drinking Water Linked to Industrial Sites, Military Fire Training Areas, and Wastewater Treatment Plants" with several co-authors including Arlene Blum and Philippe Grandjean.

More recently, PFAS have appeared in bottled drinking water, and Sunderland has been interviewed as an expert on the matter.

=== Polychlorinated Biphenyls (PCBs) ===
The impact of PCBs on living organisms has been studied extensively, and the Sunderland group has extended this work by developing global models of how these long-lived persistent pollutants move through the world.

== Awards ==
In 2019, the Web of Science recognized Sunderland as a Highly Cited Researcher with multiple highly cited papers in top 1% of the field.

In 2012, the Star Family gave awards to Sunderland recognizing her excellent and promising scientific research.

Sunderland was recognized for her service as a peer reviewer by the journal Biogeochemistry and the Editorial Board of Estuaries and Coasts.

While working at the US EPA, the agency recognized Sunderland with the U.S. EPA Level II Scientific & Technological Achievement (STAA) Award (2010), U.S. EPA Level I (highest level) Scientific & Technological Achievement (STAA) Award (2008), and U.S. EPA National Honor Award, Gold Medal for Exceptional Service (2005).

SFU awarded the Dean's Convocation Medal for best graduate thesis to Sunderland.
