= Elsie Eleanor Verity =

Motor engineer and garage owner

- Born: 14 August 1894; Barton upon Irwell, England
- Died: 9 June 1971 (aged 76)
- Known for: Motor Engineering

Elsie Eleanor Verity (14 August 1894 – 9 June 1971) was known as "The First Lady of the motor trade".

== Biography ==
Elsie Eleanor Verity was also known as Miss E E Verity and was born in Barton upon Irwell, Lancashire, in 1894 to William and Lilly Verity. William Verity came from a metalworking family. He began as a whitesmith, then a fitter and began a building bikes which became a motor garage in Manchester.

== Education ==
Verity attended Manchester Central High School and at 16 she left school and began learning engineering from her father. He had already taught her to drive when she was 13. By the time she was 14, Verity was teaching driving. On her sixteenth birthday in 1910, she was sent by her father to drive a car back from London to Manchester (well over 200 miles), accompanied by a garage employee who had been instructed that she was to drive the entire way herself.

Verity went to the Manchester College of Technology and Manchester High School of Commerce where she took courses in automobile engineering.

== First World War ==
When the First World War began Verity began working as a driving instructor for the military, ultimately teaching hundreds of men to drive. She was also part of the Curios concert party, organising entertainment for troops in the evenings. She taught at Ministry of Pensions’ driving scheme for service men who had shell shock.

== Verity's Garage ==
After the war Verity worked in the motor garage and when her father died she took it over for good in 1925. The garage was Verity's University Garage and Motor School. She undertook much of the motor repair work herself, and developed and ran a Driving School under the Royal Automobile Club's scheme. She appointed her cousin Clifford Luke as her foreman and manager and her workforce of "my boys" were loyal and long term employees. 1950s adverts for Verity's offered repairs, new and used cars, driving lessons and motor insurance and promoted their agency for Renault cars at 1001-107 Lloyd Street North, near Victoria University.

Verity joined the Institute of the Motor Trade in 1927. She was an active member of the organisation, chair of the North West region branch and often as the only woman at events. In 1930 Verity was awarded the Institute of Motor Trades Wakefield Gold Medal, endowed by Castrol Oil founder Sir Charles Wakefield. She was given it for the best paper any motoring subject entitled What are the benefits of price maintenance?.

The outbreak of the Second World War caused her to get back into training drivers for the armed forces and emergency services. She taught mechanical and repair theory at a lecture theatre in her garage. Verity was also in the Civil Defense. She also spoke at the Manchester Gas Showrooms Warfare cookery demonstrations.

== Memberships ==
Verity became the first female Fellow of the Institute of the Motor Trade. She remained active even after closing the garage. She was also a member of the Manchester Soroptimists’ women's group where she was an active vice-chairwoman in 1931, captaining a cricket team playing against the Liverpool Soroptimists. She joined the Women's Engineering Society in 1939 and was chair of the Manchester branch before going on to be Vice-President of the Society in 1947–8. She turned down the Presidency as it coincided with the compulsory purchase of her garage property for the expansion of Manchester University, when she had to rebuild her business. Verity made regular donations in support of the organisation and was advertised her garage in The Woman Engineer journal for over 20 years. She was elected to membership of the Manchester Literary and Philosophical Society in 1952 while living on Brantingham Road, Whalley Range, Manchester.

== Personal life ==
Verity lived with her cousin Emily “Em" Verity MBE, physics teacher and head of science at Withington Girls’ School, and died on 9 June 1971. Their friend electrical engineer and photometry expert, Isabel Harwick wrote both women's obituaries.
