= Elsie Napier =

American politician

Member of the Georgia House of Representatives from the 177th district
- Member-elect
- Assumed office January 11, 2027
- Preceded by: Alvin Payton

Personal details
- Party: Democratic
- Website: Official website

Elsie Cason Napier is an American politician who is a member of the Georgia House of Representatives, representing the 177th district.

== Career ==
Napier is a pastor. She has had a career in public health. She was elected unopposed to the Georgia House of Representatives, in the general election on November 3, 2026. She was previously a candidate for the special election. She was elected in the June 2026 run-off election.
