= Elsie M. Lewis =

First black female historian

- Born: May 12, 1912; Little Rock, Arkansas
- Died: November 7, 1992 (aged 80); Cleveland Heights, Ohio
- Occupations: Historian; professor; consultant

Academic background
- Education: Fisk University (BA); University of Southern California; (MA); University of Chicago (PhD)

Academic work
- Discipline: History
- Institutions: Howard University

Elsie M. Lewis (May 12, 1912 – November 7, 1992) was a scholar, history professor, and consultant who was the first African American woman to publish an article in The Journal of Southern History and one of the first African American women to receive formal training in history. Lewis was additionally one of the first African Americans to join the Southern Historical Association.

== Background ==
Elsie M. Lewis was born in Little Rock, Arkansas on May 12, 1912. Her mother, Mary Frances Moore, was from Rose Dale, Mississippi, and her father, Napoleon Lewis, hailed from Monroe, Louisiana. Elsie Lewis was married to Joseph F. Makel, a Washington businessman.

Lewis was a member of several different historical associations, including the American Historical Association, the Organization of American Historians, American Association of University Women, and was one of the first African Americans to be involved with the Southern Historical Association.

Elsie M. Lewis attended the Nashville, Tennessee based Fisk University for her undergraduate education, followed by the University of Southern California where she earned her MA in History. She later received her Ph.D. from the University of Chicago in 1946, making her one of seven African American women to earn a doctorate in history within the 1940s.

Lewis' dissertation, From National to Disunion: A Study of the Secession Movement in Arkansas, 1850-1861 marked the beginning of her notable career in academia. A portion of her research focused on African Americans in the South for the Civil War and Reconstruction era.

In the late 1930s, while Lewis was a professor at Southern University in Baton Rouge, Louisiana, she encouraged the freedom dreams of students through the hosting of campus-wide mock elections for the Louisiana Governorship. She was also the creator of the quarterly campus bulletin, known as the Observer.

In 1955, Lewis' article, "The Political Mind of the Negro, 1865-1900," was published in The Journal of Southern History (JSH), making her the first African American woman to have an article published for JSH. The essay was also distinguished as the first article written by an African American about African American content. The piece covered the political views and thoughts of African Americans during this period and also the themes of emancipation.

Lewis also had her work published in Carter G. Woodson's Journal of Negro History. Lewis began her career as a history professor at Southern University in Baton Rouge, Louisiana, then at Tennessee Agricultural and Industrial State University, where she was the head of the graduate department of history.

In 1956, Lewis began working with the history department at Howard University. Eight years later she was selected as the chair of the history department. Dr. Lewis implemented substantial changes during her five-year term as the chair. She propelled changes in the department that granted graduate students more diverse course options.

Lewis contributed to a complete revision that allowed undergraduate students to concentrate on history. Lewis also taught at George Washington University and Hunter College of the City University of New York.

In 1968, the National Park Service Washington D.C. office extended an invitation to Lewis to review material on African American history for their new American Museum of Immigration exhibit plans. She accepted their offer to provide her historical expertise and became a member of the Historians Committee for the future museum, located at the base of the Statue of Liberty on Liberty Island, New York.

On March 7, 1965, Lewis participated in the historic march from Selma to Montgomery in Alabama that was led by Martin Luther King Jr. to fight for Black voting rights. She marched with a group of 40-50 other distinguished American historians as the march approached Montgomery. The group was organized by Dr. Walter Johnson, Preston and Sterling Morton professor of American history at the University of Chicago.

When Lewis was the chair of Howard University's history department in 1969, she was also hired to be the historical consultant for Pepsi's third record in their Black history marketing series. Lewis helped produce Adventures in Negro History, Vol. III The Afro-American's Quest for Education: A Black Odyssey.

In 1970, Elsie M. Lewis took a sabbatical from Howard University to write a book, Washington in the new era, 1870–1970. Dr. Elsie M. Lewis died in Cleveland Heights, Ohio, on November 7, 1992.
