= Elsie Wagg =

English philanthropist

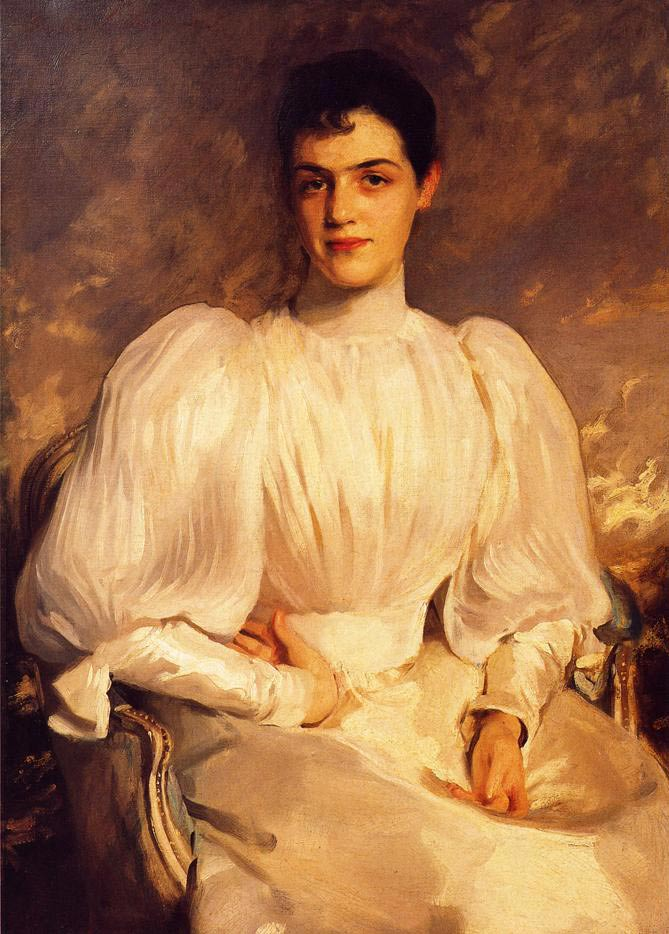
Portrait of Elsie Wagg by John Singer Sergeant

Elsie Margaret Wagg (29 January 1876 – 3 April 1949) was an English philanthropist and the originator of the open garden scheme that became known as the National Garden Scheme. A long-serving Council member of the Queen's Institute of District Nursing (now Queen's Institute of Community Nursing (QICN) ^{[2]}), she proposed that private gardens be opened to the public to raise funds for district nursing. The idea proved highly successful and became a national institution. In 1934 she was appointed MBE for initiating and organising the open garden scheme in aid of the QNI.

== Early life ==
Elsie Margaret Wagg was born in Marylebone, London, into a wealthy upper-middle-class family. Her father, Arthur Wagg, was a senior partner in Helbert, Wagg & Co., a City of London firm with close connections to leading financial houses. Her mother, Mathilde Moses, was born in Frankfurt. Though of Jewish descent, the Wagg children were brought up within Anglican society, and the family was highly assimilated into British cultural life.

The family lived at Bryanston Square, Marylebone and Adelaide Crescent, Hove, maintaining a substantial household. Elsie was educated at home, as was customary for girls of her class, and was presented at Court in 1894, marking her formal entry into society. She never married. In 1893, at the age of seventeen, her father commissioned a painting of her by the American artist John Singer Sargent. The portrait, Miss Elsie Wagg, was exhibited at the Royal Academy in 1926.

Following the deaths of her parents (1917 and 1919), Wagg inherited substantial wealth, including the family house in Hove. She moved to ‘The Hermitage’ near East Grinstead in 1923, where she lived for the remainder of her life.

== Philanthropic work ==
From a young adult, Wagg devoted herself to organised philanthropy, particularly in Brighton and Sussex. From 1903, Wagg served as Honorary Secretary of the Barclay Home for Blind Girls in Brighton and from 1909 as Honorary Secretary of both the Queen’s Nurses, Brighton and the Sussex Red Cross for Brighton, Hove and Preston.

Both the Queen’s Institute for District Nursing (QNI) and the Red Cross recognised Wagg’s skills and energy. By 1913, Wagg was welcomed on to the Council of the QNI and during the First World War she also served as Honorary Secretary of a Sussex Voluntary Aid Detachment of the British Red Cross.

She was appointed Member of the Order of the British Empire (MBE) in the 1934 New Year Honours ‘for services in initiating and organising the scheme for the opening of gardens in aid of the Queen’s Institute of District Nursing’.

== The National Garden Scheme ==
In October 1926, while serving on the Council of the Queen’s Institute, Wagg wrote a letter to the chairman of the National Memorial to Queen Alexandra proposing that owners of private gardens should open them to the public on payment of a shilling admission fee, with proceeds going to support district nursing. At the time, many large private gardens were inaccessible to the public, and the idea of organised national openings was innovative.

Her proposal was adopted and King George V agreed to open the Sandringham gardens, thereby encouraging others to open their garden. In 1927, the garden openings were organised by the Women’s National Committee of the National Memorial to Queen Alexandra, chaired by Lady Georgiana Mure and assisted by Millicent Stobart. The first gardens opened in May 1927, and the scheme was so successful it was extended to 30 September. Over six hundred gardens participated in its first year, with nearly two hundred thousand visitors raising £8,191 for district nursing.

As a result of this success, the open garden scheme was transferred to the Queen’s Institute becoming a permanent annual event, now known as the National Garden Scheme (NGS). Elsie Wagg served on the Gardens Committee of the Queen’s Institute for many years.

Wagg herself regularly opened the gardens of her home, ‘The Hermitage’ (demolished in 1972), in East Grinstead from 1929 until she died, when her younger brother Alfred continued to open the garden. She also served as County Organiser for East Sussex, helping to coordinate local participation. The scheme proved enduring and, over subsequent decades, raised many millions of pounds for nursing and other health-related charities.

At her death in 1949, the Queen’s Institute described her as “the originator of the National Garden Scheme,” noting the substantial funds already raised through her initiative. The scheme continues in the twenty-first century as a major charitable institution for England and Wales.

Wagg left an estate of £148,598.1s.4d. In 1963 the Elsie Wagg Fund became a charity for invalid and aged nurses.

She has featured in several books including Garden Heroes and Villains, Gardening Women: Their Stories From 1600 to the Present and The Joy of Gardening.
