= Elsie West Baker =

American singer (1886–1958)

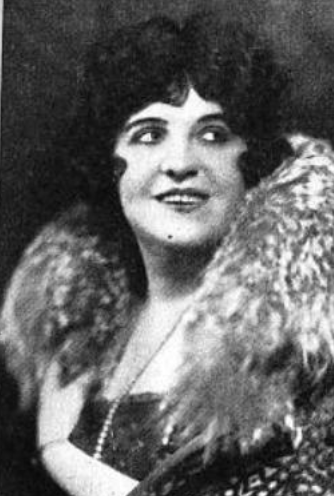
- Elsie West Baker, from a 1927 publication
- Born: September 27, 1886; Philadelphia, Pennsylvania, U.S.
- Died: April 28, 1958 (aged 71); New York, New York, U.S.
- Other names: Elsie Baker, Edna Brown, Nora Watson, Mabel West
- Occupation: Singer

Elsie West Baker (September 27, 1886 – April 28, 1958) was an American contralto singer who made hundreds of recordings in the 1910s and 1920s. She is sometimes confused with American actress Elsie Baker, who was about the same age.

== Early life and education ==
Baker was born in Philadelphia, the daughter of William Drinker Baker and Carrie Ella Green Hammond Baker. She studied voice with Oscar Saenger in New York.

== Career ==
Baker was a contralto singer. In 1910, she sang for a Washington, D.C. audience that included President WIlliam Howard Taft and his wife. She was a member of the Bethlehem Church Quartet of Philadelphia in 1911, and a soloist at St. Paul's Methodist Episcopal Church in New York City in 1920. She was heard regularly in concert and on radio in the 1920s. She also made hundreds of recordings for the Victor label, and wrote songs. She performed in the Virgin Islands in 1932.

Baker recorded under various names, including Edna Brown, Nora Watson, and Mabel West.

== Personal life ==
Baker was listed as divorced and living with her partner, Ellen F. Johnson, at the Ansonia Hotel, in the 1950 census. She died in 1958, at the age of 71, in New York City.
