= List of people from Newcastle-under-Lyme =

This is a list of notable people who were born in or have been residents of the town of Newcastle-under-Lyme, in the county of Staffordshire, England.

== Earlier centuries ==
- Humphrey Wollrich (1633–1707), Quaker writer.
- Philip Astley (1742–1814), equestrian, inventor and father of the modern circus
- Silvester Harding (1745–1809), artist and publisher, who joined a company of strolling actors at age 14
- John James Blunt (1794–1855), Anglican priest who wrote studies of the early Church.

== 19th century ==
- Henry Moseley (1801–1872), churchman, mathematician, and scientist.
- Joseph Mayer (1803–1886), goldsmith, antiquary and collector.
- Emma Darwin (née Wedgwood) (1808–1896), granddaughter of Josiah Wedgwood and wife of Charles Darwin
- Hungerford Crewe, 3rd Baron Crewe (1812–1894), landowner and peer, inherited the Jacobean Crewe Hall and failed to prevent the construction of a Silverdale and Madeley Railway Company line.
- Sir Oliver Lodge (1851–1940), physicist, inventor and writer
- Arthur Howard Heath (1856–1930), industrialist, cricketer, Rugby Union international and local Conservative MP
- Sir Joseph Cook (1860 in Silverdale – 1947), worked in the local coalmines before emigrating in 1885; Prime Minister of Australia, 1913–1914
- Grand Duke Michael Mikhailovich of Russia, (1861–1929), lived in Keele Hall in 1900–1909.
- Arnold Bennett (1867–1931), writer
- Ada Nield Chew (1870–1945), suffragist
- Alfred Herbert Richardson (1874–1951), policeman and Chief Constable of Newcastle-under-Lyme 1901-1903
- Oliver William Foster Lodge (1878–1955), poet and author born in Newcastle
- Fanny Deakin (1883–1968), local politician born in Silverdale, who campaigned for child nourishment and maternity care.
- Vera Brittain (1893–1970), author, reformer and pacifist, and mother of Shirley Williams
- Reginald Mitchell (1895–1937), designer of the Spitfire fighter plane

== 20th century ==
- E. S. Turner (1909–2006), journalist and author, went to school in the town.
- Fred Kite (1921–1993), only Second World War British soldier to receive the Military Medal three times
- Freddie Garrity (1936–2006), singer, lived in the town near the end of his life.
- Jackie Trent (1940–2015), singer, songwriter and actress
- Neil Baldwin (born 1946), clown, Stoke City kit-man and honorary graduate of Keele University
- Kevin John Dunn (1950–2008), twelfth Roman Catholic Bishop of Hexham and Newcastle
- Professor Alan Sinclair (born 1952), clinical scientist and diabetes specialist
- Dylan Waldron (born 1953), artist in traditional techniques such as painting in egg tempera and silverpoint
- Janet Bloomfield (1953–2007), peace and disarmament campaigner
- Fran Unsworth (born 1957), journalist, head of BBC News since January 2018
- Emma Amos (born 1964), actress
- Andrew Van Buren (living), illusionist showman, co-founder of the Philip Astley Project
- Hugh Dancy, (born 1975), actor
- Charlotte Salt, (born 1985), actress as Sam Nicholls in Casualty (TV series)
- Dan Croll, (born 1990) singer and songwriter
- Leon Cooke (born 1991), actor, singer and dancer
- Wes Nelson (born 1998), singer and reality television star
- Daniel Jones (born 1973), former professional ballet dancer with English National Ballet, choreographer, producer, documentary maker.
- Norman Berrisford (born 1928), architectural designer

== Notable sports people ==
- Dick Ray (1876–1952) professional footballer and manager with Port Vale and Manchester City
- Frederick Bailey (1919–1985), left-handed English cricketer
- Don Ratcliffe (1934–2014), footballer with Stoke City
- Mike Pejic (born 1950), footballer with Stoke City and Everton
- Ian Moores (1954–1998) footballer with Stoke City and Tottenham Hotspur
- Robbie Earle (born 1965), footballer with Port Vale and Wimbledon
- Graham Shaw (born 1967) footballer with Stoke City
- Dominic Cork, (born 1971) cricketer
- Simon Wakefield (born 1974), professional golfer
- Lizzie Neave (born 1987), slalom canoeist in women's kayak, competed in the 2012 Summer Olympics
- Oliver Sadler (born 1987), first-class cricketer
- Peter Wilshaw (born 1987), cricketer
- Eddie Hall (born 1988), professional strongman
- Danielle Wyatt (born 1991), professional England cricketer
- Curtis Nelson (born 1993), footballer for Plymouth Argyle F.C.
- Aaron Ramsdale (born 1998), footballer

== Notable politicians ==
- Sir John Merrick (1584–1659), politician and Newcastle-under-Lyme MP
- Robert Needham, 2nd Viscount Kilmorey (1587/88–1653), supporter of Charles I; MP for Newcastle-under-Lyme in the Addled Parliament in 1614.
- Sir Richard Leveson (1598–1661), MP for Newcastle in the Long Parliament
- Samuel Terrick (1602–1675), local politician. In 1658 he went bankrupt for £20,000.
- Major-General Thomas Harrison (1606–1660) sided with Parliament in the English Civil War. In 1649 he signed the death warrant of Charles I and in 1660, after the Restoration, was found guilty of regicide and hanged, drawn and quartered.
- Sir Richard Lloyd (1606–1676), English politician who sat in the House of Commons variously between 1628 and 1676. In April 1640, Lloyd was MP for Newcastle-under-Lyme in the Short Parliament.
- Sir Alfred Seale Haslam (1844–1927) engineer, three times Mayor of Newcastle, MP for Newcastle-under-Lyme, 1900–1906
- Josiah Wedgwood, 1st Baron Wedgwood (1872–1943), Josiah Wedgwood IV, great-great-grandson of Josiah Wedgwood and Liberal MP for Newcastle-under-Lyme 1906-1919, then its Labour MP 1919-1942
- Sir Oswald Mosley (1896–1980), founder of British Union of Fascists lived in Apedale Hall in early 1900s
- John David Mack (c. 1899–1957), Labour Party MP for Newcastle-under-Lyme, 1942–1951.
- Stephen Swingler (1915–1969) Labour MP for Stafford, 1945–1950, and for Newcastle-under-Lyme 1951–1969
- John Golding (1931–1999), Labour MP for Newcastle-under-Lyme 1969-1986
- Llin Golding, Baroness Golding (born 1933), Labour MP for Newcastle-under-Lyme 1986-2001
- Jeremy Lefroy (born 1959) Westlands councillor, MP for Stafford since 2010
- Paul Farrelly (born 1962), MP for Newcastle-under-Lyme and journalist
- Karen Bradley (born 1970), MP for Staffordshire Moorlands and Secretary of State for Culture, Media and Sport
- Aaron Bell (born 1980) politician, MP for Newcastle-under-Lyme since 2019
- Gareth Snell (born 1986), graduate of Keele University 2008, leader of the Newcastle-under-Lyme Borough Council 2012–2014 and MP for Stoke-on-Trent Central since 2017
