= Lyme Brook =

Stream in Staffordshire, England

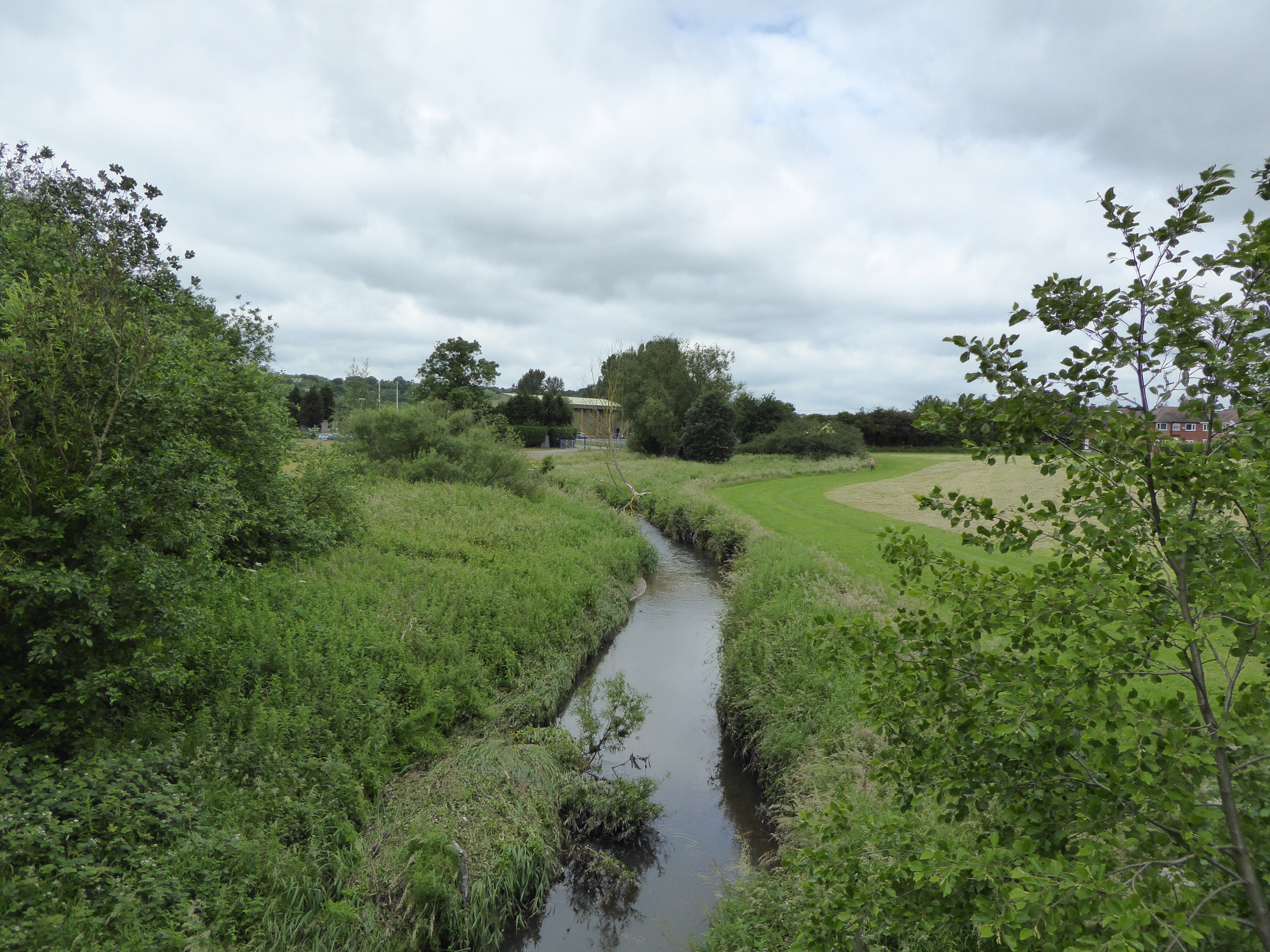
- Lyme Brook from the A500

- Lyme brook within Staffordshire

Location
- Country: England
- Counties: Staffordshire

Physical characteristics
- Mouth
  - location: Hanford, Staffordshire
  - coordinates: 52.979°N 2.203°W
- Length: 4.1 km (2.5 mi)
- Basin size: 31 km^{2} (12 sq mi)
- Progression : Lyme Brook—Trent—Humber

Lyme Brook is a tributary stream of the River Trent, which flows through Newcastle-under-Lyme, and the outlying areas of Stoke-on-Trent in Staffordshire, England.

== Course ==
Prior to the 20th century the upper course of the brook could be traced through the area to the north of Newcastle, but subsequent development and culverting means that only parts are now visible.

To the south of Newcastle town centre, the brook joins with a number of its tributaries including the Silverdale and the Ashfield brooks. This area between Rotterdam and Pool Dam was important historically, as the water from the brooks was dammed to form a protective pool around the ‘new’ motte-and-bailey castle in the 12th century, after which the town is named.

From Pool Dam, the brook has been designated as main river, which flows south-east in a narrow valley, between Clayton and Trent Vale, where it forms the boundary between Newcastle and Stoke. The brook then passes next to the Clayton Wood Training Ground and under the A500 dual carriage-way, joining the Trent near Hanford.

The catchment or drainage basin lies between that of the Fowlea Brook to the north and east, and that of the Park brook to the south, and has an area of 31 square kilometres (12 mi^{2}).

== Floods ==
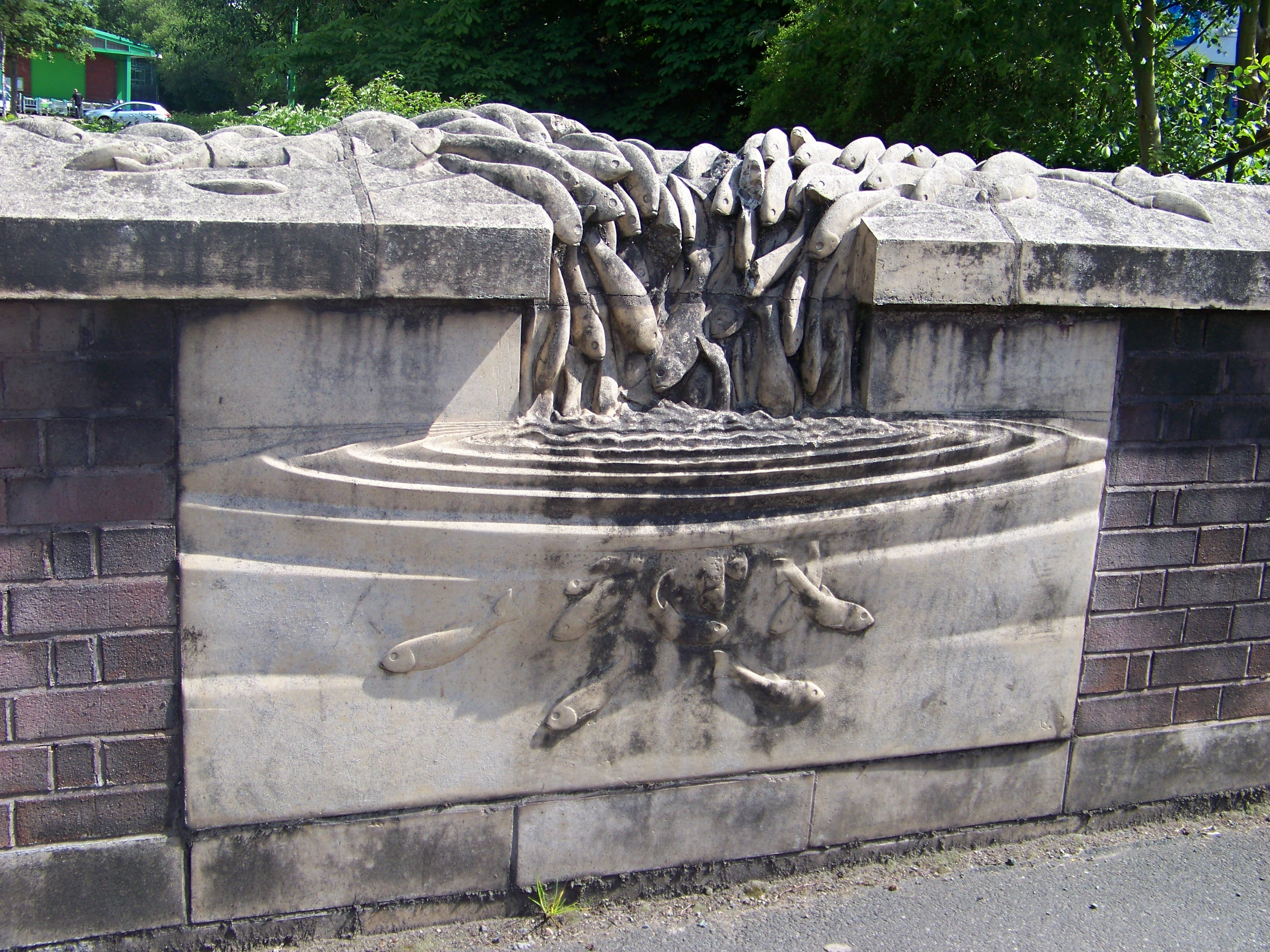
The Return

The brook is capable of causing flooding, and was the subject of a flood alleviation scheme in the 1990s by the National Rivers Authority. The completed scheme was commemorated by a sculpture on the Brook Lane bridge, known as The Return. The 1995 carved stone sculpture by local artist Ian Randall, shows a cascade of fish returning to the brook.

A flood warning service is provided for the brook, and encompasses areas at risk such as, Brook Lane, Hatrell Street and the Lyme Valley sports fields.

== Pollution and ecology ==
Along with other watercourses draining the Potteries such as Ford Green Brook and the Fowlea Brook, Lyme brook suffered from pollution as the area developed following the Industrial Revolution with sewage effluent from Newcastle being discharged into the brook. The building of sewerage treatment works removed the gross pollution, but problems still persisted.

Lyme brook is classed as having poor ecological quality under the Water Framework Directive, having improved from bad in 2015. The bands in the five part framework scale are high, good, moderate, poor and bad. Problems include poor water quality and low levels of aquatic ecology. Work to improve the brook is continuing and examples of improvement include the return of Brown Trout.
