= Berisford =

Berisford is a surname Meaning "Ford Where Barley Grows". Notable people with the surname include:

- Humphrey Berisford (died c. 1588), English recusant
- Norman Berisford (born 1928), English architect, painter, writer, poet, and philanthropist

== See also ==
- Beresford (disambiguation)
- Berrisford
