= Beresford =

Beresford may refer to:

== Places ==
- Beresford, British Columbia
- Beresford, Republic of Ireland
- Beresford, Manitoba
- Beresford, New Brunswick, a former town within Beresford Parish, New Brunswick
- Beresford, South Dakota
- Beresford, Western Australia

== Other uses ==
- Beresford (name)
- 5682 Beresford, an asteroid
- Beresford Hotel, Glasgow, Scotland
- The Beresford, a luxury apartment building on Central Park West in New York City

== See also ==
- Beresford Dale, in Derbyshire, England
- Berisford, a surname
