= Trent Vale =

Suburb of Stoke-on-Trent, England

Coordinates: 52°59′N 2°12′W

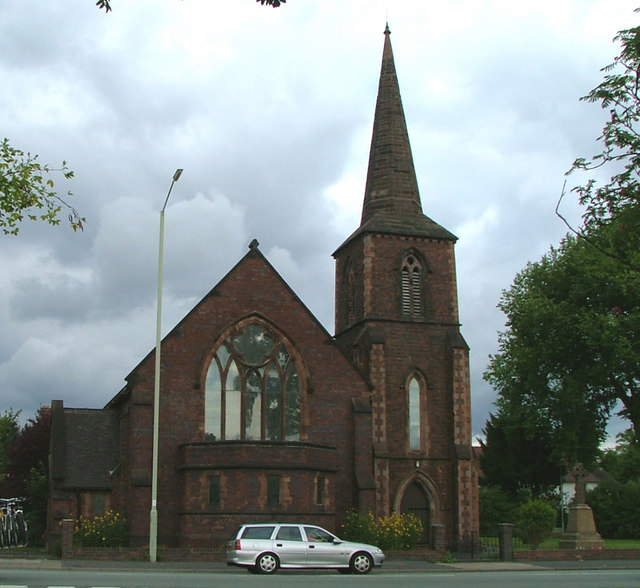
- The Church of St John the Evangelist in Trent Vale

- Location within Staffordshire
- Unitary authority: Stoke-on-Trent
- Ceremonial county: Staffordshire
- Region: West Midlands
- Country: England
- Sovereign state: United Kingdom

Trent Vale is a suburb of Stoke-on-Trent, Staffordshire, England, bordered on the south by Hanford, to the west by Clayton, to the north by Newcastle-under-Lyme, to the southeast by Oakhill and Penkhull to the northeast. The Springfields and Trent Vale ward population at the 2011 census was 6,816.

The area is home to the Clayton Wood Training Ground, owned by Stoke City FC. Employment is provided locally by the Royal Stoke University Hospital.

St. John the Evangelist Church was erected in the early Gothic style in 1843. The architect was Philip Wooton.

The A34 road runs from north to south through the centre of Trent Vale.
