= Hanford, Staffordshire =

Area of Stoke-on-Trent, England

Coordinates: 52.97°N 02.19°W

Hanford
- Location within Staffordshire
- OS grid reference: SJ8742
- District: Stoke-on-Trent
- Shire county: Staffordshire
- Region: West Midlands
- Country: England
- Sovereign state: United Kingdom
- Post town: Stoke-on-Trent
- Postcode district: ST4
- Dialling code: 01782
- Police: Staffordshire
- Fire: Staffordshire
- Ambulance: West Midlands
- UK Parliament: Stoke-on-Trent

St Matthias' parish church, Church Lane, Hanford, Staffordshire

Hanford is an area in Stoke-on-Trent near to Trent Vale.
