= Berresford =

Berresford is a surname. Notable people with the surname include:

- Susan Berresford (born 1943), American foundation executive
- Virginia Berresford (1902–1995), American painter, printmaker, and art gallery owner

== See also ==
- Beresford (name)
- Berrisford
