= Holy Trinity Church, Newcastle-under-Lyme =

Holy Trinity Church
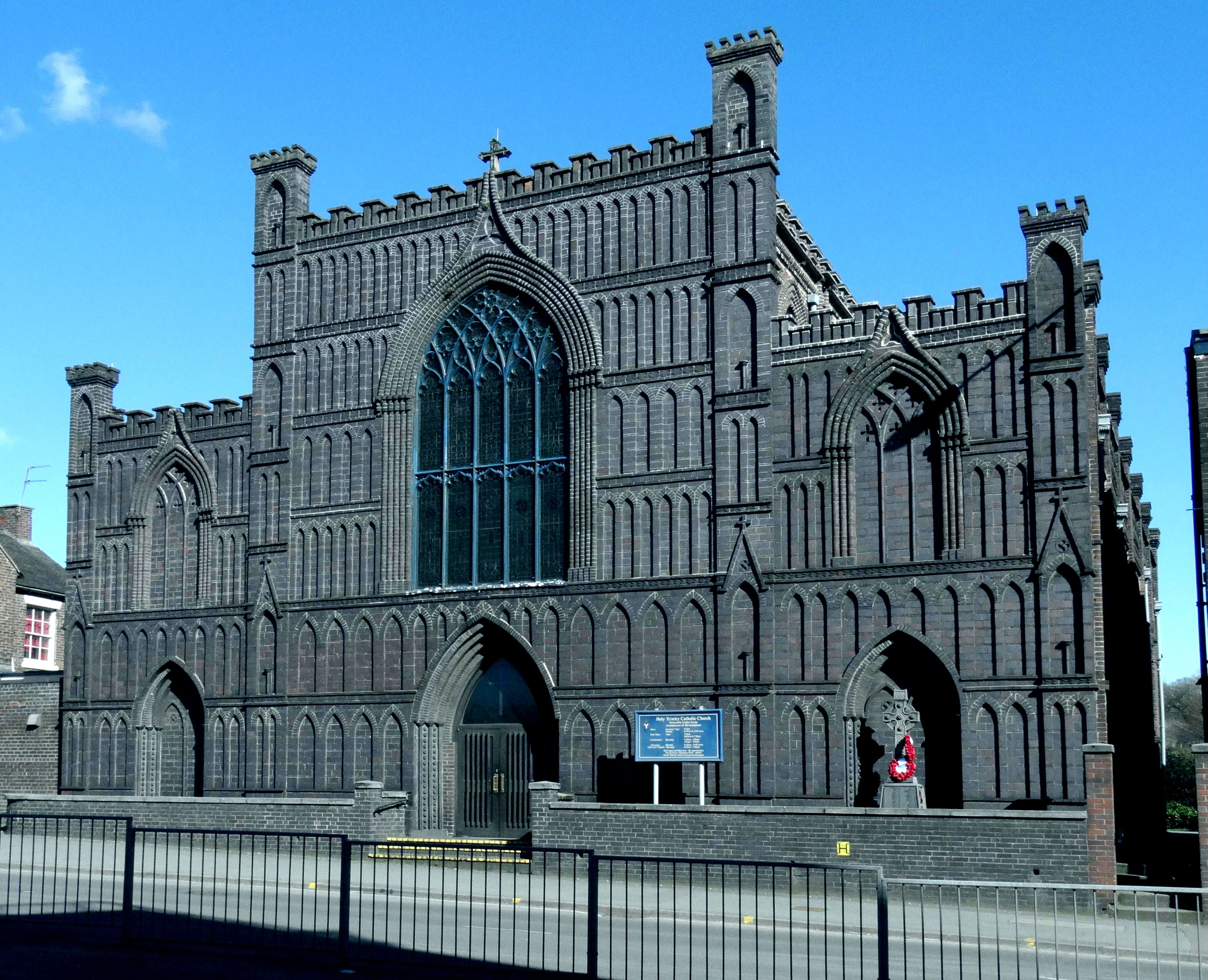
- Holy Trinity Church
- 53.0087°N 2.2236°W
- OS grid reference: SJ 85092 45731
- Location: Newcastle-under-Lyme
- Country: England
- Denomination: Roman Catholic
- Website: Official website

History
- Status: Parish church
- Dedication: Holy Trinity
- Consecrated: 13 May 1834

Architecture
- Functional status: Active
- Heritage designation: Grade II* listed
- Designated: 21 October 1949
- Architect: Fr James Egan
- Style: Gothic Revival

Administration
- Province: Birmingham
- Archdiocese: Birmingham
- Deanery: North Staffordshire
- Parish: Holy Trinity & Sacred Heart

Holy Trinity Church is a Roman Catholic parish church in Newcastle-under-Lyme, Staffordshire, England. It was built between 1833 and 1834, and designed by its priest, Fr James Egan in the Gothic Revival style. While it was described as "the finest modern specimen of ornamental brickwork in the kingdom" when it was built, Nikolaus Pevsner described it as "a crazy effort in blue brick." It is a Grade II* listed building, located on London Road close to the Grosvenor Roundabout.

== History ==
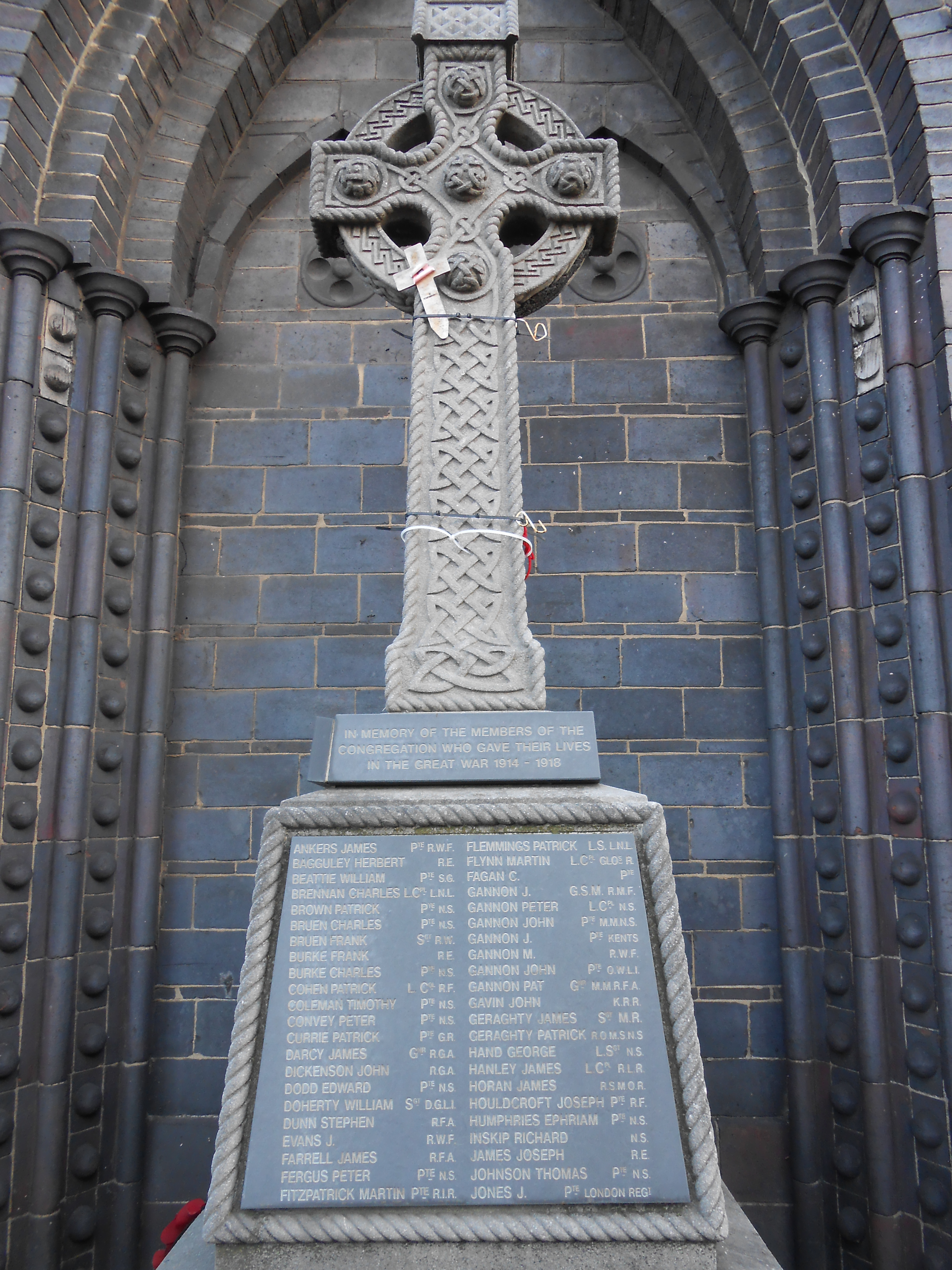
War memorial, outside the church

=== Foundation ===
After the Reformation, from the early 1700s the nearest place for Catholics to celebrate Mass was at Chesterton Hall, the house of the Macclesfield family. Later, in the early 1800s, Catholics went to a room in the Shakespeare Hotel, Brunswick Street, to celebrate Mass. The priest serving the local mission was Fr Louis Gerard. Around 1826, Fr Edward Daniel replaced Fr Gerard. In 1831, Fr James Egan took over the mission in Newcastle-under-Lyme. He had come from Ashley where he built the Chapel of Our Blessed Lady and St John the Baptist.

=== Construction ===
Fr James Egan would go on to design the church after being offered all the necessary bricks to build a permanent Catholic church by a local brick manufacturer. In 1833, construction work started. The front of the church is made of blue vitrified Staffordshire brick. On 13 May 1834, Bishop Thomas Walsh, the Vicar Apostolic of the Midland District opened the church. After the church's opening, it was described as "the finest modern specimen of ornamental brickwork in the kingdom"; however according to Historic England, "two Protestant preachers held a public meeting at Newcastle to denounce the Church of Rome". Until 1849, the north aisle was separate from the church, as it was the presbytery. Until 1864, the south aisle was also separate and was a school. In 1886, restoration work on the church was carried out and a sacristy was built.

== Exterior ==
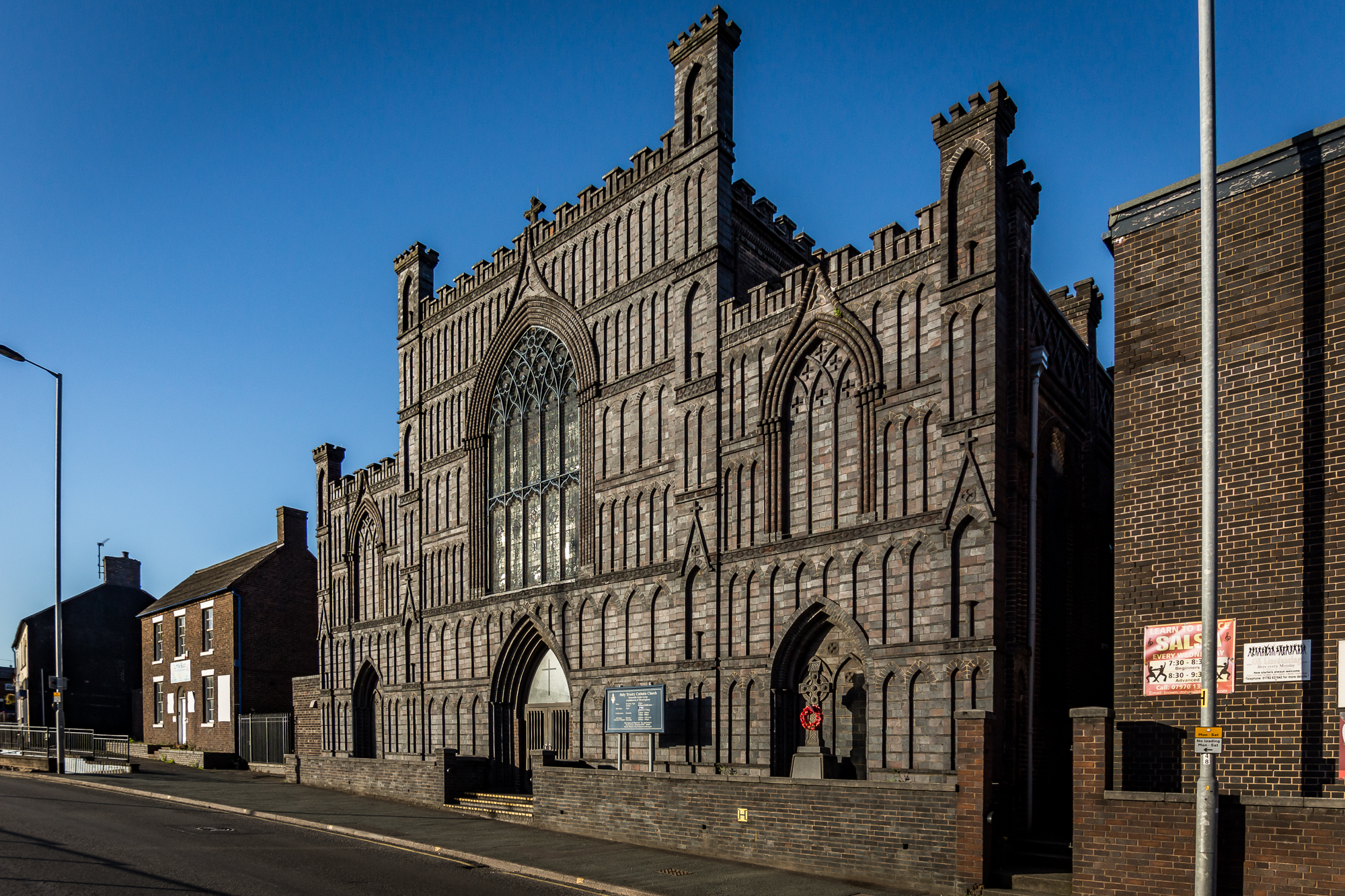

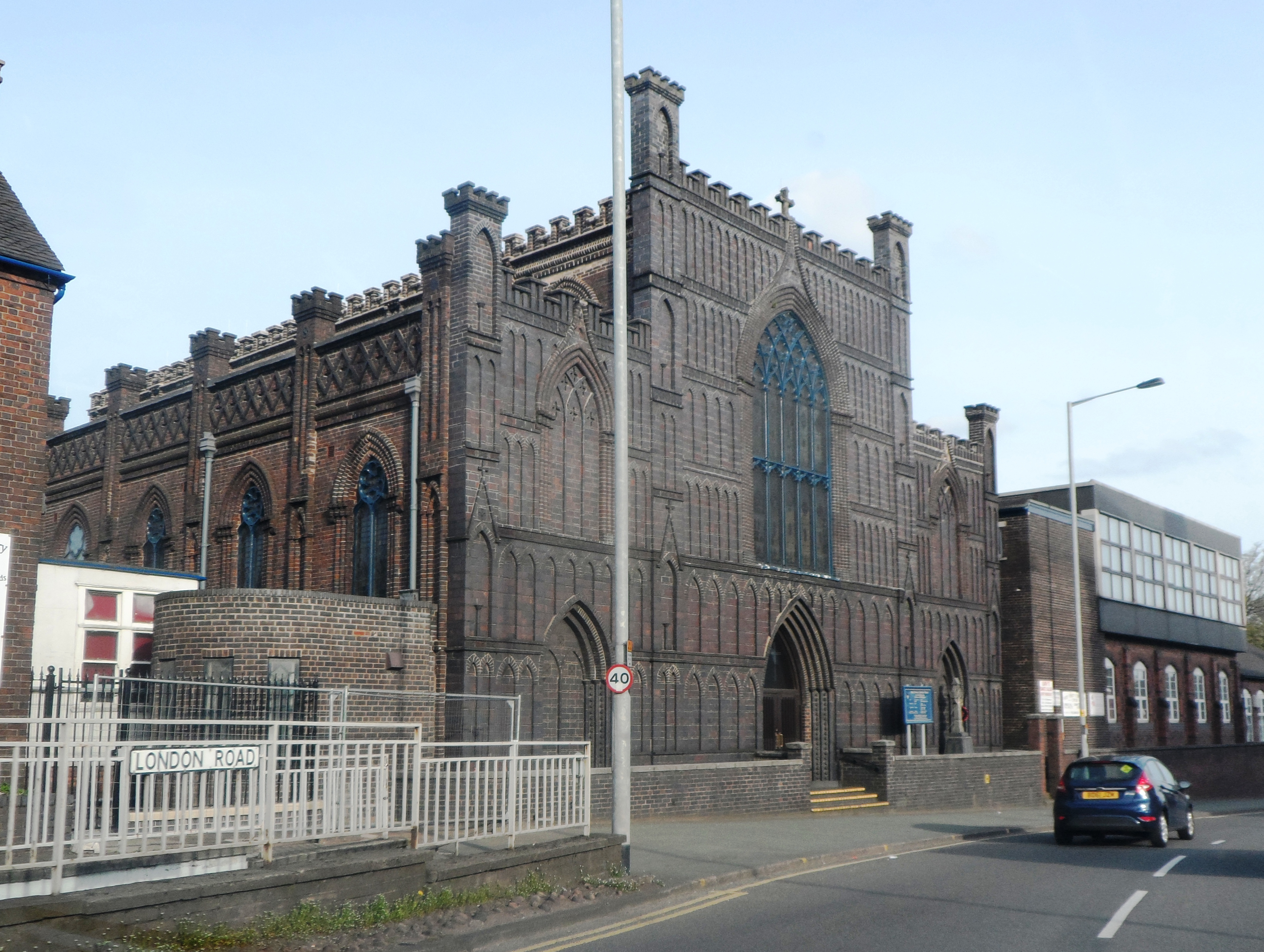

== See also ==
- Archdiocese of Birmingham
