= Berrisford =

Berrisford is a surname. Notable people with the surname include:

- Judith Berrisford (1921–2008), British author
- Simon Berrisford (born 1963), British rower

== See also ==
- Berisford
- Berresford
