= Newcastle-under-Lyme Guildhall =

Municipal building in Newcastle-under-Lyme, Staffordshire, England

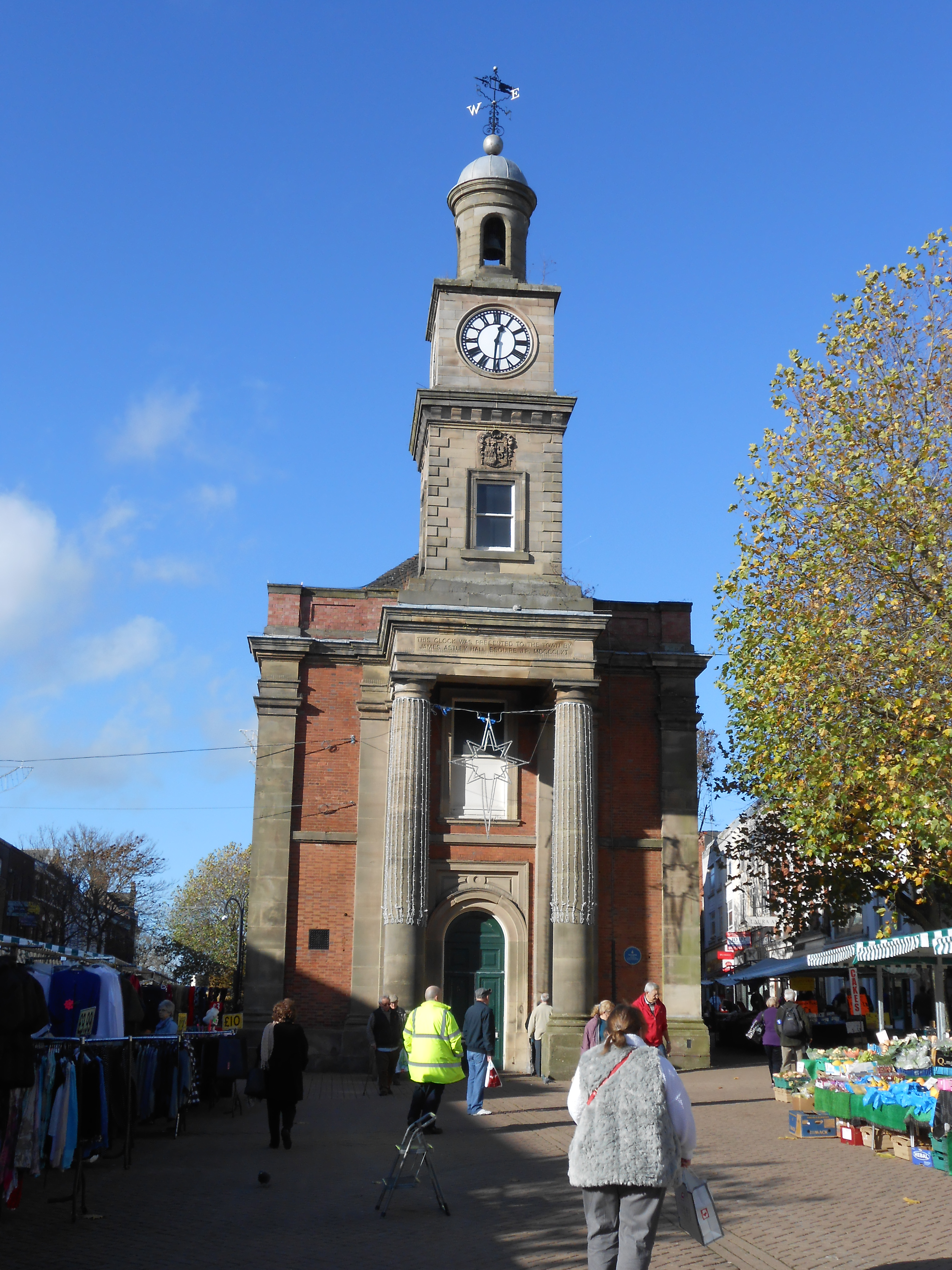

- Location in Staffordshire
- 53.0108°N 2.2269°W
- Location: High Street, Newcastle-under-Lyme

History
- Built: 1713

Listed Building – Grade II
- Designated: 21 October 1949
- Reference no.: 1196523

The Guildhall is a municipal building in High Street, Newcastle-under-Lyme. It is a Grade II listed building. The building, which was completed in 1713, originally served as the town's administrative centre and included an open ground floor that functioned as a market hall.

== History ==
The building was commissioned to replace an earlier guildhall located just to the north of the current building. The new guildhall was completed in November 1713. It was a two-storey rectangular red brick building which was initially open at ground level, with rounded arches on all four sides and three pillars within to support the floor above; this enabled the lower level to be used for a market. The brickwork was ornamented with stone pilasters and topped with a balustraded parapet; the hipped roof was topped by a weatherboarded turret with a gilded weather vane. The upper room was used for meetings of the borough council, for the Quarter Sessions court and for public gatherings. A clock and cupola replaced the turret in the middle of the roof in 1830.

Use of the Guildhall as a market ceased after a new Covered Market was opened in 1854, further along the High Street. Not long afterwards, in 1860-62, the building was significantly altered: the arches on the ground floor were bricked up, a semi-circular extension was added to the north and a new portico and clock tower were built around the entrance on the south side (the new clock being provided by James Astley Hall, a former mayor). These alterations provided space for a new courtroom and expanded civic facilities.

Although facilities for council officers were established in Ironmarket in 1890, the upper floor of the guildhall continued to be the meeting place of Newcastle-under-Lyme Borough Council. (Note: The municipal buildings in Ironmarket, which were designed by Sugden & Sons, J. Blood and Snape & Chapman in the Flemish style, were completed in 1890. The municipal buildings were demolished, to make way for the new library, after council officers moved to the Civic Offices, designed by Bradshaw Gass & Hope, in Merrial Street in 1967. The council then moved again, to new facilities at Castle House in Barracks Road, in 2018. Meetings of the council are now held in the Astley Room, named after the local circus owner Philip Astley, at Castle House.) Monthly meetings of Newcastle Trades Council took place in the guildhall and it also served as a courtroom for the Newcastle Quarter Sessions. The council was accused of "selling off the family silver" when the guildhall was converted for use as a public house in 1999.

The guildhall fell into a state of disrepair before being refurbished in the early years of the 21st century and re-opening as a customer service centre in December 2008. However the guildhall fell vacant after the customer service staff relocated to Castle House in Barracks Road in 2018. It then became a community hub operated by "Support Staffordshire".

== Gallery ==
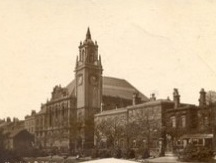
Municipal Buildings in Irongate, erected 1890

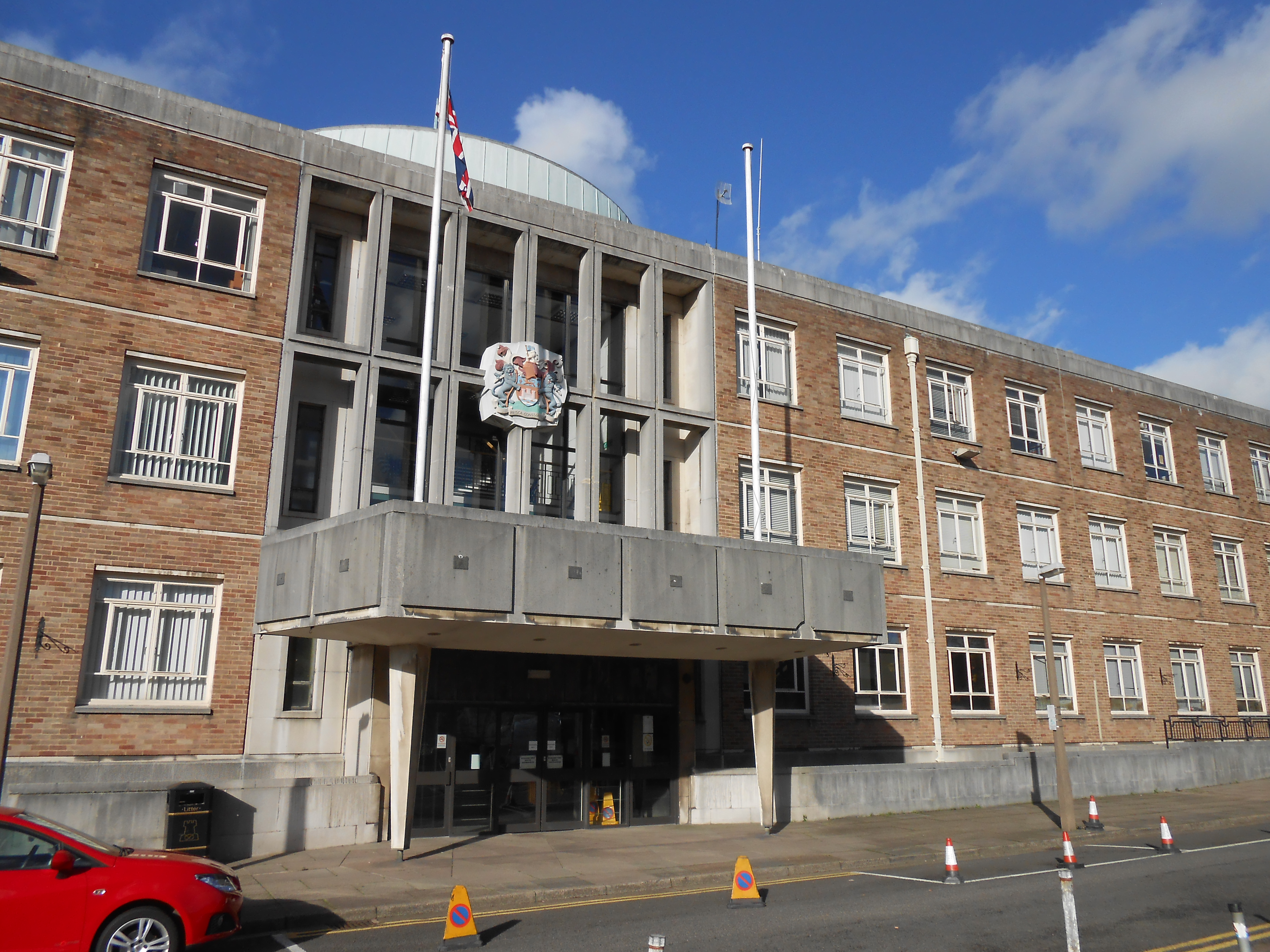
Civic Offices in Murrial Street, erected 1967

== See also ==
- Listed buildings in Newcastle-under-Lyme
