= Staffordshire blue brick =

Type of construction brick

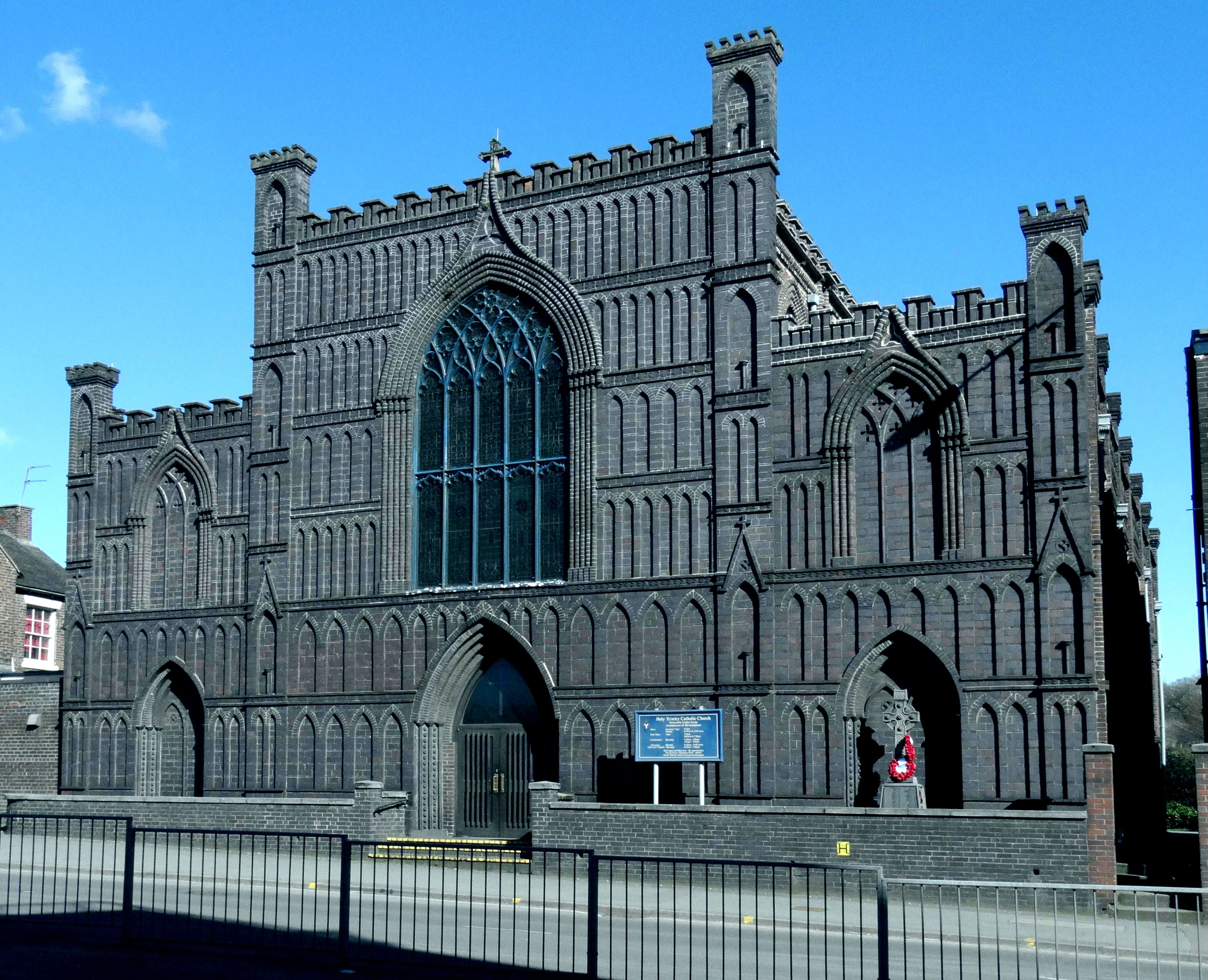
Staffordshire blue brick, used here in the construction of Holy Trinity Church, Newcastle-under-Lyme for its appearance rather than its high strength. Nikolaus Pevsner described it as "a crazy effort in blue brick".

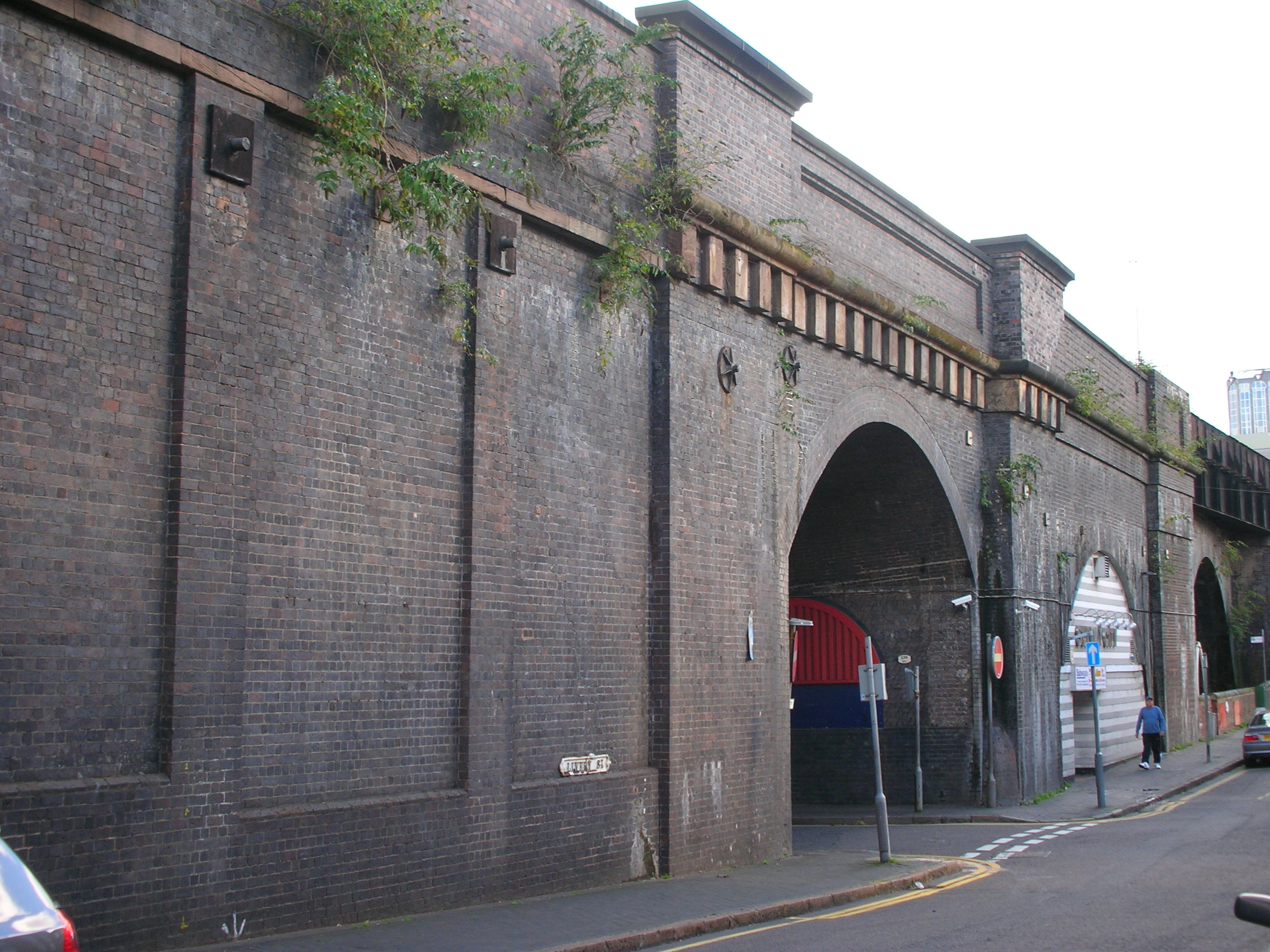
Viaduct carrying the line and platforms of Birmingham Snow Hill station

Staffordshire blue brick is a strong type of construction brick, originally made in Staffordshire, England.

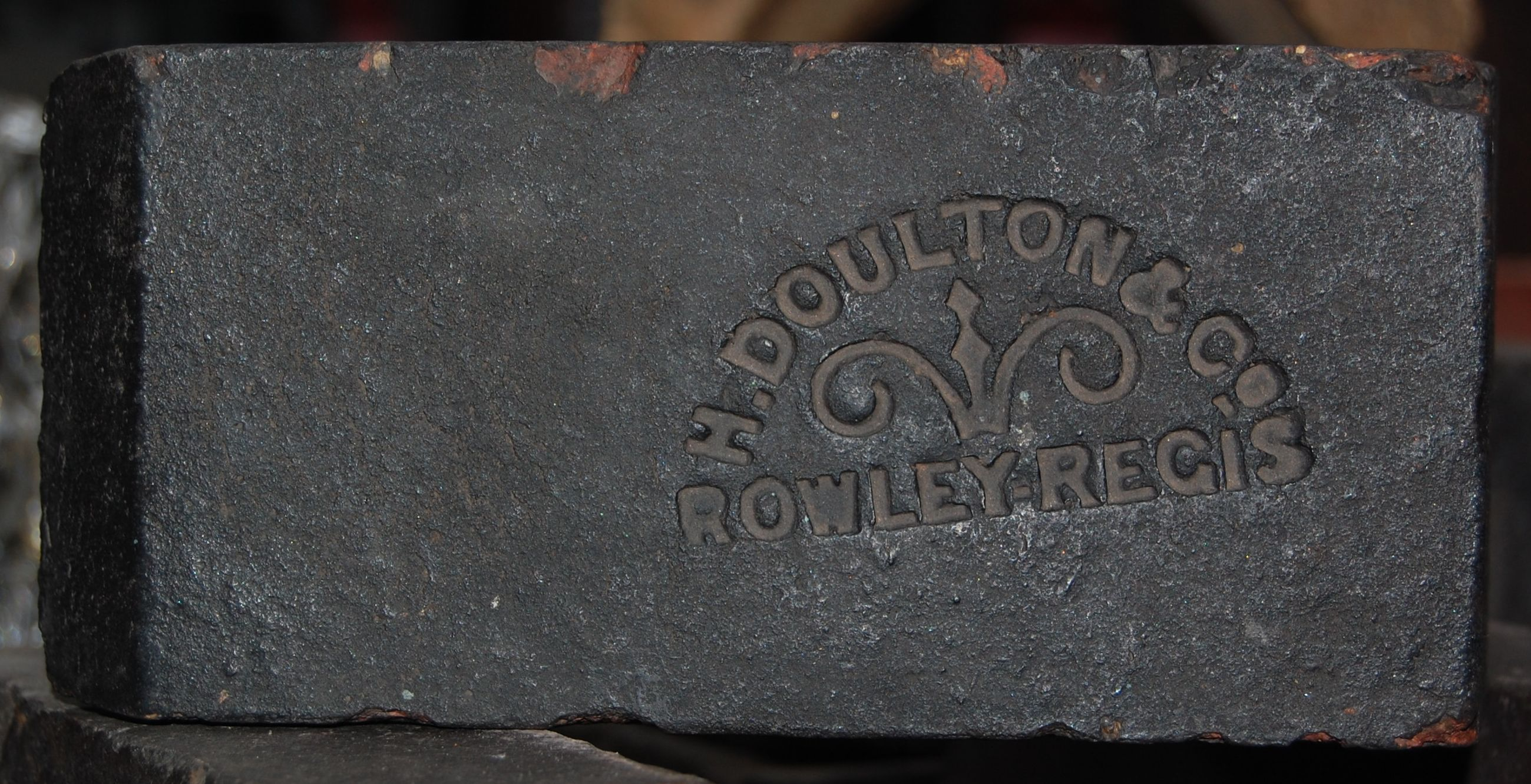
Brick made by H Doulton & Co. of Rowley Regis, displayed in the Black Country Living Museum

The brick is made from the local red clay, Etruria marl, which when fired at a high temperature in a low-oxygen reducing atmosphere takes on a deep blue colour and attains a very hard surface with high crushing strength and low water absorption.

Brickworks were a key industry across the whole of the Black Country throughout the 19th and 20th centuries, and were considered so important that they were designated as a reserved occupation during the Second World War. The Black Country was a major producer of clay for brickmaking, often mined from beneath the 30 foot Staffordshire coal seam. The industry dates back to at least the 17th century, however brickworks really took off in the 19th century. A key date is 1851 when the Joseph Hamblet brickworks were founded in West Bromwich, which became one of the largest producers of Staffordshire blue bricks. Other sites produced these as well, including Albion in West Bromwich, Cakemore works at Blackheath, Springfield at Rowley Regis, John Sadler, Blades and New Century at Oldbury, Coneygre at Tipton, and Bentley Hall near Darlaston.

This type of brick was used for foundations as well as being extensively used for bridges and tunnels in canal construction, and later, for railways. Its lack of porosity makes it suitable for capping brick walls, and its hard-wearing properties make it ideal for steps and pathways. It is also used as a general facing brick for decorative reasons. Staffordshire blue bricks have traditionally been rated as "Class A" with a water absorption of less than 4.5%.

== See also ==
- Engineering brick
