= Fanny Deakin =

English politician (1883–1968)

Fanny Deakin (1883 – 1968) was an English politician who campaigned for better nourishment of young children and maternity care for mothers.

== Biography ==
Deakin was born in Silverdale, a mining village near Newcastle-under-Lyme, into a large but poor family in 1883. On leaving school early she commenced work on the same farm where her family lived. Motivated by the poverty she observed around her, she entered politics and was the first woman to be elected onto Wolstanton Council as a Labour member in 1923. In 1927, she retained her seat, this time standing as a Communist. She was a popular with local people, who nicknamed her "Red Fanny" after she visited the Soviet Union in 1927 and 1930.

Of her five children only one survived into adulthood. In an era of high infant mortality she campaigned for better maternity care of women and free milk for children under five. Along with unemployed miners, she met at Downing Street Prime Minister Ramsay MacDonald and as a result of this meeting local councils began to give free milk to pregnant mothers and children up to the age of five.

One of her friends was found guilty of inciting a riot and as a result of her evidence in providing an alibi she was charged with perjury and spent nine months in prison.

In 1934, she became a County Councillor in the recently merged Newcastle-under-Lyme Council, continuing her advocacy of child and maternal welfare issues through a number of different committees. During the war years she could be seen working with others in the Catholic Church showing children how to put on gas masks. In 1941 she became the first communist to be appointed alderman in Newcastle-under-Lyme Borough, with the honour being extended to county level in 1946.

== Legacy ==
Her advocacy of mother and child welfare issues was recognised when Fanny Deakin Maternity Home was opened in 1947 in Newcastle-under-Lyme Borough. She is still popularly remembered through the many children born there and through a G.P ward named after her in a local hospital.

In 1991, Joyce Holliday wrote "Go See Fanny Deakin!", in which Fanny Deakin appears as heroine in a play centred on the mining community of Silverdale. It has subsequently been broadcast by BBC local radio. Joyce Holliday also wrote "Silverdale People" which includes a biography of Fanny Deakin.

Staffordshire County Council holds a collection of Fanny Deakins papers in its Newcastle Library.

Deakin's Yard, a large student accommodation building in Brunswick street in the centre of Newcastle-under-Lyme, is named in her honour.
