= Oliver Sadler =

English cricketer

Personal information
- Full name: Oliver James Sadler
- Born: 2 April 1987 (age 39); Newcastle-under-Lyme, Staffordshire, England
- Batting: Right-handed
- Bowling: Slow left-arm orthodox

Domestic team information
- Years: Team
- 2006–2008: Oxford University
- 2006–2008: Cheshire
- 2008: Oxford UCCE

Career statistics
Competition	First-class
Matches	4
Runs scored	250
Batting average	50.00
100s/50s	–/–
Top score	77
Balls bowled	302
Wickets	3
Bowling average	34.00
5 wickets in innings	–
10 wickets in match	–
Best bowling	3/41
Catches/stumpings	1/–
- Source: Cricinfo, 21 February 2019

Oliver James Sadler (born 2 April 1987) is an English former first-class cricketer.

Sadler was born at Newcastle-under-Lyme and attended Oriel College, Oxford. While at Oxford he made his debut in first-class cricket for Oxford University against Cambridge University at Oxford in 2006. He played in the same fixtures in 2007 and 2008, as well as playing a first-class match for Oxford UCCE against Middlesex in 2008. (Note: Oxford UCCE differed from Oxford University Cricket Club in that it was open to students at Oxford Brookes University, whereas Oxford University Cricket Club is exclusively for students of the constituent colleges of the University of Oxford.) Appearing in four first-class matches, Sadler scored 250 runs at an average of 50.00, with a high score of 77. With his slow left-arm orthodox bowling, he also took 3 wickets. Sadler played minor counties cricket for Cheshire from 2006–2008, making six appearances in the Minor Counties Championship.
