= Norman Berisford =

English architectural designer

Norman A. J. Berisford (born 1928 in Newcastle-under-Lyme, Staffordshire) is an English architectural designer, university lecturer, artist, author, poet and philanthropist.

Berisford is notable because he was one of the first architectural designers to recognise the importance of psychology and the use of lighting in interior design as published in his paper The Psychological Aspects of Lighting in Interior Design.

Berisford is co-author of A History of Interior Design (1983, Rhodec International University) and The Complete Poetry of Norman AJ Berisford (2016, L.R. Price Publications Ltd).

His water colour paintings have been sold at auction with the proceeds going to the Kemp Hospice charity.

Berisford lives in Worcestershire with his wife, Margaret.
