= E. S. Turner =

English writer (1909–2006)

E. S. Turner OBE
- Born: Ernest Sackville Turner; 17 November 1909; Liverpool, England
- Died: 6 July 2006 (aged 96)
- Occupations: Author, journalist
- Spouses: Helen Martin (m. 1937; died 1968) Roberta Hewitt (m. 1971)
- Children: 2

Ernest Sackville Turner OBE (17 November 1909 – 6 July 2006) was an English freelance journalist and writer who wrote 20 published books, including Boys Will Be Boys (Michael Joseph, 1948), The Phoney War on the Home Front (St. Martin's Press, 1961), and What The Butler Saw (Penguin, 1962), and contributing to the Times Literary Supplement, London Review of Books, and regularly to the English satirical weekly magazine Punch (the latter for more than 50 years).

== Early life and education ==
E. S. Turner was born in the Wavertree Garden suburb of Liverpool in the North West of England on 17 November 1909. His father, Frederick William Turner, "a churchgoer and a teetotaller, [and] a desk-man in the Post Office Engineering Department in Liverpool," was a descendant of Sir Barnard Turner, an Alderman and sheriff in London who commanded troops attempting to curb looting in the 1780 Gordon Riots in 1780, but who later died penniless less than a month into Parliament's assembly, after his election in 1784. Turner's mother, Bertha Pixton Norbury, was an amateur portrait and landscape painter, and oversaw a home "built for a class… [her son E.S. thought] extinct, that of ‘meritorious artisans’", with a "family bookcase... weighted with the massed works of Swedenborg… and a ‘splendid’ volume called The Bible in Pitman's Shorthand."

Turner's first school was in Shrewsbury, where he is said to have been "a good pupil", winning "a few prizes" and enjoying "memorising passages of Macaulay's Lays." He went on to Orme Boys' School in Newcastle-under-Lyme, and "[a]lthough he had the reserved, courteous and erudite air of an Oxbridge don", Turner never went on to attend university. At the age of 17 his father presented him with "an ancient typewriter [purchased] for a fiver from a passing lorry", supporting his desire to write.

== Career ==
=== Early career ===
Turner published his first piece in the Dundee Courier in 1927. He applied for a "day job" with the Glasgow Evening Times that same year, where he became "a sharp eye… and in time a sharp voice." There, he progressed from "office junior to the sub-editors' bench and then became one of the paper's cub reporters… and [later] was made editor of the paper's Diary." Stating this another way, Jonathan Sale of The Guardian described it as his"work[ing] his way up from copy boy to subeditor, reporter and gossip column editor." At the Evening Times, he recalled "the staggered newspapers, four mornings and three evenings, all receptive to freelance contributions" and that the "subs... were a profane lot" that "knew their jobs."

A perk of the Evening Times work was to be allowed travel on the maiden voyage of the RMS Queen Mary in May 1936, from Southampton, England to New York city in the U.S.—"About a hundred reporters", he [said] "each of us desperate to find a stowaway"—one of a series of ocean voyages which he wrote about. Such travels contributed to two later pseudonymous Rupert Lang novels, and to a final London Review of Books (LRB) piece written with his first hand information on ocean liners.

After the 1936 voyages, he spent "some months" working at Glasgow Evening Citizen and then at the Scottish Daily Express. At the Daily Express, a fellow sub was prominent British journalist James Cameron, who he described as "a good friend, a brilliant reporter." In this period between the wars, he added voyages on liners flying under the flags of Nazi Germany and fascist Italy, as well as of the Anchor Line, from Glasgow, and did a motor tour in "swastika-hung" Germany in a Morgan three-wheeled automobile. Turner moved toward the decision to go freelance over these years, formally doing so in 1938.

=== War years ===
After the onset of war in 1939, he continued to write for various publications, even after he joined the Royal Artillery in 1941. He was able to contribute during his spare time in the Army, being based in the UK throughout the hostilities. At one point, whilst he was on leave, his anti-aircraft unit actually saw action when they shot down a German bomber. Realising his writing talents, the Army 'top brass' decided to put him to work in a more appropriate area – helping to set up and publish Soldier, the magazine of the British Army. This contributed to his promotion to the rank of major in 1946, coinciding with his appointment as Literary editor of the magazine. He held this title even after 'demob', until 1957.

=== Middle years ===
In 1948 Michael Joseph's publishing firm issued his first book, Boys Will Be Boys: The Story of Sweeney Todd, Deadwood Dick, Sexton Blake, Billy Bunter, Dick Barton, et al. – usually truncated to Boys Will Be Boys. This was an in-depth examination of the "Boys' Weekly" genré, also known as 'story papers', 'penny dreadfuls' or 'bloods' (due to the violent nature of the prose). He carried out research for the book, ploughing through numerous back-numbers of the various publications.

For his second book, however, he changed direction completely, producing the 1950 non-fiction work Roads to Ruin: A Shocking History of Social Progress, which was a forthright insight into the British class system, and the resistance of the upper class to significant change. Robert Kee, reviewing the book, wrote that Turner had "selected a number of prominent battles for reform from within the great historical development of the period, and has concentrated for our delight on some of the thought processes that tried to prevent the reforms from taking place. He has done this wittily and coherently, so his book is a success." The politician Tony Benn often quoted passages from the book in the House of Commons to illustrate points he was trying to make, and especially in 1992, during one particular debate on foxhunting. Turner was also quoted by another politician, Gerald Kaufman, during a 1996 debate on homosexuality in the Armed Forces.

During the 1950s, as a now permanent freelance writer, Turner contributed regularly to Punch Magazine, the leading satirical magazine with the accent on humour and pastiche. This source of income enabled him to concentrate more on writing books. Turner's literary flexibility was illustrated when he wrote a Betjeman-style pastiche for the Royal wedding of The Princess Anne and Mark Phillips on 14 November 1973, subsequently quoted in an obituary by Miles Kington in 2006.

In all, some 19 works by Turner were published in book form during his most productive period, including two novels under the pseudonym of "Rupert Lang."

=== Late career ===
E. S. Turner contributed many pieces in his later years to publications such as the Times Literary Supplement and the London Review of Books. At the age of 89, he published "Unholy Pursuits", which took as its subject the incidence of Anglican clergymen working anonymously as journalists (a profession considered well beneath them at the time). Its 1998 release coincided with him being dropped by his regular publishers. His final article was published posthumously in the magazine "The Oldie" in September 2006. Turner died in London on 6 July 2006.

== Critical appraisal ==
Appraisal in retrospect looks at Turner's dedication to freelance writing—Jonathan Sale referred to him as "the patron saint of freelancing"—and has focused on his energy, productivity, the scope of his writing, and on its inherent humanity. Andrew O'Hagan, in his 1998 LRB retrospective, noted that while Turner's fingers had always been light on the keyboard, his writing was "with a strongly human pulse just under the skin, a richness of personal feeling in the blood."

The Telegraph noted in its obituary that Turner, over "succeeding decades... produced a stream of books... praised by reviewers; it was said that the author had invented a new kind of book which demonstrated the British genius for tremendous trifles." Miles Kington, a fellow journalist intersecting with Turner at Punch recalls Turner at editorial lunches:

"A lot of the writers were rather arrogantly self-effacing… but Ernest always seemed to me like an elder statesman. He knew how to do it. He still does. He would come into those meetings with the most extraordinary ideas. 'Have you noticed the way the French… at those village markets they always have diagrams and suchlike of the human body, always worrying over themselves.' And then he'd be off writing a funny piece. He takes hold of a subject, advertising or boys’ magazines, and he causes you to feel you’ve learned everything there is to know about the subject... And that's not all… his parodies of Betjeman are better than Betjeman.’

Some mention is made of political leanings—O'Hagan refers to Turner as "never a left-wing diehard" and as having a "rightwing persona (which was only partly a pose)"—but these are not thoroughly explored, and during a House of Commons debate on the foxhunting issue, Labour MP Tony Benn quoted from Roads to Ruin: A Shocking History of Social Progress (1950), the book where Turner exposed the upper class's "disgraceful rearguard action…" against reforms such as "abolition of child chimney sweeps and the repeal of laws under which convicted criminals could be hung, drawn and quartered."

With regard to the correctness of his writing, when viewed from a 21st-century perspective, O'Hagan writes that "[t]he Britain Mr Turner writes about may (like Punch) no longer be here… There's always a whole new set of things you're not allowed to laugh at… you can't laugh at newsagents. You can't snigger at class, or Princess Diana, even if you're the sort of person who might always have done so. Mr Turner might say we fought for the right to say farewell to Smith, the right to meet Patel. But it would not be a popular thing to say."

== Personal life ==
Turner met Helen Martin from New York City in the U.S., and they married in 1937 and saw 30 anniversaries; they had two daughters, Patricia and Jill. Helen died in 1968. After his first wife's death, Turner was travelling in Samarkand doing a travel article for the Sunday Telegraph and met Belfast-born Roberta Hewitt, a housing manager, and they married in 1971. She, and daughters Patricia and Jill from the marriage to Helen, survived Turner at his death in 2006.

A formal man and an Edwardian, Ernest Sackville Turner is said to have "clung to the dignity of his formal style and title":

"[W]hen his local paper, the Richmond and Twickenham Times, modestly expanded ES to Ernest in a puff for... his final book, the solecism prompted a modest rebuke… in a letter to the editor… [where Turner declared] 'The first-naming of all and sundry is the curse of the age' [and where he] went on to wonder if the paper's then proprietor, David Dimbleby, would care to be known as 'Dave.'"

In the 1998 LRB interview, O'Hagan noted, "Sometimes Mr Turner can't think of an answer to one of my questions. But when he sits at the typewriter, and begins to write, great swathes of his story come clean. He would later send me these typed pages. And they sit here in front of me now, covered in shadows of print, and they speak of a man altogether present." O'Hagan goes on to quote the author of 80 years of journalism, 50 years of Punch contributions, and 20 published books, to say, "I don't know how you’ll get a whole article out of me... ‘I haven't a whole lot to say.’"

== Published works ==
The following are some of Turner's main book-length published works, with sources as indicated:

- Boys Will Be Boys: The Story of Sweeney Todd, Deadwood Dick, Sexton Blake, Billy Bunter, Dick Barton et al. (1948), a study of the penny dreadfuls, a Victorian pulp hero genre, a study receiving "enthusiastic notices" in the U.K., The New Yorker and Time, so successful it went to reprint twice in the first week of publication.
- Roads to Ruin: A Shocking History of Social Progress (1950), on the upper class's "disgraceful rearguard action…" against reforms such as "abolition of child chimney sweeps and the repeal of laws under which convicted criminals could be hung, drawn and quartered."
- The Shocking History of Advertising (1952), as its name implies, published by Michael Joseph.
- The Third Pip (1952), novel, under the pseudonym Rupert Lang, published by Constable.
- Maiden Voyage (1954), novel, under the pseudonym Rupert Lang.
- A History of Courting (1954), as its name implies, translated into the French as L'Histoire de la Tactique Amoureuse, published by Michael Joseph, ISBN 0860258173.
- Gallant Gentlemen (1956), an historical look at British officers, published by Michael Joseph.
- Call the Doctor (1958), a social history of British physicians and medical practitioners, published by St. Martin's Press, see , accessed 28 May 2015.
- All Heaven in a Rage (1964), a history of human cruelty towards animals.
- The Phoney War on the Home Front (1961), study of restrictions and public ill-temper in Great Britain before The Blitz.
- What the Butler Saw: Two Hundred and Fifty Years of the Servant Problem (1963), a critical survey of employer and employed, "in service."
- Hemlock Lane (1968), novel, under his own name.
- May It Please Your Lordship (1972), a social history of English judgeships, published by Penguin, ISBN 0141390832.
- Amazing Grace: The Great Days of Dukes (1975), a social history of English dukedoms.
- Dear Old Blighty (1980), an account of life 'on the home front' in Britain during the Great War, 1914–1918,
- Unholy Pursuits: The Wayward Parsons of Grub Street (1998), a history of the journalistic moonlighting by Anglican clergymen.
