= Newcastle-under-Lyme =

Market town in Staffordshire, England

- Town
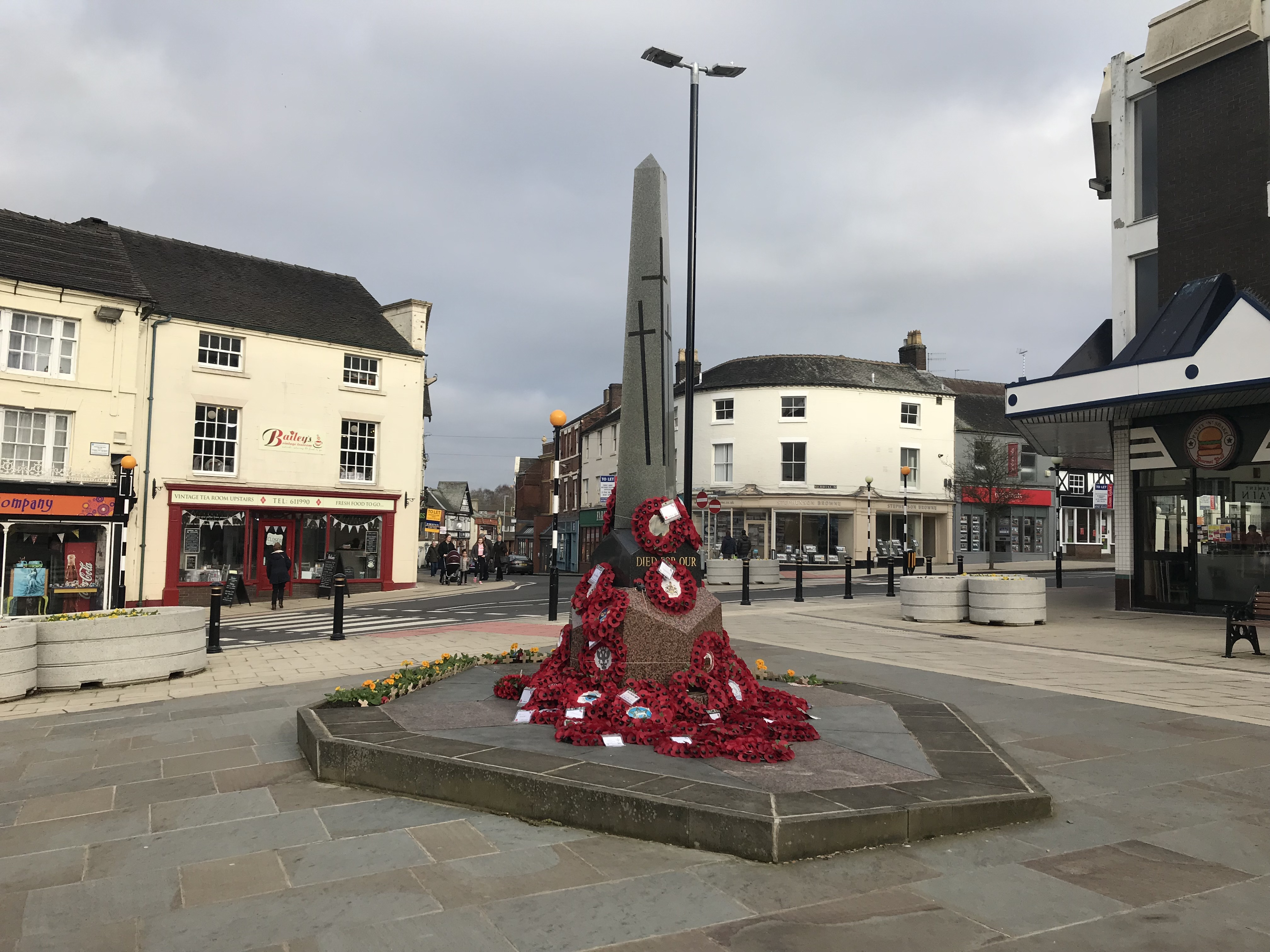
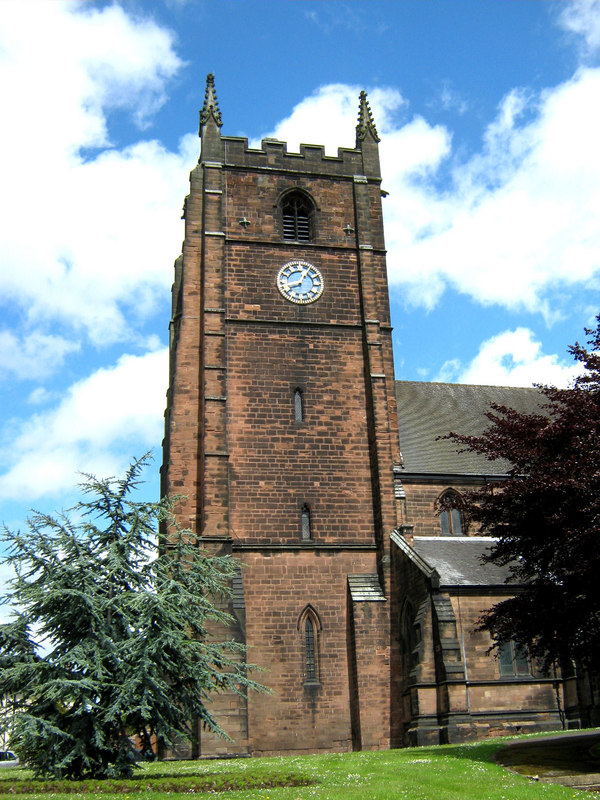
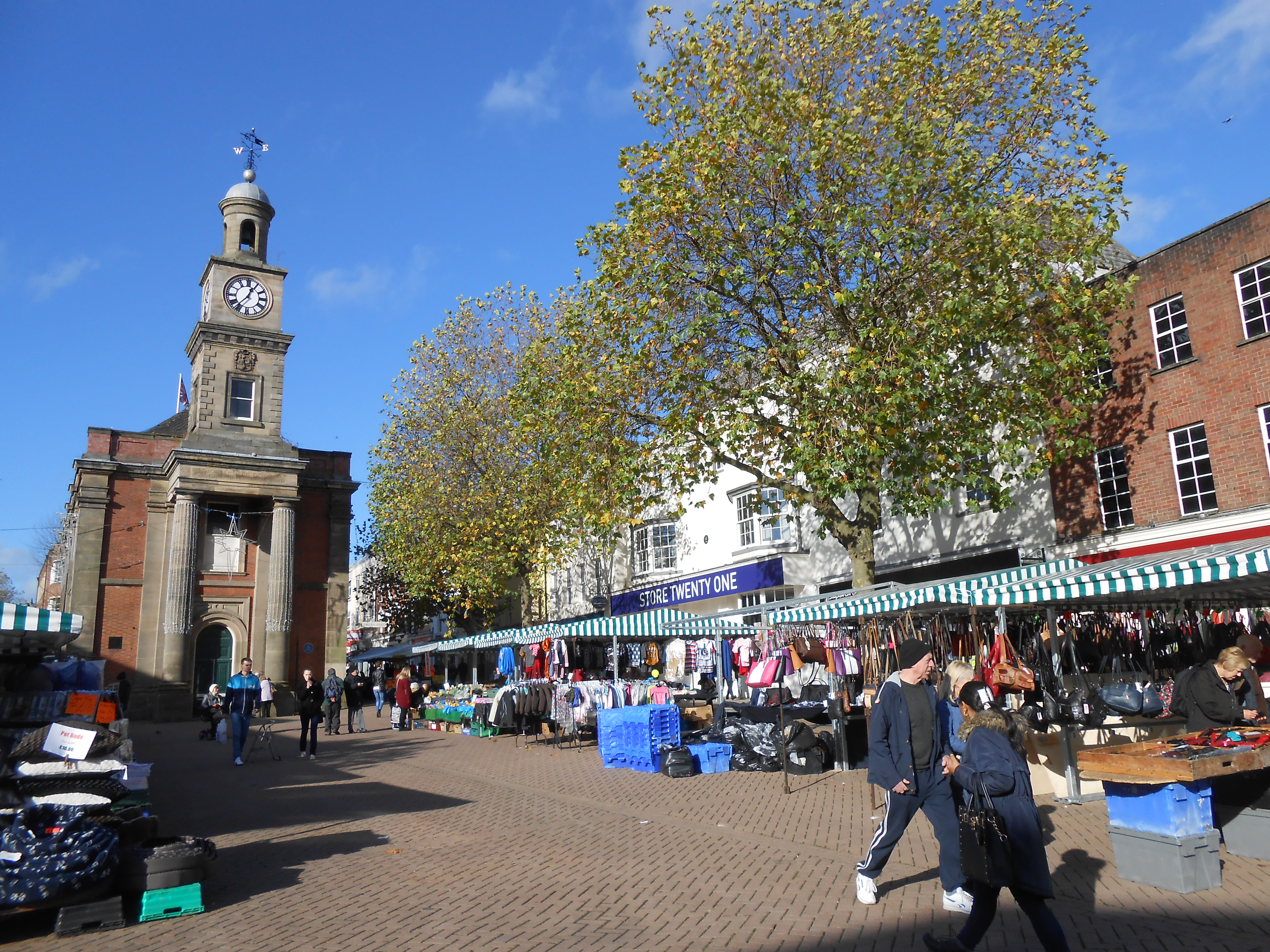
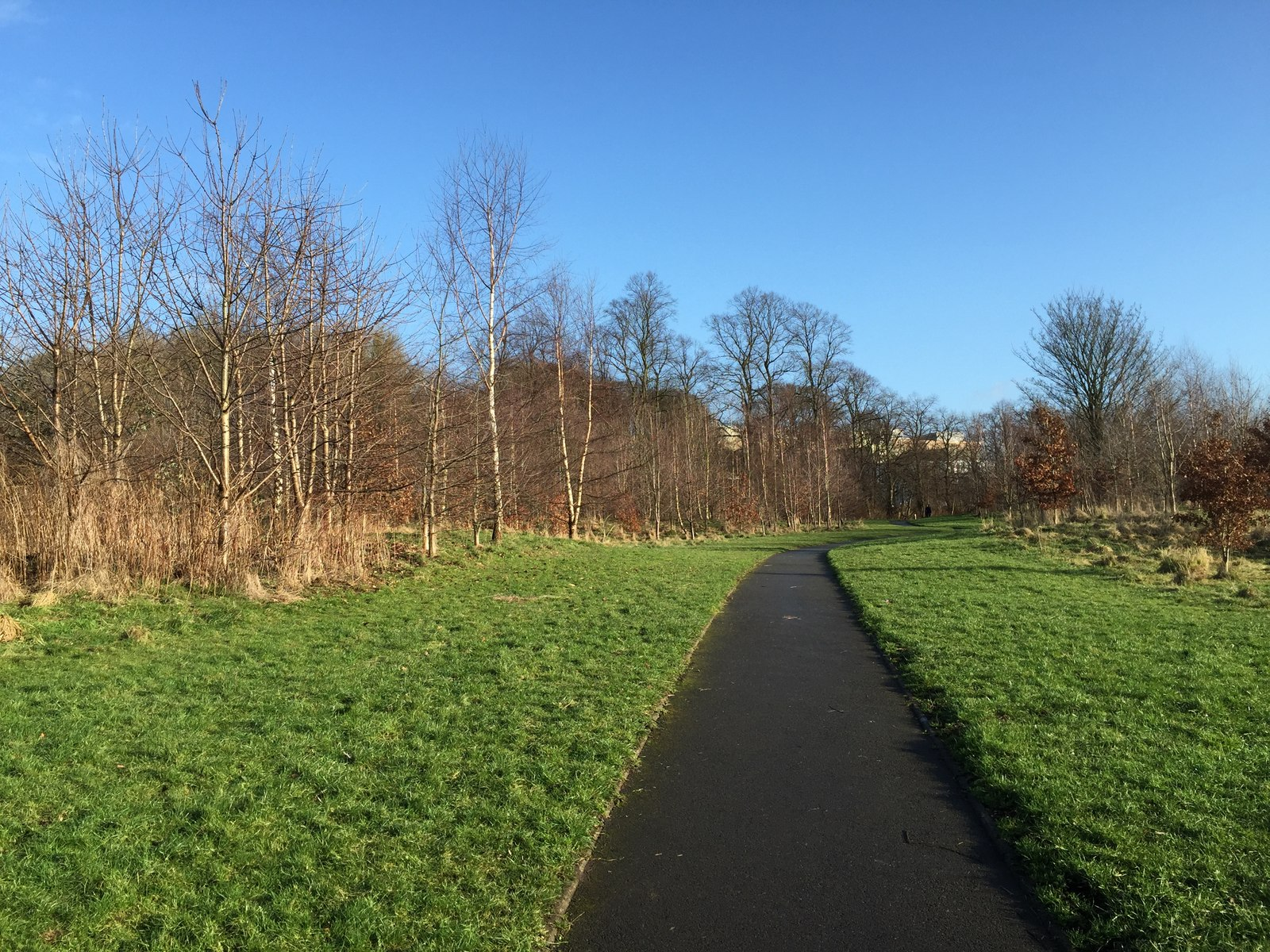
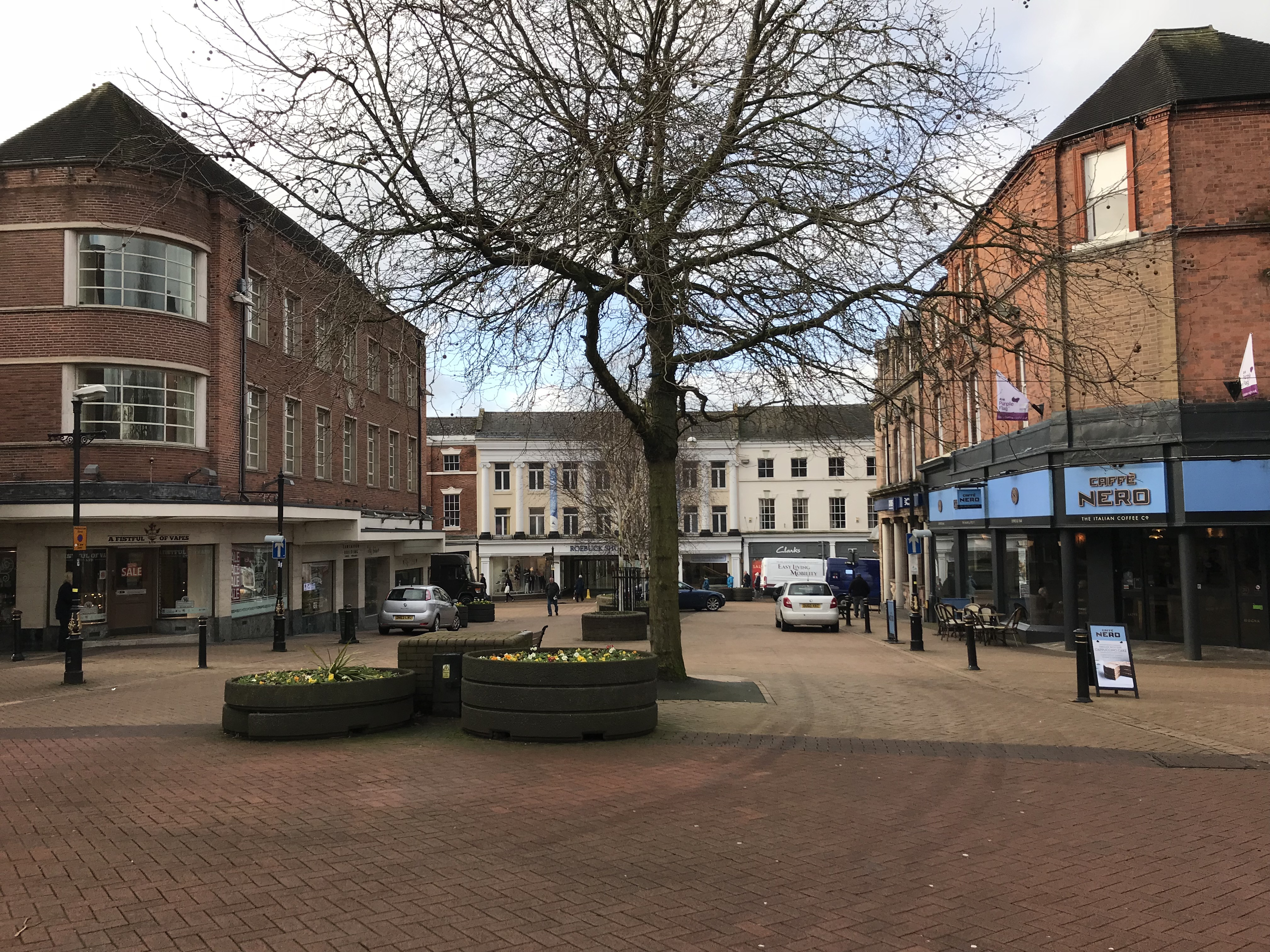
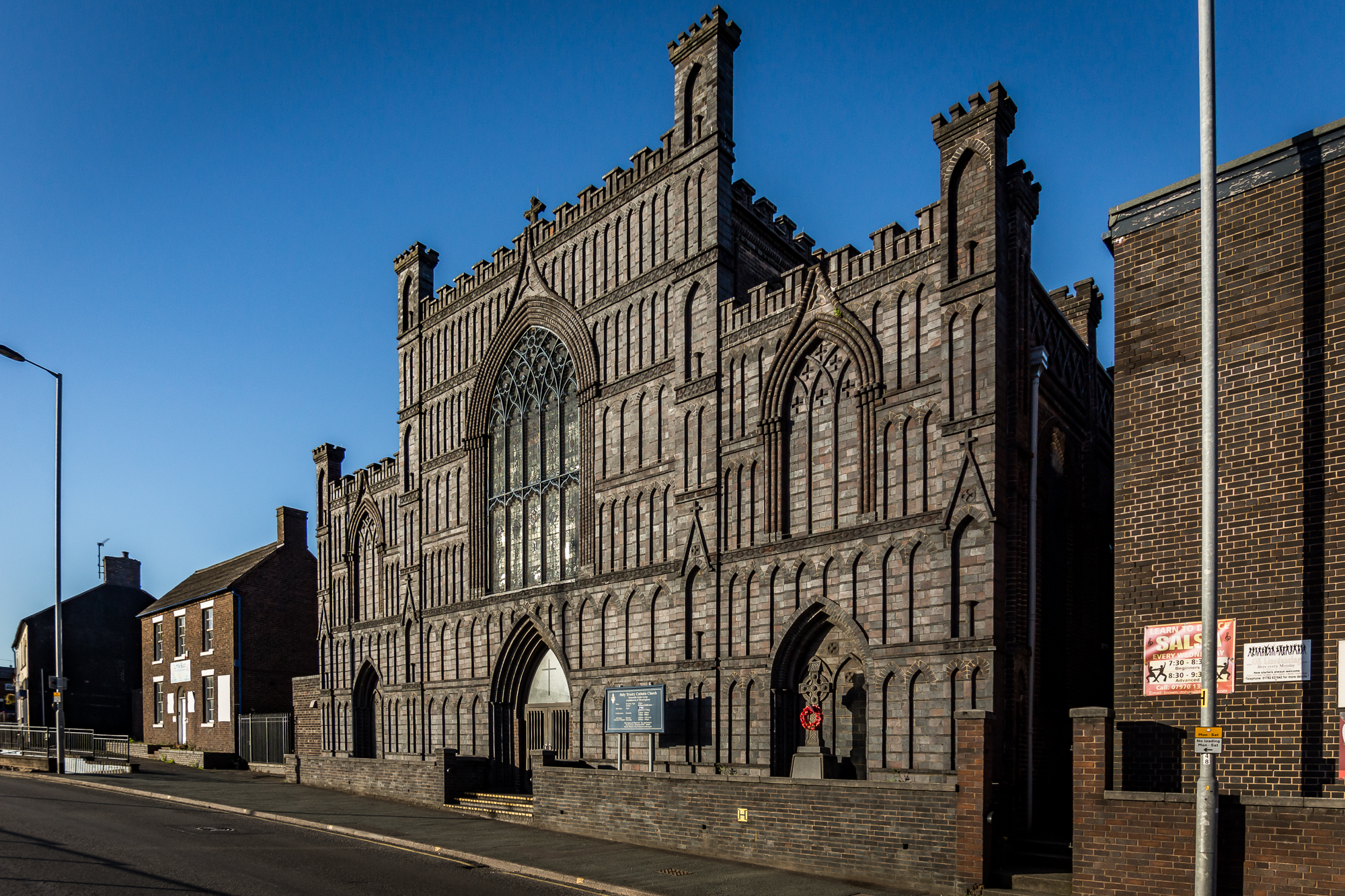
- Red Lion Square St Giles Church Guildhall Lyme Valley Park Ironmarket Holy Trinity Church

- Location within Staffordshire
- Population: 75,082 (2021 census)
- OS grid reference: SJ848459
- District: Newcastle-under-Lyme
- Shire county: Staffordshire
- Region: West Midlands
- Country: England
- Sovereign state: United Kingdom
- Suburbs of the town: List: Apedale; Bradwell; Broad Meadow; Chesterton (Village); Crackley; Cross Heath; Dimsdale; Hartshill (part); Knutton; May Bank; Porthill; Seabridge; Silverdale (Village); Wolstanton
- Post town: NEWCASTLE
- Postcode district: ST5
- Dialling code: 01782
- Police: Staffordshire
- Fire: Staffordshire
- Ambulance: West Midlands
- UK Parliament: Newcastle-under-Lyme
- Website: https://www.newcastle-staffs.gov.uk/

Newcastle-under-Lyme is a market town and the administrative centre of the Borough of Newcastle-under-Lyme in Staffordshire, England. It is adjacent to the city of Stoke-on-Trent. At the 2021 census, the population was 75,082.

Newcastle grew up in the twelfth century around the castle which gave the town its name, and received its first charter in 1173. The town's early industries included millinery, silk weaving, and coal mining, but despite its proximity to the Potteries it did not develop a ceramics trade.

== Toponymy ==
The name "Newcastle" is derived from a mid-12th century motte and bailey that was built after King Stephen granted lands in the area to Ranulf de Gernon, Earl of Chester; the land was known for his support during the civil war known as The Anarchy.

The element Lyme is found throughout the locality, such as in Lyme Brook and the Forest of Lyme. This ultimately derives from a Brythonic word related to the modern Welsh "llwyf", meaning elm. Elm trees covered an extensive area across the present day counties of Cheshire, Staffordshire and parts of Derbyshire.

== History ==
=== 12th–19th centuries ===
Newcastle was not recorded in the 1086 Domesday Book, as it grew up around a 12th-century castle built during the 1140s, but it must have gained rapid importance, as a charter, known solely through a reference in another charter to Preston, was given to the town by Henry II in 1173. The new castle superseded an older fortress at Chesterton, about 2 miles (3 km) to the north, whose ruins were visible up to the end of the 16th century.

In 1235 Henry III turned the town into a free borough, granting a guild merchant and other privileges. In 1251 he leased it under a fee farm grant to the burgesses. In 1265 Newcastle was granted by the Crown to Simon de Montfort and later to Edmund Crouchback, through whom it passed to Henry IV. In John Leland's time the castle had disappeared "save one great Toure".

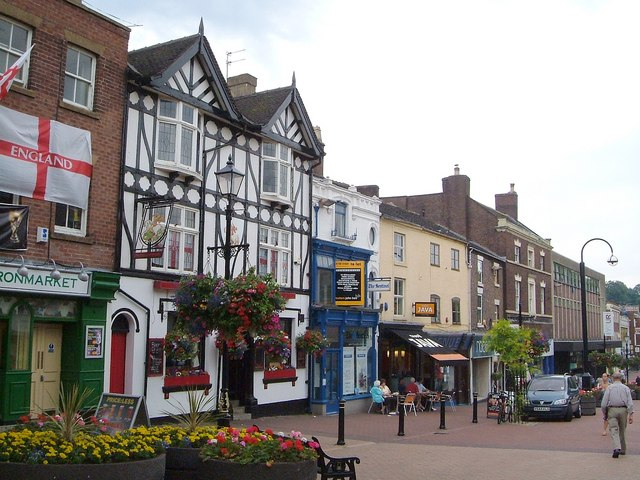
Ironmarket, Newcastle-Under-Lyme

Newcastle did not feature much in the English Civil War, except as a victim of Royalist plundering. However, it was the home town of Major General Thomas Harrison, a Cromwellian army officer and leader of the Fifth Monarchy Men.

Newcastle-under-Lyme, &c. Inclosure Act 1816
- Act of Parliament
- Parliament of the United Kingdom
- Long title: An Act for inclosing Lands in the Parishes of Newcastle-under-Lyme, Trentham, Woolstanton, and Stoke-upon-Trent, in the County of Stafford
- Citation: 56 Geo. 3. c. 33 Pr.

Dates
- Royal assent: 20 June 1816
Other legislation
Amended by	Newcastle-under-Lyme Burgesses' Lands Act 1859

Newcastle-under-Lyme Burgesses' Lands Act 1859
- Act of Parliament
- Parliament of the United Kingdom
- Long title: An Act to make better Provision for the Management and Application of the Newcastle-under-Lyme Burgesses Lands, to repeal and amend the Act relating thereto, and for other Purposes.
- Citation: 22 & 23 Vict. c. ciii

Dates
- Royal assent: 13 August 1859
Other legislation
Amends	Newcastle-under-Lyme, &c. Inclosure Act 1816

The Newcastle-under-Lyme, &c. Inclosure Act 1816 (56 Geo. 3. c. 33 Pr.) enclosed the common lands of the borough, and removed their common rights. They were thereafter held in trust for the burgesses of the borough. The Newcastle under Lyme Burgess Lands charity continues to exist, with entitlement to benefits going to those who would have been burgesses before the reforms of 1835: either the son of someone entitled to the trust, who was resident or occupying property within the borough's boundaries.

The Municipal Corporations Act 1835 reformed the borough, creating a new governing charter, repealing the previous charters of 1590 and 1664. The unreformed corporation prior to 1835 had been styled the "Mayor, Bailiffs and Burgesses of Newcastle-under-Lyme", but that act changed the style to "Mayor, Aldermen and Burgesses of Newcastle-under-Lyme".

In 1835, the admission of new burgesses was forbidden by section 13 of the Municipal Corporations Act 1835 under any criteria except that of being a ratepayer. This only affected the creation of borough burgesses, and not the entitlement rules of the Burgess Lands Trust, which continued on the historic burgess criteria.

Newcastle sent two members to Parliament from 1355 to 1885, then lost one of its seats.

Nelson Place and view up King Street, from a postcard, c. 1900

=== 20th century ===
When Stoke-on-Trent was formed by the 1910 amalgamation of the "six towns" (Stoke, Hanley, Fenton, Longton, Burslem and Tunstall), Newcastle remained separate.

Despite its close proximity, it was not directly involved in the pottery industry and it strongly opposed attempts to join the merger in 1930, with a postcard poll showing residents opposing the Stoke-on-Trent Extension Bill by a majority of 97.4 per cent. Although passed by the House of Commons, the bill was rejected by the House of Lords.

After the Local Government Act 1972, Newcastle became the principal settlement of the Borough of Newcastle-under-Lyme.

=== Utilities ===
==== Gas ====
Newcastle-under-Lyme Gas Act 1819
- Act of Parliament
- Parliament of the United Kingdom
- Long title: An Act to establish a Company for lighting the Borough of Newcastle under Lyme with Gas.
- Citation: 59 Geo. 3. c. cvii

Dates
- Royal assent: 21 June 1819
Other legislation
Repealed by	Newcastle-under-Lyme Gaslight Act 1855

Status: Repealed

Newcastle-under-Lyme Gaslight Act 1855
- Act of Parliament
- Parliament of the United Kingdom
- Long title: An Act to extend the limits of the Newcastle-under-Lyme Gaslight Company's Act for the Supply of Gas, and to authorize the raising of a further Sum of Money, and for other Purposes.
- Citation: 18 & 19 Vict. c. lxxvii

Dates
- Royal assent: 26 June 1855

Text of statute as originally enacted

The Newcastle-under-Lyme Gas Act 1819 (59 Geo. 3. c. cvii) established the Newcastle-under-Lyme Gas Light Company, who built a gasworks off Goose Street (53°00′28″N 2°13′35″W). The Newcastle-under-Lyme Gaslight Act 1855 (18 & 19 Vict. c. lxxvii) extended its area of supply beyond Newcastle-under-Lyme to supply gas to Trentham, Stoke-upon-Trent, Keele, Wolstanton, Silverdale, Knutton, Chatterley, and Chesterton. The company was bought by Newcastle-under-Lyme Corporation under the Newcastle-under-Lyme Corporation Act 1877 (40 & 41 Vict. c. clxxii). The council operated the gasworks until it became part of the West Midlands Gas Board under the Gas Act 1948. The site is now occupied by a Morrisons supermarket.

==== Electricity ====
Newcastle-under-Lyme Corporation was authorised to supply electricity by the Newcastle-under-Lyme Electric Supply Order 1899, confirmed by the Electric Lighting Orders Confirmation (No. 12) Act 1899 (62 & 63 Vict. c. cxxxvii). A power station (53°00′29″N 2°13′37″W) was built adjacent to the gasworks, and after 1910 supplies were also obtained from Stoke-on-Trent power station. The power station used diesel generators, supplying DC power. In 1921 it had a capacity of 650 kW. The electricity undertaking was acquired by the Midlands Electricity Board under the Electricity Act 1947. After nationalisation, the power station was only used for peak-loads in the winter, and it was decommissioned in the mid-1950s, before finally being demolished in the 1990s.

=== Economy ===
Like neighbouring Stoke-on-Trent, Newcastle's early economy was based around the hatting trade, silk and cotton mills. Later coal mining, brick manufacture, iron casting and engineering rose to prominence. Fine red earthenware and soft-paste porcelain tableware (the first such production in Staffordshire) was produced in Newcastle at Samuel Bell's factory in Lower Street in 1724–1754, when production ceased. Except for a failed enterprise in 1790–1797, which then switched to brewing, there was no further commercial production of pottery within the town. Production of earthenware tiles, however, continued at several locations in the borough. Manufacture of fine bone china was re-established in the borough in 1963 by Mayfair Pottery at Chesterton.

The manufacture in the borough of clay tobacco-smoking pipes started about 1637 and grew rapidly, until it was second only to hatting as an industry. Nationally, the town ranked with Chester, York and Hull as the four major pipe producers. The industry continued until the mid-19th century, when decline set in rapidly, so that by 1881 it had only one tobacco-pipe maker left.

In the 17th, 18th and 19th centuries, the town had a flourishing felt hat manufacturing industry, probably at its peak locally in the 1820s, when a third of the town's population were involved in over 20 factories, but by 1892 there was only one still in production.

In 1944, the Rolls-Royce Derwent engine for the Gloster Meteor fighter was made in the borough.

Newcastle's 20th-century industries include: iron-working, construction materials, clothing (especially military, police and transport uniforms), computers, publishing, electric motors and machinery.

Near the turn of the 20th and 21st centuries, the town received major redevelopment to incorporate a new street (Castle Walk) into the town centre, providing Newcastle with a new bus station and bringing in more companies. Various business centres in the town provide offices for companies that operate in the service sector.

The town was classed as a BID (business improvement district) in 2015, reiterated in 2021.

York Place Shopping Centre closed in February 2024, after its remaining in tenants moved out. Strip-out and partial demolition work began later that year as part of the site’s redevelopment.Contract Award for York Place (PDF) (Report). Newcastle-under-Lyme Borough Council. 12 November 2024.

=== Politicians ===
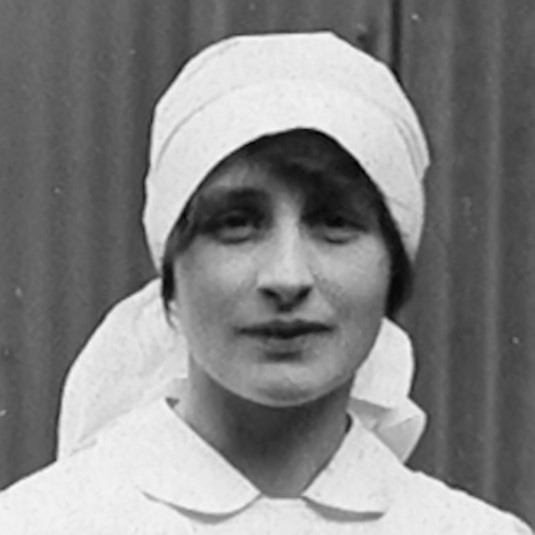
Vera Brittain

The town has been the birthplace of several notable politicians and activists. Fanny Deakin was a campaigner for better nourishment for babies and young children and better maternity care for mothers. The former chairwoman of Campaign for Nuclear Disarmament (CND), Janet Bloomfield (née Hood) is a peace and disarmament campaigner. Vera Brittain. writer, feminist (and mother of Labour Party Minister and later Liberal Democrat Shirley Williams) was born in the town.

There have been two particularly notable Members of Parliament (MPs). Josiah Wedgwood IV was a Liberal, Independent and Labour Party MP, who served as Chancellor of the Duchy of Lancaster in the cabinet of Ramsay MacDonald, in the first ever Labour government. He was an MP from 1909 to 1942. John Golding was elected a Labour MP for Newcastle-under-Lyme at a by-election in 1969. He served in the governments of Harold Wilson and Jim Callaghan, as PPS to Eric Varley as Minister of Technology, a Labour whip in opposition, and Minister for Employment, stepping down in 1986.

The current MP is Adam Jogee.

== Geography ==
Situated in a valley alongside the Lyme Brook, the town is just west of the city of Stoke-on-Trent, its suburbs running together. Newcastle town centre is less than 4 miles (6 km) from Stoke-on-Trent City Centre, about 17 miles (27 km) north of Stafford and 5 miles (8 km) south of the Cheshire county border and 10 miles (16 km) from the Shropshire county border.

=== Green belt ===
Newcastle and Stoke form the main urban area at the centre of the Stoke-on-Trent Green Belt, which is an environmental and planning area that regulates the rural space in Staffordshire, to prevent urban sprawl and minimise convergence with outlying settlements. First defined in 1967, most of the area extends into the wider borough, but some landscape features and places of interest within that are covered or surrounded. They include the Michelin Sports Facility, Newcastle golf course, Keele University, Apedale Winding Wheel, Watermills Chimney and Bignall Hill. The West Coast Main Line forms the western boundary of the green belt.

=== Environment ===
Newcastle-under-Lyme Borough Council undertakes a range of environmental, sustainability and regeneration projects. As part of its Sustainable Environment Strategy, it processes household and business waste through a 'waste to energy' plant and partnered with Advantage West Midlands in the development of Blue Planet Chatterley Valley, a sustainable logistics facility on the site of a former colliery completed in 2008. The Council also works with the Environment Agency, Walleys Quarry Ltd. and other relevant bodies to regulate Walleys Quarry landfill site in Silverdale.

== Demography ==
Comparative census information
2001 UK Census	Newcastle-under-Lyme	Borough	England
Total population	73,944	122,030	49,138,831
White	97.8%	98%	91%
Asian	0.6%	0.6%	4.6%
Black	0.2%	0.2%	2.3%
Christian	78.2%	78.5%	72%
Muslim	0.7%	0.5%	3.1%
Hindu	0.2%	0.2%	1.1%
No religion	14%	13.1%	15%
Unemployed	2.3%	2%	3.3%

Of the 73,944 residents recorded in the 2001 census, 51.7 per cent (38,210) were female and 48.3 per cent (35,734) male. Of these, 78.2 per cent (57,819) stated that their religion was Christian, and 12.9 per cent (9,570) said they had no religion. Islam, Judaism, Buddhism and Sikhism each covered less than 1 per cent of the population. Racially, 97.8 per cent of the population defined themselves as white, with the balance being mixed race – 0.6 per cent), Indian – 0.4 per cent, Pakistani – 0.2 per cent, black – 0.2 per cent, Chinese – 0.2 per cent, and other ethnic groups – 0.4 per cent.

In employment, 62.2 per cent (21,586) of the population work full-time and 19.4 per cent (6,746) part time. The largest employment types are manufacturing with 7,058 (21.5 per cent), wholesale and retail 6,157 (18.7 per cent), health and social work 4,097 (12.5 per cent) and finance, real estate and business activity 3,823 (11.6 per cent).

Jewish residency of the area stretches back into the 19th century. In 1873 the community purchased an old Welsh chapel to be used as a synagogue. In 1923 a new synagogue was built in Hanley. This was closed in 2004 and the congregation moved to a smaller synagogue in Newcastle.

== Transport ==
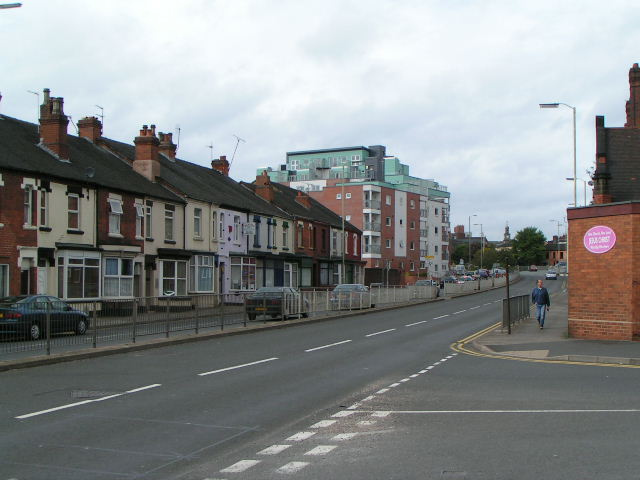
The A34 London Road

Newcastle-under-Lyme is served by the M6 motorway to the south and west of Newcastle and by the A500 road to the north and east. There are access points from the M6 at junctions 15 and 16, to the south and north respectively. The A34 trunk road runs through Newcastle from north to south and was the main road between Birmingham and Manchester until the M6 motorway opened. There is a large bus station in the town centre.

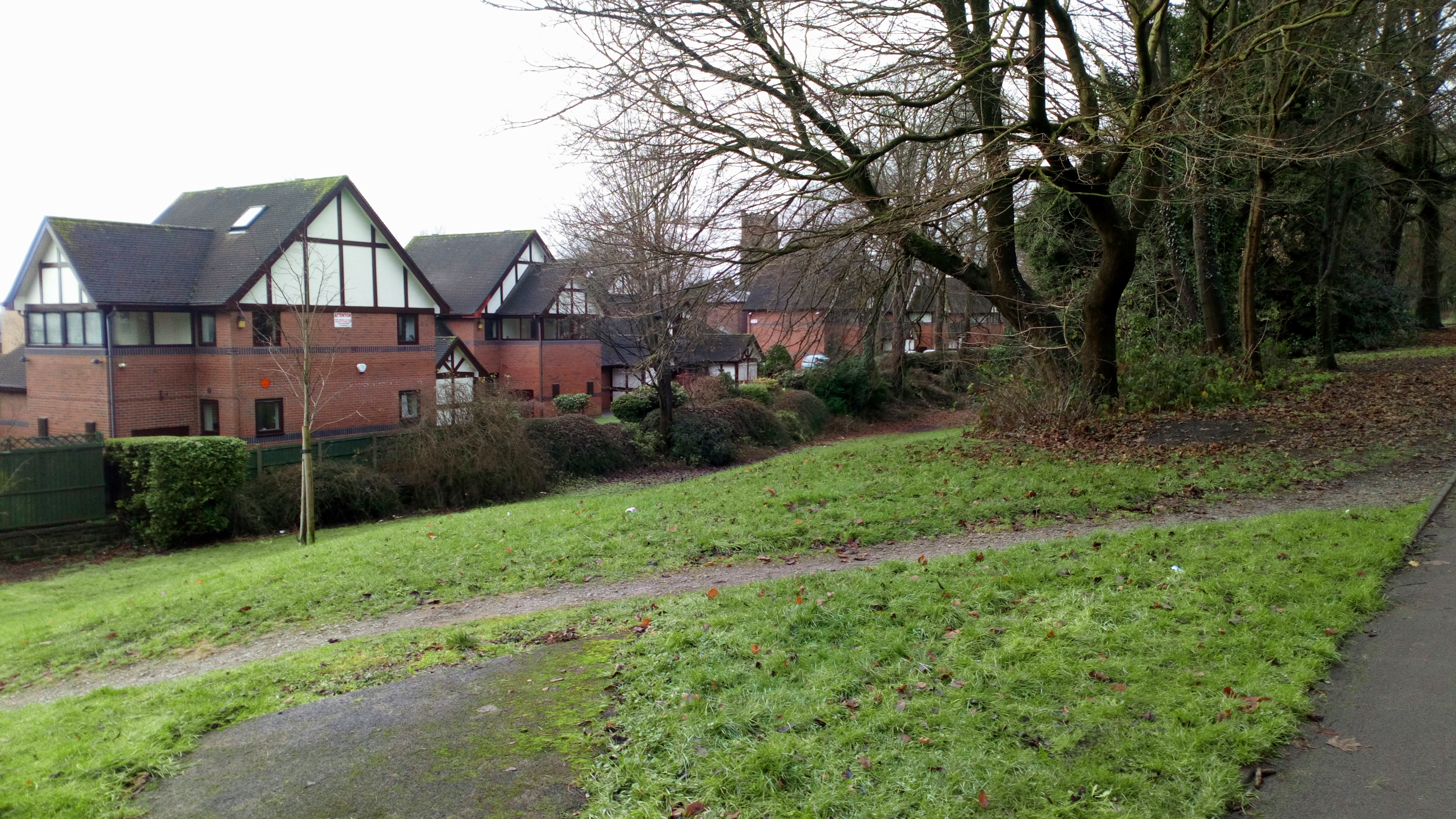
Newcastle-Under-Lyme station site, now Stations Walk.

Newcastle-under-Lyme railway station, which was not within the town but towards Water Street on the Stoke to Market Drayton Line, closed in 1964 under the Beeching cuts. The line from Silverdale to Pipe Gate remained open to serve Silverdale Colliery and a creamery at Pipe Gate until 1998, when the line closed to all stone and mineral traffic. It now forms part of a green way from Silverdale to Newcastle-under-Lyme, with the station site being called "Station Walks". The nearest station to the town is Stoke-on-Trent railway station which is between the town centre of Newcastle and city centre of Stoke-on-Trent and serves the Potteries as a whole. Newcastle is the third-largest town in England (by population) to have no railway station.

Most of the bus network is run by First Potteries and D&G Bus.

== Education ==
The town has a private school: Newcastle-under-Lyme School, which was established in the 17th century, whose alumni includes T. E. Hulme, John Wain and William Watkiss Lloyd. It has a number of primary and secondary schools in the state-funded sector. The latter include Newcastle Community Academy, Clayton Hall Academy, St John Fisher Catholic College, Sir Thomas Boughey Academy and The Orme Academy (formerly Wolstanton High School). There is a private Edenhurst Preparatory School, founded in 1961.

The town's largest sixth-form college is Newcastle-under-Lyme College, which was established in 1966.

Keele University main campus is situated 3 miles (5 km) from the centre of the town.

== Sites and attractions ==
=== Parks and gardens ===
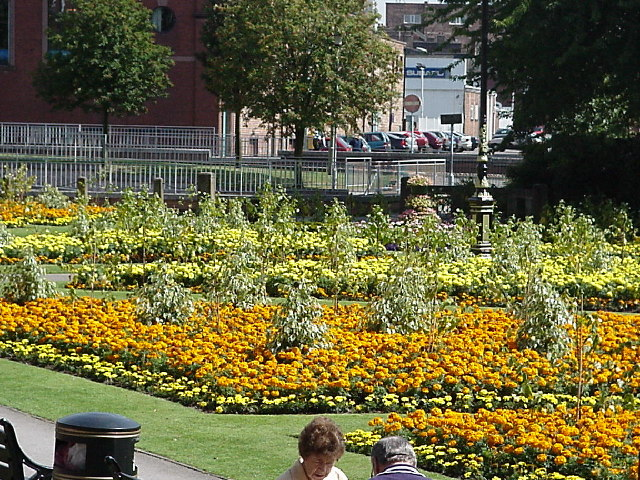
Queen's Gardens

In 2005 it was national winner in the "small city/large town" category (35K–100K). The town features several parks, including the Queen's Gardens at the east end of Ironmarket, which won the Britain in Bloom Judges' Award for Horticultural Excellence in 2003. Queens Gardens contains a statue of Queen Victoria funded by Sir Alfred Seale Haslam and unveiled by Grand Duke Michael Mikhailovich of Russia on 5 November 1903. It is the only park within the ring road.

Grosvenor Gardens is in the centre of one of the town's roundabouts, but hidden away below road level. Queen Elizabeth Garden is located outside the town centre and was due for refurbishment using National Lottery Heritage Fund money.

To the north-west of the town centre is Brampton Park, home to a museum and art gallery.

=== Traditional market ===
Dating back to 1173 Newcastle's market, known as the Stones, operates on the High Street. The market was originally held on Sunday; in the reign of John it was changed to Saturday; by the charter of Elizabeth it was fixed on Monday. Grants of fairs were given by Edward I, Edward III and Henry VI.

Today the market is open six days a week and has over 80 stalls. Mondays, Wednesdays, Fridays and Saturdays have a general market, Tuesdays an antiques market and Thursdays a sale of bric-a-brac. A cattle and livestock market was held on Mondays until the early 1990s; the site of it is now a branch of Morrison's supermarket.

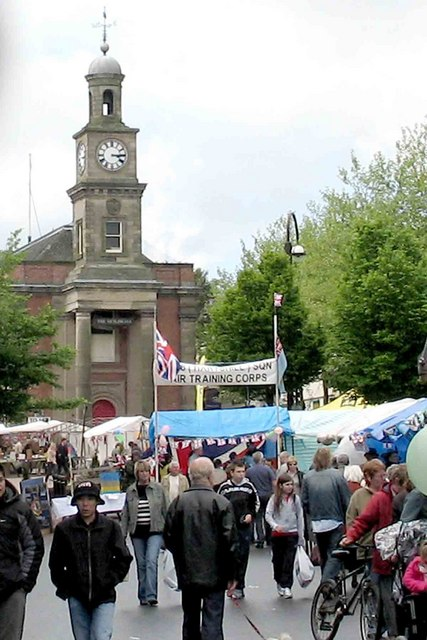
The Guildhall

=== The Guildhall ===
The current Guildhall was built in 1713 and has undergone a number of changes. Originally the ground floor was open and was used for markets, until the Market Hall was built in 1854. In 1860, to provide more space, the ground floor arches were bricked up and a clock tower with four clocks added. The top rooms in the Guildhall were used for meetings by the borough council. It is now a Grade II listed building.

=== The Barracks ===
The Italian-style Militia Barracks were built in 1855 of red brick. They were the headquarters of the King's Own (3rd Staffordshire) Rifle Militia until 1880. In 1882 W. H. Dalton bought the Barracks and settled them in trust for use by the Rifle Volunteers of Newcastle, which became the Territorial Force in 1907. In 2002 the barracks were let to small businesses.

== Culture ==
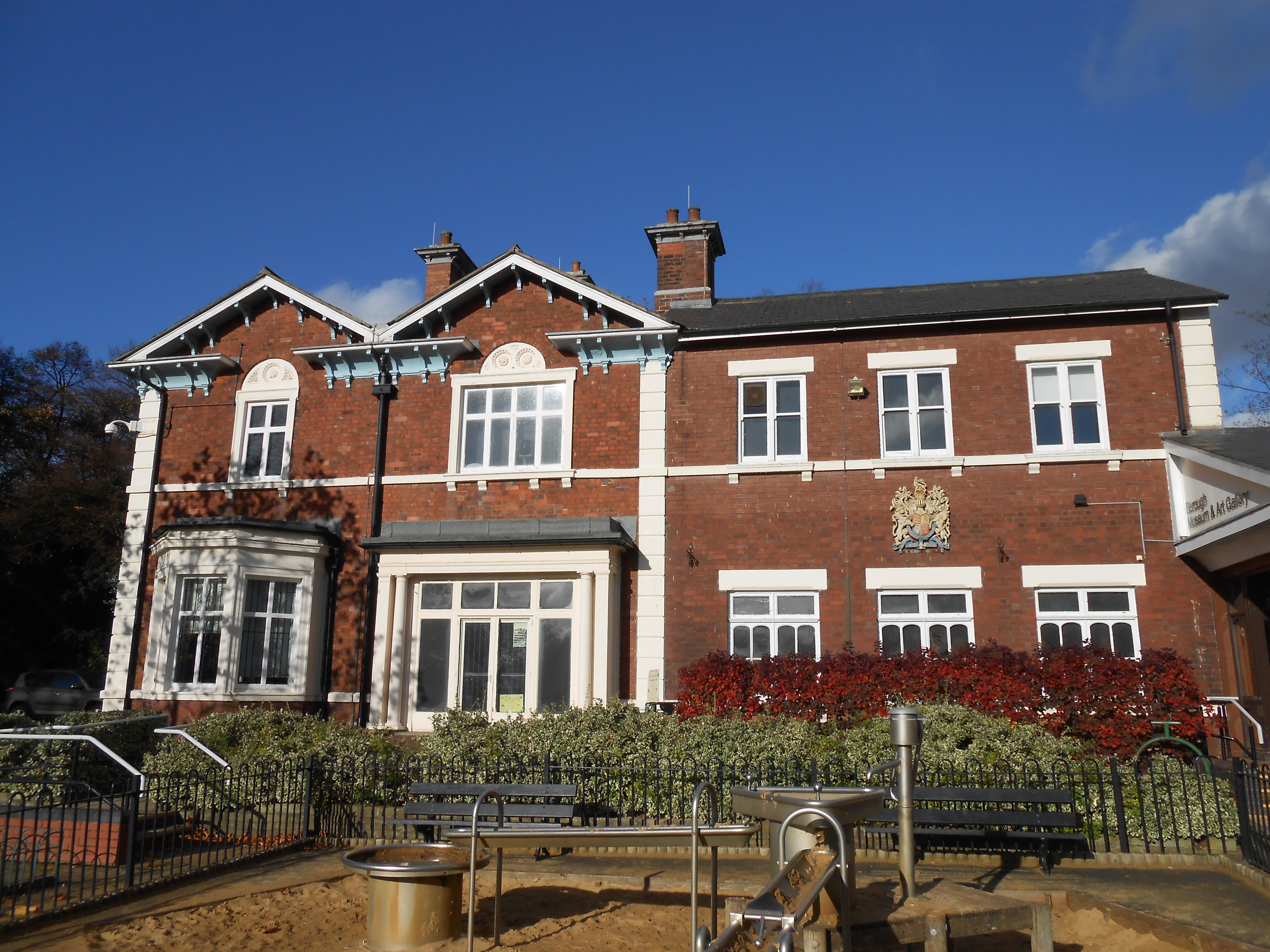
Newcastle-under-Lyme Museum & Art Gallery

The New Vic Theatre is a theatre in the round. Just outside the town centre, it offers a programme that includes modern and classic plays and concert performances.

The Borough Museum and Art Gallery (Brampton Museum) depicts the civic history of the Borough and an authentic, life-size Victorian street-scene. The art gallery hosts work by local and national artists, and travelling exhibitions.

Notable residents who contributed to the arts and entertainment include Philip Astley, founder of the modern circus. Jackie Trent, the singer and songwriter, was born in the town. Arnold Bennett, the novelist, playwright, and essayist, completed his schooling at the Middle School, and called the town Oldcastle in his Clayhanger trilogy of novels. Dinah Maria Mulock, who wrote under her married name of Mrs Craik, lived in the town (in Lower Street and Mount Pleasant) and attended Brampton House Academy.

E. S. Turner, social commentator, was educated in the town. Newcastle was home to Dr Philip Willoughby-Higson (1933–2012), poet, translator, historian, and author of 33 books. He founded and was president (1974–1992) of the Chester Poets, the oldest poetry group in the North-West. He was also President of the Baudelaire Society of France from 1992 to 2012 – the only Englishman ever to hold that position.

== Media ==
Regional local news and television programmes are BBC West Midlands and ITV Central. Television signals are received from either the Fenton or Sutton Coldfield transmitters. BBC North West and ITV Granada can also be received from the Winter Hill TV transmitter.

Local radio stations are BBC Radio Stoke, Hits Radio Staffordshire & Cheshire, a national station, Greatest Hits Radio Staffordshire & Cheshire, a national station, HitMix Radio, a community radio station for Newcastle-Under-Lyme, 6 Towns Radio, a community radio station for Stoke-on-Trent, and Blue Sky Radio.

The Sentinel is the town's local newspaper.

== Sport ==
The sports clubs and associations include Newcastle Town F.C., playing association football in the Northern Premier League Division One South East. Rugby is represented by Newcastle Staffs Rugby Union Club.

Cycle Staffordshire organises local cycling events, as does the Newcastle Track Cycling Association. The town has a velodrome used by the Lyme Racing Club.

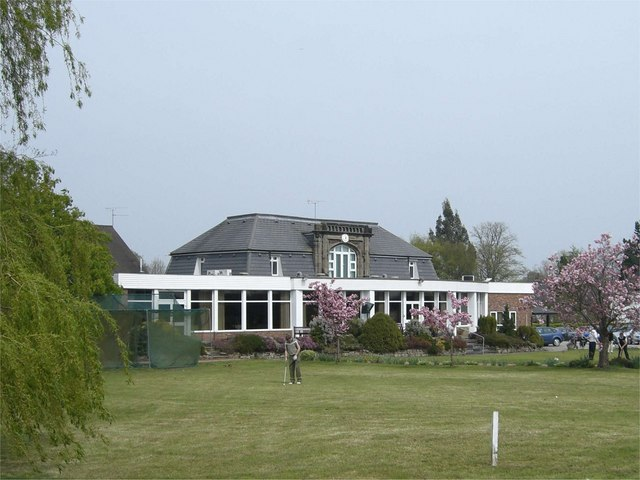
Newcastle Golf Club

Newcastle Athletic Club is based at the Ashfield Road track next to Newcastle College. This ash track was constructed in 1964. The club competes in the North Staffs XC League and the Local, National and Heart of England League 3.

The town is home to a volleyball club: Newcastle (Staffs) Volleyball Club. Founded in 1980, it has teams in the National Volleyball League.

Newcastle-under-Lyme College is home to Castle Korfball Club, one of the nation's older such clubs. This club was founded in June 1996 originally based at keele university

The town has a swimming club; Newcastle (Staffs) Swimming Club, which was founded in 1908.

There are golf courses at Kidsgrove, Wolstanton, Keele and Westlands.

Keele University is home to one of the UK's first quidditch teams, the Keele Squirrels. It hosted the first ever quidditch game in the UK in 2011 against the Leicester Thestrals.

== Religion ==
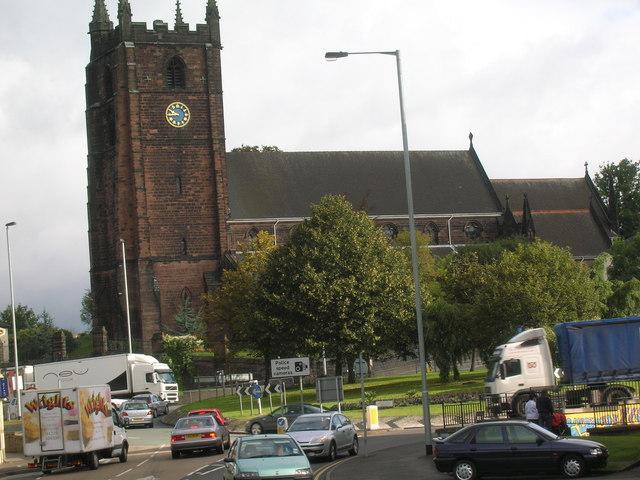
St Giles' Church, Newcastle-under-Lyme

The town was the birthplace of John James Blunt, a divine and Anglican priest. Josiah Wedgwood was a Unitarian and he and his family attended meetings at the Old Meeting House, adjacent to St Giles' Church, which is still in use for the purpose.

The town has a number of Anglican churches, including St Giles, a medieval parish church dating from 1290. There are several Catholic churches, notably Holy Trinity, whose style is Gothic in blue engineering bricks, described as "the finest modern specimen of ornamental brickwork in the kingdom" at the time.

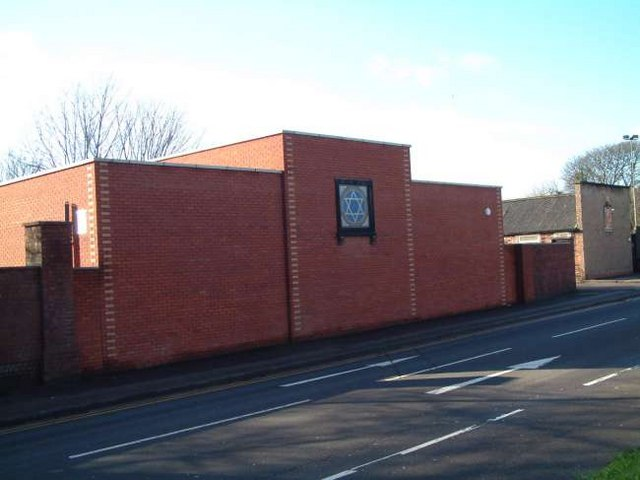
Jewish cemetery and Synagogue on the A34

In the 18th century John Wesley made repeated visits to the area, which was becoming industrialised, and recruited many residents to Methodism. This is reflected in a number of Methodist churches. There is a Baptist church in Clayton.

Of interest is the Church of Jesus Christ of Latter-day Saints (LDS Church), across from Brampton Park, which serves as the "Stake Centre" for the church in the region and has an on-site Family History Centre, where the public can research their ancestry at little or no charge.

Newcastle has a synagogue which replaced a larger one at nearby Stoke which was deconsecrated in 2006.

== International network ==
The town is part of a worldwide network of towns and cities with the name Newcastle.

This small international network of eight towns, formed in 1998, is designed to encourage friendship and cooperation between them. Accordingly, a school in the South African town benefited in 2004 from gifts of computing equipment surplus to Newcastle-under-Lyme's needs. The annual Newcastles of the World Summit was held in Newcastle-under-Lyme for six days from 17 June 2006.

- Neuburg an der Donau, Germany
- Neuchâtel, Switzerland
- Neufchâteau, France
- New Castle, Delaware, United States
- New Castle, Indiana, United States
- New Castle, Pennsylvania, United States
- Newcastle upon Tyne, England
- Newcastle, KwaZulu-Natal, South Africa
- Shinshiro, Japan

== Notable people ==
=== 17th and 18th centuries ===
- Humphrey Wollrich (1633–1707), Quaker writer
- Philip Astley (1742–1814), equestrian, inventor and father of the modern circus
- Silvester Harding (1745–1809), artist and publisher, who joined a company of strolling actors at age 14
- John James Blunt (1794–1855), Anglican priest who wrote studies of the early Church.

=== 19th century ===
- Henry Moseley (1801–1872), churchman, mathematician and scientist
- Joseph Mayer (1803–1886), goldsmith, antiquary and collector
- Emma Darwin (née Wedgwood) (1808–1896), granddaughter of Josiah Wedgwood and wife of Charles Darwin
- Sir Oliver Lodge (1851–1940), physicist, inventor and writer
- Arthur Howard Heath (1856–1930), industrialist, cricketer, Rugby Union international and local Conservative MP
- Sir Joseph Cook (1860 in Silverdale – 1947), worked in the local coalmines before emigrating in 1885; Prime Minister of Australia, 1913–1914
- Grand Duke Michael Mikhailovich of Russia, (1861–1929), lived in Keele Hall in 1900–1909.
- Arnold Bennett (1867–1931), writer, went to school in Newcastle
- Ada Nield Chew (1870–1945), suffragist and social activist
- Fanny Deakin (1883–1968), local politician born in Silverdale, campaigned for child nourishment and maternity care.
- Vera Brittain (1893–1970), author, reformer and pacifist, and mother of Shirley Williams
- Reginald Mitchell (1895–1937), designer of the Spitfire fighter plane
- Robert W. Tebbs (1875–1945), architectural photographer

=== 20th century ===
- Hortense Clews (1926-2006) member of the Belgian resistance in World War II, survivor of Ravensbrück concentration camp
- E. S. Turner (1909–2006), journalist and author, went to school in the town.
- Fred Kite (1921–1993), only Second World War British soldier to receive the Military Medal three times
- Colin Melbourne (1928–2009), ceramicist and sculptor of several statues in Stoke-on-Trent, was born in the town
- Freddie Garrity (1936–2006), singer, lived in the town near the end of his life.
- Jackie Trent (1940–2015), singer, songwriter and actress
- Neil Baldwin (born 1946), clown, Stoke City kit-man and honorary graduate of Keele University
- Kevin John Dunn (1950–2008), twelfth Roman Catholic Bishop of Hexham and Newcastle
- Professor Alan Sinclair (born 1952), clinical scientist and diabetes specialist
- Janet Bloomfield (1953–2007), peace and disarmament campaigner.
- Fran Unsworth (born 1957), journalist, head of BBC News since January 2018
- Andrew Van Buren (living), illusionist, showman, co-founder of the Philip Astley Project
- Hugh Dancy, (born 1975), actor played Will Graham in Hannibal (TV series)
- Charlotte Salt, (born 1985), actress as Sam Nicholls in Casualty (TV series)
- Dan Croll (born 1991), singer-songwriter.
- John Wain (1925-1994), author, playwright, poet, critic, biographer. Professor of Poetry at Oxford University.

=== Politics ===
- Robert Needham, 2nd Viscount Kilmorey (1587/88–1653), supporter of Charles I; MP for Newcastle-under-Lyme in the Addled Parliament in 1614.
- Sir Richard Leveson (1598–1661), MP for Newcastle in the Long Parliament, rebuilt Trentham Hall 1630-1638
- Samuel Terrick (1602–1675), local politician. In 1658 he went bankrupt for £20,000.
- Major-General Thomas Harrison (1606–1660) sided with Parliament in the English Civil War. In 1649 he signed the death warrant of Charles I and in 1660, after the Restoration, was found guilty of regicide and hanged, drawn and quartered.
- Sir Alfred Seale Haslam (1844–1927) engineer, three times Mayor of Newcastle, MP for Newcastle, 1900–1906
- Josiah Wedgwood, 1st Baron Wedgwood (1872–1943), Josiah Wedgwood IV, great-great-grandson of Josiah Wedgwood and Liberal MP for Newcastle-under-Lyme, 1906–1919, then its Labour MP, 1919–1942
- Sir Oswald Mosley (1896–1980), founder of British Union of Fascists, lived in Apedale Hall in early 1900s
- Stephen Swingler (1915–1969) Labour MP for Stafford, 1945–1950, and for Newcastle-under-Lyme 1951–1969
- John Golding (1931–1999), Labour MP for Newcastle-under-Lyme 1969–1986
- Llin Golding, Baroness Golding (born 1933), Labour MP for Newcastle-under-Lyme 1986–2001
- Jeremy Lefroy (born 1959) Westlands councillor, MP for Stafford 2010–2019
- Paul Farrelly (born 1962), MP for Newcastle-under-Lyme 2001–2017, journalist
- Karen Bradley (born 1970), MP for Staffordshire Moorlands
- Aaron Bell (born 1980) politician, MP for Newcastle-under-Lyme 2019-2024

=== Sport ===
- Dick Ray (1876–1952) professional footballer and manager with Port Vale and Manchester City, 239 club caps
- Frederick Bailey (1919–1985), left-handed English cricketer
- Don Ratcliffe (1934–2014), footballer with Stoke City, 438 club caps
- Mike Pejic (born 1950), footballer with Stoke City and Everton, 360 club caps
- Ian Moores (1954–1998) footballer with Stoke City and Tottenham Hotspur, 359 club caps
- Robbie Earle (born 1965), footballer with Port Vale and Wimbledon, 578 club caps
- Graham Shaw (born 1967) footballer with Stoke City, 284 club caps, now a solicitor
- Dominic Cork, (born 1971) cricketer
- Simon Wakefield (born 1974), professional golfer
- Alan Richardson (born 1975), cricketer
- Lizzie Neave (born 1987), slalom canoeist in women's kayak, competed in 2012 Summer Olympics
- Oliver Sadler (born 1987), first-class cricketer
- Peter Wilshaw (born 1987), cricketer
- Eddie Hall (born 1988), professional strongman
- Danielle Wyatt (born 1991), professional England cricketer
- Curtis Nelson (born 1993), footballer for Plymouth Argyle F.C., 387 club caps

== See also ==
- Listed buildings in Newcastle-under-Lyme
