= Clayton Wood Training Ground =

Stoke City's training ground and academy

Clayton Wood
- Interactive map of Clayton Wood
- Former names: Michelin Training Ground
- Location: Trent Vale, Stoke-on-Trent
- Coordinates: 52°58′54″N 2°12′32″W
- Owner: Stoke City
- Type: Sports facility

Construction
- Built: 2010
- Opened: 2010

Tenant
- Stoke City

Clayton Wood is the training ground and academy of EFL Championship club Stoke City.

== Development ==
In January 2009, Stoke City unveiled plans to redevelop their training ground at an initial cost of £5 million. Stoke City were given planning permission by the Stoke-on-Trent City Council to construct the facility in May 2009; Stoke had previously been renting the site from the Michelin Tyre company. The facility was designed by AFL architects who had previously designed Chelsea's Cobham Training Centre and Everton's Finch Farm. The centre was built in time for the start of the 2010–11 season.

In April 2012, Stoke announced £6 million expansions plans in order to meet the category one criteria in the Elite Player Performance Plan. In November 2015, further plans were announced to expand the facility. In summer of 2024 plans were unveiled for a £12 million improvement to Clayton Wood. The expansion works began in November 2024 and will included the construction of a new first team building. The construction of the new building was completed in February 2026 and includes recovery, rehabilitation, gymnasium, nutrition and sports science facilities along with a cryotherapy chamber and hydrotherapy pool.
