= Eagle House, Eccleshall =

Grade II listed Building in Eccleshall

Coordinates: 52°51′19″N 2°15′23″W

Eagle House
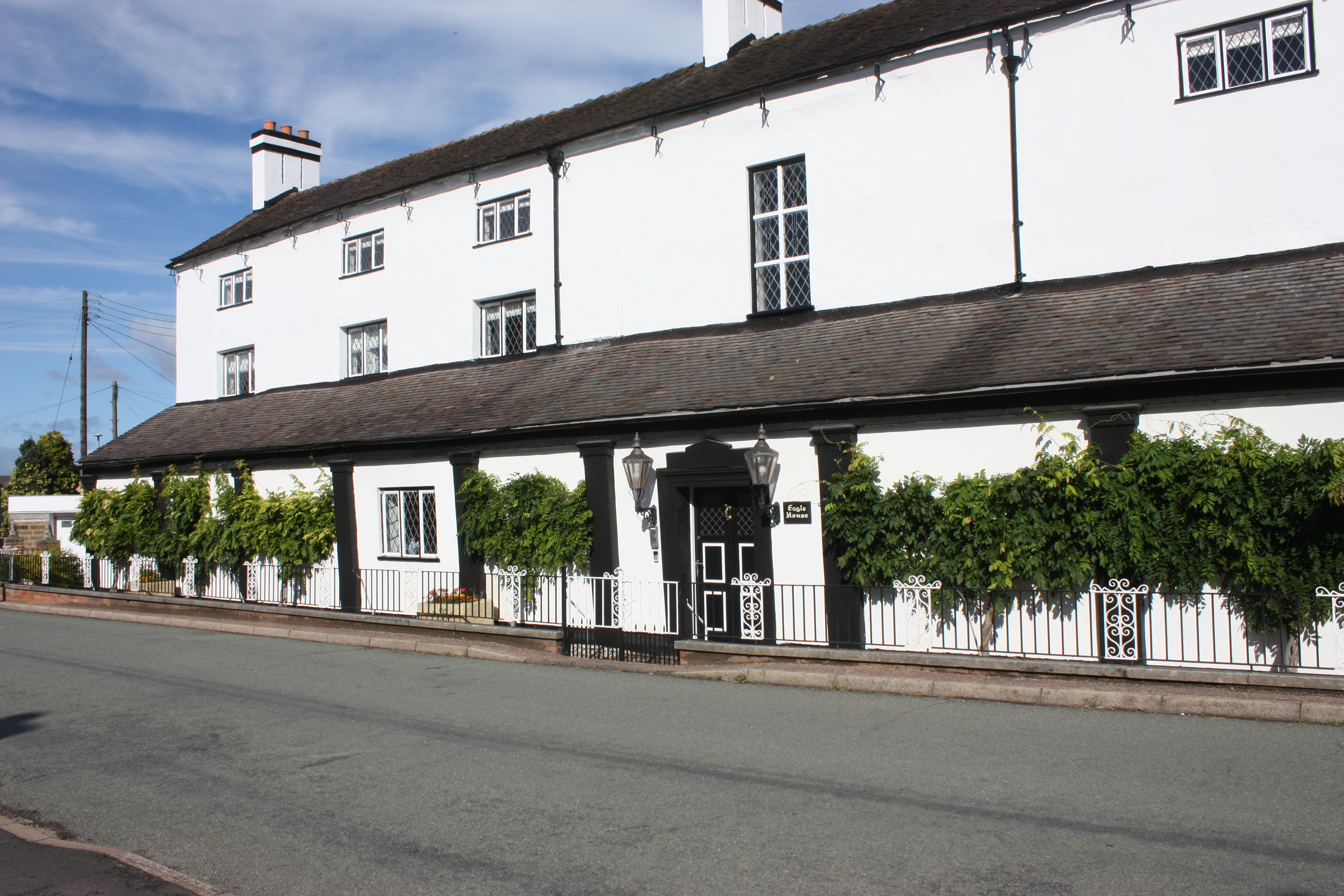
- The Front of Eagle House

General information
- Architectural style: Georgian Stuccoed brick
- Classification: Grade II Listed Building
- Location: Eagle House, Cross Butts, Eccleshall, Staffordshire ST21 6AX
- Construction started: 1810

Technical details
- Floor count: 3

Website
- Official website

Eagle House is a Grade II listed building in the Staffordshire town of Eccleshall, England, which is currently an award-winning bed and breakfast and Self catering Apartment.

== History ==
Eagle House was erected to replace the old Eccleshall Poorhouse (Workhouse) and was built using construction materials from the demolished local Town Hall. The construction of Eagle House began in 1810 after permission for its construction was given by James Cornwallis, 4th Earl Cornwallis, then Bishop of Lichfield, who lived at Eccleshall Castle and owned much of the surrounding land.

The first residents moved into Eccleshall's new Poor House in 1817. Reforms of the English Poor Laws meant that many of the nation's Work Houses merged and by 1840, all the former residents of Eagle House had been transferred to the workhouse in Stone, Staffordshire.

Shortly after Eagle House was closed as a Poor House it was sold to Eccleshall's surgeon, Dr. Christopher Greatrex. The Census of 1841 records Christopher living at Eagle House, with his wife Catharine and five of their seven children. Dr. Greatrex put Eagle House up for sale via auction in 1853. One of Christopher's children, Frederick Greatrex, who lived at Eagle House between c.1840 and c.1855 went on to become Mayor of Stafford in 1884 and 1896.

Following its sale in 1853 the building was used as a Girls' Boarding School, run by Head Mistress Sarah Tunnicliff. The school survived until at least 1894.

== Grade II listing ==
On 25 April 1980 Eagle house was listed under the Town and Country Planning Act 1990 for its special architectural significance. The building was given a Grade II listing due to its striking external appearance and original windows and shutters.

== Current use ==
In 2017, Eagle House was refurbished and is currently being used as a Luxury Bed and Breakfast and Self Catering Apartment.

=== Awards ===
In 2026, Eagle House won Gold for Regenerative Tourism at the Visit Staffordshire and Stoke-on-Trent Tourism awards.

In 2024, Eagle House won the B&B or Guest House of the Year Gold Award at the Enjoy Staffordshire Tourism and Good Food Awards. This award is in partnership with the Visit England Awards for excellence. Eagle House also won bronze awards in the Self-Catering Accommodation of the Year and Ethical, responsible & Sustainable Tourism categories at the 2024 awards.

In 2023, Eagle House won the Silver award at the Enjoy Staffordshire Tourism and Good Food Award category for B&B or Guest House of the Year.

== See also ==
- Listed buildings in Eccleshall
