= Daystate =

British manufacturer of air rifles

- Company type: Private Limited
- Industry: Sporting, Hunting
- Founded: 1978
- Headquarters: Eccleshall, Staffordshire
- Key people: Mauro Marocchi, Gianbattista Sabatti, Rachel Eyre
- Products: Air rifle
- Website: www.daystate.com

Daystate is a British manufacturer of air rifles based in Eccleshall, Staffordshire.

== History ==
The enterprise was founded in 1978 by Don Lowndes, Jim Phillips, Ken Gibbon and Mike Seddon with the aim of making tranquillizer guns for pest control purposes. The first product was the Air Ranger.

In 1980, Daystate was commissioned by Rentokil to manufacture a small bore rifle for pest control, this model was named the Huntsman and is in manufacture until today.

In the mid-1980s, Daystate was building PCP air rifles for the general public, at this time all rifles were built by hand.

== Product lines ==
Daystate currently produce 9 core products with various options in terms of caliber, stock and finish.

=== Current Models ===
- Black Wolf
- Wolverine R
- Huntsman Revere
- Alpha Wolf
- Red Wolf
- Delta Wolf

=== Past Models ===
- CR-94
- CR-97 and SE
- CR-X SE and ST
- Harrier and SE
- Harrier X
- LR90
- Merlyn
- MK4
- MK3
- PH6
- Wolverine
- Wolverine 2
- Pulsar
- Renegade
- Saxon
- Tsar
- X2
- Mirage
- Grand Prix
- 2000
- QC
- Huntsman Regal
- Huntsman FTR
- Competa target pistol
- Airwolf CDT
- Airwolf MCT
- Air Ranger
