= William Overton (bishop) =

English bishop

William Overton (c. 1525– 9 April 1609) was an English bishop.

== Life ==
He was born in Clerkenwell, Middlesex, England.

He became a Fellow of Magdalen College, Oxford, in 1551, and rector of Balcombe (Sussex) and vicar of Eccleshall (Staffordshire) in 1553. He was also made a prebendary at Chichester, Winchester, and Salisbury. He became Bishop of Lichfield and Coventry in 1580, and remained in post until his death in 1609.

=== Glassmaking ===
He was responsible for developing glassmaking in Staffordshire, importing artisans of French origin and supplying firewood from the episcopal estates. The glassworks he established near Eccleshall continued in production after his death, but were affected by legislation which forbade the use of wood for the furnace.

=== Personal life ===
His first wife was Margaret Barlow (1533 - 1601), daughter of Bishop William Barlow and Agatha (Wellesbourne) Barlow, and they had Susan (Overton) Playsted and Valentine Overton (1565 - 1646).

== Legacy ==
While he was still alive, he made arrangements for his tomb which survives. It is in Holy Trinity Church in Eccleshall, a small town where the bishops had a residence, Eccleshall Castle.

Overton was interested in increasing the income of his diocese, which had been affected by the price revolution, but he had little success in improving the overall finances.

Church of England titles
| Preceded by Thomas Bentham | Bishop of Lichfield; 1580–1609 | Succeeded by George Abbot |
