= Walton Hall Academy =

Location
- Eccleshall, Staffordshire; United Kingdom
- Coordinates: 52.8513°N 2.2244°W

Information
- Former names: Walton Hall Community Special School
- School type: Special school; Academy
- Motto: Confidence, Competence, Independence
- Established: 1848
- Trust: Shaw Education Trust
- Department for Education URN: 140997 Tables
- Ofsted: Reports
- Principal: Julie Wood
- Staff: 75
- Gender: Mixed
- Age: 11 to 19

Walton Hall Academy (formerly Walton Hall Community Special School) is a mixed special school of approximately 150 pupils. The school is based in Eccleshall, Staffordshire. It is a Grade II listed building, and part of the Shaw Education Trust.

== History ==
Walton Hall was an Italian style 19th-century country house which was built in 1848 for Henry Killick (d 1874), who was High Sheriff of Staffordshire in 1862. It was later occupied by James Cadman DSC (1828-1947) a coal mining engineer, and brother of Baron Cadman who was High Sheriff in 1933 and Deputy Lieutenant.

The school has undergone significant renovations since it first opened. It was originally an all-girls school. The Cyril Jones Centre changed into the area for staff and students of Key Stage 4, which was originally in the same area as Key Stage 3. The science laboratory became the new Year 9 classroom in 2017. In October 2014 the school converted to academy status as part of the Shaw Education Trust. the school was then renamed Walton Hall Academy.

== See also ==
- Listed buildings in Eccleshall
