= Eccleshall =

Town in Staffordshire, England

Coordinates: 52.859°N 2.251°W

- Town and Civil Parish
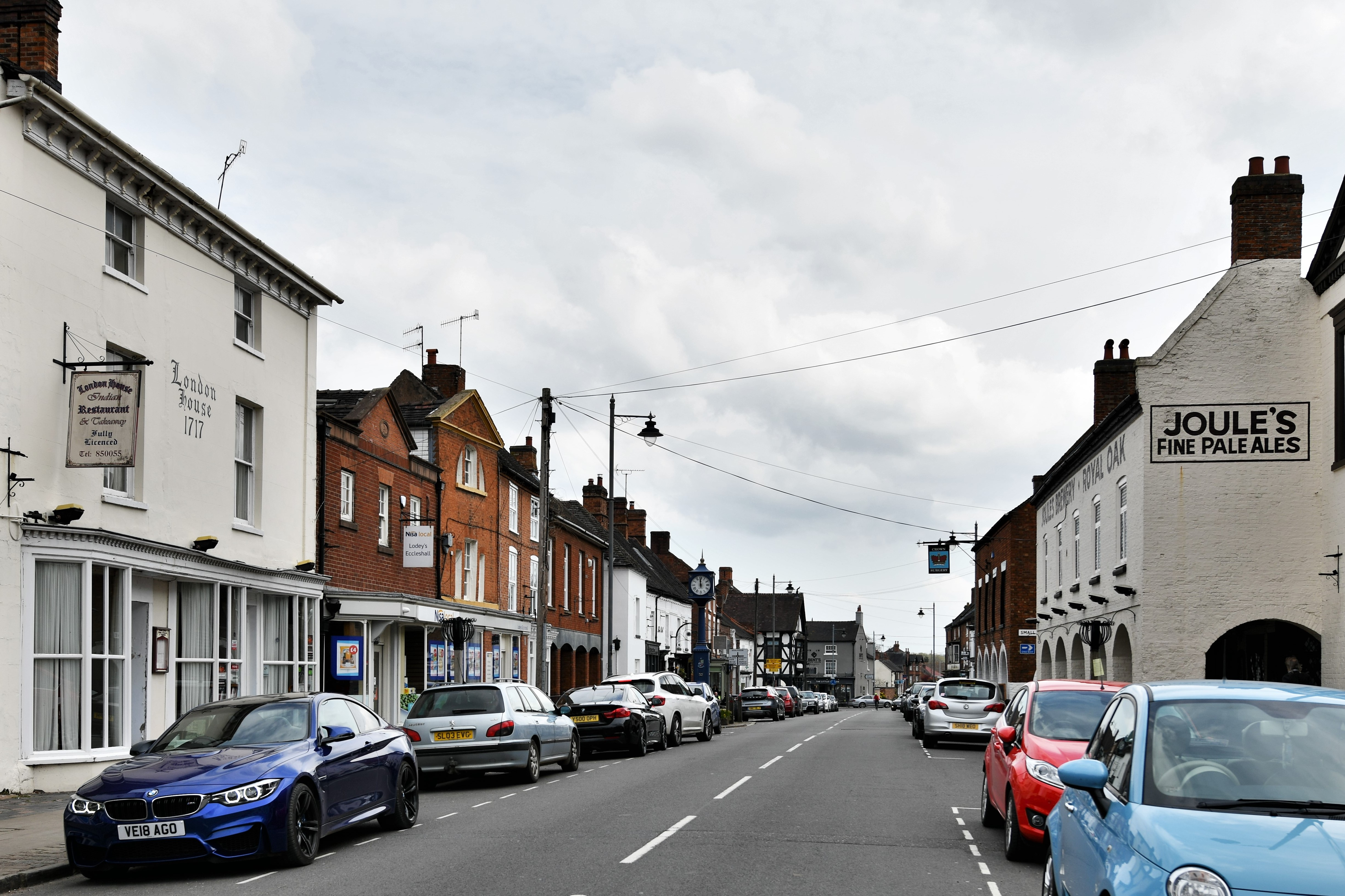
- High Street

- Location within Staffordshire
- Population: 6,500 (2022)
- OS grid reference: SJ832291
- District: Stafford
- Shire county: Staffordshire
- Region: West Midlands
- Country: England
- Sovereign state: United Kingdom
- Post town: STAFFORD
- Postcode district: ST21
- Dialling code: 01785
- Police: Staffordshire
- Fire: Staffordshire
- Ambulance: West Midlands
- UK Parliament: Stafford

Eccleshall (/ɛkəlʃəl/) is a town and civil parish in the Stafford district, in the county of Staffordshire, England. It is located seven miles northwest of Stafford, and six miles west-southwest of Stone. Eccleshall is twinned with Sancerre in France.

== History ==
The name Eccleshall derives from a combination of the Primitive Welsh word eglẹ̄s meaning 'church' and the Old English halh meaning 'nook of land'.

According to the Domesday Book, Eccleshall in 1086 was no more than a small village of about one hundred inhabitants. A few fragments of stone at the base of the tower of the present Parish Church of Holy Trinity suggest that a stone church was in existence about this time and the base of a 10th-century cross still stands outside the church. The oldest part of the church, the pillars and arches of the nave, were begun in 1180 while the remainder of the church was completed during the 13th century, with a fine clerestory being added in the 15th century.

Eccleshall became important as a market town for the surrounding area. In 1153 it was granted the right to hold a weekly market. Around the beginning of the 13th century the village had become a town with the granting of ‘Borough’ status and by 1259 had obtained a charter to hold an annual fair at Ascensiontide. By the time of the survey of the bishop’s estates in 1298 about five hundred people lived in the village, mainly craftsmen or engaged in agriculture.

To the Bishop of Lichfield, Eccleshall was conveniently situated on the main road between the centres of the diocese in Chester, Lichfield and Coventry. Land was reputedly granted to St Chad and in 1200 Bishop Geoffrey de Muschamp was granted by King John a ‘licence to crenellate’ a castle. From then on until 1867 the site would provide a residence for the Bishops of Lichfield.

However the ruins which exist today are those a later castle built in 1305 by Bishop William Langton, a friend of King Edward I and later Chancellor of England. This was the great era of castle building and he built an imposing fortress with four corner towers and a wide moat. Eccleshall castle briefly played a part in the War of the Roses, when it was used as a base for the Lancastrian Queen Margaret of Anjou and her troops before and after her defeat at the Battle of Blore Heath in 1459.

Bishop William Overton (1580–1609) was probably responsible, in 1580, for bringing two glass making families from Lorraine, Tyzack and Henzey to Bishop's Wood near Eccleshall to set up glass production. Manufacturing ceased around 1615, however, the site of one glass furnace has been excavated in recent times and is preserved and can be seen in Bishop's Wood.

In June 1643 the castle was besieged by Sir William Brereton and his Parliamentary forces encamped around the church. Their guns caused considerable damage to the walls but the castle held out. When the Parliamentary forces finally took the castle on 30 August they found that the bishop (Robert Wright) had died of a heart attack during the siege and most of the defenders were either drunk or had gone into town drinking in the taverns. The castle was sacked but enough of the building remained to be used as a prison for Royalist gentry.

With the development of turnpike trusts in the 18th century as a method of financing road building and improvements, coach travel throughout England had become faster and more reliable. With its position on the main London to Chester road Eccleshall became an important stopping point for coaches on several different routes and the town prospered, the inns in particular. Until recently the large stables at the Royal Oak Hotel could be seen.

For three centuries leather working and shoemaking had been important domestic industries in Eccleshall, but by the end of the 19th century both had almost ceased, with the growth of the mechanised shoe factories in nearby Stafford.

The film I Know Where I'm Going!, Powell and Pressburger's classic romantic comedy made in 1945 highlights Eccleshall in the scene where Joan Webster (Wendy Hiller) meets up with her father in London, and he informs her that he had travelled all the way from Eccleshall to see her that evening.

== Community ==
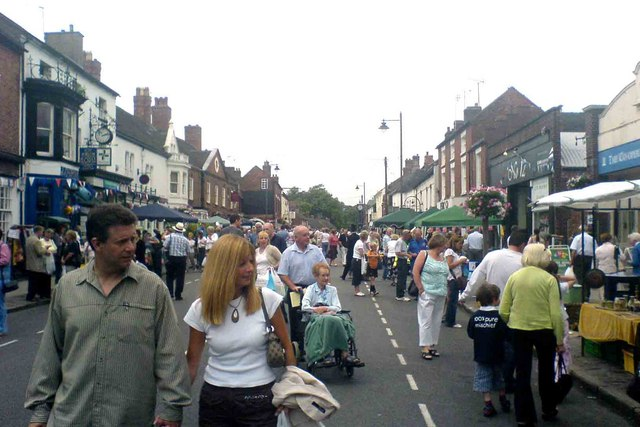
Eccleshall Street Market

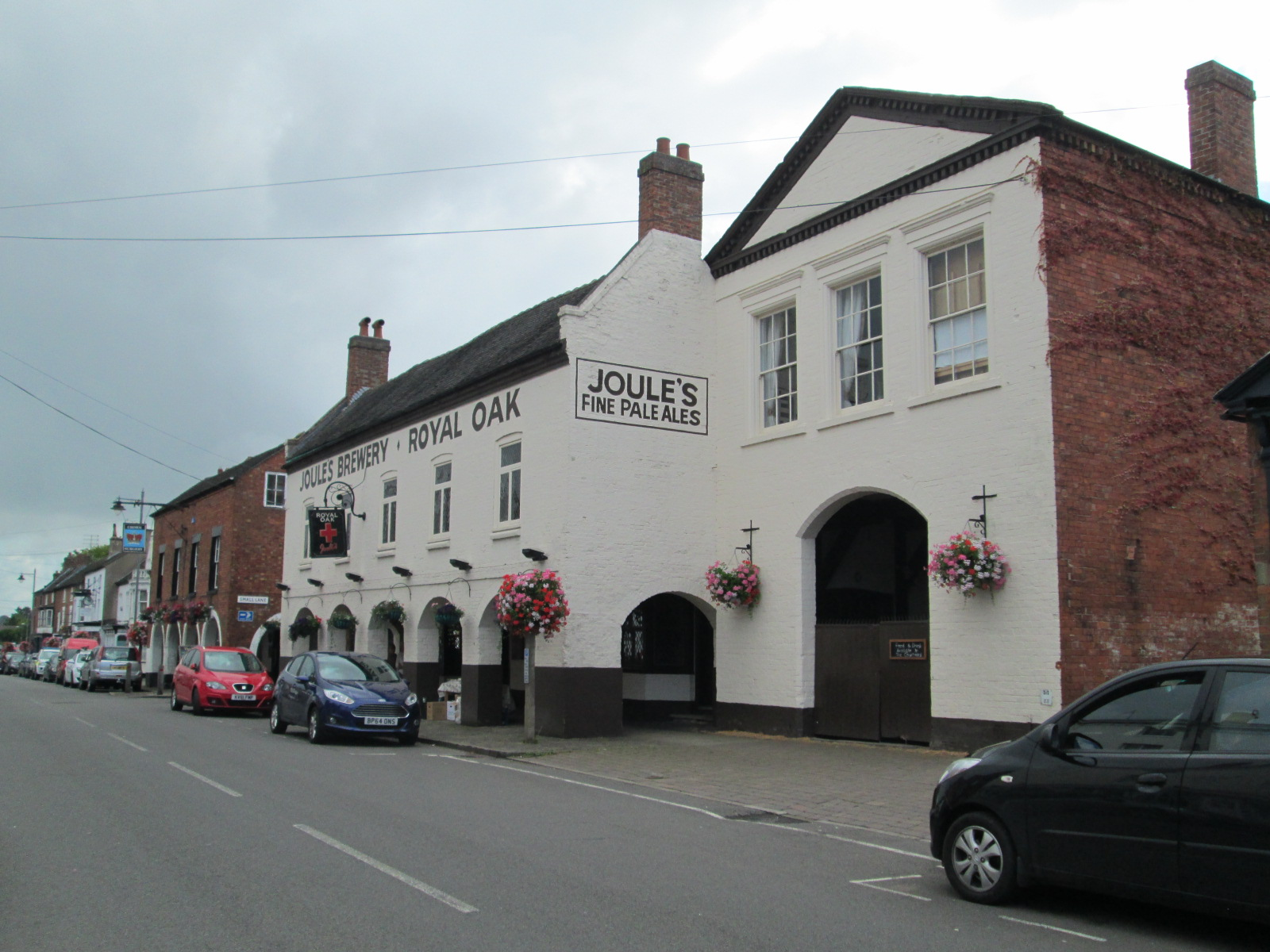
Eccleshall High Street

The high street has numerous shops, pubs, restaurants and businesses. A farmers' market is held every month and the town holds its major festival every two years. The Eccleshall Show is held every summer at Sugnall Parks.

Eccleshall High Street, with many Georgian and earlier buildings, is a conservation area. The town has been a regular winner in the Britain in Bloom competition and, in summer, the main parts of Eccleshall are bedecked with colourful floral baskets, organised by the town's civic group, the 'Ecclian Society'.

Eccleshall F.C. are an English non-league football club. They play in the North West Counties League Division One. The reserves play in the Staffordshire County Senior League Premier Division.

HM Prison Drake Hall is a women's closed prison. It is approximately a mile north of the town, near the village of Sturbridge.

Nearby Cold Meece houses a British Army training area that used to be a Royal Ordnance Factory, ROF Swynnerton. It is often used by the Air Training Corps and the Army Cadet Force.

== Media ==
Television in Eccleshall is served by BBC Midlands Today and ITV News Central.

Local radio stations are BBC Radio Stoke, Hits Radio Staffordshire & Cheshire, and Greatest Hits Radio Staffordshire & Cheshire.

The local newspapers are the Staffordshire Newsletter and Express and Star, who have offices in Stafford, and The Stone and Eccleshall Gazette which comes from Stone.

== Transport ==
The A519 road runs through the town. Junction 14 of the M6 motorway is five miles south of Eccleshall on the A5013.

The nearest railway station was Norton Bridge, three miles east, which formally closed in 2017. The nearest operational railway stations are Stafford and Stone.

Chaserider operate Monday to Saturday bus service 432 between Eccleshall and Stafford, with some journeys via Woodseaves. Select Bus operate Monday to Friday daytime service 103 to Stone.

== Places of interest ==
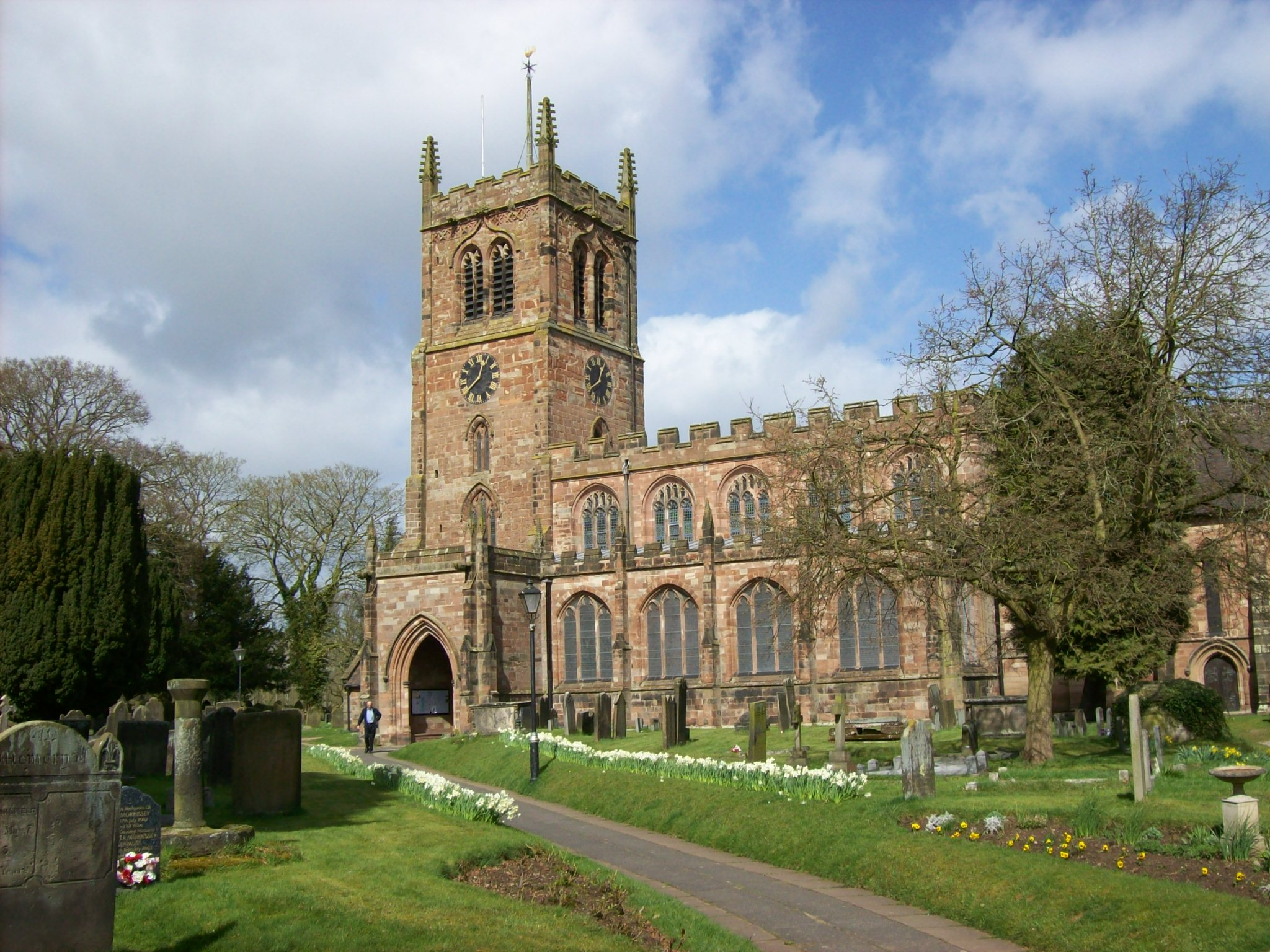
Holy Trinity Church, Eccleshall

Holy Trinity Church dates from 1195. The tombs of five Bishops of Lichfield lie in the church, that of William Overton beside the altar being particularly notable.

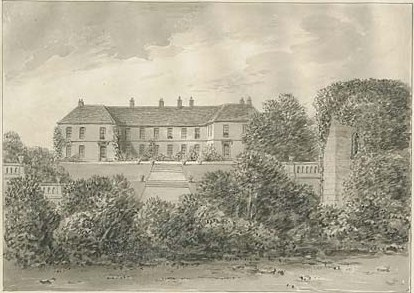
Eccleshall Castle

Eccleshall Castle was the palace of the Bishop of Lichfield. The Domesday Book details that the Eccleshall estate had been given to the Bishop of Lichfield some time before the Norman conquest, possibly as early as the 7th century. By the time Bishop John Lonsdale died in 1867 the lack of a railway was one of the main reasons that his successor Bishop Selwyn gave for the decision to sell the castle and thus sever the long association of Eccleshall with the Bishop of Lichfield. At the beginning of the last century the castle passed into the hands of the present owners, the Carter family (distant relations of former US President Jimmy Carter). The town itself was a relatively important market town by the time of the Wars of the Roses. In 1459, the castle was briefly a residence for the Queen, Margaret of Anjou, in her preparation for the Battle of Blore Heath, the site of which lies a few miles north of the town near Market Drayton. Later, the castle suffered damage during the English Civil War.

The restored Mill Meece Pumping Station is to the north of Eccleshall.

Eagle House, Eccleshall is a Grade II listed building in Eccleshall which is currently used as a Bed and Breakfast. Eagle House was originally erected to replace the old Eccleshall Poorhouse (Workhouse) and was built using construction materials from the demolished local Town Hall.

== Twin towns ==
Eccleshall is twinned with:

- Sancerre, France

== Industry ==
For three centuries leather working and shoemaking had been important domestic industries in Eccleshall, but by the end of the 19th century both had almost ceased, with the growth of the mechanised shoe factories in nearby Stafford. Glass production was important to the town in the 14th and 15th centuries.

Farming remains a major activity in the area.

Eccleshall has been the site for an operational biofuel power station since September 2007, fuelled by elephant grass, the majority of which is grown by local farmers within a 30-mile radius. The maximum capacity of 2.6MW makes Eccleshall one of the first carbon-neutral towns in the UK, according to the company that runs the plant.

== Notable people ==
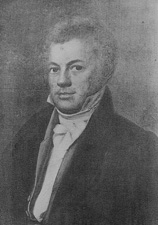
Charles E. Dudley, US Senator

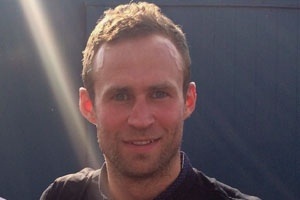
David Hibbert, 2014

- William Overton (c.1525–1609), an English bishop, he is buried in Holy Trinity Church, Eccleshall.
- Samuel Butler (1774-1839), Bishop of Lichfield, previously headmaster of Shrewsbury School, died at Eccleshall Castle.
- Charles E. Dudley (1780-1841), U.S. Senator from New York, Mayor of Albany, New York, member of the New York State Senate, born at Johnson Hall, Eccleshall.
- John Lonsdale (1788–1867), Bishop of Lichfield, died at Eccleshall Castle and buried in Eccleshall.

=== Sport ===
- Frederick Webster (1885 in Eccleshall — 1938), an English cricketer who played for Derbyshire in 1906.
- Anthony Hobson (born in Eccleshall 1965), a former English cricketer. Hobson was a right-handed batsman who bowled right-arm off break
- David Boden (born in Eccleshall 1970), a former English cricketer. Boden was a right-handed batsman who bowled right-arm medium-fast.
- David Hibbert (born Eccleshall 1986), a former football striker, played 281 games; now a coach at Stoke City F.C. Under-21s and Academy

== See also ==
- Listed buildings in Eccleshall
