= William Ward (bishop) =

The Right Reverend William Ward
- Bishop of Sodor and Man
- Diocese: Diocese of Sodor and Man
- In office: 1828–1838 (death)
- Predecessor: George Murray
- Successor: James Bowstead

Personal details
- Born: 19 September 1762 Saintfield, Ireland
- Died: 26 January 1838 (aged 75)
- Denomination: Anglican
- Spouse: Annie Hammersley (1805-1841)

William Ward (19 September 1762 – 26 January 1838) was an Anglican clergyman who served in the Church of England as the Bishop of Sodor and Man from 1828 to 1838.

Born in Saintfield, near Belfast on 19 September 1761, Ward was ordained in the Anglican ministry as a deacon in 1788 and a priest in 1789. In 1805, he married Anne Hammersley (died 1841), and they had two sons and five daughters.

Ward was nominated Bishop of Sodor and Man by King George IV on 3 January 1828 and received royal assent on 28 January 1828. He was consecrated on 9 March 1828 and enthroned on 27 October 1828.

Ward died in office on 26 January 1838, aged 75, and was buried in Great Horkesley, Essex.

Church of England titles
Preceded by George Murray	Bishop of Sodor and Man; 1828–1838	Succeeded by James Bowstead
