= Listed buildings in Eccleshall =

Eccleshall is a civil parish in the Borough of Stafford, Staffordshire, England. It contains 111 listed buildings that are recorded in the National Heritage List for England. Of these, three are listed at Grade I, the highest of the three grades, five are at Grade II*, the middle grade, and the others are at Grade II, the lowest grade. The parish includes the town of Eccleshall, villages including Croxton, and the surrounding area. In the parish are Eccleshall Castle, at one time the home of the Bishops of Lichfield, and the remains of an earlier castle around the site of the house, Holy Trinity Church, which contains the tombs of four bishops, other churches and associated structures, and timber framed houses and other buildings, including Broughton Hall. Most of the other listed buildings are houses and associated structures, cottages, shops, farmhouses and farm buildings, and the rest include public houses and a hotel, the remains of a windmill, a milestone, a holy well, a former police station, a former fire station, a drinking fountain, a war memorial, and a telephone kiosk.

== Key ==
Grade	Criteria
I	Buildings of exceptional interest, sometimes considered to be internationally important
II*	Particularly important buildings of more than special interest
II	Buildings of national importance and special interest

== Buildings ==
Name and location	Photograph	Date	Notes	Grade
Holy Trinity Church; 52.85988°N 2.25760°W		13th century	The church was restored, altered and extended in 1866–69 by G. E. Street. It is in stone with a tile roof, and consists of a nave with a clerestory, north and south aisles, a south porch, a chancel with a north chapel, and a west tower. The tower has clock faces, a lozenge frieze, and an embattled parapet with crocketed pinnacles. Along the clerestory and the aisles are embattled parapets, the windows in the chancel are lancets, and the east window has five stepped lancets. Inside there are the tombs of four Bishops of Lichfield.	I
Bridge, Eccleshall Castle; 52.86309°N 2.25680°W	—	14th century (probable)	The bridge crosses the moat, and is in stone. It consists of two spans with pointed arches, and has a plain parapet.	II
Moat walls, Eccleshall Castle; 52.86315°N 2.25719°W	—	14th century (mainly)	The retaining walls lining the moat are in stone, and have since been restored.	II
Tower, Eccleshall Castle; 52.86352°N 2.25596°W	—	14th century (probable)	The tower is a surviving part of the medieval building. It is in stone with a nine-sided plan, it has been reduced to two storeys, and is without a roof. The tower contains small pointed-trefoiled window openings.	II*
Bromley Hall; 52.91017°N 2.33441°W	—	Late 16th century	The building has been altered, and in the 19th century it was extended. The older part is in stone, the extension is in brick, the roof is tiled, and it has coped gables with stone finials. There are two storeys and an irregular plan. The openings include mullioned windows, and doorways with four-centred arched heads.	II
Outbuildings, Bromley Hall; 52.91013°N 2.33648°W	—	Late 16th century	The outbuildings form two ranges on the west and north sides of the farmyard. They are in stone with tile roofs, and have stone coped gables with ball finials. The west range contains a gateway, and has one storey. In the north range are cowsheds and barns with a hay loft above, containing mullioned windows. At the east end is a frieze depicting a hunting scene, and ending in a cross-wing that has two doorways with cambered heads and mullioned windows.	II*
Blore Pipe Farmhouse; 52.87077°N 2.34303°W	—	Early 17th century	The farmhouse, which has since been altered, is in red brick with dentilled eaves and a tile roof. There are two storeys and three bays. On the front is a porch, and the windows are casements with transoms and cambered heads.	II
Garden wall, Bromley Hall; 52.91057°N 2.33543°W	—	Early 17th century (probable)	The wall enclosing the garden is in coursed rubble with stone copings.	II
Byanna; 52.86542°N 2.25216°W	—	Early 17th century (probable)	A farmhouse that was refashioned in the 19th century, it is in red brick with stone dressings, and has bands of blue brick simulating timber framing, sprocket eaves and a slate roof. There are two storeys and an attic. On the front are two projecting gabled bays containing mullioned and transomed windows, and a single-storey bay to the left. To the right is a gabled porch with a four-centred arched doorway, and a single-storey wing beyond.	II
Wetwood Manor; 52.89354°N 2.33987°W		Early 17th century	The house has since been altered. It is in red brick with some stone, and has dentilled eaves and a tile roof. There are two storeys, a main range of three bays, and a projecting gabled cross-wing at each end, the right wing having applied timber framing and plaster. The windows are casements with mullions.	II
St Peter's Church, Broughton; 52.90035°N 2.34919°W		1630–34	The church is in a simplified Gothic style, and is built in stone. It consists of a nave with a clerestory, north and south aisles, a south porch, a chancel, and a west tower. The tower has an embattled parapet and eight crocketed pinnacles. Inside the church are high box pews.	I
Green Farmhouse; 52.90654°N 2.30457°W	—	c. 1635	The farmhouse has a timber framed core, an engraved cement exterior, and a tile roof. There are two storeys and an attic, and a gabled bay on the left. On the front is a gabled porch and two canted bay windows. The other windows are a mix of sash and casement windows. Inside, there is much exposed timber framing.	II
Broughton Hall; 52.90201°N 2.34832°W	—	1637	The house was considerably extended between 1926 and 1939. The original part is in timber framing and stone, the later part is in stone, and the roof is tiled. There are three storeys, and the top storey, which contains a long gallery, is jettied on grotesque corbels. The gable ends have decorative bargeboards, a moulded cornice, and a balustrade. The doorway has coupled pilasters, a decorative cornice, and a fanlight, and the windows are mullioned and transomed. On the front are various carved motifs, including more grotesques.	I
Charnes Hall; 52.90145°N 2.32939°W	—	1650	The house, which was altered and extended later, is in Georgian style with Baroque elements. It is stuccoed with stone dressings on a moulded plinth, with rusticated quoin pilasters, a string course, and a slate roof. The original block has two storeys and an attic, and a front of nine bays, the middle bays projecting under a large segmental dentilled pediment. It contains a porch with paired Tuscan columns and a cornice hood. To the left is a two-storey wing added in 1720, and there is a later single storey wing with a loggia.	II*
25–29 Stone Road; 52.85986°N 2.24715°W	—	17th century	Three timber framed cottages with painted brick infill on a stone plinth with tile roofs. Nos. 25 and 27 have two storeys and an attic, and No. 29 has one storey and an attic. The windows are casements, and the doorways have hoods.	II
Baden Hall; 52.87943°N 2.22684°W	—	17th century	The house, which has a timber framed core, was refashioned in the 19th century. The ground floor is stuccoed with applied timber framing, above it is plastered, and it has a tile roof. There are two storeys and an attic, three bays, the right bay projecting and gabled, and a rear wing. The doorway has pilasters, a rectangular fanlight and a pediment, in the ground floor are three canted bay windows, and the upper floor contains casement windows. Inside, there is much exposed timber framing.	II
Barn End, Pershall; 52.86589°N 2.27366°W	—	17th century	The house, which was later extended, is in timber framing and painted brick, and has a tile roof. There are two storeys, and three bays, the right bay projecting and gabled. The windows are casements.	II
Black and White Cottage and The Cottage, Walton; 52.84838°N 2.21151°W	cemtre	17th century	A cottage, later divided into two, it is timber framed with painted brick infill and a tile roof. There is one storey and an attic, and four bays. On the front is a gabled porch, three small rectangular bay windows, and three gabled dormers.	II
Gate piers, Bromley Hall; 52.91022°N 2.33648°W	—	17th century	The pair of massive gate piers are in rusticated stone. They have a square plan, moulded cornice caps, and pineapple finials.	II
Gardeners Cottage, Charnes Hall; 52.90155°N 2.33078°W	—	17th century	The cottage has a timber framed core, the external walls are in red brick on a stone plinth, and it has dentilled eaves and a tile roof. There are three bays, and exposed timber framing on the south gable end.. The doorway has a moulded surround with pilasters, and the windows are casements. Inside, there is a timber framed partition.	II
Hill Crest; 52.84371°N 2.25812°W	—	17th century or earlier	A timber framed house that was encased in brick in the 19th century. It has a tile roof, two storeys, and three bays, the middle bay gabled and containing a datestone. There are two doorways, one with a gabled porch, the other with a gabled hood, and the windows are casements.	II
Kings Arms Inn; 52.85919°N 2.25126°W		17th century	The public house has two storeys, the lower storey in brick and the upper with applied timber framing, and the roof is tiled. There are four bays, the right bay gabled. In the ground floor are a projecting porch, a canted bay window, and two tripartite sash windows. The upper floor contains four small-paned casement windows, two with a gable above. To the right is a single-storey wing containing a semicircular-headed doorway, and a carriageway with a four-centred arch and a keystone, above are two circular windows, and at the rear is a two-storey wing.	II
Old Hall Farmhouse, Chatcull; 52.90761°N 2.30582°W	—	17th century (possible)	The farmhouse, which has been much altered, is in timber framing, stone and brick, and has a tile roof. There are two storeys and three bays. The windows are casements, and inside there is a blocked inglenook fireplace with a massive cambered beam above.	II
Park House; 52.88741°N 2.36369°W	—	17th century	Originally a shooting lodge, the building has since been used for other purposes. It has two storeys, the lower in stone, and the upper timber framed with brick infill, and the roof is tiled. There are two bays and a doorway with a porch.	II
Pershall Hall Farmhouse; 52.86620°N 2.27932°W	—	17th century or earlier	The farmhouse was altered and extended during the following centuries. It has a timber framed core with cruck construction, the exterior walls are in red brick, there is a dentilled eaves band, and the roof has blue tiles. The house has an L-shaped plan, with a main range of two storeys and three bays, a taller cross-wing to the east, and a single-storey, single-bay extension to the rear. The doorway has a segmental head, and the windows are casements, most with segmental heads. Inside, there are cruck trusses.	II
The Cottage, Offleybrook; 52.86696°N 2.32333°W	—	17th century	The cottage, which was altered later, has a timber framed core, with external walls in painted brick on a stone plinth, and tile roof. There is one storey and an attic, two bays, and a rear outbuilding that has been incorporated into the cottage. The doorway has moulded pilasters, and a gabled canopy on brackets. The windows are iron-framed casements, and there are two gabled dormers.	II
The Stores, Croxton; 52.88680°N 2.31763°W	—	17th century	The house, which has been altered and extended, is timber framed with brick infill and a tile roof. There are two storeys and five bays. On the front is a gabled porch, the windows are casements, and there are three eyebrow dormers. At the rear are modern extensions.	II
The Thatched Cottage, Kerry Lane; 52.85755°N 2.26543°W	—	17th century	Originally two cottages, later combined into one, it is timber framed with infill in painted brick and stone, and with a thatched roof. There is one storey and an attic. The windows are casements.	II
Barn, Whittington Farm; 52.89937°N 2.30773°W	—	17th century	The barn is timber framed with weatherboarding, the west gable end has been rebuilt in brick, and the roof is tiled. There are three bays, and the barn contains opposing wagon doorways.	II
Eccleshall Castle; 52.86337°N 2.25687°W		c. 1695	For many years the home of the Bishops of Lichfield, later a private house, it was mainly rebuilt by Bishop William Lloyd, incorporating 14th-century material from the earlier castle on the site, which has been damaged during the English Civil War. It is built in stone with string courses, a moulded eaves cornice, and hipped tile roofs. There are two storeys and an L-shaped plan, consisting of an east range of 13 bays with three-bay projecting wings at the ends, and a rear range of nine bays. In each wing is a doorway with moulded pilasters, a triglyph frieze, and a modillioned cornice, and the windows are sashes.	II*
London House, 28 High Street; 52.85974°N 2.25350°W		Late 17th or early 18th century	A house, later used for other purposes, it is in rendered brick, partly on a moulded plinth, with corner pilasters, bracketed eaves and a tile roof. There are three storeys, and attic and a cellar, a double depth plan, a front of two bays, and a later single-storey rear wing. In the ground floor are three shop windows and two doorways, all under a canopy. On the front are sash windows and at the rear are mullioned and transomed casement windows.	II
Lea Knowl; 52.85459°N 2.31773°W	—	Early 18th century	A red brick house on a stone plinth, it has quoins, a floor band, moulded stone eaves, and a tile roof with stone-coped gables. There are two storeys and an attic, two bays, and a later rear wing. The doorway has a moulded surround, and a plain lintel with a keyblock. There are two sash windows with plain lintels and keyblocks, and the other windows are casements.	II
Pershall House Farmhouse; 52.86616°N 2.27584°W	—	Early 18th century (probable)	A red brick farmhouse that has a hipped tile roof with coped gables, three storeys and three bays. The central doorway has a moulded surround and a rectangular fanlight. The windows are transomed casements, and have segmental heads.	II
Smithy Cottage; 52.89710°N 2.33805°W	—	Early 18th century (probable)	The house is in stone and brick, and has a tile roof. There are two storeys and two bays. The windows are casements, and there is a buttressed chimney on the west gable end.	II
Boathouse, Cop Mere; 52.86698°N 2.29582°W	—	c. 1735 (probable)	The boathouse, which was reconstructed in the 19th century, is in brick with a tile roof, and is in Gothic style. It consists of a small square pavilion an arched docking bay, and has a doorway and windows with ogee heads, a quatrefoil frieze, dentilled eaves, and an embattled parapet.	II
4 High Street; 52.85988°N 2.25178°W	—	18th century	A shop that was refronted in the 19th century, it is in red brick with a tile roof. There are three storeys and one bay. In the ground floor is a canted bay window and to the left is a doorway with pilasters, both under a moulded cornice. The upper floors contain sash windows in moulded stone architraves with sills on corbel brackets.	II
Bell Inn and 18 High Street; 52.85979°N 2.25288°W		18th century	Part of the building is used as a public house, and the other, No. 18 on the left, as a shop and house. The building is in brick, partly painted and partly plastered, with dentilled eaves and a tile roof. There are two storeys, and each part has four bays, the left bay projecting. On the front of the public house are two canted bay windows and a doorway with pilasters and an entablature. In No. 18 is a shop front, the windows in both parts are sashes, and between the two parts is an entry.	II
Kitchen Garden Gates, Broughton Hall; 52.90302°N 2.34894°W	—	18th century (probable)	The gates at the entrance to the kitchen garden are in wrought iron, they are elaborately detailed, and have an overthrow. The gates have been moved here from elsewhere.	II
Eagle House, Eccleshall, Crossbutts; 52.85522°N 2.25644°W	Front to Eagle house, Cross Butts, Eccleshall, Stafford	18th century	A house in stuccoed brick with a tile roof, three storeys, five bays and a two-storey rear wing. The ground floor projects under a lean-to roof, and contains pilasters, and a doorway with a pilastered surround and an entablature. The windows are casements. At the rear are French windows, sash windows, a moulded eaves cornice, and a parapet.	II
Churchyard wall, Holy Trinity Church; 52.85923°N 2.25779°W		18th century (probable)	The retaining wall extends along the south side of the churchyard. It is in stone, and has been restored.	II
Stafford House, 19 and 21 Stafford Street; 52.85893°N 2.25126°W	—	18th century	A house, partly used later for other purposes, it is in engraved stucco, with eaves on wood brackets. There are two storeys and five bays. In the centre is a projecting porch with square columns, moulded capitals, and a cornice hood. The doorway has a rectangular fanlight, to the left is a modern projecting shop front, and the windows are casements.	II
The Old Vicarage; 52.85880°N 2.25701°W	—	Mid 18th century	The vicarage, later divided into flats, is in red brick with rusticated side pilasters, and a tile roof with coped gables. There are two storeys and attics, five bays, and a later wing on the left. The doorway has a moulded surround, the windows are casements, there are three gabled dormers, and in the wing is a canted bay window tiered over two storeys.	II
Aspley House Farmhouse; 52.89537°N 2.27363°W	—	1759	A red brick farmhouse with rusticated quoins, a string course between the storeys, and a tile roof. There are two storeys and an attic, and three bays. On the front is a gabled porch, and the windows are casements with transoms and keyblocks.	II
Remains of Sugnall Old Hall; 52.87359°N 2.30230°W	—	c. 1772	The rest of the hall was demolished in the 1870s, leaving the kitchen wing. This is in stone with moulded eaves, and a tile roof, hipped on the west side. There is one storey and two bays. The building contains two window with keystones and a modern dormer, and there is a crow-stepped gable on the east side and a massive chimney stack.	II
3–9 High Street; 52.85971°N 2.25189°W	—	Late 18th century	A row of shops in red brick with dentilled eaves and a tile roof, and three storeys. No. 3 has two bays, a shop front with a dentilled cornice, and two canted oriel windows above. The other shops have been much altered and contain shop fronts with bow windows, and have casement windows above. To the left is an entry with a sash window above.	II
17–21 High Street; 52.85961°N 2.25262°W		Late 18th century	The house, partly used as shops, probably has an earlier core. It is in red brick with moulded eaves, and a tile roof with coped gables. There are two storeys and an attic, and five bays, the middle three bays projecting under a pediment containing a bull's eye window. In the centre is a doorway with a stuccoed surround and a cornice hood, to the left is a canted bay window, and to the right is a 19th-century shop front. The upper floor contains sash windows with projecting keystones.	II
29 High Street; 52.85951°N 2.25362°W		Late 18th century	A house, later used for other purposes, in red brick, with dentilled eaves and a tile roof. There are three storeys and three bays. Steps lead up to the doorway that has a pedimented hood, and the windows are sashes with moulded surrounds.	II
38 High Street; 52.85963°N 2.25424°W		Late 18th century	A shop and a house in red brick with moulded eaves, and a tile roof with coped gables. There are three storeys and four bays. In the ground floor is a 19th-century shop front on the right and a passageway on the left, and the windows are sashes with cambered heads.	II
39–43 High Street; 52.85946°N 2.25419°W	—	Late 18th century	The building is in roughcast brick with a tile roof, three storeys and three bays. In the ground floor is a restored shop window on the left, and on the right is a 19th-century shop front. The upper floors contain sash windows with moulded keyblocks, and at the rear are modern extensions.	II
46 and 48 High Street; 52.85961°N 2.25496°W		Late 18th century	A pair of red brick houses on a stone plinth, with moulded eaves and a tile roof. There are three storeys and nine bays, the middle three bays projecting slightly under a moulded pediment. In the left bay is a canted bay window tiered over two storeys, and to the right are two single-storey bay windows. To the left is a doorway with moulded pilasters, a radial fanlight, and a modillioned hood. The right doorway has a moulded cornice, a rectangular fanlight, and a hood carried on slender shafts. The windows are sashes with wedge lintels, and in the centre is a round-headed entry.	II
51–55 High Street; 52.85939°N 2.25480°W	—	Late 18th century	A row of three red brick houses on a stone plinth with a tile roof. There are three storeys, and each house has one bay. The doorways have moulded surrounds and pilasters, and the windows are sashes. Between Nos. 53 and 55 is an entry.	II
76 High Street; 52.85945°N 2.25657°W	—	Late 18th century	The house has a timber framed core dating from the late 16th or early 17th century. The exterior is in plastered brick on a stone plinth, there are plain pilasters with moulded caps at the ends and between the bays, a moulded cornice between the floors, and a tile roof. The house has two storeys and three bays, with a pediment over the middle bay. Steps lead up to the central doorway that has moulded pilasters and a pediment, and the windows are sashes.	II
78 High Street; 52.85939°N 2.25685°W	—	Late 18th century	A red brick house with a slate roof, three storeys and four bays. The doorway has moulded pilasters, a panelled soffit, and an open pediment, and the windows are sashes with plain lintels.	II
80 and 82 High Street; 52.85936°N 2.25718°W	—	Late 18th century	This consists of a house in painted brick with a tile roof and an outbuilding converted into a house. The house has two storeys and four bays. In the centre is a doorway with a moulded surround, a panelled soffit, and an open pediment, and the windows are sashes with cambered heads. The former outbuilding forms a rear wing to the west, and has three storeys.	II
Corner House, Sugnall; 52.87568°N 2.30160°W	—	Late 18th century	A house, later divided into three dwellings, it is in red brick, with a string course, dentilled eaves, and a tile roof. There are two storeys and attics, and three bays. On the front is a gabled porch and a doorway with a rectangular fanlight. The windows are casements, and there are three gabled dormers with bargeboards and finials.	II
House to west of Vernon Yonge Arms; 52.89114°N 2.32500°W	—	Late 18th century	The house is in stone with a tile roof, and has a projecting red brick wing to the right. There are two storeys, and a main range of two bays. The doorway has a moulded surround, the windows are casements with projecting keyblocks, and there is a later canted bay window to the right.	II
Remains of Windmill, Croxton; 52.88384°N 2.32552°W		Late 18th century (probable)	The former windmill is in brick, and consists of a tapering tower with a circular plan. The building contains a doorway with a flat arch and windows with stone surrounds.	II
Lodge, Johnson Hall; 52.84989°N 2.25460°W	—	c.1800	The lodge is stuccoed, and has projecting sprocket eaves and a slate roof. In the centre is a projecting two-storey gabled wing with a string course, a central round-headed doorway and flanking windows, and a three-light window above with round-headed lights. Flanking this are single-storey single-bay wings.	II
1 and 1A Castle Street; 52.85994°N 2.25129°W		Early 19th century	The building was extended to the right in the 19th century. The original part has a timber framed core, and the whole has a roughcast front, dentilled eaves, and a tile roof. There are three storeys and six bays. The earlier part has two canted bay windows, and a doorway with a stuccoed surround. The later part has a pub front, and to the left is a doorway with a segmental fanlight and an open pediment. The windows are sashes, and inside the earlier part is an exposed timber-framed partition.	II
2 and 4 Castle Street; 52.86000°N 2.25162°W	—	Early 19th century	A pair of red brick houses with a tile roof and two storeys. No. 2 has three bays, and No. 4 has one. The ground floor of No. 2 is flanked by pilasters, in the centre is a recessed porch with two columns, the doorway has a rectangular fanlight, there are two flanking windows, and over all is a moulded cornice carried on carved consoles. No. 4 has a shop front with the doorway on the right. The windows are casements.	II
9 Church Street; 52.85918°N 2.25834°W		Early 19th century	A red brick cottage at right angles to the street, with dentilled eaves and a tile roof. The doorway has pilasters, most of the windows are sashes, and in the gable end facing the street is a casement window.	II
23 Church Street; 52.85939°N 2.26039°W	—	Early 19th century	A red brick house with dentilled eaves and a tile roof. There are two storeys and two bays. In the centre is a doorway with a gabled porch, and the windows are sashes with wedge lintels.	II
1 High Street; 52.85973°N 2.25166°W	—	Early 19th century	A shop on a corner site, in red brick with a tile roof, three storeys and two bays. In the ground floor is a 19th-century shop front with a dentilled cornice, and in the upper floors are sash windows.	II
2 High Street; 52.85990°N 2.25165°W	—	Early 19th century	A shop and house on a corner site, with a front in engraved cement, dentilled eaves and a tile roof. There are three bays on High Street, and one on Castle Street; the right bay on High Street has three storeys, and the others have two. In the right bay is a canted bay window tiered over two storeys, in the middle bay is a canted shop window, and the left bay contains garage doors. The two doorways are plain, each with a rectangular fanlight, and in the upper floor are a mix of sash and casement windows.	II
8 High Street; 52.85990°N 2.25200°W		Early 19th century	A shop in painted brick with dentilled eaves and a tile roof. There are two storeys and two bays. In the left bay is a shop front with a doorway to the right, and in the right bay is another doorway and a fixed window. The upper floor contains sash windows with plain lintels and keyblocks.	II
11 High Street; 52.85967°N 2.25214°W	—	Early 19th century	A shop in engraved stucco with a tile roof, it has three storeys and three bays. In the left bay is a canted bay window, tiered over two storeys, with a parapet in ornamental wrought iron. To the right is a modern shop front, and the windows are sashes.	II
24 High Street; 52.85974°N 2.25323°W		Early 19th century	A red brick house with dentilled eaves and a tile roof. There are three storeys and two bays. In the ground floor is a canted porch and a square bay window, and the upper floors contain casement windows, those in the middle floor with cambered heads.	II
26 High Street; 52.85973°N 2.25328°W		Early 19th century	A red brick shop with a fluted frieze over the ground floor and a pediment at the top. There are three storeys and one bay. In the ground floor is a modern shop front, the middle floor contains a sash window flanked by two small windows, and in the top floor is a semicircular tripartite window.	II
36 High Street; 52.85964°N 2.25406°W		Early 19th century	A shop in yellow brick with a tile roof, two storeys and three bays. In the ground floor is a double shop front flanked by a segmental-headed entrance on each side. The upper floor contains sash windows with plain lintels.	II
40 High Street; 52.85961°N 2.25438°W		Early 19th century	A red brick house with moulded eaves and a tile roof. There are three storeys and two bays. In the centre is a porch with a stuccoed surround and a cornice hood, and the windows are sashes with cambered heads.	II
42 High Street; 52.85959°N 2.25453°W		Early 19th century	A roughcast building with a stuccoed plinth and a slate roof. There are two storeys and two bays. In the right bay is a canted bay window tiered over two storeys. In the centre is a doorway with pilasters, an ornamental fanlight and a cornice hood, and the left bay contains sash windows.	II
47 and 49 High Street; 52.85941°N 2.25461°W	—	Early 19th century	A pair of red brick houses with dentilled eaves, tile roofs, and three storeys. No. 47 has three bays, and No. 49 has one. In the ground floor are bay windows; No. 47 has two, one canted, and one square, and No. 49 has one canted bay window. The doorways have moulded surrounds, and No. 47 also has a cornice hood. The upper floors contain sash windows, and between the houses is an entry.	II
54 and 56 High Street; 52.85956°N 2.25555°W		Early 19th century	A red brick building with moulded eaves and a tile roof. There are three storeys and four bays. In the ground floor is a shop front and a doorway to the left with pilasters and a cornice, and a carriage entrance with an elliptical arch and a keyblock. The windows are sashes.	II
63 High Street; 52.85937°N 2.25531°W		Early 19th century	A red brick house with dentilled eaves, it has two storeys and three bays. Steps flanked by wrought iron railings lead up to a central doorway that has a moulded surround and a cornice hood, and the windows are sashes.	II
7 and 9 Stafford Road; 52.85518°N 2.24347°W	—	Early 19th century	A pair of roughcast houses with projecting eaves, a tile roof, and two storeys. No. 9 has three bays, the middle bay projecting and gabled and containing a doorway with a stuccoed surround, pilasters, and a radial fanlight. No. 7 has two bays and a central doorway with a moulded semicircular head. The windows are sashes with plain lintels.	II
12–24 Stone Road; 52.86000°N 2.25007°W	—	Early 19th century	A terrace of seven houses in red brick, some painted, with dentilled eaves and a tile roof. There are two storeys, and each house has one bay. The doorways have small hoods, and the windows are sashes or replacement casements with wedge lintels.	II
Acton Hill; 52.85141°N 2.24233°W	—	Early 19th century	A red brick farmhouse with a slate roof, two storeys and four bays. The doorway has three-quarter Doric columns, a moulded surround, a plain entablature, and a moulded cornice, and the windows are sashes with plain lintels.	II
Brockton Hall; 52.88152°N 2.27017°W	—	Early 19th century	A red brick farmhouse with a sill band, a plain parapet, and a slate roof with coped gables. There are three storeys and three bays. The porch has a stuccoed moulded cornice hood, and the windows are sashes with moulded cornices, those in the upper floors with semicircular heads.	II
Former Stables, Broughton Hall; 52.90270°N 2.34902°W	—	Early 19th century	The stables have been partly converted for residential use. The building is in brick with stone dressings and a tile roof. There are two storeys and three bays, the outer bays pedimented. The windows are casements. and on the roof is a wooden cupola.	II
Outbuildings, Byanna; 52.86580°N 2.25185°W	—	Early 19th century	The outbuildings to the north of the farmhouse are in red brick with tile roofs, and surround three sides of the farmyard. They consist of stable wings on the north and west sides, and a cowshed and a range of sheds on the east side. The buildings contain openings including mullioned windows, doorways and pitching holes. There is a cartshed wing facing the road that has four segmental-headed openings.	II
Castle Lodge; 52.86235°N 2.25339°W	—	Early 19th century	The lodge at the entrance to the grounds of Eccleshall Castle is in stone with a pyramidal tile roof. The roof overhangs and is supported on wooden posts. There is one storey, a square plan, and a small rear wing. The windows are sashes, there is a canted bay window, and the doorway is angled.	II
Crown Inn; 52.85960°N 2.25294°W		Early 19th century	The public house is in brick with dentilled eaves and a tile roof. There are two storeys, and a main block of four bays. In the ground floor is a colonnade of four round-headed arches with moulded keyblocks, and the upper floor contains sash windows. To the left is a recessed lower two-storey wing with a canted bay window in the ground floor and a tripartite sash window above.	II
Turnstile adjoining lychgate, Holy Trinity Church; 52.85935°N 2.25730°W	—	Early 19th century (probable)	The turnstile is to the east of the lychgate at the entrance to the churchyard. It is in wrought iron and enclosed in iron railings.	II
Former Midland Bank; 52.85983°N 2.25248°W		Early 19th century	The building is in red brick with a tile roof, three storeys, three bays, and a two-storey one-bay wing on the right. On the front is a shop front, and the wing contains a segmental-headed entry. The windows are sashes with wedge lintels.	II
Former mill and grain store, Walk Mill; 52.86495°N 2.31088°W		Early 19th century	The mill, now disused, is in brick, with two storeys, and contains a doorway and two windows. Inside, there is a 15 feet (4.6 m) diameter undershot waterwheel. The grain store is in brick on a stone base, and has one storey, and contains a doorway and a window.	II
Former Police Station; 52.85944°N 2.25441°W		Early 19th century	The building is in red brick with moulded eaves and a tile roof. There are three storeys and five bays. In the centre is a porch with Doric columns and a moulded cornice hood. The windows are sashes with wedge lintels and moulded sills.	II
Milestone, 17 Stafford Street; 52.85903°N 2.25133°W		Early 19th century (probable)	The milestone is outside the Kings Arms Inn, and is a plain stone inscribed with the distances in miles to Stafford and to Woore.	II
Pershall Farm Farmhouse; 52.86609°N 2.27300°W		Early 19th century	The farmhand is in red brick with a tile roof, three storeys and three bays. The central doorway has pilasters, a rectangular fanlight, and an entablature, and the windows are casements with segmental heads.	II
Royal Oak Hotel; 52.85959°N 2.25326°W		Early 19th century	The public house is in painted brick with moulded eaves, and a tile roof with coped gables. There are two storeys, a main block of five bays, and a long rear wing. In the ground floor is a colonnade of five segmental arches, and the upper floor contains transomed casement windows. To the right is a recessed bay with a wide carriage way, above are three sash windows in moulded architraves, and at the top is a dentilled pediment.	II
St Catherine's Well, Big Wood; 52.87251°N 2.30607°W	—	Early 19th century} (probable)	Over the spring, which is now dry, is a structure in stone with a square plan and a pyramidal roof.	II
The Cottage, Pershall; 52.86604°N 2.27737°W		Early 19th century	A red brick cottage with dentilled eaves, a tile roof, two storeys, and three bays. There are two doorways, one with a gabled porch, and the other with pilasters and a weather hood, and the windows are casements.	II
The Hough; 52.86344°N 2.27843°W	—	Early 19th century	The house, which has a core dating from about 1600, is in red brick with two dentilled bands, and a tile roof with coped gable ends. There are three storeys, three bays, and a later single-storey rear wing. The doorway has a rectangular fanlight and a flat hood on brackets, and the windows are casements with segmental heads.	II
Walton Farmhouse; 52.84890°N 2.20932°W	—	Early 19th century	A red brick farmhouse with a hipped tile roof, three storeys and three bays. The doorway has a moulded surround with pilasters and a radial fanlight, and the windows are sashes with plain lintels.	II
Cromwell House, Pershall; 52.86613°N 2.27682°W	—	Early to Mid 19th century	The house is in red brick with moulded eaves and a tile roof. On the front is a lattice porch, and the windows are casements with cambered heads.	II
Garmelow Manor; 52.85262°N 2.29792°W	—	Early to Mid 19th century	A red brick house on a stone plinth, with moulded eaves, and a tile roof with a coped gable at the east end. There are three storeys, three bays, and rear extensions. The doorway has stone pilasters and a cornice hood on brackets, and the windows are sashes with plain lintels.	II
Cash Farmhouse; 52.83628°N 2.27779°W	—	c. 1840	The farmhouse is in stuccoed red brick, and has a tile roof with gables and fretted bargeboards. It is in Regency style, and has two storeys and an L-shaped plan. The entrance front has three bays, the left bay gabled, and a central gabled porch with a chamfered arched entrance, a shield in the gable apex, and lancet windows in the sides. The outer bays of the ground floor contain two-light windows with round-headed lights and hood moulds, and in the upper floor is a central narrow window and blind windows in the outer bays. The garden front has two bays, the left bay gabled. In the ground floor are two canted bay windows with shallow parapets, and the upper floor contains two-light windows.	II
Walton Hall; 52.85197°N 2.22236°W	—	c. 1848	A country house in Classical style, later used as a school, it is in stone with a rusticated plinth, a moulded frieze, a modillioned eaves cornice, and a hipped slate roof. There are two storeys, and a front of five bays, with a central canted bay window. The other windows have moulded architraves, and some have cornices on consoles and pediments. At the rear is a large porte-cochère and a doorway with an architrave, and there are later wings on the left.	II
74 High Street; 52.85947°N 2.25640°W	—	Mid 19th century	The house is in engraved stucco, with overhanging eaves, and a roof of ornamental tiles. There are two storeys and three bays, the middle bay projecting under a gable with ornamental bargeboards and a finial. In the centre is a doorway with a moulded surround, and fluted pilasters, flanked by bow windows, all under a tiled lean-to roof. In the upper floor are renewed windows, and the middle bay is blind.	II
20 and 22 Stafford Street; 52.85884°N 2.25158°W	—	Mid 19th century	A pair of mirror-image houses, later used for other purposes, they are in red brick on a stone plinth, with corbelled dentilled eaves, and an ornamental tiled roof. There are two storeys and four bays. In the outer bays, steps lead up to doorways with pilasters and cornice hoods, and the inner bays contain canted bay windows. In the upper floor are sash windows with wedge lintels.	II
Southwell House, Horse Fair; 52.85841°N 2.25134°W	—	Mid 19th century	The house is in engraved stucco with a sill band, moulded eaves on brackets, and a tile roof. There are two storeys and three bays. The middle bay is flanked by pilasters, and has a gable with ornamental bargeboards. In the ground floor is a porch with fluted pilasters, and a doorway with a cornice hood, above which is a sash window in a moulded architrave. The outer bays contain canted bay windows tiered over two storeys.	II
St Paul's Church, Croxton; 52.88933°N 2.32156°W		1853–54	The church was designed by Ewan Christian in Decorated style. It is built in stone with a tile roof, and consists of a nave, north and south aisles, a south porch, and a chancel with a polygonal apse. On the west gable end is a bellcote.	II
Memorial Hall, Church Street; 52.85993°N 2.26086°W	—	1862	Originally a school designed by G. E. Street in Gothic style, it has since been used for other purposes. It is in red brick with stone dressings and a tile roof. The ends are gabled, and on the front is a projecting gable, a lean-to porch on its left, and a dormer above the porch.	II
27 High Street; 52.85953°N 2.25354°W	—	Late 19th century	The building is in wood on a stone plinth, with a single storey and a single bay. It has a shop front flanked by pilasters and a pediment above.	II
Former fire station 52.85946°N 2.25404°W		Late 19th century	The former fire station is in brick with a tile roof, and has an overhanging tile-hung gable on the front. There are two storeys and one bay. In the ground floor is a shop front, the upper floor contains a four-light oriel window, and on the roof is an open lantern with a leaded ogee cupola and a finial.	II
Johnson Hall; 52.85148°N 2.25890°W		1883	A small country house in Tudor style. It is in two and three storeys with attics, the ground floor is in brick with stone dressings, the upper parts are timber framed, with coved, overhanging eaves, and gabled and hipped slate roofs. The south front has five gabled bays, the middle three bays taller and projecting. The central doorway has Roman Doric pilasters, paired corbels supporting a balcony, and a semicircular-headed doorway with a moulded arch, a keystone and decorated spandrels. The balcony has a balustrade, and above is a timber screen with paired openings and an oriel window. Elsewhere on the front are canted bay windows, mullioned windows and casements.	II
Former British Legion Club, 6 High Street; 52.85987°N 2.25186°W		c. 1884	Originally a market hall, later used for other purposes, it has a front of applied timber framing. There are two storeys and one bay. The upper storey projects over the pavement, and is carried on wood supports. In the upper floor is a four-light oriel window, and above is a gable with carved bargeboards surmounted by a carved wood eagle finial and an iron wind vane.	II
Drinking fountain, Slindon; 52.89005°N 2.26082°W		1884	The gabled drinking fountain is in stone and in Gothic style. It consists of a trough in a recess with a pointed head, a hood mould, and a dated inscription.	II
Lychgate, Holy Trinity Church; 52.85933°N 2.25734°W		1892	The lychgate at the entrance to he churchyard was designed by Basil Champneys. It has stone flanking walls with moulded wooden posts carrying a gabled wood canopy with elaborately carved bargeboards.	II
St Chad's Church, Slindon; 52.88712°N 2.25766°W		1894	The church was designed by Basil Champneys in late Gothic style. It is in stone with a tile roof, and has a cruciform plan, consisting of a nave, a south porch, north and south transepts, a chancel, and a short tower at the crossing. The tower has an embattled parapet with eight pinnacles.	II*
Memorial Cross; 52.85925°N 2.25748°W		1921	The war memorial is in the churchyard of Holy Trinity Church. It is in sandstone, and consists of a Celtic wheel-head cross on a tapering chamfered shaft. This stands on a pedestal, on a plinth, on one step. On the pedestal and plinth are inscriptions and the names of those lost in the two World Wars.	II
Telephone kiosk 52.85914°N 2.25771°W		1935	A K6 telephone kiosk, designed by Giles Gilbert Scott. It is in cast iron and has a square plan and a saucer-domed roof. There are low relief crowns in the top panels, and margin-light glazing to the windows and the door.	II
