= HM Prison Drake Hall =

Women's prison in Staffordshire, England

Coordinates: 52.8789°N 2.2415°W

HMP Drake Hall
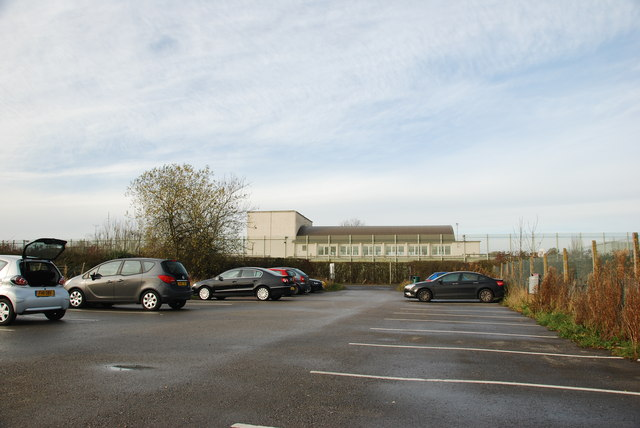
- Drake Hall Prison from visitor car park
- Interactive map of HMP Drake Hall
- Location: Eccleshall, Staffordshire
- Security class: Adult Female/Closed
- Population: 341 (December 2015)
- Opened: 1960s
- Managed by: HM Prison Services
- Governor: Lisa Garnett
- Website: Drake Hall at justice.gov.uk

HMP Prison Drake Hall is a women's closed prison, located near the town of Eccleshall in Staffordshire, England. The prison is operated by His Majesty's Prison Service.

== History ==
Formerly used during World War II by female munitions workers as a residence, then as a Teacher Training College. From January 1957 until August 1957, Drake Hall was used as temporary housing for hundreds of refugees from Egypt, who were expelled by Nasser following the shambles of the Suez Crisis of October 1956. The first inflow of refugees was on 7 January 1957. Most of the first occupiers were from Alexandria. The building was repurposed in the 1960s as a male open prison. From 1974, Drake Hall has been used as a women's prison. In the mid-1990s, the prison was renovated. In 2002, it became a semi-open prison after a perimeter fence was constructed, but was re-designated a closed prison in March 2009.

An open unit for prisoners nearing the end of their sentences was added in 2015. Inmates can work there in various roles including personal trainers, beauty therapists and call-centre assistants. Low risk prisoners are allowed to work in nearby towns.

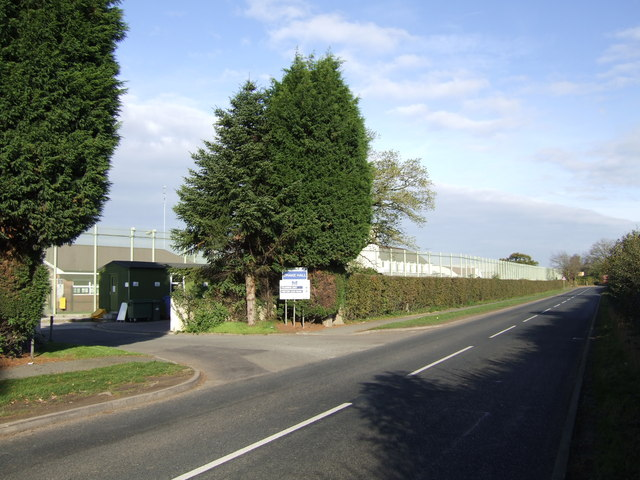
Prison entrance in 2006

== The prison today ==
Drake Hall holds both adult and young offenders. It specialises in foreign national prisoners and in resettlement.

The prison's regime includes incentives, education, workshops, training courses, farms and gardens, a works department, and a gym. There are also voluntary and paid outwork programmes and a listener scheme.

== Notable inmates ==
- Barbara Salisbury (formerly) – nurse convicted of the attempted murder of two elderly patients in order to "free up beds", was also charged but not convicted of other attempted murders/ murders of patients
- Jordan Worth (released in January 2022)
