= Samuel Butler (schoolmaster) =

English classicist and bishop (1774–1839)

The Right Reverend Samuel Butler FRS
- Bishop of Lichfield
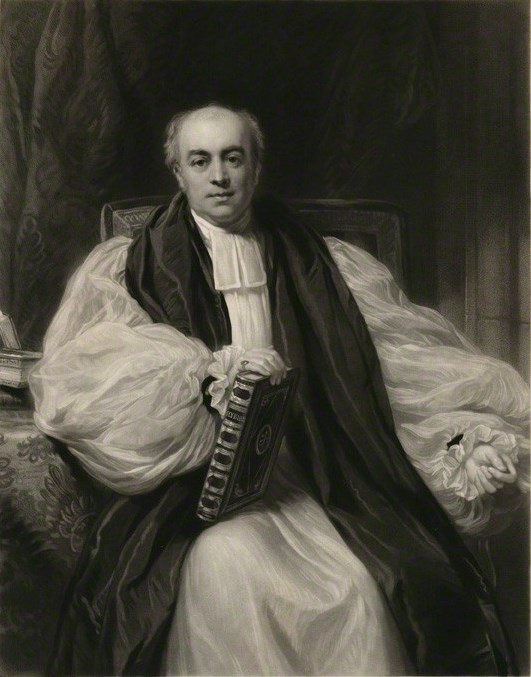
- Diocese: Diocese of Lichfield
- In office: 1836–1839
- Predecessor: Henry Ryder
- Successor: James Bowstead

Personal details
- Born: 30 January 1774
- Died: 4 December 1839 (aged 65)
- Denomination: Anglican
- Education: Rugby School; St John's College, Cambridge

Samuel Butler FRS (30 January 1774 – 4 December 1839) was an English classical scholar and schoolmaster of Shrewsbury School, and Bishop of Lichfield. His biography was written by his grandson Samuel Butler, the author of the novels Erewhon and The Way of All Flesh.

== Life ==
Butler was born at Kenilworth, Warwickshire. He was educated at Rugby School, and in 1791 was admitted to St John's College, Cambridge. He obtained three of Sir William Browne's medals, for the Latin (1792) and Greek (1793, 1794) odes, the medal for the Greek ode in 1792 being won by Samuel Taylor Coleridge. In 1793 Butler was elected to the Craven scholarship, amongst the competitors being John Keate, afterwards headmaster of Eton, and Coleridge. In 1796 he was fourth senior optime and senior chancellor's classical medallist. In 1797 and 1798 he obtained the members prize for Latin essay. He acquired the degrees of BA in 1796, MA in 1799, and DD in 1811. In 1797 he was elected a fellow of St John's and ordained deacon in the Church of England, and in 1798 became headmaster of Shrewsbury School, the same year as his ordination as priest, at the age of 24.

As a clergyman, he was perpetual curate of Berwick Chapelry near Shrewsbury from 1801 to 1815 and in 1802 he was appointed as vicar of Kenilworth, in 1807 to a prebendal stall in Lichfield Cathedral, and in 1822 to the archdeaconry of Derby; all these appointments he had at the same time as his headmastership, but in 1836 he was promoted to the bishopric of Lichfield (and Coventry, which was separated from his diocese during the same year).

It is in association with Shrewsbury school that Butler is chiefly remembered. During his headmastership its reputation increased greatly, and in the standard of its scholarship was the equal of any other public school in England. He was considered to be "in all essential respects, the originator" of the Praepostor system of placing older boys in authority over younger at the school. He worked despite having for 37 years "a state of permanently impossible relations" with his second master (deputy), John Jeudwine, which, according to school historian J. B. Oldham, "embittered both their lives to the detriment of the school, the scandal of the town and the embarrassment of Butler's every action".

However, there were shortcomings in the welfare of pupils. Fights between boys were said to average seventy a week and were regarded by Dr Butler "with a blind eye", comfort for boarders was minimal, and complaints about food were continuous, on one occasion leading to a riot. His initials "S.B." over the gateway to the house he built himself next to the school were said to be a sign for "stale bread, sour beer, salt butter, and stinking beef sold by Samuel Butler". He tried to suppress games at Shrewsbury, considering football (pre-FA) as "only fit for butcher boys" and "more fit for farmboys and labourers than for young gentlemen".

Charles Darwin, who recalled loathing the rote learning, was among his notable pupils, as was Butler's immediate successor as headmaster, Benjamin Hall Kennedy.

His edition of Aeschylus, with the text and notes of Stanley, was published during 1809–1816, and was somewhat severely criticised by the Edinburgh Review, but Butler was prevented by his appointment to the episcopate from revising it. He also wrote a Sketch of Modern and Ancient Geography (1813, reprinted frequently) for use by schools, and published atlases of ancient and modern geography. His large library included a fine collection of Aldine editions and Greek and Latin manuscripts.

When he became bishop his health was overshadowed by asthma and he died at Eccleshall Castle, Staffordshire (the episcopal country residence), in December 1839 aged 65. Bishop Butler is buried at the Collegiate Church of St Mary the Virgin Shrewsbury, the former parish church of Shrewsbury School. After his death the Aldines were sold by auction, the manuscripts purchased by the British Museum. In his will he left a mansion with land at Whitehall in Shrewsbury, which he had bought in 1834 as an intended retirement home, to his grandson Samuel. When the latter had the land redeveloped for housing after the death of his own father, he named one of the roads laid out, Bishop Street, in honour of the grandfather.

Butler's life has been written by his grandson Samuel Butler, author of Erewhon (The Life and Letters of Dr. Samuel Butler, 1896); see also Baker's History of St John's College, Cambridge (ed. JEB Mayor, 1869); Sandys, Hist. Class. Schol. (ed. 1908), vol. iii. p. 398.

Butler collected some Greek manuscripts (e.g. Minuscule 202).

Church of England titles
Preceded by The Honourable; Henry Ryder	Bishop of Lichfield; 1836–1839	Succeeded by James Bowstead
