= Anthony Hobson (English cricketer) =

English cricketer (born 1965)

Personal information
- Full name: Anthony David Hobson
- Born: 10 September 1965 (age 61); Eccleshall, Staffordshire, England
- Batting: Right-handed
- Bowling: Right-arm off break

Domestic team information
- Years: Team
- 1989–1994: Staffordshire

Career statistics
Competition	List A
Matches	1
Runs scored	0
Batting average	0.00
100s/50s	–/–
Top score	0.00
Balls bowled	–
Wickets	–
Bowling average	–
5 wickets in innings	–
10 wickets in match	–
Best bowling	–
Catches/stumpings	–/–
- Source: Cricinfo, 15 June 2011

Anthony David Hobson (born 10 September 1965) is a former English cricketer. Hobson was a right-handed batsman who bowled right-arm off break. He was born in Eccleshall, Staffordshire.

Hobson made his debut for Staffordshire in the 1989 Minor Counties Championship against Durham. Hobson played Minor counties cricket for Staffordshire from 1989 to 1994, which included 22 Minor Counties Championship matches and 5 MCCA Knockout Trophy matches. He made his only List A appearance for Staffordshire against Warwickshire in the 1992 NatWest Trophy. He was dismissed for a duck in this match by Allan Donald.
