= Robert Wright (English bishop) =

English bishop

The Right Reverend Robert Wright
- Bishop of Lichfield
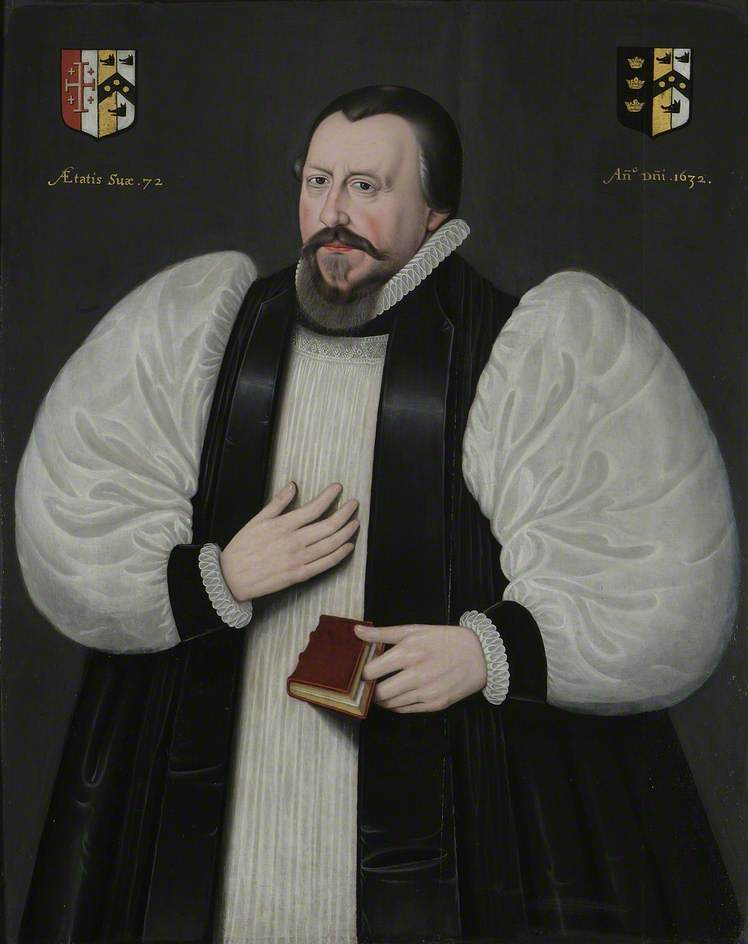
- Diocese: Diocese of Lichfield
- In office: 1632–1643
- Predecessor: Thomas Morton
- Successor: Accepted Frewen
- Other post: Bishop of Bristol (1623–1632)

Personal details
- Born: 1560 St Albans, Hertfordshire
- Died: September 1643 (aged 82–83) Eccleshall Castle, Staffordshire
- Denomination: Anglican
- Education: Trinity College, Oxford

Robert Wright (1560–1643) was an English bishop, first holding the see of Bristol and then the see of Lichfield and Coventry. He died at an episcopal palace, under siege in the First English Civil War.

== Life ==
Wright was born of humble parentage in St Albans, Hertfordshire, in 1560, and probably attended the refounded free school there (now St Albans School), where preference was given to poor scholars of the borough. He matriculated at Trinity College, Oxford in 1574 at the age of 14, was elected to a scholarship in 1575, and graduated as a B.A. in 1580, becoming a fellow the next year. He proceeded to obtain an M.A. in 1584, a B.D. in 1592 and a D.D. in 1597.

In 1601, Wright was made Canon Residentiary and Treasurer of Wells, a post he held until 1632. He was appointed chaplain to both Queen Elizabeth I and King James I. In 1613 he was appointed the first warden of the newly established Wadham College, resigning three months later as the college required the warden to remain celibate, but Wright had obtained Royal dispensation to marry. A daughter, Hester was born soon after and went on to marry Sir Humphrey Style of Langley (Beckenham) and after his death in 1659 John Scott of Hayes Place (Kent). A son, Calvert, was born in 1620 and baptised at Sonning Church in Berkshire where Robert had been vicar since 1604. In 1623, he was appointed as Bishop of Bristol, and was later translated to the See of Lichfield and Coventry in 1632.

He died at the seat of the Bishops of Lichfield, Eccleshall Castle in Staffordshire, in September 1643 but, as the castle was under siege by Parliamentarians at the time, could not be properly buried.

Academic offices
Preceded by First Warden	Warden of Wadham College, Oxford; April 1613 - July 1613	Succeeded by John Fleming
Church of England titles
Preceded by Rowland Searchfield	Bishop of Bristol; 1623–1632	Succeeded by George Coke
Preceded by Thomas Morton	Bishop of Lichfield; 1632–1643	Succeeded by Accepted Frewen
