= James Bowstead =

British Anglican clergyman

The Right Reverend James Bowstead
- Bishop of Lichfield
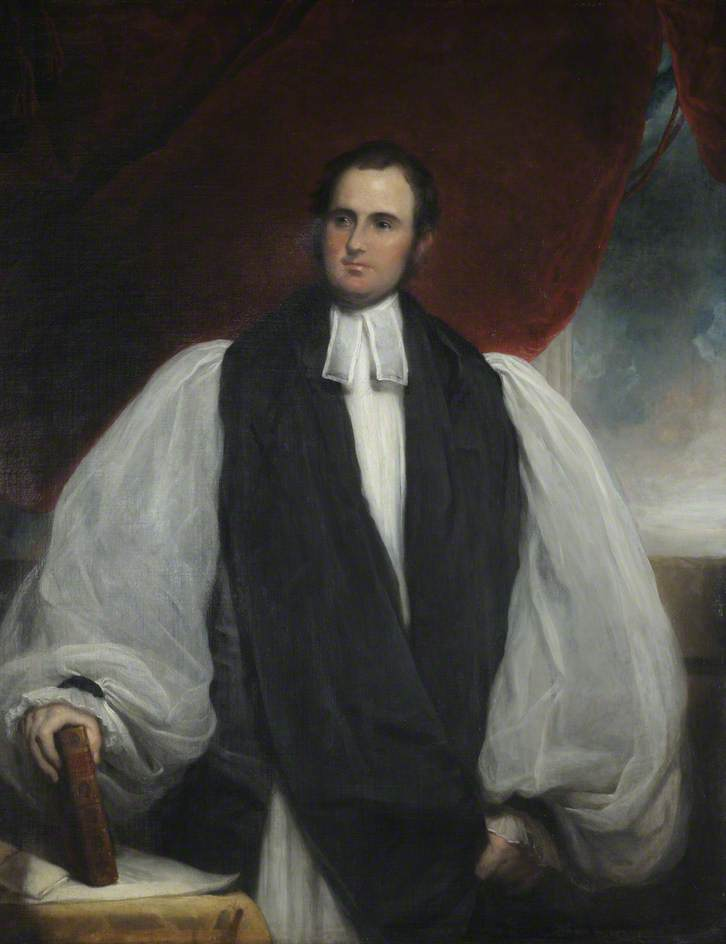
- Portrait by Martin Archer Shee
- Diocese: Diocese of Lichfield
- In office: 1840–1843
- Predecessor: Samuel Butler
- Successor: John Lonsdale

Personal details
- Born: 1 May 1801
- Died: 11 October 1843 (aged 42)
- Denomination: Anglican
- Education: Corpus Christi College, Cambridge

James Bowstead (1 May 1801 – 11 October 1843) was an Anglican clergyman who served in the Church of England as the Bishop of Sodor and Man (1838–1840) and Bishop of Lichfield (1840–1843).

Born in Great Salkeld, he was educated at Bampton grammar school and Corpus Christi College, Cambridge, where he graduated with a Bachelor of Arts in 1824 and a Doctorate of Divinity in 1834. He was a Fellow of Corpus Christi College, Cambridge (1824–1838) and also a tutor at the college (1832–1838). During that period, he was ordained a priest in the Anglican ministry in 1827 and became Rector of Rettendon, Essex in 1837.

He was nominated Bishop of Sodor and Man by Queen Victoria on 13 July 1838 and was consecrated by Archbishop William Howley of Canterbury on 22 July 1838. Eighteen months later, he was translated to the bishopric of Lichfield on 23 January 1840.

He died in office at Clifton, Bristol in 1843, aged 42.

== Bibliography ==
- Fryde, E. B.; Greenway, D. E.; Porter, S.; Roy, I., eds. (1986). Handbook of British Chronology (3rd, reprinted 2003 ed.). Cambridge: Cambridge University Press. ISBN 0-521-56350-X.
- Horn, J. M. (2003). Coventry and Lichfield Diocese. Fasti Ecclesiae Anglicanae 1541–1857, Volume 10. British History Online.
- Horn, J. M.; Smith, D. M.; Mussett, P. (2004). Carlisle, Chester, Durham, Manchester, Ripon, and Sodor and Man Dioceses. Fasti Ecclesiae Anglicanae 1541–1857, Volume 11. British History Online.

Church of England titles
Preceded by William Ward	Bishop of Sodor and Man; 1838–1840	Succeeded by Henry Pepys
Preceded by Samuel Butler	Bishop of Lichfield; 1840–1843	Succeeded by John Lonsdale
