= John Lonsdale =

Third Principal of King's College, London

The Right Reverend John Lonsdale
- Bishop of Lichfield
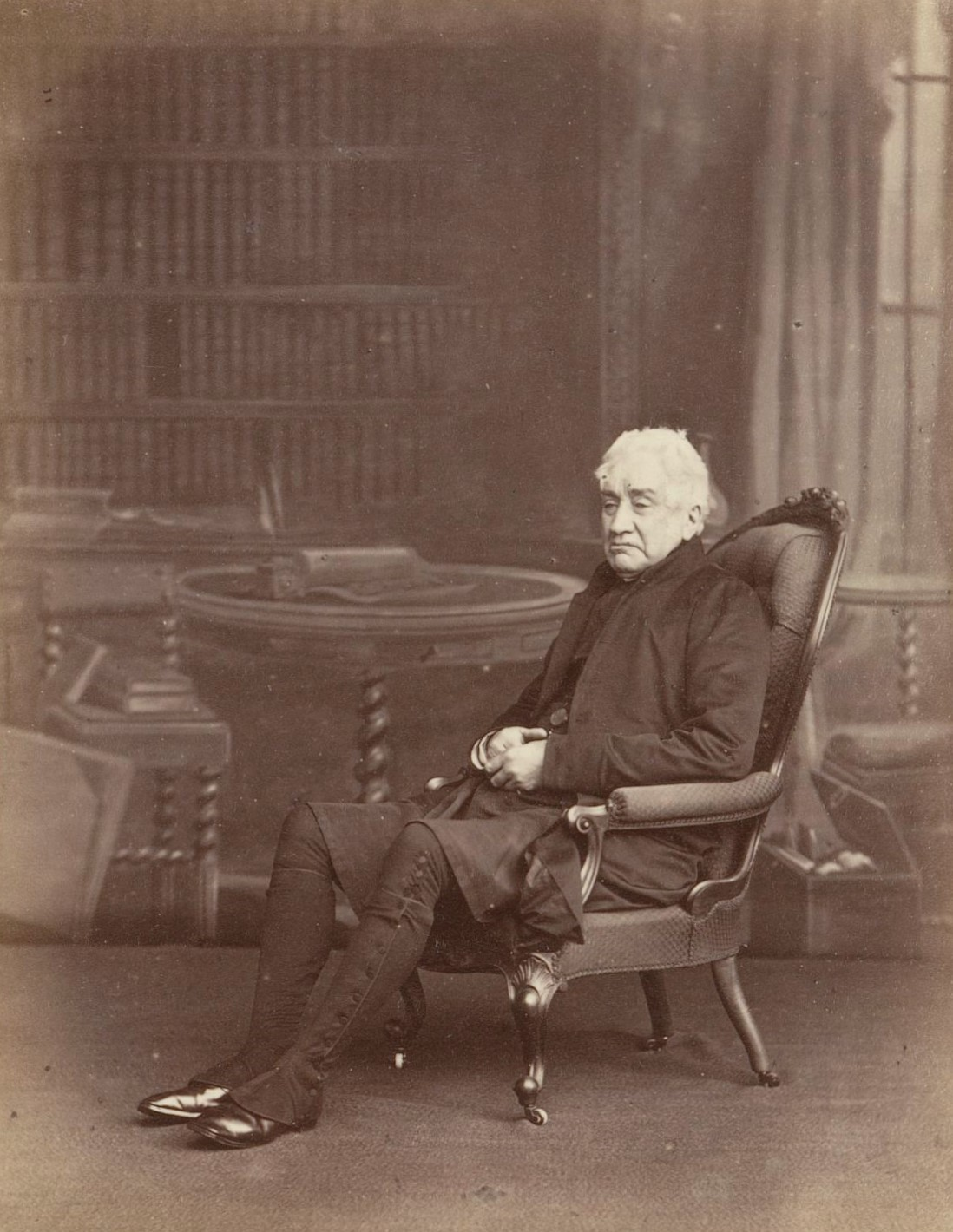
- Church: Church of England
- See: Lichfield
- In office: 3 December 1843–19 October 1867
- Predecessor: James Bowstead
- Successor: George Selwyn

Personal details
- Born: 17 January 1788 Newmillerdam
- Died: 19 October 1867 (aged 79)
- Education: Eton College; King's College, Cambridge

John Lonsdale (17 January 1788 – 19 October 1867) was an English clergyman, who was the third Principal of King's College, London, and later served as Bishop of Lichfield.

He was educated at Eton College and King's College, Cambridge, and went on to become Principal of King's College, London in 1838 following the death of Hugh James Rose.

== Life ==
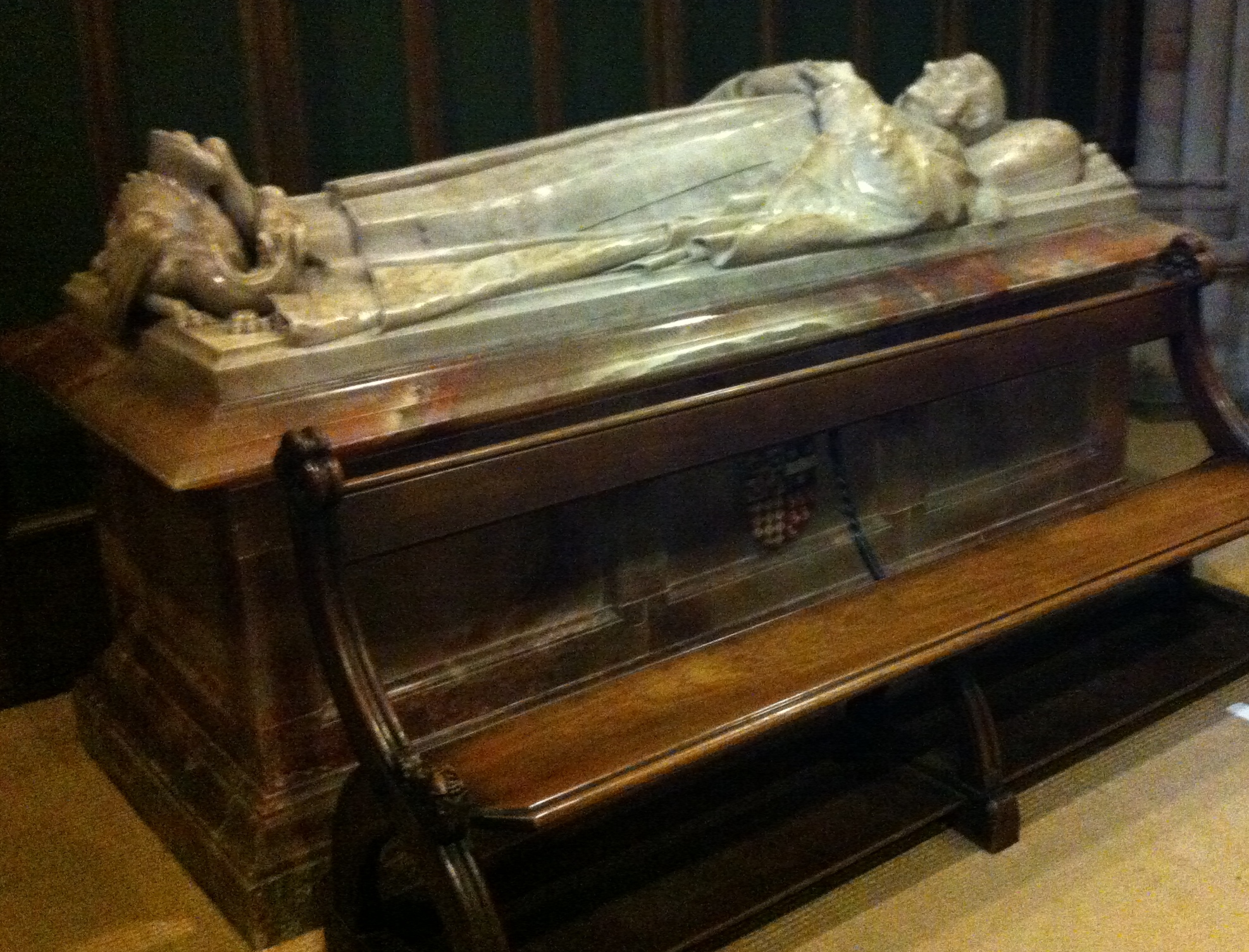
Memorial to John Lonsdale in Lichfield Cathedral

Born on 17 January 1788 at Newmillerdam, near Wakefield, he was the eldest son of John Lonsdale (1737–1800), vicar of Darfield and perpetual curate of Chapelthorpe. His mother's name was Elizabeth Steer. He was educated at Eton under Joseph Goodall, who thought him the best Latin scholar he had ever had. He went in 1806 to Cambridge, and became Fellow of King's in 1809.

Lonsdale was admitted to Lincoln's Inn in 1811, but was ordained in the Church of England in October 1815. In the next month he married, and was shortly afterwards appointed chaplain to Archbishop Charles Manners-Sutton and assistant preacher at the Temple Church. In 1822, the archbishop gave him the rectory of Mersham in Kent, which he left in 1827 for a prebendal stall at Lincoln Cathedral.

With further preferment, Lonsdale passed in 1828 to the precentorship of the diocese of Lichfield, later exchanged for a prebend at St Paul's Cathedral. In the same year he became rector of St George's, Bloomsbury, where he remained until 1834. In 1836 he was chosen preacher of Lincoln's Inn, and obtained the rectory of Southfleet, near Gravesend.

In 1839, Lonsdale was elected Principal of King's College, London: the post on its creation had been offered to him. The college prospered under his administration, and the hospital was chiefly founded by him. In 1840 he was elected Provost of Eton, but declined the appointment in favour of Francis Hodgson, who had been nominated by the Crown, but refused by the Fellows on the ground of insufficient academic qualification. In 1842 he was made archdeacon of Middlesex, and in October 1843 was raised to the see of Lichfield, and consecrated on 3 December. He was unwilling to accept the offer, but on consulting the Archbishop of Canterbury and the Bishop of London found it had been made on the recommendation of them both. His episcopate was mostly uneventful except as regards church extension, on a large scale. There was controversy attending the establishment of Lichfield Theological College, which was settled by him. His sympathies were High Church; but he protested against the removal of F. D. Maurice from his professorship, and condemned the existing law on marriage with a deceased wife's sister, though he did not vote for its repeal.

Lonsdale died suddenly at his home in Eccleshall Castle on 19 October 1867 of the rupture of a blood-vessel in the brain. Various memorials included a monument in Lichfield Cathedral.

== Works ==
Lonsdale prepared for the press The Four Gospels, with Annotations (1849), with William Hale. His last sermon, preached the day before his death, with a few others, and a selection from his Latin verses, were appended to the biography of him by his son-in-law, Lord Grimthorpe.

== Family ==
Lonsdale married in 1815 Sophia, daughter of John Bolland, who died in 1852, and had issue:

1. James Gylby Lonsdale the academic;
2. John Gylby, canon of Lichfield, whose daughter Sophia Lonsdale was a noted anti-suffragist
3. Fanny Catherine, married Edmund Beckett, 1st Baron Grimthorpe;
4. Sophia, married the Rev. William Bryans;
5. Lucy Maria.

Academic offices
Preceded by Hugh James Rose	Principal of King's College, London; 1838–1843	Succeeded by Richard William Jelf
Church of England titles
Preceded by James Bowstead	Bishop of Lichfield; 1843–1867	Succeeded by George Augustus Selwyn
