= Eccleshall Castle =

Grade II* listed castle in Staffordshire, England

Coordinates: 52°51′46″N 2°15′30″W

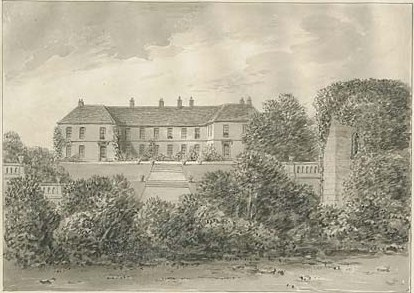
Eccleshall Castle in 1837

Eccleshall Castle is located in Eccleshall, Staffordshire, England (grid reference SJ827295). It was originally built in the 13th century. It is a Scheduled Ancient Monument and a Grade II* listed building.

== Origins ==
The land was reputedly granted to St Chad, the medieval bishop of Lichfield. In 1200 Bishop Geoffrey de Muschamp was granted by King John a ‘licence to crenellate’ a castle. As Eccleshall was conveniently situated on the main road between the centres of the Lichfield diocese in Chester, Lichfield and Coventry, it was an ideal location as a diocesan base. This original castle was replaced by a larger castle in 1305 by Bishop Walter Langton, Chancellor of England.

== War of the Roses ==
At the outbreak of the Wars of the Roses, Margaret of Anjou, Queen consort of Henry VI, took refuge within the castle after the Battle of Blore Heath in 1459.

In June 1643 the castle was besieged by Sir William Brereton and his Parliamentary forces encamped around the church. Their guns caused considerable damage to the walls but the castle held out, with Bishop Robert Wright sheltering within. When the Parliamentary forces finally took the castle on August 30 they found that the bishop had died of a heart attack during the siege and most of the defenders were either drunk or had gone into town drinking in the taverns. The castle was slighted to prevent future use as a stronghold but enough of the building, including an unusual nine-sided tower, together with the moat walls and medieval bridge, remained to be used as a prison for Royalist gentry. The castle and its grounds were confiscated and sold, but bought back again by the diocese.

== Later history ==
The present house, still known as Eccleshall Castle, was built amongst the ruins in 1693 by William Lloyd, Bishop of Lichfield and Coventry, incorporating fragments of the slighted 14th-century structure, and was also occupied by successive bishops of Lichfield. Sir Walter Scott often stayed at the castle as guest of then bishop, James Cornwallis. In the 18th century the gatehouse was demolished and the moat drained. The last bishop to live there was John Lonsdale, who died in the house in 1867.

== Today ==
The Castle is now in private hands and closed to the public, although the gardens are occasionally opened to raise money for local Eccleshall charities as well as for occasional weddings. It has been the home of the Carter-Motley family for more than a hundred years.

== See also ==
- Grade II* listed buildings in Stafford (borough)
- Listed buildings in Eccleshall
